= Presidency of Pedro Castillo =

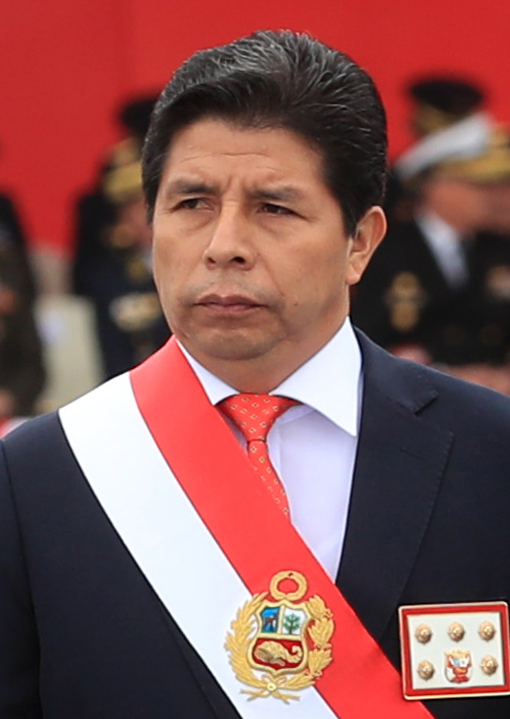
- Castillo in 2022
- Presidency of Pedro Castillo; 28 July 2021 – 7 December 2022
- Prime Minister: Guido Bellido; Mirtha Vásquez; Héctor Valer; Aníbal Torres; Betssy Chávez
- Cabinet: See list
- Party: Free Peru (2021–2022); Independent (2022–present)
- Election: 2021
- Seat: Government Palace

The presidency of Pedro Castillo began with Castillo's inauguration as the president of Peru on 28 July 2021, the Peruvian Independence Day. In the 2021 Peruvian general election, Castillo, a school teacher and union organizer, won the presidential election against the right-wing candidate Keiko Fujimori of Popular Force by a 45,000 margin in the runoff. In the congressional elections, Castillo's party, Free Peru, did not get a majority in the Congress of the Republic of Peru.

== Transition period and inauguration ==
=== Government Palace ===
In his inauguration speech Castillo said he would not govern from the Government Palace, also known as the House of Pizarro, due to it being a colonial symbol. Additionally, Castillo said that he would turn the Government Palace into a museum. Castillo first governed from a temporary house in Breña, Peru, but he began to govern from the Government Palace due to legal issues involving the house. Governing from the Government Palace was announced as a temporary measure by Castillo. However, no further announcements on the Government Palace have been made.

== Domestic affairs ==
=== Economy ===
==== Monetary policy ====
Since Castillo's victory in the first electoral round, the Sol has faced a precipitous fall in value against the dollar, due to fears of inflation and expropriations. As of 23 September 2021, the Sol had lost 12% of its value since the start of the year, making Peru's currency one of the worst performers among emerging markets. Castillo has sought to calm the markets by keeping Julio Velarde as the head of the Central Bank. During a speech before the OAS assembly, Castillo stated that his government is not communist and that he wouldn't expropriate anyone. Castillo stated that he didn't come to scare away investment, and invited big businesses to come to the country.

Following Bellido's threat to nationalize the Camisea gas fields, the sol plunged once again. Afterward, Castillo replaced the Bellido cabinet with the Vásquez cabinet, which many have seen as a shift towards a more centrist administration. Following the new cabinet, the Sol began to recover its value, reaching a 10-week high as of 13 October 2021. However, after Castillo asked Congress to nationalize the Camisea gas fields, the Sol began to fall in value once again.

On 9 November 2021, the Bank of America warned that almost all of Peru's inflation indicators are on red alert. They claimed that Peru's expectations "are set to exceed the upper limit of 3% of the Central Bank's target range of a two-year term." The Bank of America suggested that the Central Bank will have to tighten monetary policy.

On 16 November 2021, Velarde announced that Peru would work jointly with India, Singapore, and Hong Kong in developing a central bank digital currency.

==== Price regulations ====
In a bid to lower soaring gas prices, Castillo reintroduced liquefied petroleum gas (LPG) to the Fuel Price Stabilization Fund (FEPC). The FEPC was created in 2002 and serves as a price support by giving a range of minimum and maximum consumer prices. In theory, the FEPC is self-sustaining. Should the price of gas be above the maximum consumer price, the FEPC will subsidize the cost for consumers. If the price of gas is below the minimum consumer price, then the profits will be given to the FEPC. However, LPG was removed from the FEPC in 2020, due to financial costs and scepticism on whether consumer prices were affected by the fiscal intervention. The reintroduction of LPG to the FEPC by Castillo reversed the 2020 policy decision.

Additionally, while Pedro Castillo's Economic Minister Pedro Francke and then Prime Minister Guido Bellido have denied any plans to institute price controls, the Free Peru caucus later attempted to modify the constitution to implement them. The amendment would have allowed the state to regulate the "supply and prices of goods and services produced by public and private companies" due to shortages or a state of emergency. However, the amendment failed to pass within the opposition-controlled Congress.

==== Natural resources ====
Initially, some mining executives feared that Castillo may nationalize mining, as he alluded during his electoral campaign. However, as of late, the Castillo Administration has toned down its rhetoric and showed greater willingness to work with private companies. Castillo has pledged to raise taxes on mining companies, and to make sure that projects are "socially profitable" for local mining communities. Prime Minister Guido Bellido has stated that he welcomes investment, as long as it means the development of the population.

Later, the then prime minister stated that the energy sector should be under government control, while using the Camisea Gas Project as an example. In response, Economic Minister Pedro Francke ruled out expropriating the Camisea gas field. Francke also claimed that Bellido's call for government control of the energy sector was actually referring to state participation in the construction of a proposed natural gas pipeline, the Gran Gasoducto del Sur. However, PM Bellido later urged for the contract with the Camisea gas field to be renegotiated, threatening to nationalize the gas field if higher taxes aren't paid. The Prime Minister has also stated that strategic resources cannot remain in private hands. The Minister of Justice, Aníbal Torres, has stated that he's in favor of renegotiating the contract with Camisea, "like almost all the other ministers." However, Torres rejected the possibility of unilateral nationalization, and said that there were no talks about nationalization within the cabinet.

Bellido's position on the Camisea gas field was supported by the Free Peru caucus. They denied that this was part of an expropriation campaign, saying that the benefits from resource extraction must be prioritized for Peruvians. The President of Congress, Maricarmen Alva, claimed that Bellido's threats of nationalization generated confusion and would scare away investment. Meanwhile, Vice President Dina Boluarte claimed that Bellido's stance on the Camisea oil field was in line with the President Castillo's views. However, Castillo later stated that any renegotiation of the Camisea gas field contract would be in accordance of the rule of law, and stated that "the State and the private sector work together for a better Peru."

Afterward, the Bellido cabinet was removed by the President. Some speculated that Bellido's stance on the Camisea gas field nationalization led to his downfall. However, following the appointment of the Vásquez cabinet, President Castillo urged Congress to make a joint law on the statization or nationalization of the Camisea gas, saying that "It is necessary to give Peruvians what the people have produced." A motion was created in Congress, to ask Prime Minister Mirtha Vásquez to clarify on the President's statements on the Camisea gas fields.

On 20 November 2021, the Prime Minister stated that 4 mines in the Ayacucho region would not be allowed any extensions in their operational timelines, and that the mines will be closed as soon as possible on environmental grounds. Under Peruvian law, all mines have an expected closure date, although the date can be modified by regulators. Oscar Caipo, the president of Confiep, a group of Peru's largest corporations, claimed that Vásquez's decision ignores the rule of law. Raul Jacob, the president of Peru's Society of Mining, Energy and Oil, claimed that Vásquez was legitimizing violence as a justified measure of social pressure, referring to the ongoing mining protests. Vásquez replied by saying that the government respected legal stability and legal regulations.

The British-based Hochschild Mining, which owned two mines subject to closure, had it shares fall by 27% following Vásquez's announcements. Hochschild stated that it would challenge the closure of its mines and claimed that its mines operated under the ""highest environmental standards." The two mines subject to closure account for 80% of Hochschild's gold and silver production. In a press release, Vásquez called for calm and dialogue with the mining industry. However, Hochschild claimed that it had not received any formal communication from the government. JPMorgan analyst Patrick Jones claimed that the recent decisions "further increases the geopolitical risk for miners operating in Peru."

On 23 November 2021, government officials and mining executives claimed to having "productive" talks following the Hochschild stock collapse. The anticipated closure of Hochschild's flagship Pallancata mine would deprive the company of over 60% of its cashflow. Later, the Vice Minister of Mining said that "If [the mining companies] have all the mechanisms to present an extension, they can do so, the door is not closed." This contradicted Vasquez's initial announcement that there would be no extensions, "whether for exploitation, exploration or even shutdown."

On 24 November 2021, PM Vásquez stated that there will be no "violation of legal certainty or unilateral closures," but that "the State assumes the function of supervising the processes of mine closure and environmental control in accordance with the legal frameworks." Additionally, the Council of Ministers released a statement assuring that the government sought active and positive relations with both mining companies and local populations. The statement also rejected violence in all forms but recognized the right to protest as a legitimate right.

On 3 December 2021, the Las Bambas copper mine announced that it would shut down copper production starting mid-December due to continuous road blockades by protestors. The Ministry of Energy and Mines (Minem) said that the shutdown would have significant impact on GDP, and urged for the actors to maintain dialogue and reach a "satisfactory" agreement. Meanwhile, the National Society of Mining, Petroleum and Energy (SNMPE) criticized Minem, saying that "instead of dealing with a solution to the problem, it shows a concern that frankly generates a lot of confusion."

==== Banking ====
Peru's financial sector is characterized by a lack of credit, as 70% of Peruvians are unbanked or underbanked. Following complaints of loan sharks that charge rates up to 200%, Castillo has sought to improve competition by allowing public banks to compete with private banks. Additionally, Castillo has allowed additional foreign banks to enter the Peruvian market.

==== Agriculture ====
On 3 October 2021, the 53rd anniversary of Juan Velasco's rise to power via a military coup d'état, Castillo announced the start of the Second Agrarian Reform with the aim of helping small farmers and ending abuse and inequality. This was a tacit acknowledgement of the original Agrarian Reform carried out by Velasco. Castillo stated that the Second Agrarian Reform will respect property rights and will not involve the expropriation of land. However, Castillo also stated "Let's end with the bosses and the landowners. They will no longer eat thanks to the sweat of the poor and of the peasants."

Castillo signaled that he would adjust the price bands to protect domestic agriculture from subsidized foreign products. Price bands for agriculture were created in 2001 for select goods, such as "hard yellow corn, milled rice, white sugar, and whole milk powder." However, over the years the price bands became increasingly liberalized, and by 2015 the price bands became nonexistent in practice. Castillo also spoke about his plan to industrialize coca leaf production and build an airport in Pichari so that goods can go directly to the national market.

In a speech before a crowd, then Prime Minister Guido Bellido threatened Congress to approve the agrarian reform. "If Congress does not approve it, let the congressmen go and let the people choose other congressmen." Afterward, the attendees shouted: "Close the Congress!" Peru's Congress has been accused of obstructionism by supporters of the Castillo Administration.

=== Healthcare ===
==== Vaccinations ====
Under the Castillo Administration, the government signed a deal with Russia to build a domestic vaccine factory. This factory, which will produce the Sputnik vaccine, is expected to become operational in 2023.

==== Free cancer treatment ====
On 10 August 2021, Castillo passed the National Cancer Law, which guaranteed free and universal cancer treatment regardless of insurance. The law had been proposed under the previous Congress, but hadn't been ratified.

=== Media ===
Castillo has been accused of being evasive with the press. He has not offered any interviews to inform of projects or ideas, and the Council of Ministers has suspended press conferences. Members of Castillo's cabinet have expressed reluctance of communicating with the press, due to the belief that the media maliciously distorts information. According to a poll from 17 August 2021, 78% of respondents believe that the president maintains an inadequate relationship with the press, while only 15% of respondents consider the president's relationship to be adequate.

On 20 September 2021, the Free Peru caucus proposed a bill which would declare the "public necessity and national interest the fair and equitable distribution of the electromagnetic and radioelectric spectrum in radio, television and other media." This would allow the government to take direct control of the media given an "exceptional and transitory nature." The bill was signed by 7 members of Free Peru, out of the 37 Congressmen it wields. Some newspapers have claimed that those who gave their signature to the bill are close to Vladimir Cerrón.

The opposition has criticized the broad and vague nature of this proposed media bill, which could be applied to the internet and any information platform. Castillo's Foreign Minister, Óscar Maúrtua also condemned the proposed bill, saying that it would "certainly affects international commitments... in areas as specific as human rights, of which, this administration of President Castillo, is fundamentally supportive and is very committed." According to witnesses from a business meeting with the President, Castillo had no knowledge of the proposed bill and said that he would hold a meeting with the Free Peru caucus to discuss the matter.

Afterward, a Free Peru parliamentarian withdrew her signature from the bill. While the bill still had enough signatures to be presented before the ordinary committee, nothing more came of it.

On 23 November 2021, President Castillo criticized the media for "distorting reality" and malicious editing. This came after numerous media outlets reported that Arequipa residents called for Castillo to be impeached while he visited the city, which he claimed was not true.

On 4 December 2021, Vice President Dina Boluarte announced that there would be changes in the Government, with one of them being greater communication of President Castillo and the press. Boluarte also announced that the Hall of Chroniclers of the Government Palace was reopened since 1 December 2021, which would allow accredited journalists to carry out news coverage from within the Government Palace and make it easier for journalists to reach out to the President.

=== Constituent assembly ===
One of Castillo's principal goals is to convene the constituent assembly to repeal and rewrite the Fujimori-era constitution. This measure is unlikely to pass in an opposition-controlled Congress. However, Free Peru and the Vice President have been collecting signatures to enact a constituent assembly via referendum. Likewise, the opposition has been gathering signatures against the proposal. Legal experts doubt whether these signatures will allow a constituent assembly to be held.

Following the resignation of the Bellido cabinet, Prime Minister Mirtha Vásquez stated that changing the constitution is not a priority, despite it having been one of Castillo's main campaign promises.

On 1 December 2021, Free Peru's spokesperson Waldemar Cerrón criticized a proposed Congressional bill which would require constitutional reforms to be "approved by Congress with an absolute majority of the legal number of members" to be submitted for referendum. This proposal would restrict the powers of the constituent assembly.

=== Drug policy ===
As part of the US-led war on drugs, Peru has historically pursued a coca-eradication policy. However, during his electoral campaign, Pedro Castillo pledged to expel DEA agents from Peru. In April 2021, under then President Francisco Sagasti, coca eradication operations in the VRAEM were suspended. In September, following Castillo's inauguration, coca eradication was resumed in all areas except the VRAEM, which is the area with the most coca cultivation. Under the Vásquez cabinet, Interior Minister Luis Barranzuela was asked whether he ordered Coca eradication to be suspended in the VRAEM, which he denied. Barranzuela also said that the Interior Ministry has no influence on Devida, the agency in charge of anti-drug policy.

Later, the Free Peru caucus proposed to legalize the commercialization and industrial cultivation of the coca leaf. Currently, coca leaf consumption is allowed for "traditional purposes." The proposed bill would also declare the coca leaf "the natural heritage of the nation." Prime Minister Mirtha Vásquez claimed that coca farmers are "fed up" with the permanent cycle of coca eradication and replantation. Vásquez stated that she would pursue binding agreements with legal coca producers while cracking down on drug trafficking.

On 19 November 2021, the new Interior Minister Avelino Guillén pledged to increase the eradication of coca crops.

== Foreign affairs ==
=== UNASUR ===
One of the principal foreign policies for the Castillo's Administration is to strengthen Latin American integration.

=== European Union ===
In August 2021, Foreign Minister Béjar announced Peru's withdrawal, without officially carrying it out, from the Lima Group and support for the International Contact Group of the European Union for a negotiated solution between the regime of Nicolás Maduro and the opposition regarding the Venezuelan crisis. In addition, Béjar announced his intention, as foreign minister, to reconstitute the UNASUR and strengthen the CELAC, although this was not officially carried out.In September 2021, the Peruvian government signed the "Development Objectives Grant Agreement" with the United States Agency for International Development (USAID) to receive 321 million dollars through 2026. The agreement was signed between Foreign Minister Maúrtua and Jene Thomas, USAID mission director, in the presence of U.S. ambassador Lisa Kenna, who before joining the diplomatic service had been an agent of the CIA. During that same month, the Peruvian government signed the United Nations Sustainable Development Cooperation Framework in Peru 2022-2026 for 180 million dollars, with the framework's preparation led by the resident coordinator of the United Nations System (UNS) in the country to "contribute to the efforts of the Government of Peru in fulfilling the 2030 Agenda and the Sustainable Development Goals, as well as the national development priorities with which this roadmap aligns", also establishing "the general guidelines for developing joint work plans between the Government of Peru and twenty-two AFPs [UN Agencies, Funds and Programmes]" over the following five years.

=== OAS ===
During that month of September, Castillo met with Luis Almagro, secretary general of the Organization of American States (OAS), in Washington. Almagro offered his support for the implementation of public policies. In October 2022, following Castillo's request to the OAS to send a mission to Peru arguing that there was an alleged coup attempt by the opposition, the OAS sent a high-level group to visit Peru, analyze the situation, and seek dialogue between both sides, while also questioning the figure of the moral incapacity vacancy. Because of this, Castillo expressed his approval of the OAS's actions through his social media accounts.

=== OECD ===
In October 2021, Castillo sent a letter to the secretary-general of the Organisation for Economic Co-operation and Development (OECD), Mathias Cormann, to ratify Peru's willingness to join the organization. In January 2022, Castillo signed the invitation letter to begin Peru's accession process to the OECD.

=== European Union ===
In November, Castillo met with Josep Borrell, high representative of the European Union (EU), where Castillo highlighted the solid relationship between Peru and the EU, expressing his "firm will not only to deepen our ties with the European Union, but also to attract European investment for the development of Peru's immense potential". Borrell, meanwhile, expressed the EU's support for Castillo's legitimacy. In October 2022, the Peruvian foreign minister signed in Brussels an EU-Peru Memorandum of Understanding and a Framework Participation Agreement for Peru's participation in crisis management missions and operations, whether military or civilian, organized by the EU. In this way, the Peruvian armed forces and the police would participate voluntarily in such EU operations. In addition, the EU announced a contribution of 14 million euros to Peru for the ecological transition of the Andean country.

=== RUNASUR ===
By December 2021, former Bolivian president Evo Morales announced the second summit of RUNASUR to be held in Cusco. The announcement generated various criticisms, with 11 Peruvian diplomats issuing a public statement denouncing RUNASUR as "a clear external threat to sovereignty, independence and national security" because it could be an instrument through which Bolivia would obtain access to the sea, and urging the government not to allow the summit to take place. In addition, it became known that the Revolutionary Agrarian Federation of Cusco (FARTAC), one of RUNASUR's organizers, advocated for the presence of the Movement for Socialism (MAS) party in Peru, and that the party, then led by Morales, had established a branch in the city of Cusco under the leadership of the Bolivian Isabel Ara Condori. Four trips by Morales to Peru since Castillo's victory in the 2021 elections were reported, during which he met with Castillo and Vladimir Cerrón, leader of Perú Libre. In November of that same year, the foreign relations committee of the Peruvian congress declared Morales a persona non grata for interference in the country's internal politics and the carrying out of proselytizing actions "clearly detrimental to the interests of the Peruvian people". The foreign ministry issued a statement declaring that the RUNASUR summit was not linked to the government. Ultimately, the summit was never held.

=== Bolivia ===
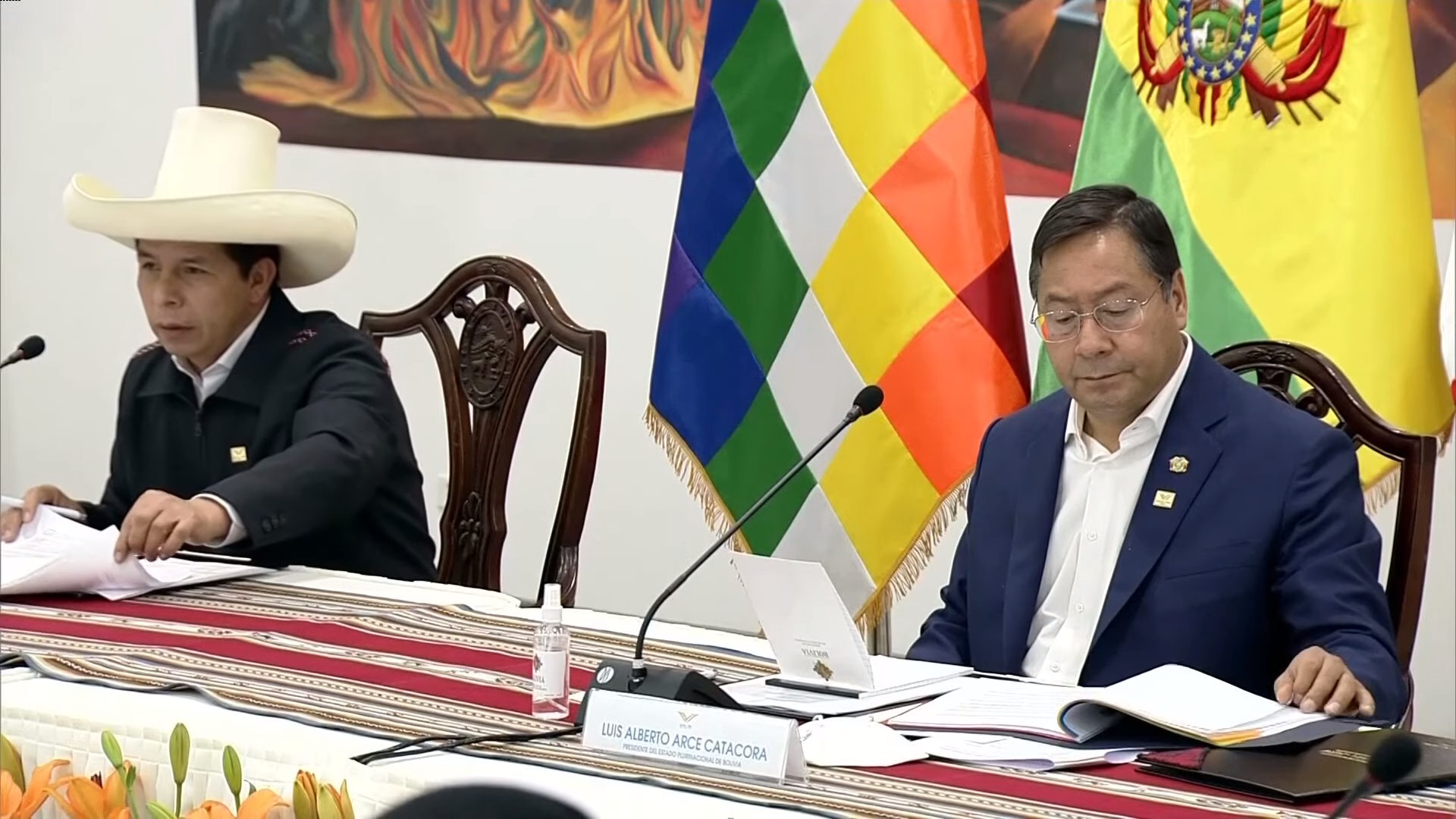
Castillo and Luis Arce, Bolivian president, during the Peru-Bolivia Binational Cabinet.

In October 2021, Carina Palacios Quincho assumed office as Peruvian ambassador to Bolivia. However, a scandal erupted regarding her appointment because Palacios was a founder of Perú Libre and a former official of the Junín regional government during the administration of Vladimir Cerrón, leader of that political organization. In addition, it was revealed that Palacios had issued documents signing herself as an engineer despite not holding such a degree at the time. During that month, Castillo met with Luis Arce, president of Bolivia, within the framework of the Peru-Bolivia Binational Cabinet.

In 2018, Castillo expressed his support for Bolivia obtaining access to the sea, an act that was recorded in a video. This sparked a scandal when the audiovisual material was revealed, prompting journalist Fernando del Rincón in January 2022 to ask Castillo about that possibility. Castillo stated that on that occasion he had not made those remarks as president but that "now we will consult the people. For that, the people need to express themselves. If Peru agrees, I owe myself to the people; I would never do things that the people do not want". Subsequently, Castillo apologized for what he had said. The foreign ministry, for its part, denied that the government promoted a cession of Peruvian territory to the highland country so that it could obtain access to the sea.

=== Brazil ===
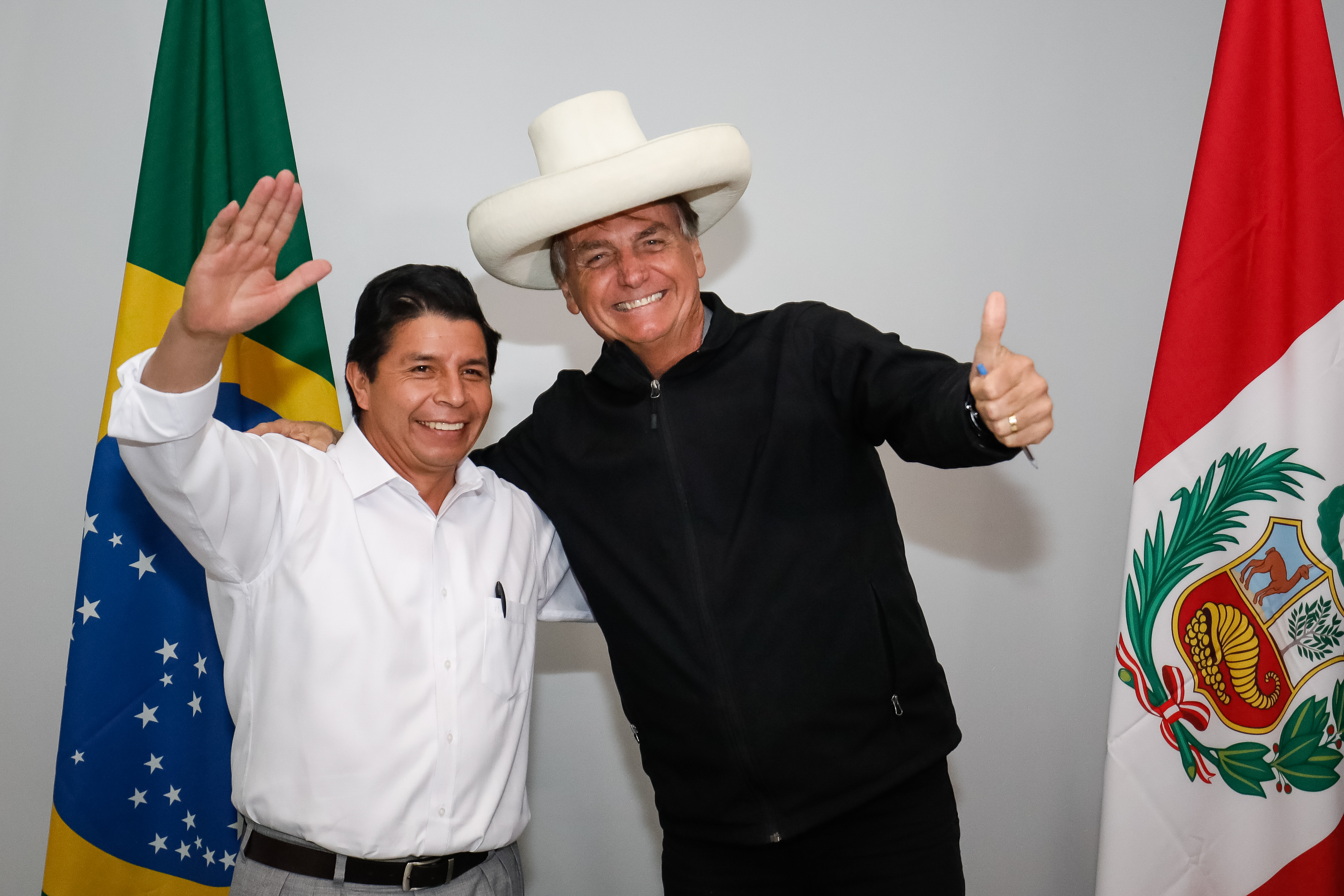
Meeting between Pedro Castillo and Jair Bolsonaro, president of Brazil

In February 2022, Castillo held a bilateral meeting with then Brazilian president Jair Bolsonaro in Porto Velho. Although Bolsonaro, who was politically right-wing, harshly criticized Castillo's victory in 2021, after the meeting the Brazilian president assured that the differences had been overcome, that what had previously been declared had been forgotten, stating that Castillo was a defender of liberty and "conservative values", and that both countries would work to maintain a good relationship. The foreign ministries of both countries issued a joint statement agreeing to strengthen relations between both nations and reinforce the "strategic alliance".

=== Cuba ===
In December 2021, the new Cuban ambassador to Peru, Carlos Rafael Zamora Rodríguez, alias "El Gallo", arrived in Peru, linked to the Cuban Directorate of Intelligence. It was reported that he had previously served as ambassador to Bolivia in 2019 during the government of Evo Morales. Upon his arrival, Zamora presented his credentials to Castillo, announcing that efforts were being made to strengthen diplomatic relations between both nations.

=== United States ===
Despite increased ties to the Latin American left, the Castillo Administration has maintained cordial, if not friendly, relations with the US. Relations began when the US State Department denied Keiko's claims of electoral fraud in the 2021 Peruvian general election. Afterward, relations were further normalized under former Foreign Minister Héctor Béjar, when both countries agreed to hold bilateral meetings every 6 months. Additionally, the US pledged cooperation in vaccines, and aid for the poorest regions of Peru.

Relations with the US have been maintained after the resignation of Héctor Béjar. Castillo has also renewed Peru's agreement with USAID for another 5 years. This decision has been protested by a congressman from his party, who accused USAID of being an "accomplice in all the coups in Latin America and a spy agency within our homeland."

On 23 October 2021, Castillo gave a speech at the FOLAC 2021, organized by the chambers of commerce of the US and Latin American countries. Castillo stated that "it is a propitious moment to consolidate the strong ties of friendship and cooperation with the United States. We have a new opportunity."

=== Lima Group ===
With Castillo taking a more pro-Venezuela stance, many thought that Peru would leave the Lima Group, a consortium of countries with the goal of aiding the Venezuelan opposition. Starting 6 August 2021, Venezuelan and Cuban state media started claiming that Peru had left the Lima Group. While foreign media had announced Peru's exit, there was no word from the Peruvian government, which left many confused. Furthermore, Luis Arce, the President of Bolivia, celebrated Peru's supposed departure from the Lima Group.

There was still no word from the Castillo Administration. However, Peru's departure from the Lima Group had been seemingly confirmed by Free Peru's General Secretary, Vladimir Cerrón. As a result, domestic media and Congress was left unsure on whether Peru had left the organization or not. Eventually, members of Congress sent forward a motion to confirm Peru's status in the Lima Group. After a while, Prime Minister Bellido confirmed that Peru had not left the Lima Group, claiming that the issue had not been formally discussed. However, Bellido also mentioned that the Foreign Ministry was evaluating Peru's status in the Lima Group.

As of 20 September 2021, the permanent representative of Peru to the OAS has stated that the Lima Group "does not exist, because it has completed its cycle." Later, the Vice Foreign Minister pointed out "The Lima Group is a mechanism, it is not an international organization, and therefore mechanisms work when they need to work. The Lima Group has not issued any pronouncement since January 5 of this year, and that one does not even belong to the current management." No other country has mentioned the non-existence of the Lima Group.

=== Venezuela ===
Despite Castillo having recognized the Venezuelan government as democratic during the electoral campaign, Castillo's Vice Foreign Minister has claimed that Peru has declared that there is no legitimate authority within Venezuela since 5 January 2021. The Vice Foreign Minister has claimed that Peru supports "intra-Venezuelan dialogue" and a negotiated solution to the crisis. While not a recognition of the Maduro government, this represents a shift away from Peru's previous stance of backing the National Assembly, which opposes Maduro.

The next day, then Prime Minister Guido Bellido rejected the Vice Foreign Minister's claims that Peru did not recognize a legitimate authority in Venezuela. Bellido claimed that the Vice Foreign Minister's claim was against the Peruvian government's position, and that President Castillo had a meeting with Venezuelan President Maduro to solve the Venezuelan migrant crisis. Bellido also implied that he was willing to replace the Foreign Ministry if they didn't like the government's stance on Venezuela. However, later that day, the Interior Minister Juan Carrasco claimed that although he respected Bellido's views, he backed the Foreign Ministry's stance regarding Peru's position on Venezuela.

Castillo's meeting with President Maduro wasn't recorded on his official agenda. As such, Foreign Minister Óscar Maúrtua was summoned before Congress to explain on the matter. Maúrtua said that Castillo did not plan to meet with Nicolas Maduro, and that the meeting was brief. Maúrtua further added that Castillo met Maduro during the VI Summit of CELAC, where many Latin American leaders were present. The Foreign Minister stated that in such multilateral events, spontaneous meetings are natural.

Subsequently, the Free Peru caucus accused Maúrtua of trying to impose his political agenda on the President, and called for Maúrtua's resignation: "The foreign minister remained silent... in the face of the audacity of his Vice Foreign Minister Luis Enrique Chávez to contradict the president in his decision to maintain friendly relations and cooperation with Venezuela and the Maduro government. Therefore, having transgressed the provisions of Article 118, paragraph 11 of the Political Constitution, our caucus demands the resignation of both the minister and the vice minister."

On 15 October 2021, following the appointment of the Vásquez cabinet, Richard Rojas Garcia was appointed as Peru's ambassador to Venezuela. This in effect established official diplomatic relations with Venezuela. Some media outlets have claimed that Rojas is the right-hand man of Vladimir Cerrón. However, soon afterward a judge ruled that Rojas could not leave the country for 6 months, due to his alleged link with members of "Los Dinámicos del Centro."

Afterward, Foreign Minister Óscar Maúrtua claimed that Rojas' appointment as ambassador to Venezuela never took place, "since the corresponding process was not concluded. In this sense, Peru is proceeding to inform the Government of Venezuela that the proposed appointment of Mr. Richard Rojas García is without effect." Subsequently, Free Peru accused Maúrtua of sabotaging Rojas' appointment as ambassador to Venezuela.

=== China ===
Castillo has sought to improve relations with China. The Castillo Administration sees China as an essential trade partner, and as a partner for vaccine procurement. China is the main buyer of Peru's copper, a crucial source of the country's tax revenue.

In the first week of Castillo's government, cabinet members met with Liang Yu, China's ambassador to Peru, and executives from major mining companies from the Asian country, following campaign announcements in which Castillo announced higher mining taxes and the review of tax stability agreements signed with transnational corporations, which caused concern among Chinese companies. Following a meeting between Yu and Roberto Sánchez, minister of foreign trade and tourism, it was announced that, virtually, technical teams from Peru and China were working on the "optimization of the FTA between both countries".

Subsequently, in February 2022, lobbyist Karelim López testified before prosecutors about the existence of an alleged mafia within the Ministry of Transport and Communications (MTC) that was led by Castillo and Juan Silva, minister of the MTC, and included the congressmen known as "Los Niños" in order to steer public works in exchange for favors. According to López, the MTC benefited Chinese companies, principally the state-owned construction company China Civil Engineering Construction Corporation, which partnered with the company INIP Ingeniería Integración de Proyectos, the latter led by Roberto Aguilar Quispe, forming a partnership that won contracts between August 2021 and January 2022 worth 581 million soles. In August 2025, Attorney General Delia Espinoza presented a constitutional complaint before congress against Castillo and 24 congressmen, including those known as "Los Niños", for steering bids in favor of Chinese companies belonging to the so-called "Dragon Club".

=== Sahrawi Arab Democratic Republic ===
The Castillo Administration recognized the Sahrawi Arab Democratic Republic, a partially-recognized state claimed by Morocco. Although the recognition came without forewarning, officially it was due to Castillo's push for a foreign policy based on self-determination and non-intervention. The Congressional opposition has opposed the recognition of the SADR, claiming that it creates geopolitical instability and risks Peru's relations with the Middle East.

=== Nicaragua ===
The Castillo Administration refused to recognize the results of the 2021 Nicaraguan general election, saying it did not meet the minimum criteria for free elections. Free Peru's leader Vladimir Cerrón blamed Foreign Minister Óscar Maúrtua for the refusal to recognize Nicaragua's election. Cerrón released a statement saying "Regrettable position adopted by the Ministry of Foreign Affairs - Foreign Ministry of Peru, regarding the elections in Nicaragua, the same position adopted by the reactionary forces to ignore the electoral victory of Pedro Castillo."

=== Norway ===
The appointment of Isabel Soria Reátegui as ambassador to Norway in July 2022 sparked a scandal because Soria had no university education or diplomatic background, instead being a member of Perú Libre and a campaign coordinator in Sweden. To enable her appointment, the Peruvian foreign ministry summarized and edited Soria's curriculum vitae to remove unnecessary information and correct spelling mistakes. However, this situation led Soria to accuse the foreign ministry of discrediting her by editing her curriculum, complaining to Castillo and requesting that he send Norway a new version of her curriculum. In response, the foreign ministry sent a new curriculum to Norway, including the unnecessary information and spelling mistakes.

=== Panama ===
In August 2021, Richard Rojas was appointed ambassador to Panama, a man linked to Vladimir Cerrón and investigated in the alleged money laundering case known as "Los Dinámicos del Centro", with investigations initiated after an attempt by Cerrón to withdraw 370 thousand soles with a check in Rojas's name. In addition, Rojas, who had served as press chief during Castillo's campaign, had no experience in the diplomatic world nor any technical or university degree. Ultimately, Rojas was rejected by Panama for the position following 30 days of silence after the Peruvian proposal had been issued.

Subsequently, a scandal erupted regarding the intention to acquire espionage equipment by Jorge Hernández Fernández, alias "El Español". According to prosecutorial investigations, "El Español" coordinated a network whose objective was to intimidate and attack those investigating Castillo's government, with Castillo being the driving force behind the initiative. As part of this, "El Español" traveled to Panama to attend a technology fair with Fujimorist congressman Luis Cordero Jon Tay and Carlos Daniel Barba, a retired naval officer. In that country, they inquired about the equipment to be purchased, making contact with a company that sold interception of communications via WhatsApp. "El Español" told Barba that Castillo was willing to support the purchase, but the acquisition was not completed because Barba had been accredited by the Peruvian government.

=== Russia ===
Following the proclamation of Castillo's victory in the election, Vladimir Putin congratulated him through a statement. In August 2021, Foreign Minister Béjar met with the ambassador of Russia to Peru, Igor Romanchenko, where they coordinated the reactivation of bilateral relations between both nations as well as efforts to combat the COVID-19 pandemic. In 2023, congressman Ernesto Bustamante recounted that Romanchenko, "after having a few drinks", commented at a meeting at the embassy of South Korea that the United States had "bought 20 thousand votes" to secure Castillo's victory. Romanchenko also complained about Castillo's electoral victory and mentioned that he would have preferred Keiko Fujimori to win the election instead.

=== International trips ===
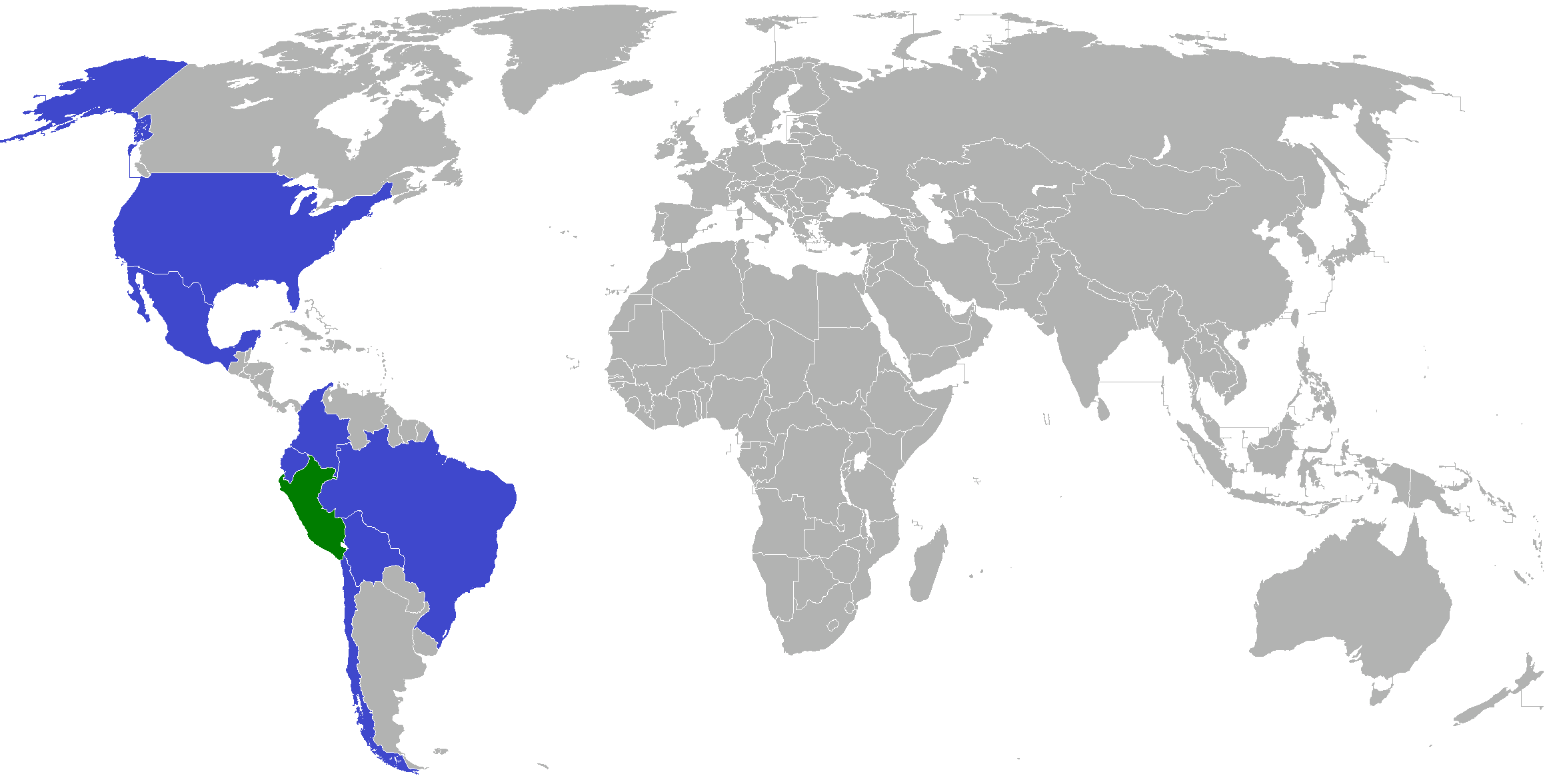
Presidential trips made by the President of Peru Pedro Castillo Terrones during the 16 months and 9 days he remained in power from 28 July 2021 to 7 December 2022.

==== 2021 ====
	Legislative resolution	Date	Country	Details	File
1	No. 31351	17–19 September	Mexico	He participated in the VI Summit of Heads of State and Government of the Community of Latin American and Caribbean States (CELAC). He met with Mexican billionaire Carlos Slim; with his counterpart from Mexico, Andrés Manuel López Obrador; from Bolivia, Luis Arce; and from Cuba, Miguel Díaz-Canel. He visited the Amauta school, which is run by a Peruvian teacher.	
1	No. 31351	19–21 September	United States	He participated in the session of the Permanent Council of the Organization of American States and in the General Debate of the 76th United Nations General Assembly. He met with the Secretary General of the OAS, Luis Almagro; with the director of the Pan American Health Organization, Carissa Etienne; with the president of the World Bank, David Malpass; with the managing director of the International Monetary Fund, Kristalina Georgieva; and with businesspeople from the American Chamber of Commerce of Peru.	
2	No. 31356	30 October	Bolivia	He participated in the Presidential Meeting and the VI Binational Cabinet of Ministers Peru–Bolivia. He traveled accompanied by the President of the Council of Ministers, Mirtha Vásquez, and 14 other ministers. He was decorated with the Order of the Condor of the Andes in the rank of Grand Collar.	

==== 2022 ====
	Legislative resolution	Date	Country	Details	File
3	No. 31392	13 January	Colombia	He participated in the Presidential Meeting and the VI Binational Cabinet Meeting of Ministers Peru–Colombia. He traveled accompanied by First Lady Lilia Paredes; the President of the Council of Ministers, Mirtha Vásquez; and seven other members of the cabinet.	
4	No. 31397	26 January	Colombia	He attended the 16th Pacific Alliance Summit.	
5	No. 31398	3 February	Brazil	He met with his Brazilian counterpart, Jair Bolsonaro.	
6	No. 31430	10–11 March	Chile	He attended the presidential inauguration ceremony of Gabriel Boric. He met with his counterpart from Ecuador, Guillermo Lasso; from Bolivia, Luis Arce; and from Argentina, Alberto Fernández. In addition, he held a meeting with representatives of the Peruvian community residing in Santiago. He visited the tomb of former Chilean president Salvador Allende and left a floral offering.	
7	No. 31459	29 April	Ecuador	He participated in the Presidential Meeting and the 14th Binational Cabinet Meeting of Ministers Peru–Ecuador.	
8	No. 31489	8–10 June	United States	He participated in the 9th Summit of the Americas. He met with the president of Colombia, Iván Duque; and of Chile, Gabriel Boric; with representatives of Google and of different multinational companies.	
9	No. 31574	18–22 September	United States	He participated in the Transforming Education Summit and the General Debate of the 77th Session of the United Nations General Assembly. He met with the Minister of Foreign Affairs of the Sahrawi Arab Democratic Republic, Mohamed Salem Uld Salek; with the Secretary General of the OAS, Luis Almagro; and with the Secretary of State of the Holy See, Pietro Parolin.	

== Congressional affairs ==
=== Confidence ===
The formation of the Bellido cabinet was instantly met with opposition, and in the opposition-controlled Congress, there was the risk that Congress would not give trust to the cabinet. Some believed that the Bellido cabinet was a "shock cabinet" with the attempt of baiting Congress into denying confidence twice so that it could be shut down, as it was during the 2019–2020 Peruvian constitutional crisis. A congressman from Free Peru claimed that Congress was attempting to impeach the President, and warned that if trust is denied twice then Congress will be dissolved. While Vice President Dina Boluarte rejected the possibility of dissolving Congress, it nonetheless remained a contentious issue.

During the impeachment attempt against former Labor Minister Iber Maraví over his alleged link to Shining Path, then Prime Minister Guido Bellido threatened to use trust to defend Maraví. As a result, Congress passed a law which would reinterpret the question of confidence and would restrict its applicability. Justice Minister Aníbal Torres claimed that this reinterpretation would challenge the constitutional balance of power, and stated that he would challenge the reinterpretation bill via the Constitutional Court. It's worth noting that the makeup of the Constitutional Court is set to be replaced by Congress, as its current term expired in 2019 (the court remained in operation as Congress couldn't agree on successors).

Following the dismissal of the Bellido cabinet, the new Vásquez cabinet hoped to replace Bellido's ultra-confrontational approach to Congress with a more conciliatory approach. Prime Minister Mirtha Vásquez held a meeting with members of Congress to negotiate on the question of trust and the presidential impeachment. Vásquez proposed a new version of the question of trust which she claimed would not cause an imbalance of power. However, it became clear that Congress would stick to their own bill. Free Peru's ally, Together for Peru, proposed a bill that would dissolve Congress if the President was impeached for moral or physical incapacity. Following that, new parliamentary elections would be held. The bill failed to pass.

On 22 October 2021, the government presented a lawsuit before the Constitutional Court (CT) that Congress' reinterpretation of the question of confidence was unconstitutional. The CT unanimously admitted the case on 28 October 2021. On 2 November 2021, Eloy Espinosa-Saldaña, who was appointed rapporteur of the case, asked Congress to quickly respond to the lawsuit. Meanwhile, the Minister of Justice, Aníbal Torres, claimed that if the CT respected its past judgements, it should declare the unconstitutionality of the law that reinterprets the question of trust.

On 16 November 2021, Congress formalized changes that would allow itself to reject a question of confidence as inadmissible if it's not in line with the restrictions previously passed by itself. Said restrictions are currently being challenged in the Constitutional Court.

=== Commissions ===
Traditionally, the presidency of the Constitutional Commission went to the ruling party. Despite Free Peru being both the largest party and the ruling party, the Constitutional Commission was given to Popular Force, which is the second largest party in Congress and part of the opposition against Castillo. Popular Force is led by Keiko Fujimori, who was Castillo's opponent during the second round of the 2021 Peruvian general election, and accused Free Peru of conducting electoral fraud.

Due to the large number of teachers within its ranks, Free Peru desired to preside over the Educational Commission. However, the presidency of the Educational Commission was given to Popular Renewal, which is also part of the opposition against Castillo. Pedro Castillo went to Congress to request that the presidency of the Educational Commission be reconsidered. However, Congress did not change any positions within the Educational Commission. It is believed that this may have played a part in the formation of the Popular and Magisterial Political Party.

In the end, Free Peru did not get a single commission it wanted. Ollanta Humala, Peru's former Pink tide president, called the distribution of commissions "an abuse by Congress." However, Humala also criticized aspects of Castillo's management.

=== Electoral regulations ===
With 46 votes in favor, 50 against, and 28 abstentions, Congress approved the creation of a commission to investigate alleged electoral fraud in the 2021 Peruvian general election Allegations of electoral fraud were denied by the National Office of Electoral Processes, the National Jury of Elections, the OAS, the United States, and the European Union.

Later, Congress green-lit a motion to change the electoral rules for the 2022 Peruvian municipal and regional elections. Because it is prohibited to modify electoral rules when the election is less than a year away, the Constitutional Committee has little time to pass new regulations. Previously, an attempt to suspend open primary elections for the 2022 regional and municipal elections failed, due to it only getting 45 votes in favor.

=== Campaign finances reports ===
Many parties failed to report their campaign finances in a timely fashion, leading to suspicion over the use of the funds.

On 21 November 2021, the ONPE sent auditors to supervise the management of party funds. The first parties scheduled to be audited are the Purple Party, Alliance for Progress, We Are Peru, and Popular Force. Later, Go on Country, Free Peru, and Together for Peru will be audited.

=== Evo Morales declared persona non grata ===
On 20 August 2021, Congress voted against a proposal to declare the former Bolivian president Evo Morales a persona non grata. However, on 22 November 2021, the Foreign Relations Commission of Congress, led by Popular Force, agreed to declare Evo Morales a persona non grata for "his negative political activism" and "political interference" in Peruvian territory, referring to repeated trips Morales undertook to rally support for Castillo's agenda. The Foreign Relations Commission (FRC) also questioned Morales' protection by state security and use of official vehicles. The FRC's resolution urged authorities to take "necessary actions" to prohibit Morales from entering Peru.

The Free Peru parliamentarian Margot Palacios spoke out against the FRC's resolution, saying that "Only a colonial mentality, narrow, premodern, medieval and discriminatory, can deny entry to Peru to a brother who has done much for the Andean culture, of which Peruvians and Bolivians are part of. For several centuries, we were one state: the Tahuantinsuyo."

== Controversies ==
=== Influence of Vladimir Cerrón ===
Vladimir Cerrón is the General Secretary of Free Peru, who represents the Marxist–Leninist faction of the party. Cerrón was previously the governor of Junín, but was convicted for corruption and given a suspended sentence. Cerrón has repeatedly denied such charges, stating that he's a victim of lawfare and political persecution. The indictment prevents Cerrón from running for public office.

During the 2021 Peruvian general election, Castillo distanced himself from Cerrón, saying that Cerrón "will not even be a doorman in any of the institutions of the State." However, Castillo has been accused of appointing government officials and ministers who are close to Cerrón. These include the appointment of Waldemar Cerrón, Vladimir's brother, as Free Peru's spokesman in Congress, despite Waldemar being investigated for money laundering.

Waldemar has also been under investigation in Los Dinámicos del Centro, an alleged criminal organization that's investigated for money laundering. The investigations also include Vladimir and then Prime Minister Bellido. Vladimir has accused the investigations of being political persecution.

Later, a number of alleged members of Los Dinámicos del Centro escaped from the country. Prime Minister Mirtha Vásquez stated that they have been included in Peru's registry of most wanted fugitives.

=== La Resistencia ===
La Resistencia (The Resistance) is a right-wing decentralized group that opposes the Castillo Administration. The group has been behind threats of harassment, verbal assaults, and physical attacks on citizens and government officials. La Resistencia has accused their opponents of being terrorists and Senderistas. Following repeated threats against the former supreme prosecutor Avelino Guillén and the journalist Jaime Chincha, the Ministry of the Interior has ordered an investigation into the alleged criminal organization.

On 7 October 2021, approximately ten members of La Resistencia assaulted a car which had journalists inside. The car had stopped due to a red light, which the group took advantage of by repeatedly hitting the car's windows and insulting its passengers. The journalists managed to escape, but the car was battered.

On 18 October 2021, members of La Resistencia interrupted the initial book sale of "Imagine a better Peru... and let's make it happen." by former President Francisco Sagasti and blocked the doorways as to prevent people from leaving. There were shouts against Sagasti, decrying him as a "murderer" and a "terrorist." Previously, Sagasti had gotten backlash from proponents that there was electoral fraud in the 2021 Peruvian general election, due to him repeatedly denying that fraud took place and handing the presidency to Castillo.

On 8 November 2021, the Interior Ministry claimed that groups consisting of ex-military and ex-police personnel are appearing, many of whom being veterans of the war against the Shining Path. Representatives from said groups and other related groups claimed to have pacifist intentions, citing plans for a march and their right to "freely defend themselves and protest."

=== Business financing of transport strike ===
Leaked chats showed that a group of 12 businessmen with ties to the SNI (National Society of Industries) pledged to each donate US$1,000 each to support a proposed transport strike being organized against the Castillo Administration. The SNI distanced itself from the controversy, saying that it didn't seek to generate instability, and instead sought dialogue with the government.

== Cabinets of the Castillo presidency ==
=== Bellido cabinet ===
Bellido Cabinet
- Cabinet of Peru
- 2021
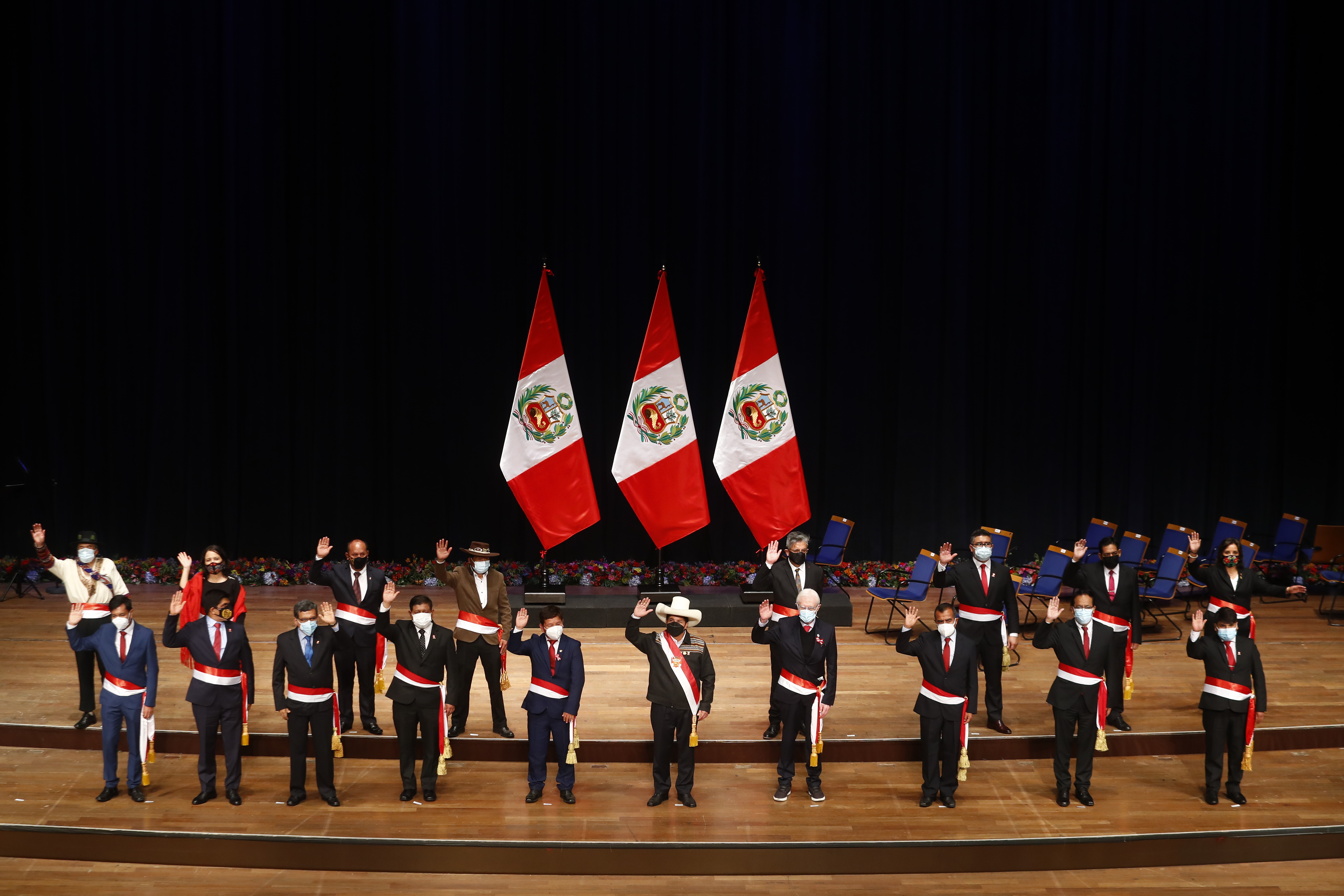
- Cabinet of Guido Bellido
- Date formed: 29 July 2021
- Date dissolved: 6 October 2021

People and organisations
- President of the Republic: Pedro Castillo
- President of the Council of Ministers: Guido Bellido
- No. of ministers: 19
- Member party: Non-partisan (10); Broad Front (3); Free Peru (2); Together for Peru (2); New Peru (2); National United Renaissance (1)
- Opposition parties: Popular Force; Go on Country; Popular Renewal; Popular Action; Alliance for Progress; We Are Peru
- Opposition leader: Rafael López Aliaga

History
- Legislature term: 2021–2026
- Predecessor: Bermúdez Cabinet
- Successor: Vásquez cabinet

The Bellido Cabinet, made by Castillo, was widely criticized in the media and from various political opponents of the new government. Some journalists, like Fernando Vivas from El Comercio, called it the "shock cabinet," due to the belief that it was meant to bait Congress into denying confidence twice so that Congress could be shut down, as it was during the 2019–2020 Peruvian constitutional crisis. A congressman from Free Peru claimed that Congress was attempting to impeach Castillo, and warned that if trust is denied twice then Congress will be dissolved. Vice President Dina Boluarte said that Congress would not be dissolved.

The cabinet led to the Purple Party and We Are Peru leaving the government coalition, and sparked backlash from Congress and sectors of the public. President Pedro Castillo appointed the new head of the Joint Command of the Armed Forces (CC. FF. AA.); on 3 August, Manuel Gómez de la Torre replaced General César Astudillo as General Commander. Changes were also made for the general commanders of the Army, Navy, and Air Force.

On 6 October 2021, President Castillo announced the resignation of the Guido Bellido cabinet, citing instability in the country. Under Peruvian law, the resignation of the Prime Minister dissolves the cabinet. A new cabinet was formed, led by Mirtha Vásquez.

==== Resignation of Héctor Béjar ====
Almost immediately after his appointment as Foreign Minister, the media began reporting on Héctor Béjar's past. Béjar had been part of the National Liberation Army during the 1960s and had met Che Guevara according to his book "Peru 1965: Notes on a Guerrilla Experience." In a video published in November 2020, Béjar had said that 'terrorism began in the Navy' and that 'the Shining Path was trained by the CIA', leading to significant public backlash. Later, the Peruvian Navy put out a statement about wanting Béjar to retract, and claimed that Béjar's statement were an affront against those who fought against terrorism. Following that, Congress started an interpellation process against Béjar, which was seen by manyas a show trial that would be almost certainly followed by impeachment. However, Béjar resigned before the interpellations began. According to Béjar, Prime Minister Guido Bellido asked him to resign to prevent him from speaking before Congress, which he said was a way of censoring him. Béjar held the position of Foreign Minister for just 19 days. His replacement was the career diplomat Óscar Maúrtua.

After his resignation, Béjar posted "I am free again!!!" on Facebook. Later, he would claim that this was the beginning of a soft coup against the Castillo's government. Béjar also claimed that there is a group in the Navy and the extreme right that does not want an independent foreign policy. He also claimed that his phrases were distorted and taken out of context. Béjar stated that his expressions on the Navy were about a bomb plot against the Minister of War in 1975, and an attack against two Cuban fishing boats off the coast of Peru in 1977. Declassified documents show that the US Embassy suspected that these attacks were carried out by right-wing sectors of the Navy, which were unhappy with the military junta's close ties to Cuba at the time.

==== Interpellation and censure of Iber Maraví ====
The Labor Minister Iber Maraví has been accused of having links to the Shining Path, claims which he has denied. Police reports from 1980, 1981, and 2004 suspected that Maraví had ties to the Shining Path and Conare-Sutep, a teacher union linked with MOVADEF. Maraví maintained his innocence, stating that he has no criminal or judicial record and that the police used torture against detainees to get them to falsely implicate themselves or others as terrorists. Two of the witnesses who accused Maraví were convicted of terrorism and escaped from jail less than a year later along with several notorious Shining Path leaders. Maraví has acknowledged that his wife and mother-in-law signed forms to register MOVADEF as a political party. However, he claims that the event occurred without his consent. Maraví has claimed that the allegations against him are devoid of substance and were designed to tarnish his reputation. He stated that he has openly condemned any terrorist act and expressed his conviction for respecting institutions and democracy.

Initially, Prime Minister Guido Bellido asked for Maraví to resign. However, the Prime Minister later changed his mind and said that he would use the question of confidence to defend Maraví from impeachment. Following this, Keiko Fujimori, the leader of Popular Force accused Castillo of leading a terrorist government. Subsequently, Maraví announced that he would undertake legal action against Keiko. Later, Justice Minister Aníbal Torres reassured the press that a question of confidence would not be used to defend Maraví. However, PM Bellido said that Torres' statement "is an opinion of the minister," and affirmed that using the question of confidence to defend Maraví wasn't ruled out.

The press reported that Congress planned to wait until 7 October 2021, which was when a reinterpretation of the question of trust came into effect after having been approved on 17 September 2021. The reinterpretation would forbid the Prime Minister from raising the question of trust for constitutional reform bills and for issues that were the exclusive competence of the Congress of the Republic. According to sources consulted, the Congressional would claim that censuring ministers is a competence of the legislature in which the Government cannot intervene.

Previously, Aníbal Torres criticized Congress' move to reinterpret the question of confidence, saying that it violated the balance of power established by the Constitution. Torres has stated that if Congress tries to promulgate the reinterpretation, then the Government will present an action of unconstitutionality. This case would be overseen by the Constitutional Court. It is worth noting that Congress has begun the election of new judges for the Constitutional Court. The mandate for the current Constitutional Court expired in 2019, but they kept serving as Congress couldn't agree on replacements.

The Congressional opposition's attempt to impeach Iber Maraví was abruptly cut by the dissolution of the Bellido cabinet. He was replaced by Betssy Chávez.

==== Resignation of Guido Bellido ====
Citing instability in the country, Pedro Castillo announced that Prime Minister Guido Bellido had resigned during a surprise message in state television. Bellido's status as prime minister was controversial from the start of his tenure. Leaders from the Congressional opposition welcomed Castillo's decision to replace Bellido.

Ministry	Head	Party	Term						
Ministry	Head	Party	Start	End					
Ministry	Head	Party	Start	End	President of the Council of Ministers	Guido Bellido Ugarte	Perú Libre	29 July 2021	6 October 2021
Minister of Foreign Affairs	Héctor Béjar Rivera	Independent	29 July 2021	17 August 2021					
Minister of Foreign Affairs	Óscar Maúrtua de Romaña	Independent	20 August 2021	6 October 2021					
Minister of Defense	Walter Ayala Gonzales	Independent	29 July 2021	6 October 2021					
Minister of Economy and Finance	Pedro Francke Ballvé	New Peru	30 July 2021	6 October 2021					
Minister of the Interior	Juan Carrasco Millones	Together for Peru	29 July 2021	6 October 2021					
Minister of Justice and Human Rights	Aníbal Torres Vásquez	Independent	30 July 2021	6 October 2021					
Minister of Education	Juan Cadillo León	Independent	29 July 2021	6 October 2021					
Minister of Health	Hernando Cevallos Flores	Broad Front	29 July 2021	6 October 2021					
Minister of Agrarian Development and Irrigation	Víctor Maita Frisancho	Broad Front	29 July 2021	6 October 2021					
Minister of Labor and Employment Promotion	Íber Maraví Olarte	Independent	29 July 2021	6 October 2021					
Minister of Production	Yván Quispe Apaza	Broad Front	29 July 2021	6 October 2021					
Minister of Foreign Trade and Tourism	Roberto Sánchez	Together for Peru	29 July 2021	6 October 2021					
Minister of Energy and Mines	Iván Merino Aguirre	Independent	29 July 2021	6 October 2021					
Minister of Transport and Communications	Juan Silva Villegas	Independent	29 July 2021	6 October 2021					
Minister of Housing, Construction, and Sanitation	Geiner Alvarado López	Independent	29 July 2021	6 October 2021					
Minister of Women and Vulnerable Populations	Anahí Durand Guevara	New Peru	29 July 2021	6 October 2021					
Minister of the Environment	Rubén Ramírez Mateo	Perú Libre	29 July 2021	6 October 2021					
Minister of Culture	Ciro Gálvez Herrera	RUNA	29 July 2021	6 October 2021					
Minister of Development and Social Inclusion	Dina Boluarte Zegarra	Independent	29 July 2021	6 October 2021					

=== Vásquez cabinet ===
Vásquez Cabinet
- Cabinet of Peru
- 2021–2022
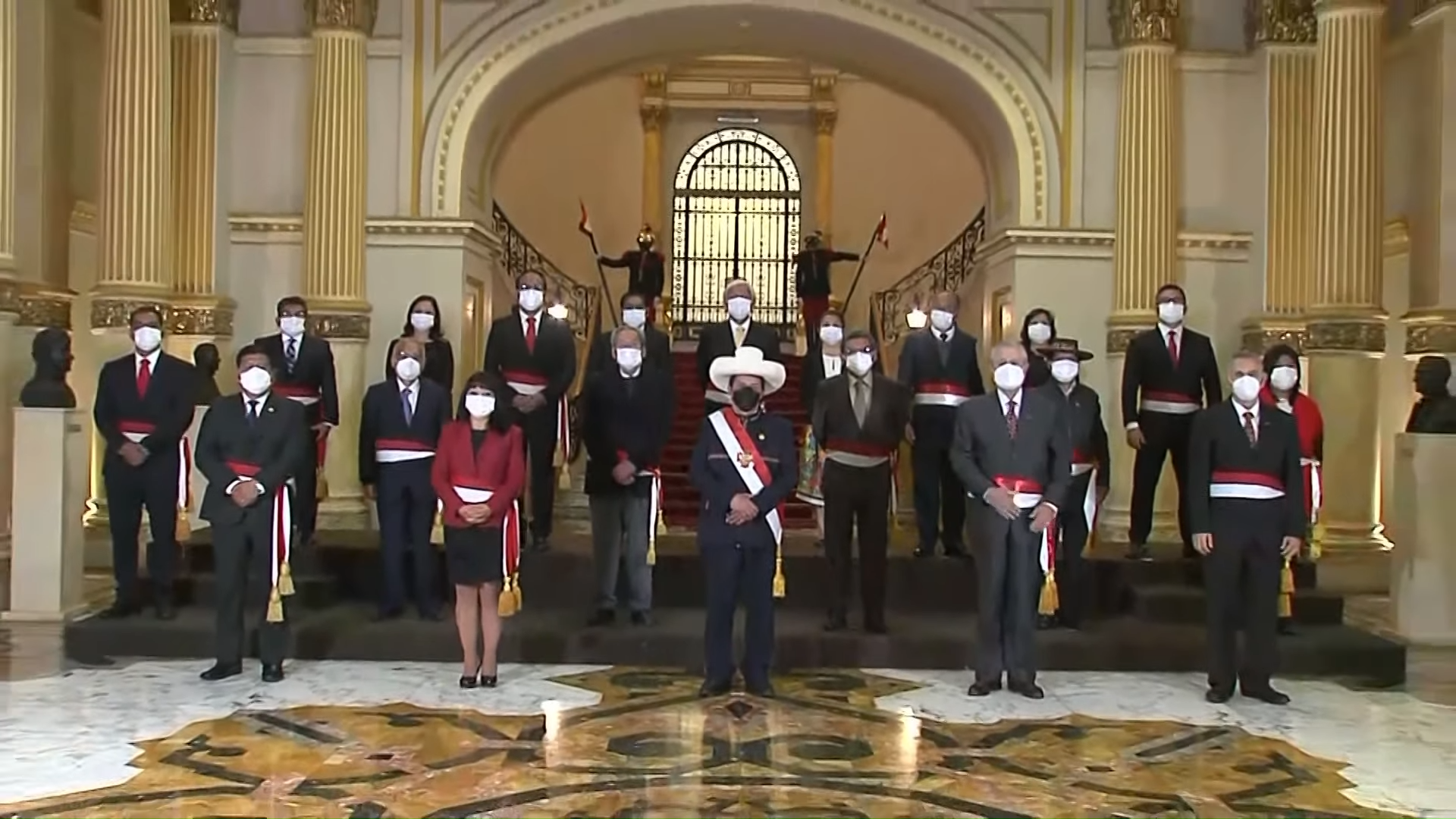
- Cabinet of Mirtha Vásquez
- Date formed: 6 October 2021
- Date dissolved: 1 February 20222

People and organisations
- President of the Republic: Pedro Castillo
- President of the Council of Ministers: Mirtha Vásquez
- No. of ministers: 19
- Member party: Non-partisan (13); Together for Peru (3); Broad Front (3); New Peru (2); Free Peru (1); Popular Action (1)
- Opposition parties: Popular Force; Go on Country; Popular Renewal; Alliance for Progress; We Are Peru
- Opposition leader: Rafael López Aliaga

History
- Legislature term: 2021–2026
- Predecessor: Bedillo Cabinet
- Successor: Valer Cabinet

Mirtha Vásquez was appointed Prime Minister of Peru on 6 October. Vásquez was previously a congresswoman for the Broad Front party.

==== Relations with Free Peru ====
After the new ministers were sworn in, Free Peru's spokesperson Waldemar Cerrón called the new cabinet a betrayal of the majority. He stated that Free Peru will keep fighting for a cabinet that represents all Peruvian people. According to Edgar Tello, a Congressman from Free Peru, his party has agreed to not give confidence to the Vásquez cabinet. Tello also indicated that if Castillo does not respond to Free Peru's request to reevaluate the cabinet, then Free Peru could become part of the opposition. When asked if the party would support impeachment against Castillo, Tello stated that the Free Peru caucus has not made a decision in this regard. However, he noted that he wished that Free Peru wouldn't have to resort to such extremes.

The next day, Free Peru released a statement, in which they stated they will not support the cabinet but ruled out acting to obstruct the Government. Waldemar Cerrón claimed that the party was more united than ever, and that they support President Castillo. That said, a faction of Free Peru came out in support of the new cabinet. Ultimately, 16 of Free Peru's parliamentarians, including former prime minister Guido Bellido, voted against giving confidence to the Vásquez cabinet. 19 of Free Peru's parliamentarians voted to give confidence to the Vásquez cabinet.

On 6 November 2021, Free Peru's Regional Secretary Jorge Spelucín claimed that President Castillo had cut off all communication channels with Free Peru. Spelucín claimed that the President's environment was guiding him towards the political center and right, and that Free Peru wanted to help Castillo return to the left. Former prime minister Guido Bellido also affirmed that Castillo had cut off communication after the resignation of the Bellido cabinet. Bellido also claimed that Castillo's ideological formation "is not from the left," but rather at "the level of a basic trade unionist."

On 20 November 2021, following an impending impeachment motion by the opposition's Go on Country parliamentarian Patricia Chirinos, Edgar Tello assured that Free Peru was united against a presidential impeachment. The Free Peru parliamentarian Silvana Robles called the impeachment motion a coup, and claimed that impeachment was always on the agenda, despite the President of Congress Maricarmen Alva claiming otherwise. Additionally, another Free Peru parliamentarian, Kelly Portalatino, accused Vice President Dina Boluarte of conspiring against Castillo. Previously, Boluarte had distanced herself from Free Peru and tried negotiating with the opposition, including Chirinos. Chirinos denied speaking to Boluarte regarding an impeachment. Boluarte on the other hand also responded by saying that her total loyalty was with the President and the Peruvian people.

On 23 November 2021, the Free Peru parliamentarian Margot Palacios claimed that she would evaluate supporting the impeachment motion against President Castillo. Hours after Palacios' statement, Free Peru's General Secretary Vladimir Cerrón said "When you lose faith in your militancy, you force yourself to look for strength with the mercenaries." Cerron also quoted Borges by saying "traitors are reliable because they never change." Afterward, El Comercio released a paper claiming that the Free Peru caucus voted as a split group nearly 50% of the time.

On 29 November 2021, Vladimir Cerrón announced that Free Peru would hold an extraordinary national assembly on 5 December 2021, to determine the party's stance on the impeachment motion, the government, and other topics.

On 6 December 2021, Free Peru concluded its extraordinary national assembly by announcing that it would vote unanimously against impeachment. Free Peru stated that it has "serious discrepancies" with the "caviar" government of Castillo, but also accused the pro-impeachment movement of being fascist and anti-democratic. Additionally, Free Peru also reaffirmed that it considered Cuba, Venezuela, and Bolivia to have democratic governments.

==== Resignation of Luis Barranzuela ====
Luis Barranzuela, the new Minister of the Interior, was a former police officer and the lawyer of Vladimir Cerrón until his appointment as minister. On 18 October 2021, Congress questioned the new minister over the 158 reprimands he got during his time as a police officer, and his ties to Free Peru. The parties Popular Action and Go on Country warned that they would not give confidence to the Vásquez cabinet if Luis Barranzuela wasn't removed from the cabinet.

Despite pandemic restrictions established by the ministry he presided, Luis Barranzuela hosting a party for the Día de la Canción Criolla on 31 October 2021 at his home located in the district of Surco, in Lima. The party was attended by congressman Guillermo Bermejo, who upon being caught by the cameras of Latina Televisión fled the place in the van of his lawyer Ronald Atencio, who reportedly was another of the guests. Barrenzuela denied having a party and affirmed that it was only a work meeting, declaring that "Peru cannot stop". For his part, Bermejo declared that "the loud music was from an adjoining house". However, neighbors of Barranzuela declared to the local press that a party did take place, that it had started in the afternoon and that due to the discomfort of the loud music they decided to call the police. Interviewed by Perú21, a neighbor told that days before, cars on the streets around the minister's house had been removed, something unusual, which would suggest that the party had been planned.

In the backlash that followed, members of several caucuses called for Barranzuela's resignation. and threatened not to give a vote of confidence to Mirtha Vásquez's cabinet if he remained in office. The Ombudsman's Office issued a statement in its social networks reminding the citizens, and especially those in high positions, that they must comply with sanitary measures to counteract COVID-19 infections. The president of the Congressional Defense Committee, José Williams, informed that Barranzuela had been summoned on 3 November, to answer for the party in his house. The president of the Judicial Power, Elvia Barrios, said that "the law has to be applied equally to all, if there is a sanction, there has to be a sanction, the law is the same for all".

Barranzuela met with President Castillo on the afternoon of 2 November at the Government Palace. He left moments after the arrival of premier Mirtha Vásquez, who a day earlier called his meeting "unacceptable". In the evening, Barranzuela made his resignation official, two days after the party was held, but rejected the accusations against him.

On 4 November 2021, the cabinet received the approval of Congress, with 68 votes in favor, 56 against and one abstention, and Avelino Guillén was sworn in as the new Interior Minister.

==== Resignation of Walter Ayala ====
On 4 November 2021, the General Commander of the Army, José Vizcarra Álvarez, and Jorge Luis Chaparro, the General Commander of the Air Force, were relieved from their duties. Both had served in their positions for 3 months prior to their removal. On 8 November 2021, Vizcarra claimed that President Castillo, Defense Minister Walter Ayala, and presidential secretary Bruno Pacheco had pressured him to irregularly promote two colonels. Vizcarra claimed that his refusal to promote them led to him being removed as General Commander of the Army.

Subsequently, members from the Congressional opposition denounced the alleged irregularities. They began to prepare a motion of interpellation against the Defense Minister, which would allow Congress to question him on the incident. Jorge Montoya, the spokesperson of Popular Renewal, stated that following the interpellations he would impeach Ayala. Afterward, Ayala stated that he was evaluating resigning as Minister of Defense due to "continuous attacks." However, he denied claims that he had interfered with the promotions.

Afterward, several other generals affirmed that the Secretary of the Presidency had interfered with promotions. Chaparro, the former commander of the Air force, claimed that he had been asked on 3 occasions to promote people who did not have the necessary skills. The leader of Free Peru, Vladimir Cerrón, distanced his party from the scandal, saying that Free Peru does not lead the current government. Meanwhile, Prime Minister Mirtha Vásquez gave a statement, saying that the government respects an attitude of non-interference in the Armed Forces. She stated that "serious" facts were revealed, and that a decision would be announced within the next few hours.

On 13 November 2021, Justice Minister Aníbal Torres called on Walter Ayala to resign. Meanwhile, Health Minister Hernando Cevallos stated that Castillo was very annoyed with presidential secretary Bruno Pacheco's behavior, and that he had removed those people who may violate the independence of the armed forces. Additionally, rumors grew that Prime Minister Mirtha Vásquez might resign due to the controversy. In Peruvian law, the resignation of the PM dissolves the entire cabinet. Responding to the rumors, Labor Minister Betssy Chávez said that there was "a lot of speculation" on the matter, but affirmed that the cabinet would work together. Meanwhile, Aníbal Torres downplayed such rumors, saying that he hadn't seen "differences" between Castillo and Vásquez.

On 14 November 2021, Walter Ayala announced his irrevocable resignation. However, the next day, Ayala stated that the resignation would only become effective once Castillo accepted it, and that he would continue working in the meanwhile. Ayala stated that he could not abandon his post since there was no replacement as of then, and accused Congress of not allowing him to work. Later that day, Castillo accepted the resignation of Walter Ayala and thanked him for his services.

On 17 November 2021, Juan Carrasco was sworn in as the new Defense Minister. Carrasco had previously been Castillo's Interior Minister during the Bellido cabinet.

On 19 November, Presidential Secretary Bruno Pacheco resigned. Pacheco claimed to be innocent, and said he was resigning to stop the smear campaign against the president.

==== Controversy over Juan Silva ====
On 3 November 2021, Transportation Minister Juan Silva announced an agreement with transport unions. Prior to the agreement, the transport unions of Lima and Callao had announced plans to strike. The agreement involved the replacement of the president of the Urban Transportation Authority, and the head of the Superintendence of Land Transport of People, Cargo and Goods (Sutran). The new head of the Sutran resigned 6 days later, following the revelation that 3 police complaints had been filed against her for alleged robberies at shopping centers.

On 11 November 2021, Congress voted against interpelling Silva, in part due to Popular Force abstaining. Since Popular Force and its Fujmorist ideology are seen as being staunchly opposed to Castillo, their decision to abstain drew much criticism from anti-Castillo hardliners. Popular Force's spokesperson, Hernando Guerra García, responded to the criticism by saying that the "spotlight" shouldn't be on two things at once, referring to the pressure campaign against the then Defense Minister Walter Ayala and this case. Guerra García said that interpellation would go "minister by minister."

On 18 November 2021, Congress accepted a new motion to interpellate Juan Silva. The motion was proposed by Popular Force.

==== Impeachment attempt ====
On 20 November 2021, Popular Force, Go on Country, and Popular Renewal backed a motion by Patricia Chirinos to impeach President Castillo for "moral incapacity." With the three parties only having 43 votes out of the 87 needed for impeachment, Popular Renewal parliamentarian José Cueto said that he was aware that the motion would fail, but hoped that the motion would get 52 signatures to allow for Congress to summon President Castillo for questioning before Congress. Free Peru's members initially presented contradictory statements on the impeachment. Meanwhile, Together for Peru denounced the impeachment attempt as a "coup maneuver."

On 28 November 2021, Cuarto Poder teased footage of various people entering Castillo's campaign house in Breña. Among these people were Castillo, who entered without his characteristic Chotano hat. As the meetings were unregistered (against Peruvian regulations), many hyped up the Cuarto Poder reports as a prelude to a major corruption expose against Castillo's administration.

On 6 December 2021, Free Peru concluded an extraordinary national assembly by announcing that it would vote unanimously against an impeachment.

On 1 December 2021, Prime Minister Mirtha Vásquez assured that the Breña house and other places outside the Government Palace will no longer be used for meetings and assured that measures would be taken in order to improve transparency. Vásquez also said Castillo would be willing to be transparent regarding the people he met at the Breña house.

That same day, Peru and the OAS signed a joint declaration in favor of democracy and human rights. The OAS leader Luis Almagro said that "We have seen that president Castillo has much determination to fight corruption, especially corruption that may appear in his government. Let his management be as clean as possible. This requires important efforts in investigation. Let there be a permanent monitoring of transparency, of justice, so that there isn't any element of shadow over official members."

On 5 December, Cuarto Poder finally released the audio clip. The audio showed the owner of the Breña house offering "scoops and headlines" to a journalist in exchange for the journalist shelving an unfavorable news story. The host of ATV news, Juliana Oxenford, claimed that it is "much more revealing to know the high content of trans fats in Cheese Tris than the audio of Cuarto Poder." Meanwhile, the journalist Juan Carlos Tafur said that the Cuarto Poder audio "qualifies as a journalistic scam."

Following the release of the Cuarto Poder clips, the impeachment motion rapidly fell apart as less hardline members of the opposition rescinded their support for the impeachment motion. On 7 December 2021, with 46 in favor, 76 against, and 4 abstentions, Congress refused to admit the impeachment motion. Following the defeat of the impeachment motion, President Castillo said: "I am grateful that the congressional voted to put Peru first before other interests."

==== Investigation of Bruno Pacheco ====
On 16 November 2021, leaked chats showed that then presidential secretary Bruno Pacheco attempted to pressure the SUNAT to favor certain companies and individuals.

On 19 November 2021, Bruno Pacheco resigned as presidential secretary due to his role in the Walter Ayala controversy, regarding attempts to irregularly promote military personnel. Pacheco maintained that he was resigning in order to stop the smear campaign against the President. His position was replaced by Carlos Jaico.

On 23 November 2021, the Public Prosecutor's Office found $20,000 in cash inside Pacheco's office bathroom in the Governmental Palace. Pacheco claimed that this money came from his savings and the salary he received.

On 24 November 2021, Alejandro Aguinaga, a Popular Force parliamentarian and president of the Congressional Oversight Commission called on Prime Minister Mirtha Vásquez to indicate what measures would be taken against Pacheco. In response, the Free Peru parliamentarian Guillermo Bermejo accused the Fujimorist Popular Force of double standards and brought up corruption charges against Alberto Fujimori and Vladimiro Montesinos. Meanwhile, the former prime minister Guido Bellido said "It makes me suspicious that someone goes to work with his 20 thousand dollars," and stated that it would be evaluated and taken into account in Free Peru's stance on the impeachment motion. Later, PM Vásquez stated that "We are the foremost interested in this investigation moving forward."

On 6 December 2021, RPP reported that on 26 July 2021, two days before Castillo's inauguration, the minimum requirements for the presidential secretary were removed. Prior to the removal of the requirements, the presidential secretary had to have at least 10 years of experience in the public or private sector and 5 years of experience in directing staff.

On 8 December 2021, the Supreme Court barred Pacheco from leaving the country for 8 months.

==== Removal of Carlos Gallardo Gómez ====
On 21 December 2021, with 70 votes in favor, Congress forced Carlos Gallardo Gómez to resign as Minister of Education. Congress accused Carlos Gallardo Gómez of having ties to the Shining Path and leaking the answers of the 2021 teacher appointment exam. Gómez was replaced with Rosendo Serna.

Ministry	Head	Party	Term						
Ministry	Head	Party	Start	End					
Ministry	Head	Party	Start	End	President of the Council of Ministers	Mirtha Vásquez Chuquilín	Broad Front	6 October 2021	31 January 2022
Minister of Foreign Affairs	Óscar Maúrtua de Romaña	Independent	6 October 2021	1 February 2022					
Minister of Defense	Walter Ayala Gonzales	Independent	6 October 2021	15 November 2021					
Minister of Defense	Juan Carrasco Millions	Together for Peru	17 November 2021	1 February 2022					
Minister of Economy and Finance	Pedro Francke Ballvé	New Peru	6 October 2021	1 February 2022					
Minister of the Interior	Luis Barranzuela Vite	Independent	6 October 2021	2 November 2021					
Minister of the Interior	Avelino Guillén Jáuregui	Independent	4 November 2021	30 January 2022					
Minister of Justice and Human Rights	Aníbal Torres Vásquez	Independent	6 October 2021	1 February 2022					
Minister of Education	Carlos Gallardo Gómez	New Peru	6 October 2021	21 December 2021					
Minister of Education	Rosendo Serna Román	Together for Peru	28 December 2021	1 February 2022					
Minister of Health	Hernando Cevallos Flores	Broad Front	6 October 2021	1 February 2022					
Minister of Agrarian Development and Irrigation	Víctor Maita Frisancho	Broad Front	6 October 2021	1 February 2022					
Minister of Labor and Employment Promotion	Betssy Chávez Chino	Independent	6 October 2021	1 February 2022					
Minister of Production	Roger Incio Sánchez	Popular Action	6 October 2021	17 November 2021					
Minister of Production	Jorge Luis Prado	Independent	17 November 2021	1 February 2022					
Minister of Foreign Trade and Tourism	Roberto Sánchez	Together for Peru	6 October 2021	1 February 2022					
Minister of Energy and Mines	Eduardo González Toro	Independent	6 October 2021	1 February 2022					
Minister of Transport and Communications	Juan Silva Villegas	Independent	6 October 2021	1 February 2022					
Minister of Housing, Construction, and Sanitation	Geiner Alvarado López	Independent	6 October 2021	1 February 2022					
Minister of Women and Vulnerable Populations	Anahí Durand Guevara	New Peru	6 October 2021	1 February 2022					
Minister of the Environment	Rubén Ramírez Mateo	Free Peru	6 October 2021	1 February 2022					
Minister of Culture	Gisela Ortiz Perea	Independent	6 October 2021	1 February 2022					
Minister of Development and Social Inclusion	Dina Boluarte Zegarra	Independent	6 October 2021	1 February 2022					

=== Valer cabinet ===
Valer Cabinet
- Cabinet of Peru
- 2022
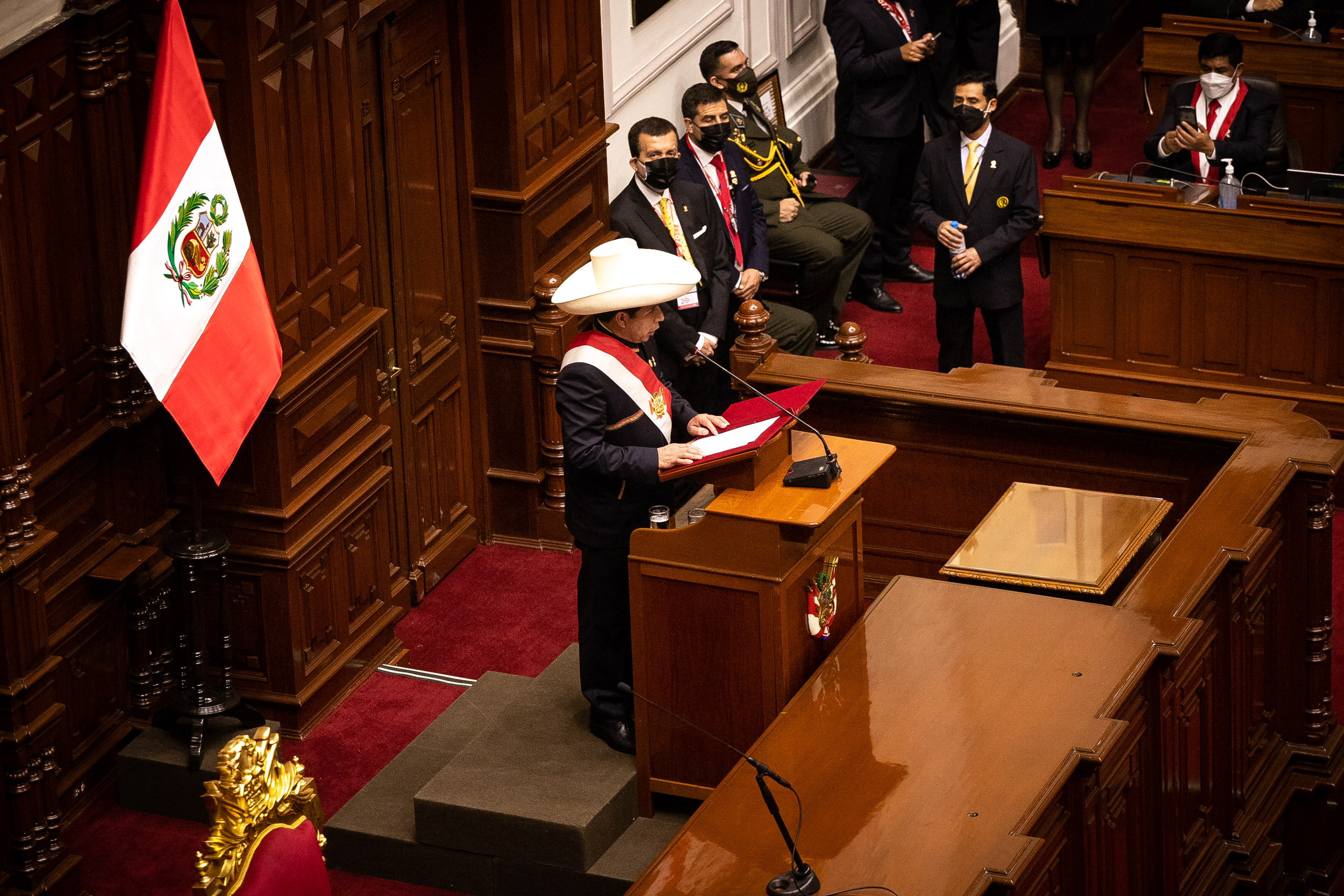
- President Castillo in 2021
- Date formed: 1 February 2022
- Date dissolved: 8 February 2022

People and organisations
- President of the Republic: Pedro Castillo
- President of the Council of Ministers: Héctor Valer
- No. of ministers: 19
- Member party: Non-partisan (14); Free Peru (2); Together for Peru (2); We Are Peru (1)
- Opposition parties: Popular Force; Go on Country; Popular Renewal; Popular Action; Alliance for Progress
- Opposition leader: Rafael López Aliaga

History
- Legislature term: 2021–2026
- Predecessor: Vásquez Cabinet
- Successor: Torres Cabinet

On 1 February 2022, congressman Héctor Valer was appointed to succeed Mirtha Vásquez, who had resigned the previous day after denouncing corruption and a lack of consensus within her cabinet and with Pedro Castillo. Valer was a controversial figure, facing difficulties in his duties due to a 2016 allegation of violence made by his wife and daughter, which he denied.

All parliamentary groups refused to grant him a vote of confidence, including the governing coalition, and two ministers opposed his appointment. Pedro Castillo was forced to react and announced a cabinet reshuffle.

On 5 February 2022, Héctor Valer resigned following the resurfacing of past domestic violence allegations, marking the shortest-lived cabinet since 1980. However, he continued to serve in an interim capacity while the government awaited the appointment of his successor.

==== Context ====
The formation of the third cabinet followed the resignation of Mirtha Vásquez on the eve of 31 January 2022. This occurred the day after the resignation of the Minister of the Interior, who resigned citing a “structural problem of corruption” and the impossibility of creating consensus.

This decision triggered a political crisis, with the previously supportive Purple Party demanding the formation of a capable government or else the resignation of President Pedro Castillo.

The third vice president of the Congress Patricia Chirinos (AvP) announced the filing of a motion of censure against the president, citing the "evident corruption of his government."

==== Appointment ====
Initially, the official presentation of the new cabinet was scheduled for 3:30pm on 1 February 2022, but did not occur at the announced time, prompting the resignation of Minister of Economy Pedro Francke. Subsequently, President Castillo postponed the announcement to 5:00 p.m. and adds to the announcement the appointment of the entire new cabinet, before postponing it for a second time to 5:30 p.m. Héctor Valer was appointed President of the council and took the oath of office alongside his cabinet.

==== Reactions and political crisis ====
However, rather than address concerns, Héctor Valer's nomination amplified the political crisis. On 3 February 2022, it was revealed that Valer had been the subject of two complaints of violence by his wife and daughter in 2016, over which a court had granted him protection in 2017. In a press conference, Valer denied the allegations alleging lack of evidence or convictions, and defended himself by saying he had only "reprimanded" his daughter without violence.

Later the same night, all parliamentary groups (i.e., FP, AP, AvP, RP and PP, except SP whose group is divided between support and distrust) officially condemned the acts committed and announced that they would not grant a vote of confidence to the Valer. The following day, 4 February 2022, the ruling party Free Peru decided after not to grant a vote of confidence to Valer. A few hours later, the four members of the Together for Peru group, with the exception of the minister and deputy Roberto Sánchez, also decided not to grant the vote of confidence.

Despite the extent of the political crisis, Héctor Valer announced at 11:00am on 4 February 2022 that he would attend Congress the following day to request a vote of confidence. In reaction, the President of Congress Maricarmen Alva rejected the possibility of a vote of confidence the following day.

==== Speech by Pedro Castillo ====
Against the backdrop of the ongoing political crisis, with parliamentary groups refusing to grant confidence to the government and even loyal ministers Roberto Sánchez and Hernando Cevallos expressing dissatisfaction, President Pedro Castillo gave a speech at 6:00 p.m. on 4 February 2022. In it, he announced a cabinet reshuffle and reorganization, without specifying whether he intends to replace the president of the council. At the time of the speech, a demonstration was taking place in front of the Government Palace demanding the resignation of Héctor Valer and against the appointment of the Minister of Women Katy Ugarte, who had spoken out against education in gender history and LGBT, in April 2021.

==== Resignation ====
Following Pedro Castillo's announcement of a cabinet reshuffle, Prime Minister Héctor Valer submitted his resignation on 5 February 2022 during a press conference in front of the ministry building. and stated that he would return to his parliamentary duties. His government was the shortest-term cabinet to exist in Peru since 1980.

Ministry	Head	Party	Term						
Ministry	Head	Party	Start	End					
Ministry	Head	Party	Start	End	President of the Council of Ministers	Héctor Valer Pinto	Independent	1 February 2022	8 February 2022
Minister of Foreign Affairs	César Landa Arroyo	Independent	1 February 2022	8 February 2022					
Minister of Defense	José Luis Gavidia	Independent	1 February 2022	8 February 2022					
Minister of Economy and Finance	Oscar Graham Yamahuchi	Independent	1 February 2022	8 February 2022					
Minister of the Interior	Alfonso Chávarry Estrada	Independent	1 February 2022	8 February 2022					
Minister of Justice and Human Rights	Aníbal Torres Vásquez	Independent	1 February 2022	8 February 2022					
Minister of Education	Rosendo Serna Román	Together for Peru	1 February 2022	8 February 2022					
Minister of Health	Hernando Cevallos Flores	Independent	1 February 2022	8 February 2022					
Minister of Agrarian Development and Irrigation	Alberto Ramos Quilca	Independent	1 February 2022	8 February 2022					
Minister of Labor and Employment Promotion	Betssy Chávez Chino	Independent	1 February 2022	8 February 2022					
Minister of Production	Jorge Luis Prado	Independent	1 February 2022	8 February 2022					
Minister of Foreign Trade and Tourism	Roberto Sánchez	Together for Peru	1 February 2022	8 February 2022					
Minister of Energy and Mines	Alessandra Herrera Jara	Independent	1 February 2022	8 February 2022					
Minister of Transport and Communications	Juan Silva Villegas	Independent	1 February 2022	8 February 2022					
Minister of Housing, Construction, and Sanitation	Geiner Alvarado López	Independent	1 February 2022	8 February 2022					
Minister of Women and Vulnerable Populations	Katy Ugarte Mamani	Free Peru	1 February 2022	8 February 2022					
Minister of the Environment	Wilber Supo Quisocala	Free Peru	1 February 2022	8 February 2022					
Minister of Culture	Alejandro Salas Zegarra	We are Peru	1 February 2022	8 February 2022					
Minister of Development and Social Inclusion	Dina Boluarte Zegarra	Independent	1 February 2022	8 February 2022					

=== Torres cabinet ===
Torres Cabinet
- Cabinet of Peru
- 2022
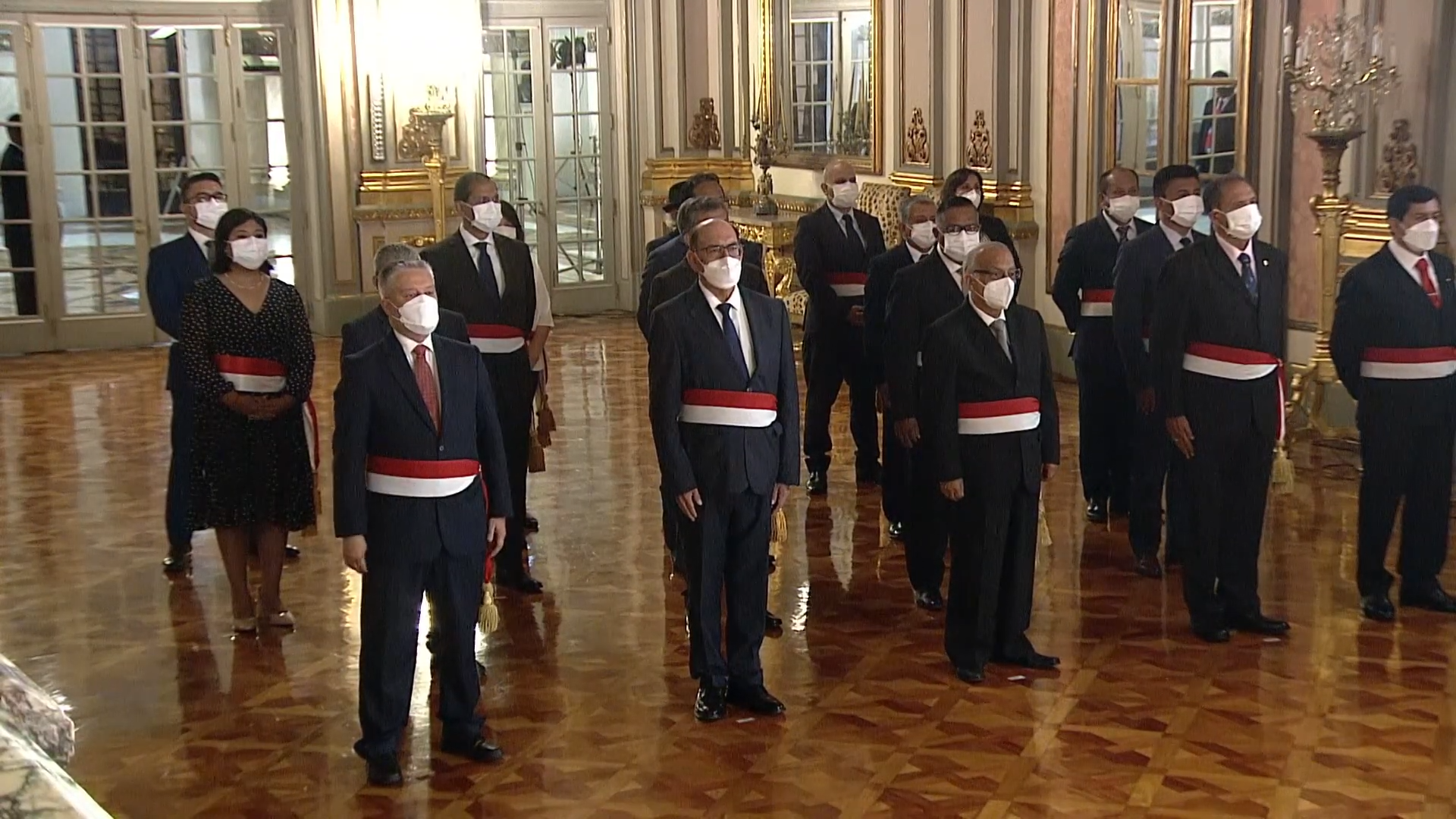
- Cabinet of Aníbal Torres
- Date formed: 8 February 2022
- Date dissolved: 25 November 2022

People and organisations
- President of the Republic: Pedro Castillo
- President of the Council of Ministers: Aníbal Torres
- No. of ministers: 19
- Member party: Non-partisan (34); Free Peru (4); Together for Peru (2); We Are Peru (2); Democratic Peru (1)
- Opposition parties: Popular Force; Go on Country; Popular Renewal; Popular Action; Alliance for Progress
- Opposition leader: Rafael López Aliaga

History
- Legislature term: 2021–2026
- Predecessor: Valer Cabinet
- Successor: Chávez Cabinet

On 8 February 2022, Aníbal Torres was appointed as Prime Minister of Peru. Torres had previously served as the Minister of Justice. The appointment of President Pedro Castillo's fourth cabinet came in the context of an attempt to resolve a political crisis.

==== Resignation of Juan Silva Villegas ====
On 24 February 2022, a motion of censure against the Minister of Transportation, Juan Silva Villegas, was signed by 33 parliamentarians and filed in the Congress of the Republic. This was created at the initiative of the Popular Force group, and also signed by other center-right or right-wing opposition groups such as Popular Renewal, Avanza País, Alliance for Progress and We Are Peru.

The motion of censure refers to the appointment of the minister without him having "the necessary capacity and aptitude to perform the duties, nor having any type of experience, education, or training in public administration, much less in the area of transportation and communications." The parliamentarians emphasized that the Minister's management and performance had "an incalculable number of errors and illegalities." The desire to create a network and numerous acts of corruption are underscored by a report by the Comptroller General of the Republic, Nelson Shack, and the resigning Deputy Minister Fabiola Caballero.

On 1 March 2022, a debate took place in Congress regarding the motion of censure. It began at 8 p.m. and was suspended two hours later around 10 p.m. with Pedro Castillo's announcement on Twitter of the resignation of his minister Juan Silva Villegas.

On 5 March 2022, a few days after Juan Silva Villegas' resignation, President Castillo decided to appoint Minister of Transport and Communications to Nicolás Bustamante, who was sworn in that same night.

==== Dismissal of Hernán Condori ====
On 31 March 2022, a motion of censure against the Minister of Health Hernán Condori was debated in the plenary session of the Congress of the Republic. At the end of the debate, the minister was censured with 71 votes in favor, 32 against, and 13 abstentions. This is due to Minister Condori's mismanagement of the COVID-19 crisis and various controversies surrounding his professional past.

On 7 April 2022, Jorge López Peña, until then Condori's deputy minister, took office as Minister of Health.

==== Redesign in May 2022 ====
On 23 May 2022, amid the accumulation of several motions of censure by the Congress against some ministers with controversial performance, President Castillo decided on a reshuffle of his fourth administration in the portfolios of the Interior, Transportation, Agrarian Development, and Energy and Mines.

Three of the new ministers (Interior, Transport, Energy, and Mines) are independent and have a track record tied to their professional experience. Meanwhile, in Agrarian Development, a member of Perú Libre remains, but without experience.

==== Motion of censure against Betssy Chávez ====
On 26 May 2022, minister of labour Betssy Chávez was censured by the Congress of the Republic with 71 votes in favor, 28 against, and 12 abstentions. The opposition groups Fuerza Popular, RP, Avanza País, and APP motivated the censure by mentioning poor management of the ministry's actions and an air traffic controller strike in April 2022.

During a previous motion for interpellation and convening of the minister on 12 May 2022, Betssy Chávez had answered questions from elected officials about this same strike. The minister's answers, according to right-wing parliamentarians, were not satisfactory. According to the minister, she was further censured for projects not mentioned on 12 May such as the reform of the draft Labor Code.

This decision to censure the Minister of Labor comes in a context of tensions between Pedro Castillo and Perú Libre, with the appointment of four new independent ministers in May 2022. The day before the vote the motion of censure, Waldemar Cerrón met with Pedro Castillo at the Government Palace, referring to a “conversation with the president as allies, not colleagues,” hardening his tone toward the president.

On 30 May 2022, Pedro Castillo decided to appoint Juan Lira Loayza as to replace Chávez.

==== Resignation of Javier Arce ====
On 22 May 2022, Javier Arce Alvarado is appointed Minister of Agrarian Development and Irrigation. On 5 June 2022, after two weeks as minister, Arce announced his resignation due to the lack of mention in his affidavit of his prison sentence for the alleged crime of usurpation of office and other ongoing investigations. President Castillo accepted the position the same day.

==== Resignation rejected by Aníbal Torres ====
On 3 August 2022, Aníbal Torres announces and submits his resignation as President of the Council of Ministers to President Castillo, citing in particular the desire to resume his academic and university life. This resignation came in a context of strong disapproval, with 66% of Peruvians surveyed by Ipsos Peru wanting Torres to resign.

On 5 August 2022, Pedro Castillo announced that he would reject it, preferring to carry out a cabinet reshuffle.

On 24 August 2022, a few days after the announcement of the resignation of Minister José Luis Gavidia, Pedro Castillo appointed a new Minister of Defense and new appointments for the ministries of the Environment and for Women and Vulnerable Populations.

==== Redesign of September 2022 ====
On 10 September 2022, Miguel Rodríguez Mackay resigned as Minister of Foreign Affairs. After a month as minister, the main disagreement was notably with President Castillo over the recognition and reestablishment of diplomatic ties with the Sahrawi Arab Democratic Republic, which Castillo reestablished two days earlier, on 8 September 2022.

President Castillo was forced to reshuffle his government as a result and opted to bring former minister César Landa back to the Ministry of Foreign Affairs on 13 September.

On 24 September 2022, Castillo reshuffled two portfolios, in particular that of the Ministry of Transportation due to Congress's censure of Minister Geiner Alvarado.

==== Redesign of October 2022 ====
On 27 October 2022, following the dismissal of Health Minister Jorge López Peña by Pedro Castillo on 23 October 2022 after accusations of embezzlement, the portfolio was reorganized. The president appointed Kelly Portalatino to fill the vacancy — Portalantino's position as a deputy from Perú Libre marked the party's return to government since the ruptures of May 2022.

==== Resignation of Aníbal Torres ====
Aníbal Torres finally resigned on 24 November 2022 when the Congress refused to hold a vote of confidence.

Ministry	Head	Party	Term						
Ministry	Head	Party	Start	End					
Ministry	Head	Party	Start	End	President of the Council of Ministers	Aníbal Torres Vásquez	Independent	8 February 2022	24 November 2022
Minister of Foreign Affairs	César Landa Arroyo	Independent	8 February 2022	5 August 2022					
Minister of Foreign Affairs	Miguel Rodríguez Mackay	Independent	5 August 2022	9 September 2022					
Minister of Foreign Affairs	César Landa Arroyo	Independent	13 September 2022	24 November 2022					
Minister of Defense	José Luis Gavidia	Independent	8 February 2022	17 August 2022					
Minister of Defense	Richard Tineo Quispe	Independent	24 August 2022	24 September 2022					
Minister of Defense	Daniel Barragán Coloma	Independent	24 September 2022	25 November 2022					
Minister of Economy and Finance	Oscar Graham Yamahuchi	Independent	8 February 2022	5 August 2022					
Minister of Economy and Finance	Kurt Burneo Farfán	Independent	5 August 2022	25 November 2022					
Minister of the Interior	Alfonso Chávarry Estrada	Independent	8 February 2022	22 May 2022					
Minister of the Interior	Dimitri Senmache Artola	Independent	22 May 2022	2 July 2022					
Minister of the Interior	Mariano González Fernández	Independent	4 July 2022	19 July 2022					
Minister of the Interior	Willy Huerta Olivas	Independent	19 July 2022	25 November 2022					
Minister of Justice and Human Rights	Ángel Yldefonso Narro	Independent	8 February 2022	4 March 2022					
Minister of Justice and Human Rights	Félix Chero Medina	Independent	March 4, 2022	25 November 2022					
Minister of Education	Rosendo Serna Román	Together for Peru	8 February 2022	25 November 2022					
Minister of Health	Hernán Condori Machado	Free Peru	8 February 2022	3 April 2022					
Minister of Health	Jorge López Peña	Independent	7 April 2022	27 October 2022					
Minister of Health	Kelly Portalatino Ávalos	Free Peru	27 October 2022	25 November 2022					
Minister of Agrarian Development and Irrigation	Óscar Zea Choquechambi	Independent	8 February 2022	22 May 2022					
Minister of Agrarian Development and Irrigation	Javier Arce Alvarado	Free Peru	22 May 2022	5 June 2022					
Minister of Agrarian Development and Irrigation	Andrés Alencastre Calderón	Independent	6 June 2022	13 September 2022					
Minister of Agrarian Development and Irrigation	Jenny Ocampo Escalante	Independent	13 September 2022	25 November 2022					
Minister of Labor and Employment Promotion	Betssy Chávez Chino	Independent	8 February 2022	26 May 2022					
Minister of Labor and Employment Promotion	Juan Lira Loayza	Independent	29 May 2022	5 August 2022					
Minister of Labor and Employment Promotion	Alejandro Salas Zegarra	We Are Peru	5 August 2022	25 November 2022					
Minister of Production	Jorge Luis Prado	Independent	8 February 2022	25 November 2022					
Minister of Foreign Trade and Tourism	Roberto Sánchez	Together for Peru	8 February 2022	25 November 2022					
Minister of Energy and Mines	Carlos Palacios Pérez	Free Peru	8 February 2022	22 May 2022					
Minister of Energy and Mines	Alessandra Herrera Jara	Independent	22 May 2022	25 November 2022					
Minister of Transport and Communications	Juan Silva Villegas	Independent	8 February 2022	28 February 2022					
Minister of Transport and Communications	Nicolás Bustamante Coronado	Independent	4 March 2022	22 May 2022					
Minister of Transport and Communications	Juan Barranzuela Quiroga	Independent	22 May 2022	5 August 2022					
Minister of Transport and Communications	Geiner Alvarado López	Independent	5 August 2022	16 September 2022					
Minister of Transport and Communications	Richard Tineo Quispe	Independent	24 September 2022	25 November 2022					
Minister of Housing, Construction, and Sanitation	Geiner Alvarado López	Independent	8 February 2022	5 August 2022					
Minister of Housing, Construction, and Sanitation	César Paniagua Chacón	Independent	5 August 2022	25 November 2022					
Minister of Women and Vulnerable Populations	Diana Miloslavich Túpac	Independent	8 February 2022	24 August 2022					
Minister of Women and Vulnerable Populations	Claudia Dávila Moscoso	Independent	August 24, 2022	24 November 2022					
Minister of the Environment	Modesto Montoya Zavaleta	Independent	8 February 2022	24 August 2022					
Minister of the Environment	Wilbert Rozas Beltrán	Broad Front	August 24, 2022	25 November 2022					
Minister of Culture	Alejandro Salas Zegarra	We Are Peru	8 February 2022	5 August 2022					
Minister of Culture	Betssy Chávez Chino	Democratic Peru	5 August 2022	25 November 2022					
Minister of Development and Social Inclusion	Dina Boluarte Zegarra	Independent	8 February 2022	25 November 2022					

=== Chávez cabinet ===
Chávez Cabinet
- Cabinet of Peru
- 2022
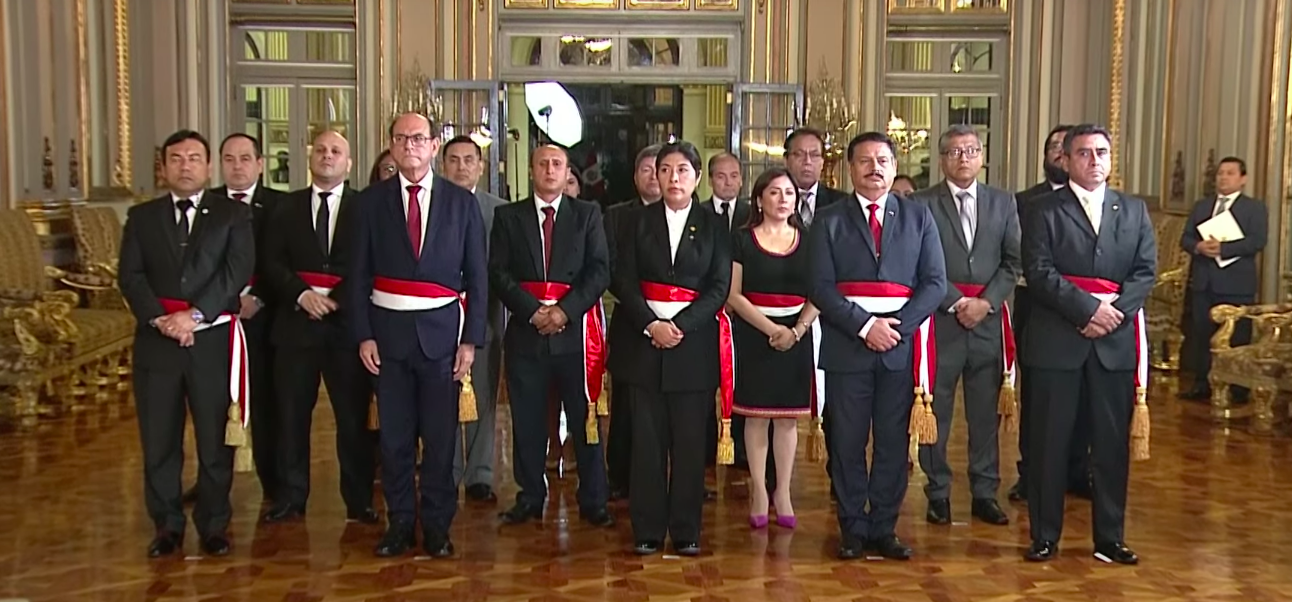
- Cabinet of Betssy Chávez
- Date formed: 25 November 2022
- Date dissolved: 7 December 2022

People and organisations
- President of the Republic: Pedro Castillo
- President of the Council of Ministers: Betssy Chávez
- No. of ministers: 19
- Member party: Non-partisan (15); Free Peru (2); Together for Peru (2)
- Opposition parties: Popular Force; Go on Country; Popular Renewal; Popular Action; Alliance for Progress; We Are Peru
- Opposition leader: Rafael López Aliaga

History
- Legislature term: 2021–2026
- Predecessor: Torres Cabinet
- Successor: Angulo Cabinet

On 26 November 2022, Betssy Chávez was appointed as Prime Minister of Peru. Cháves had previously served as the Culture and Labor Minister.

==== Context ====
The announcement of the new cabinet is an attempt to resolve a political crisis between Pedro Castillo and the Congress of the Republic. On 24 November 2022, President Castillo delivered a speech to the nation in which he announced that he accepted the resignation of Aníbal Torres and also the appointment of a new cabinet.

The resigning Prime Minister wanted to provoke a vote of confidence in Congress so that it would analyze a constitutional reform project to annul Congress in order to trigger referendums, particularly on the Constituent Assembly, a historic project of Castillo's, but the vote of confidence was denied by the presidency of Congress, dominated by the centre-right and the right.

In that same speech, Pedro Castillo evokes the interpretation of Congress's decision not to allow the vote of confidence desired by the President of the council as an "express refusal of confidence" and considers this cabinet change legitimate.

==== Appointment ====
On 25 November 2022, the day after Pedro Castillo's speech, the latter decided to appoint the Minister of Culture Betssy Chávez as President of the Council of Ministers of Peru.

On the same day, the President and the President of the council announced the formation and composition of the Cabinet, the fifth of Castillo's presidency in one year and three months of office.

==== Changes in the Government ====
In the fourth cabinet, of the nineteen appointed ministers, thirteen are re-elected to their positions and six are new ministers, highlighting Heidy Juárez, Silvana Robles, and Cinthya Lindo Espinoza.

Following the announcement by Vice President Dina Boluarte that she will not continue as minister, justifying that "the current polarization harms everyone" and preferring to consolidate "the broadest unity of all Peruvians" as vice president, Minister Roberto Sánchez is the longest-serving minister of Pedro Castillo's mandate, since the first cabinet of Guido Bellido. Since November, he has been described by the media as close to the president and is also implicated in the corruption scandals against Pedro Castillo.

What is surprising is the appointment of Heidy Juárez as Minister of Women and Vulnerable Populations, she is also a representative and former member of APP, expelled from the group and left for being the author and revealing, according to the APP party, the matter of the audio recordings that caused Lady Camones to be censored from the presidency of Congress by the left and center groups. Following this expulsion, he became a member of the Podemos Perú parliamentary group.

However, when she was appointed to the government, she was still a member of the Podemos Perú parliamentary group, but the latter, through the group's president, José Luna Gálvez, expressed its disagreement with this choice, stating that it did not support or was linked to the government. The day after her nomination, on 26 November 2022, she resigned from the group, remaining unregistered in Congress.

Ministry	Head	Party	Term						
Ministry	Head	Party	Start	End					
Ministry	Head	Party	Start	End	President of the Council of Ministers	Betssy Chávez Chino	Democratic Peru	25 November 2022	7 December 2022
Minister of Foreign Affairs	César Landa Arroyo	Independent	25 November 2022	7 December 2022					
Minister of Defense	Daniel Barragán Coloma	Independent	25 November 2022	3 December 2022					
Minister of Defense	Emilio Gustavo Bobbio	Independent	5 December 2022	7 December 2022					
Minister of Economy and Finance	Pedro Francke Ballvé	New Peru	30 July 2021	6 October 2021					
Minister of Economy and Finance	Kurt Burneo Farfán	Independent	25 November 2022	7 December 2022					
Minister of the Interior	Willy Huerta Olivas	Independent	25 November 2022	7 December 2022					
Minister of Justice and Human Rights	Félix Chero Medina	Independent	25 November 2022	7 December 2022					
Minister of Education	Rosendo Serna Román	Together for Peru	25 November 2022	7 December 2022					
Minister of Health	Kelly Portalatino Ávalos	Free Peru	25 November 2022	7 December 2022					
Minister of Agrarian Development and Irrigation	Juan Altamirano Quispe	Independent	25 November 2022	7 December 2022					
Minister of Labor and Employment Promotion	Alejandro Salas Zegarra	Somos Perú	25 November 2022	7 December 2022					
Minister of Production	Eduardo Mora Asnarán	Independent	25 November 2022	7 December 2022					
Minister of Foreign Trade and Tourism	Roberto Sánchez	Together for Peru	25 November 2022	7 December 2022					
Minister of Energy and Mines	Oliverio Muñoz Cabrera	Independent	25 November 2022	7 December 2022					
Minister of Transport and Communications	Richard Tineo Quispe	Independent	25 November 2022	7 December 2022					
Minister of Housing, Construction, and Sanitation	César Paniagua Chacón	Independent	25 November 2022	7 December 2022					
Minister of Women and Vulnerable Populations	Heidy Juárez Calle	Independent	25 November 2022	7 December 2022					
Minister of the Environment	Wilbert Rozas Beltrán	Broad Front	25 November 2022	7 December 2022					
Minister of Culture	Silvana Robles Araujo	Free Peru	25 November 2022	7 December 2022					
Minister of Development and Social Inclusion	Cinthya Lindo Espinoza	Free Peru	25 November 2022	7 December 2022					

== Opinion polls ==
=== Presidential approval ratings ===
Pollster/Medium	Date	Approve	Disapprove	Uncertain	Difference
IEP/La República	18-21 Apr, 2022	25	67	8	-42
Ipsos Perú/América	7 Apr, 2022	19	76	5	-57
Datum/Perú 21/Gestión	1-4 Apr, 2022	19	76	5	-57
CPI	21-25 Mar, 2022	23.1	68.4	8.5	-45.3
IEP/La República	21-24 Mar 2022	24	68	8	-44
Ipsos Perú/El Comercio	8 Mar 2022	26	66	8	-40
Datum/Perú 21/Gestión	26 Feb-1 Mar 2022	25	67	8	-42
IEP/La República	21-23 Feb 2022	28	63	9	-35
Ipsos Peru/America	10-11 Feb 2022	25	69	6	-44
Datum/Perú 21/Gestión	28–31 Jan 2022	29	64	7	-35
CPI/Latina	24–28 Jan 2022	23.4	66.9	9.7	-43.5
IEP/La República	24–27 Jan 2022	28.9	61.5	9.7	-32.6
Ipsos Perú/El Comercio	13–14 Jan 2022	33	60	7	-27
IEP/La República	13–16 Dec 2021	28	60	12	-32
Ipsos Perú/El Comercio	9–10 Dec 2021	36	58	6	-22
CPI/Panamericana	7–10 Dec 2021	25.8	62.1	12.1	–36.3
Datum/Perú 21/Gestión	4–7 Dec 2021	32	59	9	-27
IEP/La República	22–25 Nov 2021	25	65	10	-40
Ipsos Peru/El Comercio	11–12 Nov 2021	35	57	8	-22
IEP/La República	25–28 Oct 2021	35	48	17	-13
Datum/Latina	23–26 Oct 2021	40	50	10	-10
Datum/Peru 21/Management	16–19 Oct 2021	40	50	10	-10
Ipsos Perú/El Comercio	14–15 Oct 2021	42	48	10	-6
IEP/La República	20–23 Sep 2021	40	42	18	-2
Datum/Peru 21/Management	12–15 Sep 2021	42	46	12	-4
Ipsos Peru/El Comercio	9–10 Sep 2021	42	46	12	-4
Datum/Lampadia	5–7 Sep 2021	41	46	13	-5
CPI	1–3 Sep 2021	43.5	43.5	13.0	0
IEP/The Republic	16–19 Aug 2021	38	46	16	-12
Ipsos Peru/El Comercio	12–13 Aug 2021	38	45	17	-7
CPI/America	6–8 Aug 2021	40.0	47.7	12.3	-7.7
Datum/Peru 21/Management	2–4 Aug 2021	39	41	20	-2
Ipsos Peru/El Comercio	22–23 Jul 2021	52	41	7	+11
IEP/The Republic	18–21 Jul 2021	53	45	2	+8
Datum/Peru 21/Management	8–10 Jul 2021	40	35	25	+5
Ipsos Peru/El Comercio	24–25 Jun 2021	48	47	5	+1
IEP/The Republic	17–20 Jun 2021	47	49	4	-2

== See also ==
- Anti-Fujimorism
