= Óscar Graham =

Peruvian politician

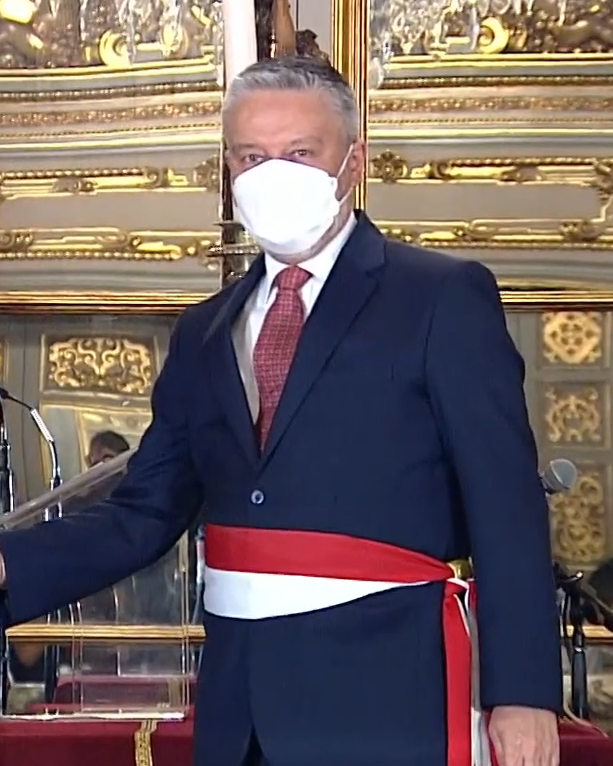

Minister of Economy and Finance
- In office 1 February 2022 – 5 August 2022
- President: Pedro Castillo
- Preceded by: Pedro Francke
- Succeeded by: Kurt Burneo

Personal details
- Born: Óscar Miguel Graham Yamahuchi; 23 December 1962 (age 63) San Martín de Porres, Peru
- Occupation: Politician

Óscar Miguel Graham Yamahuchi (born in San Martín de Porres, Lima, on 23 December 1962) is a Peruvian economist engineer. He served as the second minister of Economy and Finance in the presidency of Pedro Castillo.

== Biography ==
He was born in San Martín de Porres in 1962. He studied Economic Engineering at UNI, has a Master of Science in Economics from Queen Mary University of London and has completed two programs: one at the USIL Postgraduate School in the High Specialization in Finance and another at Harvard Business School in the Strategic Leadership Program in Inclusive Finance. In addition, he worked as a professor of Markets and Financial Institutions at USIL and a professor of the Finance master's program at ESAN.

For most of his life, he worked in the public sector in the economics division of the various sectors where he worked. He worked at the MEF, the SMV, the FSD, EsSalud and the BCRP as head of the Financial System Analysis and Capital Market Analysis and Financial Regulation departments. In addition to teaching at universities about finance specialties. He was an employee of the Electricity Company of Peru (ELCTRPR SA). Before becoming a minister, he worked as general director of Private Financial and Social Security Markets at the MEF. He works at the IFAD.

In 2019 he was deputy minister of Mype and Industry, of the Ministry of Production (Produce), replacing Javier Enrique Dávila Quevedo, during the government of the then president, Martín Vizcarra.

=== Minister of Economy and Finance ===
On 1 February 2022, he was sworn in as Minister of Economy and Finance before Peruvian President Pedro Castillo, replacing Pedro Francke.

He ultimately lasted only six months in office, being succeeded by Kurt Burneo as part of a cabinet reshuffle.
