= Walter Ayala =

Peruvian judge and politician

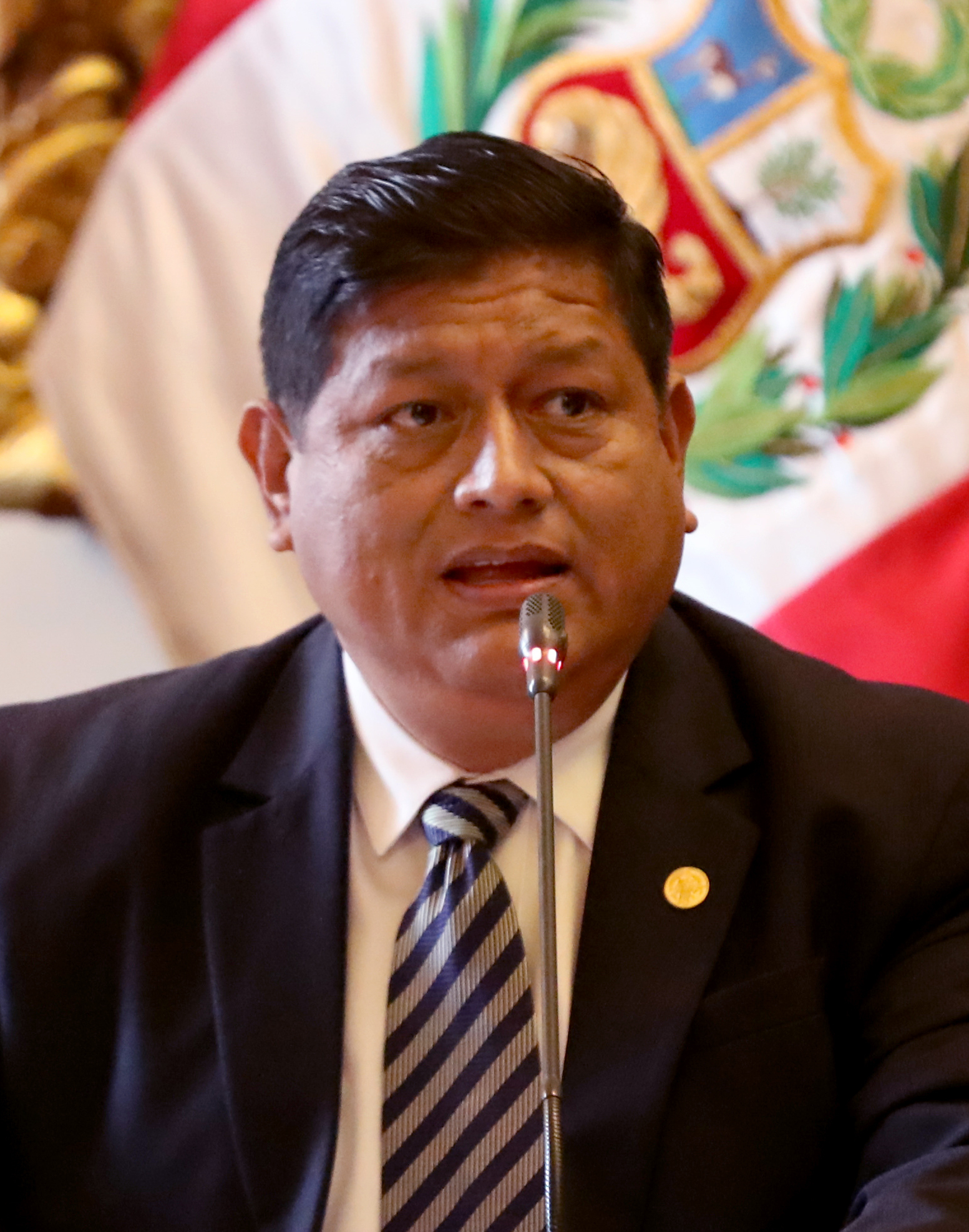

Minister of Defense
- In office 29 July 2021 – 15 November 2021
- President: Pedro Castillo
- Prime Minister: Guido Bellido; Mirtha Vásquez
- Preceded by: Nuria Esparch
- Succeeded by: Juan Carrasco

Personal details
- Born: Walter Ayala Gonzales; 20 July 1971 (age 55) Lima, Peru
- Party: Independent
- Education: Inca Garcilaso de la Vega University; Federico Villarreal National University
- Profession: Judge

Walter Ayala Gonzales (born 20 July 1971) is a Peruvian judge and former Minister of Defense of Peru.

== Career ==
Ayala was born in Lima. He studied at the Inca Garcilaso de la Vega University where he obtained a master's degree, and at the Federico Villarreal University, where he obtained a master's degree in Civil and Commercial Law, as well as studies in Public Administration and Management with a mention in National Defense.

Ayala worked in the judiciary until 2017 and was also chairman of the ethics committee of the Bar Association of Lima before he was removed from office in 2019.

== Defense Minister ==
On 29 July 2021, Ayala was appointed Minister of Defense of Peru in the Pedro Castillo government.
