= Nuria Esparch =

Peruvian lawyer and politician

Nuria del Rocío Esparch Fernández
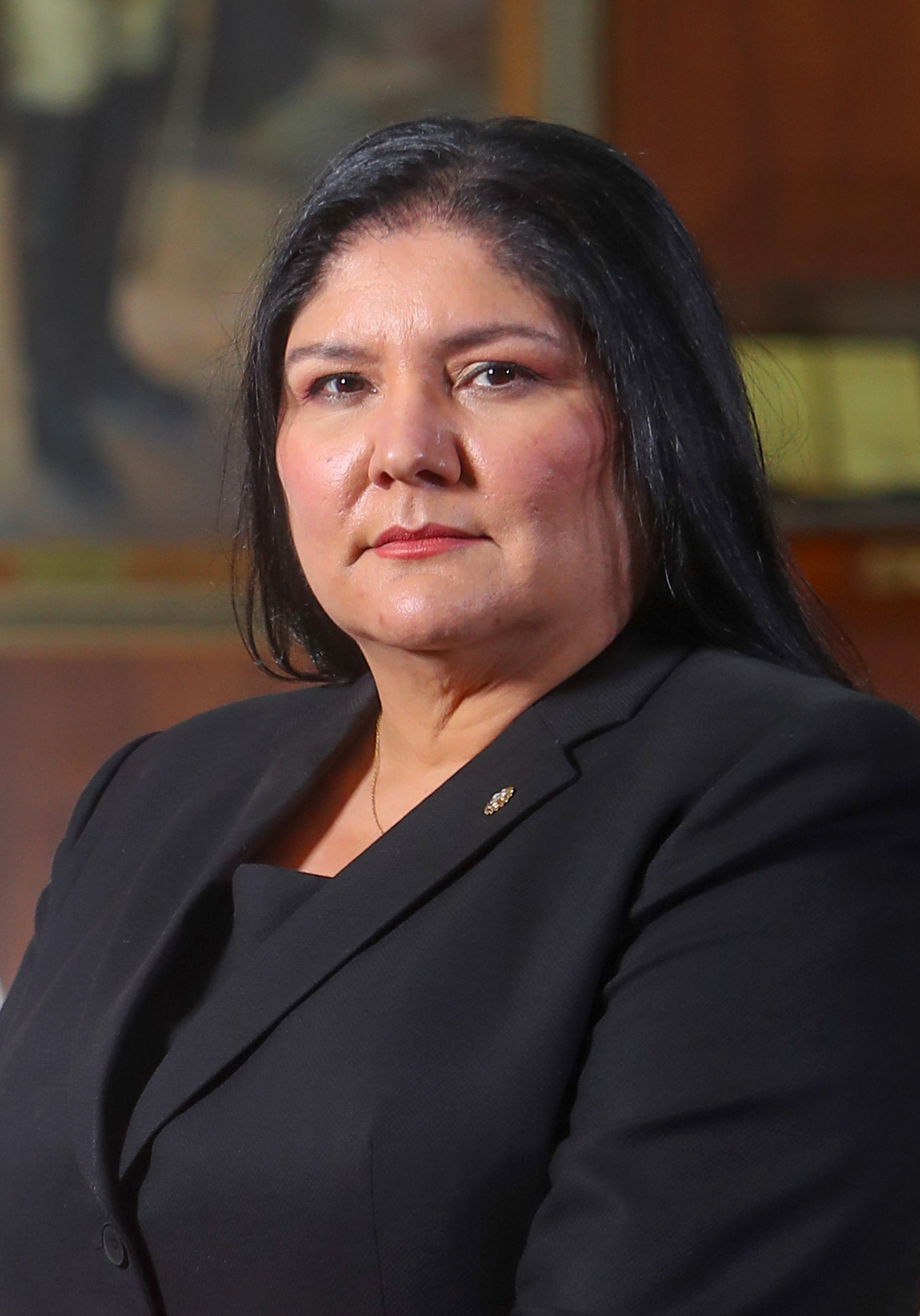

Minister of Defense
- In office 18 November 2020 – 29 July 2021
- President: Francisco Sagasti
- Prime Minister: Violeta Bermúdez
- Preceded by: Walter Chavez
- Succeeded by: Walter Ayala

Personal details
- Born: 19 January 1969 (age 57)
- Education: Pontifical Catholic University of Peru; Syracuse University
- Profession: Lawyer

Nuria del Rocío Esparch Fernández (born 19 January 1969) is a Peruvian lawyer and politician who had served as the country's Defence Minister from November 2020 to July 2021.

== Early life and education ==
Esparch was born in Lima on 19 January 1969. At the age of 14, Esparch was denied admission to a naval school, as "no room for women in the navy". She studied law at the Pontifical Catholic University of Peru. She graduated from the Maxwell School of Citizenship and Public Affairs at Syracuse University with a Master of Public Administration in 2000.

== Career ==
Esparch joined the public service in 1997. She was general Secretary in the ministries of Agriculture and Labor from 2001 until 2005, and served an advisor to the Vice Ministry of the Interior from 2003–2004.

She was appointed Deputy Minister of Administrative and Economic Affairs by President Alan García in 2006. From 2008 until February 2011, she was Executive President of the National Civil Service Authority (SERVIR).

From 2014 until 2018, Esparch was Manager of Institutional Relations for construction company Graña y Montero.

Esparch was appointed defence minister by interim president Francisco Sagasti on 18 November 2020, the first woman to hold the position. Later that month, she reported that 10,000 members of the country's Armed Forces were being trained to deliver COVID-19 vaccines as soon as they become available.

== Awards and honors ==
Esparch has been given the highest civilian distinctions from the Armed Forces of Peru.

In 2021, Esparch was selected to become a member of the US National Academy of Public Administration.
