= Avelino Guillén =

Peruvian lawyer and politician

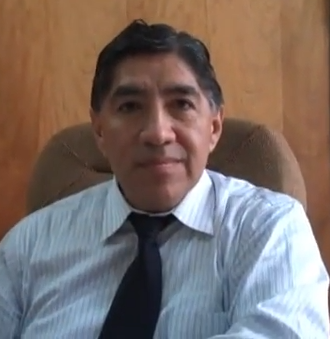

Minister of the Interior
- In office 4 November 2021 – 1 February 2022
- President: Pedro Castillo
- Prime Minister: Mirtha Vásquez
- Preceded by: Luis Barranzuela
- Succeeded by: Alfonso Chávarry

Personal details
- Born: Avelino Trifón Guillén Jáuregui; 10 November 1954 (age 71) Chincheros, Peru
- Education: University of San Martín de Porres
- Profession: Lawyer, judge

Avelino Trifón Guillén Jáuregui (born 10 November 1954) is a Peruvian lawyer and politician. Since 4 November 2021, he has been Minister of the Interior of Peru in the Pedro Castillo government.
