= Price band =

A price band is a policy instrument that serves to insulate domestic producers and processors when the world price for a commodity falls below a calculated reference price (e.g., a price target comparable to a commodity support level). Protection is provided by imposing a variable import levy on the imported commodity that raises the importer's cost to the reference price. Chile, some Andean Group countries, and some Central American countries use price bands to protect specific commodity and processed food sectors.

== Related to pricing ==
In the field of price management a Price Band is a Histogram in which prices of goods and services are grouped into bands. The value of each band is generally either the frequency of occurrences in the sample set within that price band, or the percentage of total volume/revenue contributed by that price band. The Price Band provides a Frequency distribution measuring the ranges at which goods or services were sold.
