= José Luis Gavidia =

Peruvian politician

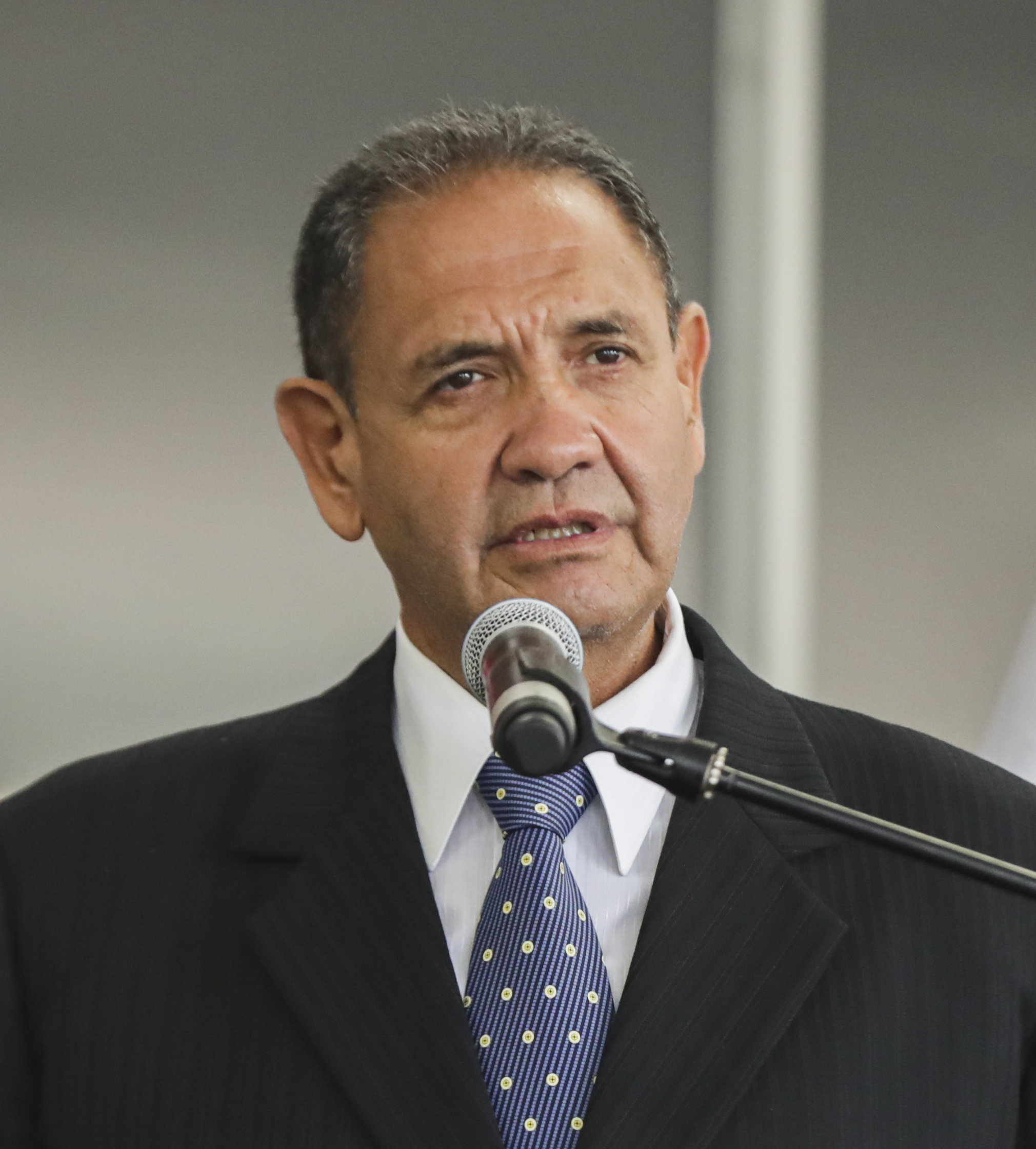

Minister of Defense
- In office 1 February 2022 – 24 August 2022
- President: Pedro Castillo
- Prime Minister: Héctor Valer; Aníbal Torres
- Preceded by: Juan Manuel Carrasco
- Succeeded by: Richard Tineo

Personal details
- Born: 14 October 1958 (age 67) Chota, Cajamarca, Peru
- Party: Patriotic Party of Peru
- Education: Peruvian Naval School (BS)

Military service
- Allegiance: Peru
- Branch/service: Peruvian Navy
- Rank: Counter admiral

José Luis Gavidia Arrascue (born 14 October 1958) is a retired counter admiral of the Peruvian Navy who served as the minister of Defense of Peru from February to August 2022.
