= Pedro Francke =

Peruvian economist (born 1960)

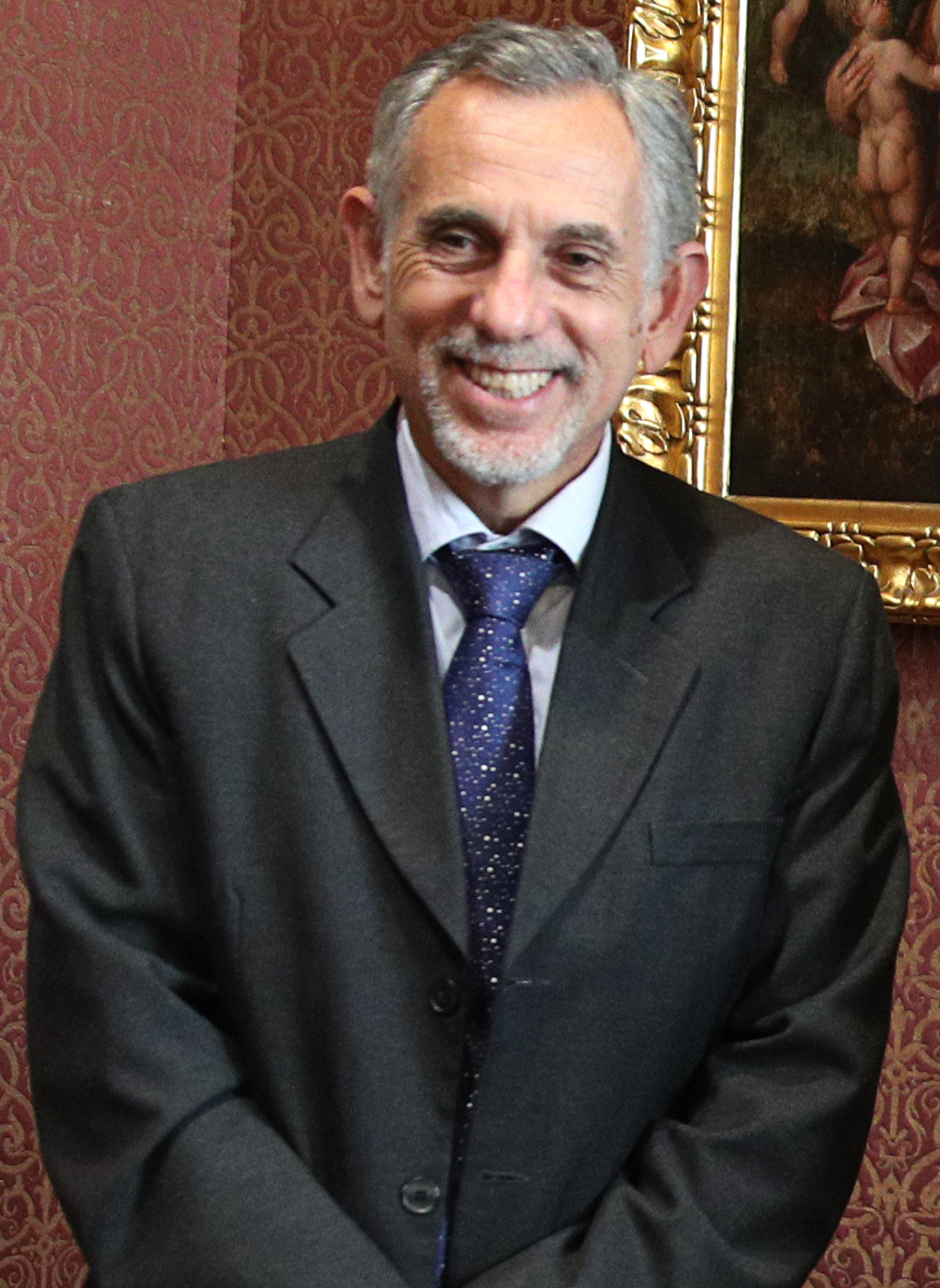

Minister of Economy and Finance
- In office 30 July 2021 – 1 February 2022
- President: Pedro Castillo
- Prime Minister: Guido Bellido; Mirtha Vásquez
- Preceded by: Waldo Mendoza
- Succeeded by: Óscar Graham

Director of the National Fund for Social Development Cooperation
- In office August 2001 – May 2002
- President: Alejandro Toledo
- Minister: Doris Sánchez; Cecilia Blondet

Personal details
- Born: 1 November 1960 (age 65) Lima, Peru
- Party: New Peru (2020-present)
- Other political affiliations: Broad Front (2010-2016)
- Education: Pontifical Catholic University of Peru (BA, MA)
- Occupation: Economist
- Website: pedrofrancke.com

Pedro Andrés Toribio Topiltzin Francke Ballvé (born 1 November 1960) is a Peruvian economist who served as the minister of economy and finance from 30 July 2021 to 1 February 2022. He has advised various politicians within Peru and is an expert on poverty, health and social policies studies.

== Economics career ==
Francke received his Master of Economics from the Pontifical Catholic University of Peru.

During his early economics career, Francke served as director of the Cooperation Fund for Social Development (FONCODES), a technical secretary for the Technical Secretary of the Interministerial Commission for Social Affairs, president of the Metropolitan System of Solidarity (SISOL) and the general manager of the Social Health Insurance of Peru (Essalud). Francke also served roles in the Central Reserve Bank of Peru and as an economist for the World Bank.

== Political career ==
With his economic advisory of politicians, Francke first assisted Verónika Mendoza and her political party with their policy ambitions. Following the surprising success of Pedro Castillo during the 2021 Peruvian general election, Francke began to serve as the main economic advisor of Castillo three days prior to the second round of elections. Daniel Rico of RBC Capital Markets credited Francke with calming markets fears of Castillo, who was characterized by opponents as a far-left politician.

Francke presented a roadmap for Castillo's "popular market economy" policies. One objective included creating one million jobs in Peru within one year by lowering interest rates, hiring workers for public investment programs, and promoting local production and consumption. Other main tasks were maintaining a balanced budget, controlling inflation, protecting private property, and renegotiating terms with large resource extraction companies. Francke said that Castillo was more similar to more successful Latin American leftist leaders, comparing him to Lula da Silva, Evo Morales, and José Mujica, and distanced Castillo from policies similar to Hugo Chávez, opposing actions taken in Venezuela such as nationalizations, price controls, currency controls, and complex foreign exchange rates.

=== Minister of Economy and Finance ===
On 30 July 2021, Francke was appointed Minister of Economy and Finance by President Pedro Castillo.

For his first international trips, President Castillo traveled to Mexico on 17 September 2021 and later to the United States on 19 September. During his tour in the United States, Castillo and Francke met with foreign investors, with two of Peru's largest investors, Freeport-McMoRan and BHP, sharing positive reactions and expressing confidence with the Castillo government following their meetings.

Francke resigned on 1 February 2022.

=== Sánchez candidacy ===
During the 2026 Peruvian general election, presidential candidate Roberto Sánchez made Francke his potential economic minister. Francke said that a Sánchez government would respect the autonomy of the Central Reserve Bank of Peru and would not engage in nationalizations, saying that exisiting economic contracts would remain recognized.
