= Luis Barranzuela =

Peruvian lawyer and politician

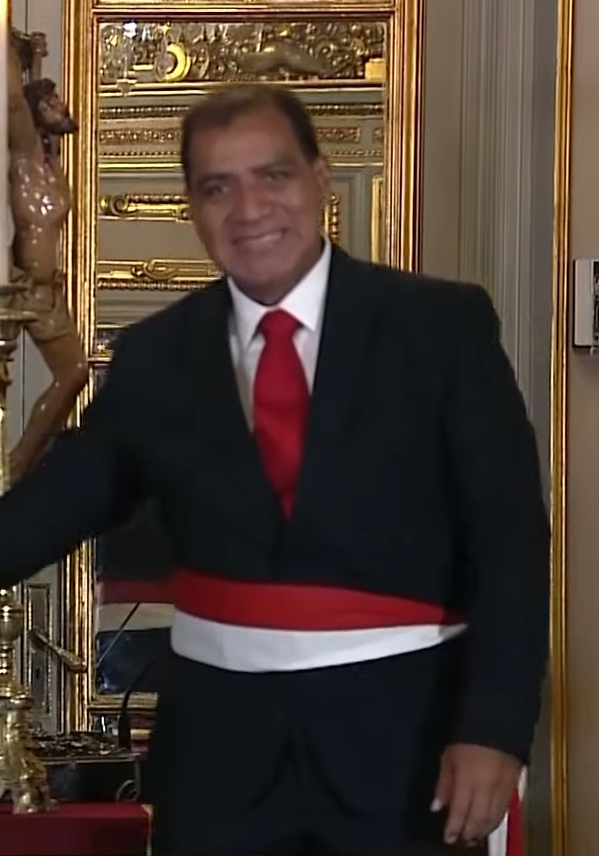

Minister of the Interior
- In office 6 October 2021 – 2 November 2021
- President: Pedro Castillo
- Prime Minister: Mirtha Vásquez
- Preceded by: Juan Manuel Carrasco
- Succeeded by: Avelino Guillén

Personal details
- Born: Luis Roberto Barranzuela Vite; 18 November 1962 (age 63) Lima, Peru
- Education: University of San Martín de Porres
- Profession: Lawyer, Police officer

Luis Roberto Barranzuela Vite (born 18 November 1962), is a Peruvian lawyer and former Minister of the Interior of Peru.

== Minister of the Interior ==
On 6 October 2021, Barranzuela was appointed Minister of the Interior of Peru in the Pedro Castillo government.
