= Variable import levy =

A variable import levy is a levy on imports that raises their price to a level at least as high as the domestic price.

This kind of levies are adjusted frequently (hence variable) in response to changes in world market prices, and are imposed to defend administered prices set above world market prices.

Under the Uruguay Round Agreement on Agriculture, the variable levies of the EU have been converted into fixed tariffs or tariff-rate quotas.

== See also ==
- Cross-border leasing
- Advance pricing agreement
