= Juan Manuel Carrasco =

Peruvian doctor and politician

Juan Carrasco
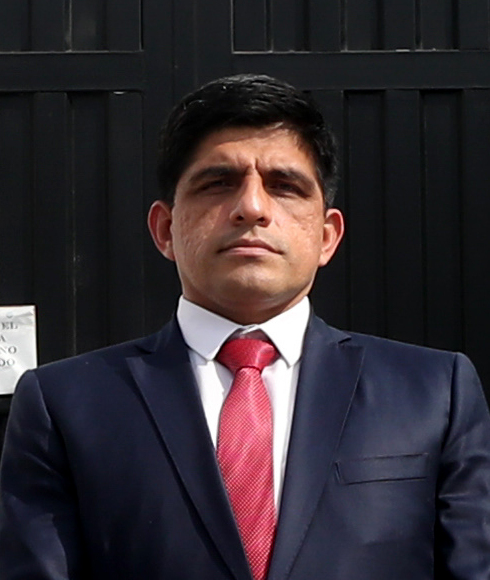

Minister of the Interior
- In office 17 November 2021 – 1 February 2022
- President: Pedro Castillo
- Prime Minister: Mirtha Vásquez

Minister of the Interior
- In office 29 July 2021 – 6 October 2021
- President: Pedro Castillo
- Prime Minister: Guido Bellido
- Preceded by: José Elice
- Succeeded by: Luis Barranzuela

Personal details
- Born: Juan Manuel Carrasco Millones; 24 December 1976 (age 49) Chiclayo, Lambayeque, Peru
- Education: Pedro Ruiz Gallo National University; University of Piura
- Profession: Lawyer

Juan Manuel Carrasco Millones (born 24 December 1976), is a Peruvian lawyer and former Minister of the Interior of Peru.

He served as head of the Special Prosecutor for Organized Crime in Lambayeque.

== Minister of the Interior ==
On 29 July 2021, Carrasco Millones was appointed Minister of the Interior of Peru in the Pedro Castillo government.
