= Lima Pride =

Annual LGBT event in Lima, Peru

International LGBT Pride Day
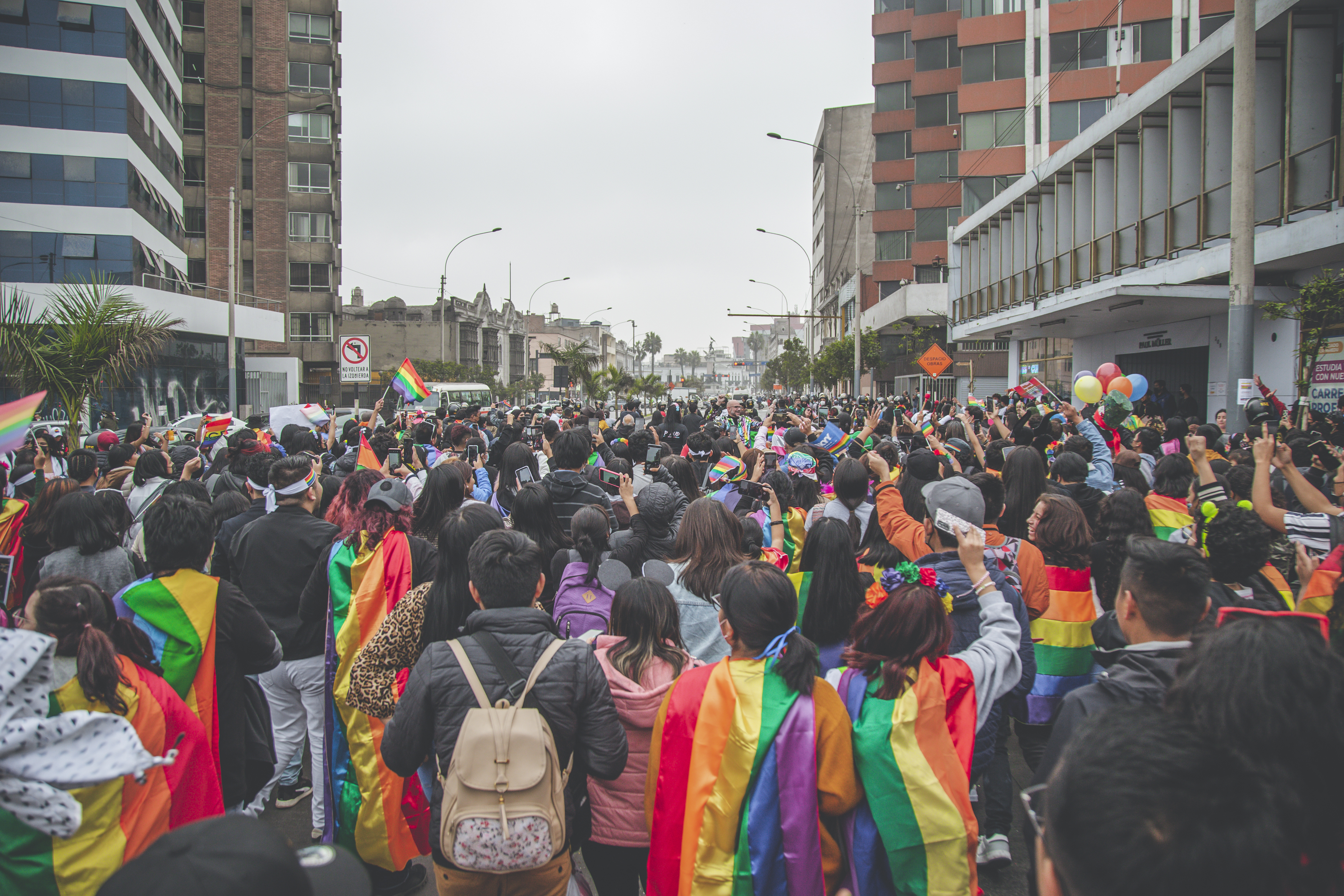
- 2022 Pride March
- Location: Lima
- Organizer: Lima Pride March Collective

The Lima LGBT Pride March (Spanish: Marcha del Orgullo LGBT de Lima) is a demonstration held annually in Lima, Peru. It celebrates International LGBT Pride Day and demands equal rights for LGBT people in Lima and across Peru.

The event was first held in 2002. Since that year, the date has changed from time to time, but it is usually held on the last Saturday of June or the first Saturday of July. The march includes LGBT rights groups, public officials, politicians, celebrities, and straight allies. The route usually starts at the El Campo de Marte in the Jesús María district. It goes through several avenues and plazas, and ends at Plaza San Martín in downtown Lima. There, a stage is set up for reading statements and putting on an artistic show.

== History ==
=== Background ===
At the end of the 1980s, the Peruvian LGBT community lived in fear of police raids and abuse, such as the televised raid in June 1987 on the lesbian bar “La Ferretería” in the Breña district, or the kidnappings and killings as a method of "social cleansing" carried out by subversive organisations such as Shining Path and the MRTA. These actions (called the "Black List" by members of the Shining Path and "crusades against vice" by the MRTA) led to massacres such as that of Aucayacu (1986) or the "Night of the Gardenias" (1989).

On 1 July 1995, on the occasion of International LGBT Pride Day and the 25th anniversary of the Stonewall riots, a group of LGBT people from the Movimiento Homosexual de Lima (MHOL), a civil association dedicated to the defence of LGBT rights in Peru, called a gathering in the Miraflores Parque Kennedy, which is considered the first LGBT demonstration in Lima. This plantón, which lasted about three hours, aimed to protest against the abuses and discrimination that the collective had been suffering at the hands of the authorities. Around thirty people attended the event, some of whom covered their faces to avoid possible reprisals in their family or work environment. The following gatherings were then held in the Plaza Francia in the Lima district, with a larger number of people and with the support of public figures, such as the vedette and congresswoman Susy Díaz. The gathering was repeated the following year up to the 2001 demonstration.

=== Lima Pride March ===
After these first demonstrations, on 6 July 2002 the “First Gay Parade”, the first Pride march in Peru, was organised. It was convened by the MHOL and had the support of the comedian and drag queen Juan Carlos Ferrando. Around thirty protesters attended this first march, who marched from the junction of 28 de Julio and Garcilaso de la Vega avenues, crossed Nicolás de Piérola and, when they already numbered a couple of hundred people, ended the route in Plaza Francia, where speeches and manifestos were read from a platform.

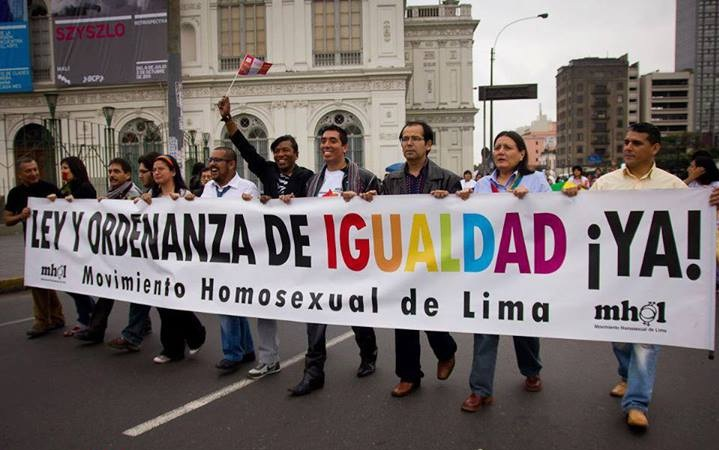
MHOL march on International LGBT Pride Day in 2011 in Lima.

On 2 July 2011 the tenth “Gay Pride March” was held in Lima with more than a thousand participants, among them the mayor of Lima Susana Villarán, politician Ronald Gamarra, and Carla García, daughter of then Peruvian president Alan García. On this occasion the motto of the march was “Equality law and ordinance now!”. The route started at the traditional point, Avenida de La Peruanidad next to Campo de Marte, but ended in Plaza Washington, after crossing Wilson Avenue, Paseo Colón, Paseo de la República, Jirón Carabaya, Plaza San Martín, Avenida La Colmena and Avenida Tacna. At the place where the demonstration ended, outside the Spanish Cultural Centre, an artistic event was held.

On 30 June 2012, under the motto "The 'Great Transformation'? Without us there is no inclusion", about 5,000 people attended the march. The slogan referred to the electoral promise of the elected president Ollanta Humala, winner of the 2011 general elections, to implement a national plan against homophobia. At the closing concert, among other artists, Peruvian rock singer Fiorella Cava, from JAS, performed; she had that year obtained a ruling from the Superior Court of Lima allowing her to adapt her legal name to her gender identity.

Video of the LGBT Pride march in Lima – 2022

The fourteenth LGBTI Pride March was held on 27 June 2015. The gathering time at Campo de Marte was 3:00 p.m.; afterwards the march advanced along Avenida 28 de Julio, Brasil and Alfonso Ugarte avenues, plaza Dos de Mayo, Avenida Nicolás de Piérola to Plaza San Martín. In addition, during the march a signature‑gathering campaign was carried out in support of the civil union bill. Notable politicians who accompanied the demonstrators were lawyer Julio Arbizu, politician and presidential candidate Verónika Mendoza and Augusto Rey, councillor of Lima. The main banner read “In the face of the State’s extermination, our bodies resist”. Television personalities also attended the annual event, such as actress Tatiana Astengo, singer Maricarmen Marín or journalists Pamela Vértiz and Lorena Álvarez; it is noteworthy that during the march, actor Carlos Victoria, son of Enrique Victoria, came out of the closet and introduced, through his social media, his partner with whom he had shared 20 years of relationship. Victoria joined the public declaration of his homosexuality by actor Ricardo Morán, who had done so a few months earlier and also participated in the LGBT march.

In 2017 one of the largest Pride marches in Peru took place. At the mobilisation, congressmen and congresswomen such as Carlos Bruce, Alberto de Belaunde, Marisa Glave and Indira Huilca were present, together with Peruvian cultural and political figures such as Beto Ortiz, Daniel Urresti, Mijael Garrido Lecca and Sigrid Bazán. The route was the usual one, from Campo de Marte to Plaza San Martín. The motto of that edition was “Don’t mess with equality”, alluding to the homophobic campaign of the ultra‑conservative movement Con mis hijos no te metas. According to GfK, 52% of respondents who were aware of the event (more than 60%) expressed themselves in favour of people who defend the rights of the gay population taking to the streets to demonstrate peacefully.

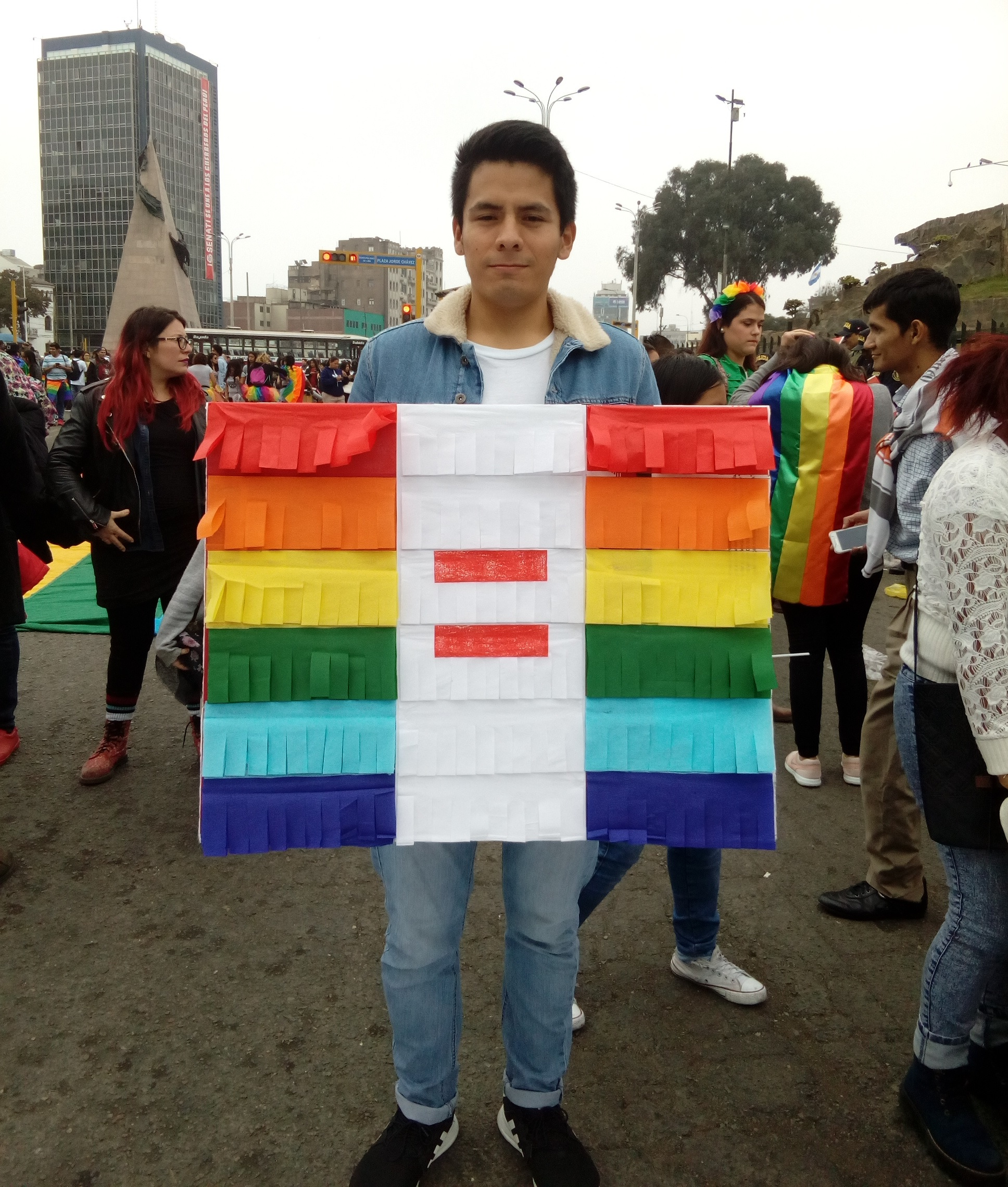
A demonstrator holding an LGBT flag similar to the Peruvian flag during the 2018 Gay Pride March in Lima.

The 2018 march, held on 30 June, brought together about 10,000 people under the motto “Education with a gender focus NOW!: For a school curriculum that includes lesbians, gays, bisexuals, trans and intersex people”. The gathering started at 2:00 p.m. and the march began three hours later with the presence of collectives such as the Association of Families for Sexual Diversity, the Inclusive Ecumenical Christian Community, Más Igualdad Perú, among others. The meeting point was the Campo de Marte in Jesús María, and the march went along De la Peruanidad, Guzmán Blanco, Paseo Colón, Garcilaso de la Vega, Nicolás de Piérola avenues and finally ended in Plaza San Martín, in the centre of Lima.

In 2019, the President of Congress, Daniel Salaverry, authorised a pre‑gathering in Plaza Bolívar in front of the Peruvian Congress two days before the main march. Although there was a tense moment between the demonstrators and the national police, which claimed not to have proof of such authorisation, the event was able to take place with a stage where manifestos of support were read out by activists and congresspeople of the Republic. On Saturday 29 June the pride march took place, departing from Campo de Marte at 2:00 p.m. and following the same route as the previous year. In this edition, the participation of Prime Minister Salvador del Solar stood out, the first Peruvian premier to attend an LGBT march. Artists Mónica Sánchez and Jason Day, and television presenter Ricardo Morán also took part.

In 2020, due to the COVID‑19 pandemic the march could not be held, so the Lima Pride March collective, the coordinating association of the demonstration, organised a virtual event with the hashtag #OrgulloEnLínea. To promote the virtual march a series of videos were released in support of the collective by political figures, such as congressmen Gino Costa and Daniel Olivares, and show business people, such as singers Sandra Muente and Daniela Darcourt.

In 2021, the march was called to take place virtually and in person. In the march that went through the streets of Lima, slogans and chants could be seen urging the winner of the general elections, Pedro Castillo, to ensure that his virtual government respects LGBT rights. The main motto of the march was “Bicentennial with Resistance and Visibility: For a Peru with Equality for All”.

On 25 June 2022 a new edition of the LGBTIQ+ community mobilisation was held in the centre of Lima, described by many as the most crowded in recent years. The motto on that occasion was "Pride in the streets". The following year, in 2023, the organisation estimated that 50,000 people attended the event.

==== March for the 100th anniversary of the decriminalisation of homosexuality ====
Video of Jorge Apolaya’s speech at the LGBT Pride march in Lima, 2024

In 2024 the 100th anniversary of the decriminalisation of homosexuality was commemorated, following the enactment, on 27 July 1924, of a new edition of the penal code that did not include article 272 of the 1863 Peruvian Penal Code, which criminalised sodomy.

There was uncertainty about the holding of the march due to delays in the approval of permits by the Metropolitan Municipality of Lima. The organisation warned that in the absence of a response, it would be interpreted as administrative silence. Finally, eleven days before the date of the march, the mayor of Lima, the conservative Rafael López Aliaga, announced that the march had been pre‑approved, but asked that those attending “not clown around” and that they must “respect their beliefs”, referring to the use of the image of Rosa de Lima on the poster of the OutFestPerú in 2023.

On 19 June 2024 the press conference of the Lima Pride March collective, which organises the activities for LGBTIQ+ Pride Day, was held. Among the main announcements it was reported that the diversion and route plans for the march had been approved so that Pride Day could be celebrated on 29 June. The start was scheduled for 3:00 p.m. on Guzmán Blanco Avenue, continuing along Alfonso Ugarte, Nicolás de Piérola avenues and ending on Wilson. The return route went along 28 de Julio Avenue, ending on La Peruanidad Avenue. Likewise, the Ministry of Health was declared a persona non grata institution for classifying trans identities as mental illnesses in Supreme Decree 009‑2024, so it did not participate in the march.

On 29 June 2024 the LGBTIQ+ Pride March 2024 took place in Lima, Arequipa and other cities in Peru. This event began at 3 p.m. in Campo de Marte. Congresswomen Flor Pablo, Sigrid Bazán, Susel Paredes and Ruth Luque took part in the march. The motto of this year was “100 Years Resisting”.

During the month of June and the first week of July 2024, 35 pride marches took place throughout Peru, in the following locations and on the following dates:

- 14 June: Chulucanas.
- 22 June: Abancay, Huaral, Huaraz and Huancayo.
- · 23 June: Chancay, Chimbote and Huacho.
- 27 June: Ilo and Picota.
- 28 June: Cañete, Chachapoyas, Huanta, Huarmey, Ica, Iquitos, Juliaca, Mollendo, Piura, Pucallpa and Tarapoto.
- 29 June: Arequipa, Ayacucho, Cajamarca, Juanjuí, Lima, Puno, Tacna, Trujillo, Tumbes and Yurimaguas.
- 30 June: Moquegua.
- · 6 July: Barranca, Chiclayo and Cusco.

This year the organisations of Callao marched together with those of Lima.

==== Lima Pride March 2025 ====
On 28 June the Lima Pride March took place; according to figures from the Peruvian national police, more than 40,000 attendees were recorded. Unlike previous years, the new route was held in the streets of the Jesús María district. The gathering was held on Avenida de la Peruanidad, next to the Campo de Marte, with a circular route that continued along Avenida Salaverry, Avenida San Felipe, Avenida Garzón, Avenida Veintiocho de Julio and ended again at Avenida de la Peruanidad.

== Other Peruvian marches ==
In addition to the Lima march, the event is celebrated in other Peruvian cities where local collectives have organised and joined the mobilisation. This is the case of Arequipa, Ayacucho, Barranca, Chancay, Cuzco, Chiclayo, Chimbote, Huancayo, Huaral, Huaura, Ica, Iquitos, Moquegua, Paita, Piura, Pucallpa, Supe, Tacna, Tarapoto, Trujillo and Yurimaguas. In June 2012, the first Gay Pride March in the Constitutional Province of Callao was held. In 2019, the march in Trujillo gathered around 2,000 people, and counted with the participation of Luisa Revilla, the first trans councillor in Peru.

== See also ==
- LGBTQ rights in Peru
- LGBTQ history in Peru
- Homosexuality in pre-Columbian Peru
