= People's Democratic Bloc =

Bloque Democrático Popular
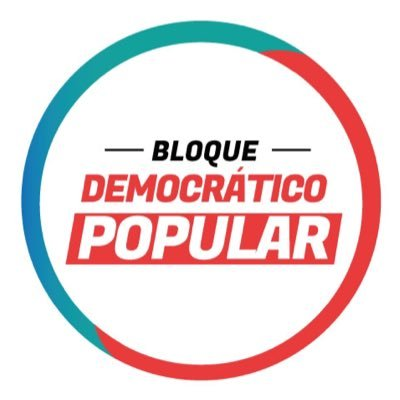
- Spokesperson: Vacant
- Founded: April 12, 2022; July 25, 2024
- Headquarters: Lima
- Ideology: Social democracy Democratic Socialism; Progressivism
- Political position: Center-left to left-wing
- National affiliation: New Peru; PLG; In Movement; Popular Cooperation
- Seats: 5 / 130

The Democratic People's Bloc (Spanish: Bloque Democrático Popular) is a parliamentary group that was created on 13 April 2022 and re‑founded on 25 July 2024. It is made up of 4 of the 5 congressmen elected by the defunct coalition Together for Peru.

== History ==
In view of the 2018 subnational elections, the various Peruvian left-wing groups formed the Together for Peru coalition (registered as a political party with the JNE). The alliance is maintained for the Peruvian general elections of 2021, whose presidential candidate was Verónika Mendoza of the New Peru movement. The alliance won 5 of 130 seats.

Congressman	Political Affiliation
Sigrid Bazán	Nuevo Perú
Ruth Luque	Nuevo Perú
Isabel Cortez	Together for Peru
Edgard Reymundo	Together for Peru
Roberto Sánchez	Together for Peru

In April 2022, the congressmen of Together for Peru (a dissolved coalition that retains electoral registration as a political party) re-found the parliamentary group with the name Democratic Change - Together for Peru. It is made up of legislators Sigrid Bazán (Nuevo Perú), Ruth Luque (En Movimiento), Edgard Raymundo, Isabel Cortez, Roberto Sánchez (JP). They occupy an ordinary commission for the legislature August 2022 - July 2023.

The following year, March 2023, the four congressmen of the dissolved Perú Democrático bench (Guillermo Bermejo (Voces del Pueblo), Hamlet Echevarría, Nieves Limachi and Luis Kamiche) join the parliamentary group "Cambio Democrático - Juntos por el Perú". In July 2023, the non-grouped congresswoman Susel Paredes (Primero La Gente) joins. In total, they occupy 10 seats and chair 2 ordinary commissions for the legislature August 2023 - July 2024. In March 2024, legislator Víctor Cutipa joins.

In July 2024, Cambio Democrático is refounded as Bloque Democrático Popular (initially as Frente Democrático) and brings together 5 congressmen of the 11 in the bench: Sigrid Bazán (Nuevo Perú), Susel Paredes (Primero La Gente), Ruth Luque (En Movimiento), Edgard Reymundo and Isabel Cortez.

== Members ==
=== Composition (2022-2023) ===
Congressmen of Democratic Change - Together for Peru
Name	Militancy	Constituency
Sigrid Bazán Narro	New Peru	Lima
Ruth Luque Ibarra	New Peru	Cusco
Edgard Reymundo Mercado	Together for Peru	Junín
Isabel Cortez Aguirre	Together for Peru	Lima
Roberto Sánchez	Together for Peru	Lima

=== Composition (2023-2024) ===
Congressmen of Democratic Change - Together for Peru
Name	Militancy	Constituency
Sigrid Bazán Narro	New Peru	Lima
Ruth Luque Ibarra	In Movement	Cusco
Susel Paredes Piqué	People First	Lima
Edgard Reymundo Mercado	-	Junín
Isabel Cortez Aguirre	-	Lima
Roberto Sánchez	Together for Peru	Lima
Guillermo Bermejo Rojas	Voices of the People	Lima
Nieves Limachi Quispe	-	Tacna
Hamlet Echeverría Rodríguez	-	Cajamarca
Roberto Kamiche Morante	-	La Libertad
Victor Cutipa Ccama	-	Moquegua

=== Composition (2024-2026) ===
Congressmen of the Popular Democratic Bloc
Name	Militancy	Constituency
Sigrid Bazán Narro	New Peru	Lima
Ruth Luque Ibarra	In Movement	Cusco
Edgard Reymundo Mercado	-	Junín
Carlos Zeballos Madariaga	Popular Cooperation	Puno
Susel Paredes Piqué	People First	Lima
