= Vote of no confidence against José Jerí =

2026 removal of the president of Peru

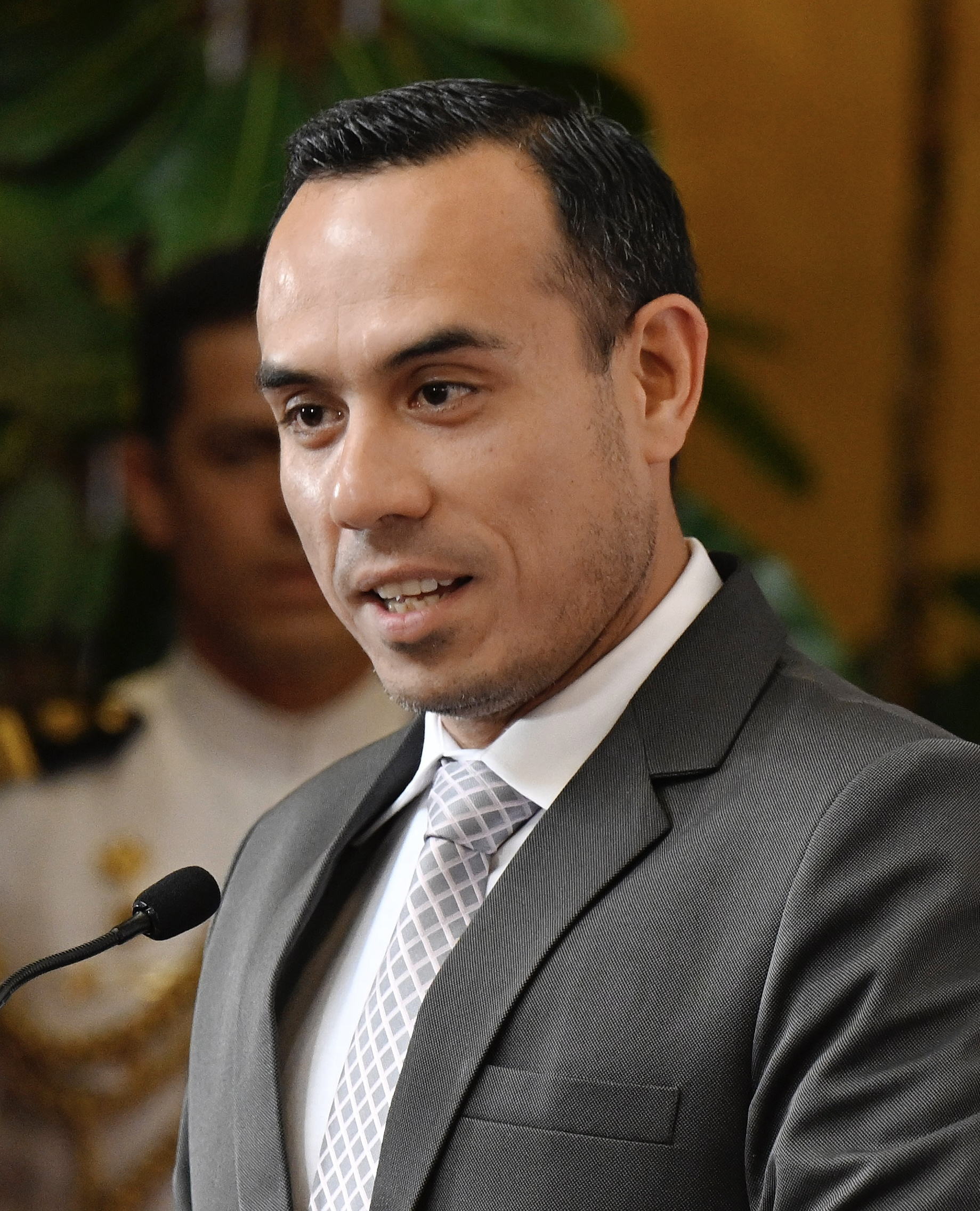
- Jerí in 2025
- Accused: José Jerí, president of Peru
- Proponents: Congress of Peru
- Date: 17 February 2026
- Outcome: Vote of no confidence successful: Jerí removed as President of Congress and president of Peru; José María Balcázar elected by Congress as President of Congress and succeeds Jerí as president of Peru
- Charges: Clandestine meetings with Chinese businessman Zhihua Yang

On 17 February 2026, the Peruvian Congress approved the motion of no confidence of José Jerí from the position of president of Peru under a vote of no confidence. Unlike impeachment, which requires a supermajority of 87 in the 130-member legislature, Congress voted to remove Jerí, stripping him of his title as President of Congress with a simple majority of 66 votes. His presidential status from succession (being the constitutional president of the republic ex officio as president of Congress) meant that this removed him from the presidency. Jerí became the sixth president removed by Congress, and the fourth of the 2020s, after Guillermo Billinghurst (1914), Alberto Fujimori (2000), Martín Vizcarra (2020), Pedro Castillo (2022), and Dina Boluarte (2025).

Several opposition parties put forward seven motions against Jerí during the extraordinary plenary session. Jerí has been accused of misconduct after holding private, unofficial meetings with Zhihua Yang, a Chinese businessman who holds a state-granted concession for one of his companies. The only parties who voted against the impeachment proceedings were We Are Peru, led by Jerí, and Popular Force, led by Keiko Fujimori. Jerí's impeachment was structured as a vote of no confidence rather than the traditional "permanent moral incapacity" under Article 113 of the Constitution of Peru.

Fernando Rospigliosi, acting president of Congress, declared after the vote that the office of President of the Congress of the Republic is vacant, and consequently, the office of Constitutional President of the Republic is vacant. Jerí accepted the outcome. Following Jerí's removal, Rospigliosi, who had been the acting president of Congress since Jerí's ascension to the presidency, declined to run for the office. Subsequently, Congressman José María Balcázar was elected president by the Congress on 18 February.

== Background ==
=== Impeachment of Dina Boluarte ===
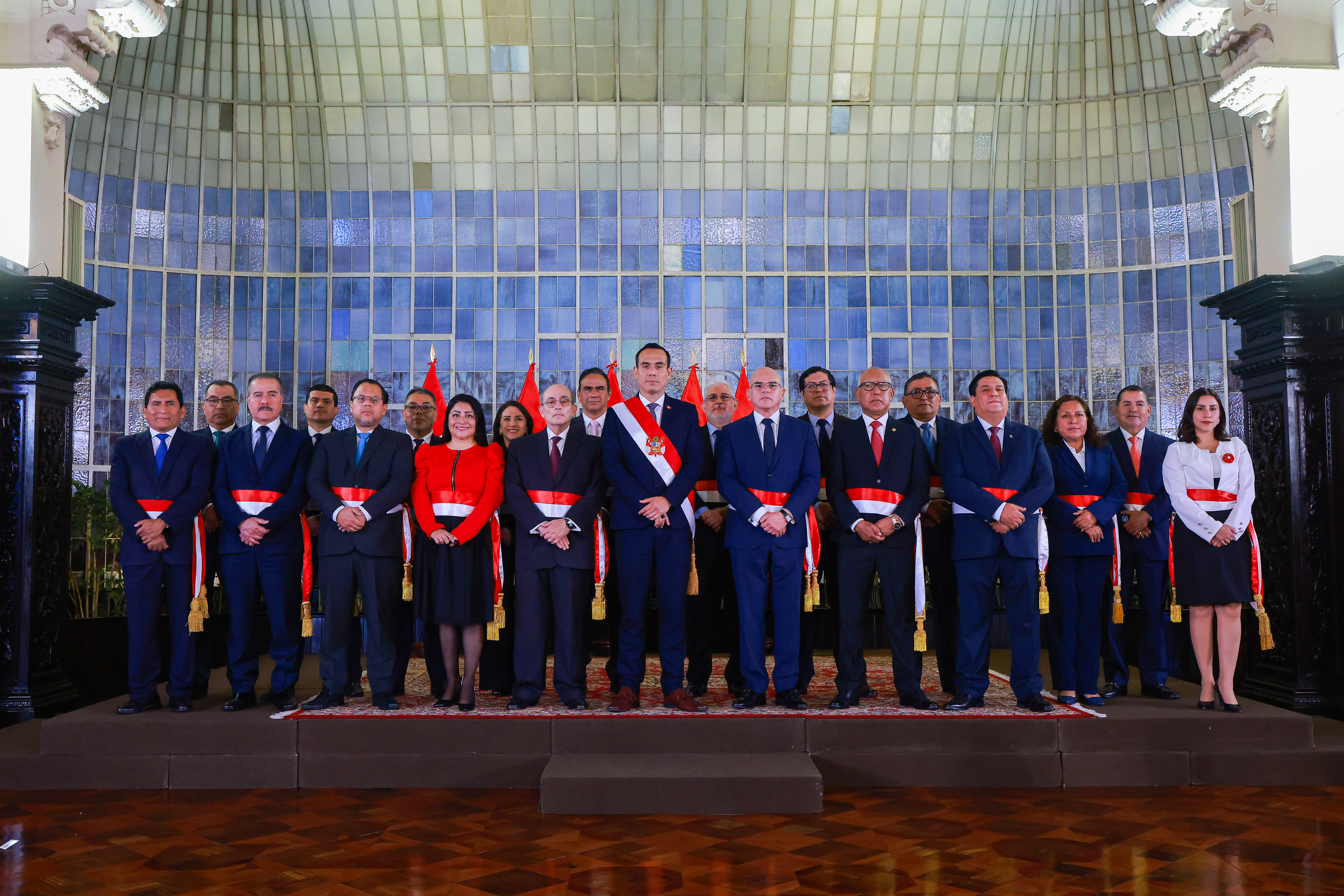
President José Jerí and his cabinet shortly after assuming the presidency

After the unanimous impeachment and removal of President Dina Boluarte on 10 October 2025, Jerí acceded to the presidency in his capacity as president of the legislature and the next in the presidential line of succession established in the Peruvian Constitution, as Boluarte had no vice presidents. He became the eighth individual to serve as President since the resignation of Pedro Pablo Kuczynski in 2018, a span of just over seven years.

=== 2025 Peruvian protests ===
The ongoing protests in Peru intensified after Jerí assumed the presidency. In Lima, thousands participated in demonstrations and protesters chanted "The rapist is Jerí" and "Jerí is a violin", with "violin" being Peruvian slang for a rapist, due to allegations of sexual assault committed by Jerí. The clashes resulted in one protester being killed and over 80 injured after police fired pellets at demonstrators.

In late October 2025, Jerí refused to resign, stating "My responsibility is to maintain the stability of the country." Peruvian prime minister Ernesto Álvarez Miranda, an ultraconservative judge popular on social media who described the protesters as being subversives days earlier on 10 October, announced that the government would declare a state of emergency.

=== Chifagate ===
Jerí held clandestine meetings with Chinese businessmen, especially with Zhihua Yang, in places such as a chifa restaurant on 26 December 2025 and the "Market Capón" in the Barrio Chino on 6 January 2026, Jerí justified it as a simple candy purchase. The first meeting, held at a Chinese restaurant in Lima on December 26, sparked controversy after images showed the president entering the establishment wearing a hood. Neither of these meetings was registered in presidential records. Yang was reported to have attempted to sell US$30 million in surveillance cameras for public buses. Jerí also visited another Chinese businessman, Jiwu Xiaodong, who was under house arrest for illegal activities.

In February 2026, the Attorney General's Office had raised questions about Yang's potential interference in government decisions and contracts. They also alleged that Jerí had lied before Congress and in media interviews about his dealings with Yang. Jerí acknowledged the meetings took place and apologized for how they had been conducted.

The scandal had fueled tensions over one of Peru's biggest challenges on how to balance relations between China, one of its largest trade partners, and the US, which is against China's influence. The US Bureau of Western Hemisphere Affairs said it was "concerned" about reports that Peru could be powerless to oversee one of its largest ports, Chancay, which it said was managed by "predatory" Chinese owners.

=== Allegations of irregular hiring ===
Jerí faced a second investigation involving allegations of irregular hiring of several women (Note: Which include: Alexandra Camargo Leiva, Fiorella Jannette Melgarejo Sánchez, Susana Carolina Gutiérrez Rivera, Hilda Denisse Zapata Juárez, Etiëne Tanja Henriquez Cortez, Rossmary Malpartida Osto, Angélica Aznarán Ríos y Rosa Gabriela Rueda Yaya.) during his tenure. These female hires were described as young and inexperienced. Other hirings of female employees took place during the night or on holidays, which raised further concerns about his administration's transparency.

== Motion of no confidence ==
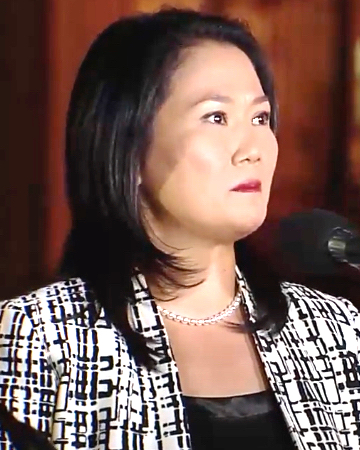
Popular Force leader Keiko Fujimori defended Jerí, and her party voted against the seven motions against him.

The first motion of no confidence was presented by Ruth Luque from Democratic Change and was admitted at 10 am with 71 votes in favor, 18 against, and 4 abstentions, the fifth motion was presented by Esdras Medina from Popular Renewal with 78 votes in favor and 23 votes against. The opposition parties to congress filed a total of seven motions. There was a brief debate period during the extraordinary plenary session. Congresswoman Ana Zegarra of We Are Peru attempted to delay the proceedings, but her efforts were rejected by the Congress after a point of order was approved.

During the impeachment proceedings, commentators noted a rift between the right-wing parties Popular Renewal and Popular Force. Popular Renewal leader Rafael López Aliaga attempted to create a coalition of Popular Force and Jerí supporters, however this did not materialize. Popular Force leader Keiko Fujimori criticized Popular Force and those who supported the censure for being "politically immature" and accused them of generating political instability.

The Peruvian congress successfully removed Jerí after a motion of no confidence with 75 votes in favor and 24 votes against. Only his own party and the Fujimorist Popular Force voted against his censure. President of Congress Fernando Rospigliosi made the formal announcement that Jerí had been removed from power. Ruth Luque, one of the lawmakers who backed the censure measures, said she wanted to replace Jeri with a leader who would put public interest and security first, ahead of a new president coming into office. The final motion was passed at 2:30 PM and Jerí was formally removed from the presidency.

=== Constitutional mechanism ===
The structure of this vote of no confidence differed from the traditional "permanent moral incapacity" under Article 113 of the Constitution of Peru. Instead, this impeachment was structured as a vote of no confidence in his capacity as president of Congress, and only required a simple majority of 66 votes or fewer, provided fewer deputies are present. Originally during the censure, Free Peru aimed to impeach Jerí under Article 113, but later accepted a censure vote instead due to it being more tangible in votes.

=== Voting results ===
The results were:

President	Date	Vote	First motion	Second motion	Third motion	Fourth motion	Fifth motion	Sixth motion	Seventh motion
José Jerí; We Are Peru	17 February 2026 Motion approved Office vacated	✓ Yes	71	69	73	76	78	74	72
José Jerí; We Are Peru	17 February 2026 Motion approved Office vacated	✗ No	18	26	25	19	23	21	23
José Jerí; We Are Peru	17 February 2026 Motion approved Office vacated	Abstain	4	0	0	0	0	1	0

== Aftermath ==
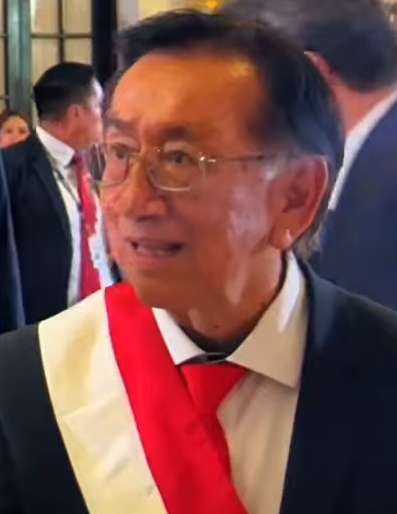
On 18 February, Congressman José María Balcázar was elected as Jerí's successor.

Acting President of Congress Fernando Rospigliosi, who would have been next in line for the presidency, declined to assume the office, necessitating a vote by Congress to appoint a new president. Several news organizations noted the political instability in the country due to the rapid removal procedures targeting Jerí and some of his predecessors. The Washington Post noted that his removal triggered a "fresh wave of political instability" just weeks before the 2026 general election.

On 18 February, four candidates were nominated for consideration as Jerí's successor: Congressman Edgard Reymundo of Together for Peru, Congressman José María Balcázar of Free Peru, Congresswoman Maricarmen Alva of Popular Action and Congressman Héctor Acuña of Honor and Democracy. After several hours of voting, the two finalists were Maricarmen Alva and José María Balcázar. Balcázar received 46 votes, Alva received 43, Acuña received 13 and Reymundo received 7. Following the elimination of Reymundo and Acuña, congressional members of the Together for Peru and Honor and Democracy parties declined to participate in the run-off voting.

Prior to final voting, Alva was considered to be the front runner to be elected. However, on the final ballot, Balcázar was elected president by a narrow margin of 60 to 54 votes. He was sworn in as president of the Congress and as interim president shortly afterwards.

=== Election ===
Candidate	Parliamentary group	First ballot		Second ballot	
Candidate	Parliamentary group	Votes	%	Votes	%
José María Balcázar	Free Peru	46	42.20	64	58.18
Maricarmen Alva	Popular Action	43	39.45	46	41.82
Héctor Acuña	Honor and Democracy	13	11.93		
Edgard Reymundo	People's Democratic Bloc	7	6.42		
Total		109	100.00	110	100.00
Valid votes		109	93.16	110	97.35
Invalid votes		7	5.98	3	2.65
Blank votes		1	0.85	0	0.00
Total votes		117	100.00	113	100.00
Registered voters/turnout		130	90.00	130	86.92
Source: Congress
