= 1978 Lima trans protest =

Protest in Peru

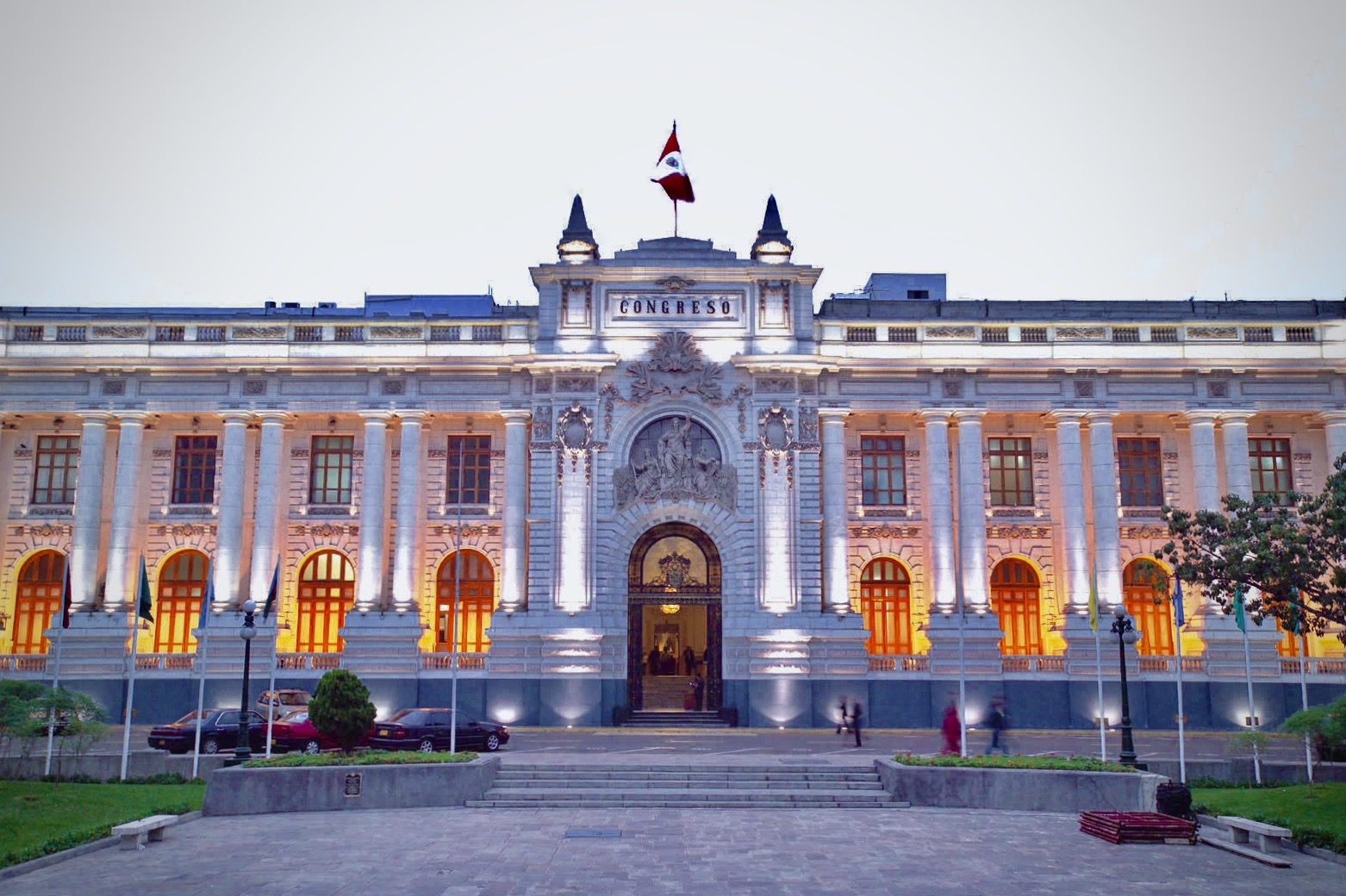
- The Peruvian Legislative Palace, where the protest took place
- Date: December 5, 1978
- Location: Legislative Palace, Lima, Peru; 12.0253°S 77.0131°W
- Type: Protest
- Outcome: Protestors meet with legislator Lauro Muñoz

The 1978 Lima trans protest took place on 5 December 1978 at the Legislative Palace in Lima, Peru, the location of the Congress of the Republic, becoming the first LGBTQ+ demonstration in Peru and which demanded from the Constituent Assembly various forms of LGBTQ rights.

== History ==
The protest was led by three transgender people; the artists Francis Day, Damonett and Giselle. At the time, they were performing a show at the "Palais Concert" cafe-theater on Manuel Bonilla Street in the Miraflores district, titled "Travestis en la Prostituyente," which consisted of a satire regarding the development of the Constituent Assembly of Peru that at that time was drafting the new Constitution.

The protest took place on 5 December 1978, in front of the Legislative Palace, and was held to demand respect and protection for people of the "third sex" (as the LGBTQ+ community was known at the time), as well as an end to police abuse against them. They managed to meet with legislator Lauro Muñoz Garay of the Christian People's Party (PPC), to whom they delivered a memorandum addressed to the Special Commission on Human Rights of the Constituent Assembly, which, among other things, requested legislation that "no one, under any circumstances, due to their sexual behavior, may be subjected to torture or inhuman, humiliating, or discriminatory treatment or punishment." However, their demands were not included in the final draft of the Constitution.

Various news outlets reported on the protest: Issue 44 of the magazine Oiga included a cover photograph of Francis Day during his meeting with Lauro Muñoz with the headline El tercer sexo en el primer poder, while the newspaper Expreso headlined "Travestis fueron a la Asamblea", also accompanied by a photograph of the protestors.

== See also ==
- LGBTQ rights in Peru
- Article 272 of the Penal Code of Peru
