= Historical composition of the Peruvian Congress =

This is a list of the composition of the Congress of the Republic of Peru since the adoption of the current Constitution of Peru in 1993 starting with the 1995 elections.

== Peruvian Congress of 1995–2000 ==
On July 27, 1995 a new unicameral Congress was created with the following distribution by political party:

- Change 90-New Majority (Alberto Fujimori): 67 seats
- Union for Peru (Javier Pérez de Cuéllar): 17 seats
- Peruvian Aprista Party (Mercedes Cabanillas): 8 seats
- Independent Moralizing Front (Fernando Olivera): 6 seats
- Democratic Convergence-Possible Country (Alejandro Toledo): 5 seats
- Popular Action (Raúl Diez Canseco): 4 seats
- Christian People's Party (Luis Bedoya Reyes): 3 seats
- National Renovation (Rafael Rey): 3 seats
- United Left (Agustín Haya de la Torre): 2 seats
- OBRAS (Ricardo Belmont Cassinelli): 2 seats
- FREPAP (Ezequiel Ataucusi Gamonal): 1 seat
- National Front of Workers and Peasants (Roger Cáceres Velásquez): 1 seat
- Agrarian Independent Movement (-): 1 seat

== Peruvian Congress of 2000–2001 ==
On July 27, 2000 the Congress of the Republic was established. This Congressional period was marked with various episodes of members of Congress switching their party affiliation. The following distribution marks seats by party at the end of the 2000-2001 term:

- Peru 2000 (Alberto Fujimori): 52 seats
- Peru Possible (Alejandro Toledo): 29 seats
- Independent Moralizing Front (Fernando Olivera): 9 seats
- Somos Perú: (Alberto Andrade) 8 seats
- Peruvian Aprista Party: 6 seats
- National Solidarity (Luis Castañeda) 5 seats
- Avancemos (Federico Salas): 3 seats
- Popular Action (Víctor Andrés García Belaúnde): 3 seats
- Union for Peru (Máximo San Román: 3 seats
- FREPAP: 1 seat

== Peruvian Congress of 2001–2006 ==
On July 21, 2001 a new Congress of the Peruvian Republic was established the following is a distribution of Congress members by political party affiliation:

- Peru Possible (Alejandro Toledo): 35 seats
- Peruvian Aprista Party (Alan García): 28 seats
- National Unity (Lourdes Flores): 12 seats
- Independent Moralizing Front (Fernando Olivera): 7 seats
- Somos Perú (Alberto Andrade): 6 seats
- Other parties: 27 seats

== Peruvian Congress of 2006–2011 ==
A new Peruvian Congress of the Republic was established in July 2006 with the following distribution:

- Union for Peru (Ollanta Humala): 45 seats.
- Peruvian Aprista Party (Alan García): 36 seats.
- National Unity (Lourdes Flores): 17 seats.
- Alliance for the Future (Martha Chávez): 13 seats.
- Center Front (Valentín Paniagua): 5 seats.
- Possible Peru (Alejandro Toledo): 2 seats.
- National Restoration (Humberto Lay): 2 seats.

== Peruvian Congress of 2011–2016 ==
- Peru Wins (Ollanta Humala): 47 seats.
- Force 2011 (Keiko Fujimori): 37 seats.
- Possible Peru (Alejandro Toledo): 21 seats.
- Alliance for the Great Change (Pedro Pablo Kuczynski): 12 seats.
- Alliance National Solidarity (Luis Castañeda): 9 seats.
- Peruvian Aprista Party (Alan Garcia): 4 seats.

== Peruvian Congress of 2016–2020 ==
- Popular Force (Keiko Fujimori): 73 seats.
- Broad Front (Verónika Mendoza): 20 seats.
- Peruvians for Change (Pedro Pablo Kuczynski): 18 seats.
- Alliance for Progress (César Acuña): 9 seats.
- Popular Action (Alfredo Barnechea): 5 seats.
- Peruvian Aprista Party (Alan García): 5 seats.

== Peruvian Congress of 2020–2021 ==
- Popular Action: 25 seats
- Alliance for Progress: 22 seats
- FREPAP: 15 seats
- Popular Force: 15 seats
- Union for Peru: 13 seats
- We Are Peru: 11 seats
- Purple Party: 9 seats
- Broad Front: 9 seats

== Peruvian Congress of 2021–2026 ==
- Free Peru: 37
- Popular Force: 24 seats
- Popular Action: 16 seats
- Alliance for Progress: 15 seats
- Popular Renewal: 13 seats
- Go on Country - Social Integration Party: 7 seats
- Together for Peru: 5 seats
- We Are Peru: 5 seats
- Podemos Perú: 5 seats
- Purple Party: 3 seats
