= Edgard Reymundo =

Peruvian politician

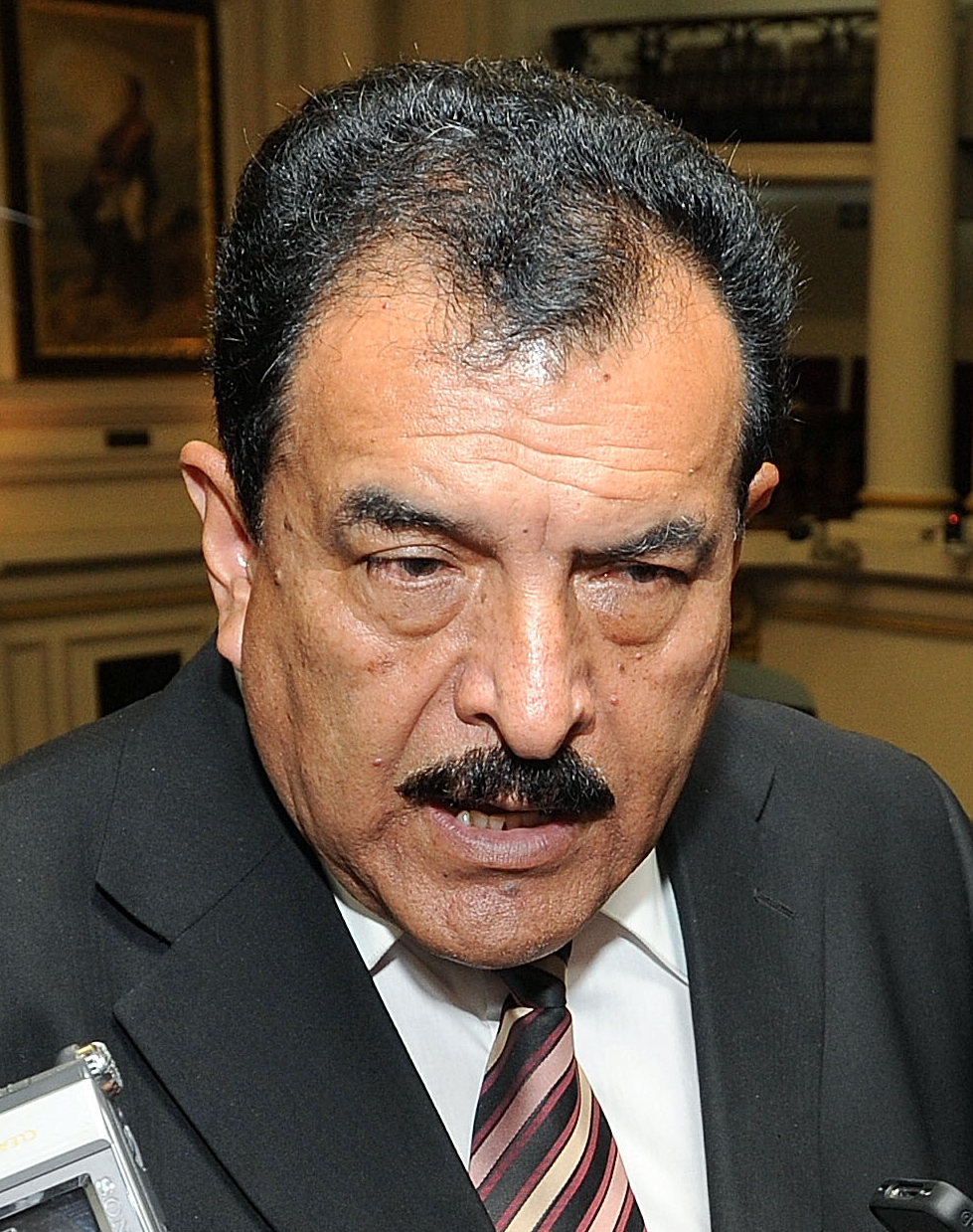
- Reymundo in 2021

Member of Congress
- In office 27 July 2021 – 26 July 2026
- Constituency: Junín
- In office 27 July 2006 – 26 July 2011
- Constituency: Junín

Personal details
- Born: Edgard Cornelio Reymundo Mercado; 26 February 1952 (age 74) Arequipa, Arequipa, Peru
- Party: Together for Peru (2020–present); New Peru (2020–present)
- Other political affiliations: Union for Peru; Possible Peru
- Occupation: Politician

Edgard Cornelio Reymundo Mercado (born 26 February 1952) is a Peruvian politician and a former Congressman representing Junín for the 2006–2011 term. Reymundo belongs to the Union for Peru party. Reymundo resigned from Congress in order to run for the regional presidency of Junín for the Bloque Popular party for the 2010 regional elections, but he lost to Vladimir Cerron. In the 2021 elections, he was re-elected to Congress under the Together for Peru coalition, after a decade of absence.

== Biography ==
He was born in Arequipa on February 26, 1952. He completed his primary studies in Acobamba, Huancavelica department, and secondary studies in the city of Huancayo, both at the Salesiano College and at the Tupac Amaru Great School Unit and, finally, the Mariscal Castilla College. Between 1969 and 1974 he studied sociology at the Universidad Nacional del Centro del Perú and between 1984 and 1988 he studied law at the Universidad San Martín de Porres in Lima. His professional development has been developed in both the public and private sectors.

=== Political career ===
Between 2004 and 2009 he was a member of the Union for Peru party, from which he separated to found in 2010 the regional movement Bloque Popular Junín, from which he separated in December 2019. His first applications were made by the United Left, and in the municipal elections of 1980 in which he was elected as district councillor of Chilca. In the municipal elections of 1983 he was elected District Mayor of Chilca. He tried reelection in the 1986 municipal elections without success. In 1995, he ran for general elections as a candidate for Congressman for the Union for Peru without success. In the 2002 regional elections, he was a candidate for Junín's regional councillor for Peru Posible without success. In the general elections of 2006, he was elected a congressman for Junín by the Union for Peru party. In the 2014 regional elections, he ran as a candidate for Regional President of Junín, obtaining less than 4% of the votes. In the 2021 elections, he was re-elected to Congress under the Together for Peru coalition, after a decade of absence.

On 18 February 2026, following the censure and removal of President José Jerí, Reymundo was nominated by Together for Peru for President of Congress and for the presidency of Peru.
