= Law 32331 =

Law No. 32331 (Spanish: Ley n.º 32331), officially the Law Strengthening the Right to Sexual Integrity of Children and Adolescents (Spanish: Ley que fortalece el derecho a la indemnidad sexual de los niños y adolescentes), is a Peruvian law passed by the Congress of the Republic on 2 April 2025, and promulgated on 12 May by the Peruvian government in the official gazette El Peruano. According to its text, the law "seeks to strengthen the right to sexual integrity of children and adolescents", (Note: According to Article 2.1 of the law, "sexual integrity" refers to "the right of children and adolescents to be protected from interference, influences, or stimuli that may affect their psychosocial development and sexual formation".) explicitly banning transgender people from using restrooms according to their gender identity. It was promoted by Congressman Alejandro Muñante of the Popular Renewal party.

== Background ==
The prohibition on transgender people using restrooms according to their gender identity dates back to August 2023, when a citizen publicly denounced Lima Airport Partners on social media for establishing restrooms for "all persons with a female identity" and another for "all persons with a male identity" at Jorge Chávez International Airport. Following this complaint, Jorge Montoya, a congressman for the Popular Renewal party, proposed Bill No. 6505/2023-CR in November 2023 to prohibit inclusive restrooms in public spaces that have "ambiguous signs that could mislead or confuse users regarding access to men's and women's restrooms". The bill did not pass as Montoya withdrew it, but the pressure led the airport operator to reconsider its inclusion strategy and change the signs to "women in their diversity" and "men in their diversity".

In February 2025, Congressman Alejandro Muñante of the Popular Renewal party introduced Bill No. 8457/2003-CR, which explicitly prohibited transgender people from using restrooms "that do not correspond to their biological sex". The bill was approved on 17 February by the Congressional Committee on Women and Family, citing the need to protect children. In the approval report, Congressman Muñante's bill was merged with the one proposed and withdrawn by Montoya in 2023, a process that transgender rights organizations consider irregular.

On 31 March, International Transgender Day of Visibility, Congresswoman Susel Paredes of the People's Democratic Bloc encouraged some transgender guests at the event Diversidad y Derechos: Luchando por la Igualdad y Justicia ("Diversity and Rights: Fighting for Equality and Justice"), which she organized at the Legislative Palace, to use the women's restrooms, an act that was criticized by conservative politicians. Days later, on 3 April, Paredes was confronted by a reporter about the incident and asked about her gender identity, which she denounced on social media as verbal abuse. Subsequently, the Congressional Ethics Committee approved an investigation into her for the incident.

In April 2025, the president of Congress, Eduardo Salhuana, stated that the body's authorities were evaluating the possibility of installing gender-neutral restrooms to accommodate and respect the rights of people with "different preferences". He also recalled that during the visit of representatives from the Organization of American States, this possibility was raised at the venues where the official meetings were held.

== Approval ==
The content of the law is an initiative of Congressman Alejandro Muñante, in collaboration with lawmakers Milagros Jáuregui, Jorge Montoya, Gladys Echaíz, José Cueto, Javier Padilla, Jorge Zeballos, Miguel Ciccia, Esdras Medina and Noelia Herrera.

The law was passed on 2 April 2025, following a debate in the plenary session of Congress and a vote of 104 in favor, 5 against, and 5 abstentions. It was published on 12 May 2025, in a special edition of the Legal Standards Bulletin of the official gazette El Peruano. It was enacted by the government of Dina Boluarte without any objections, which allowed for its immediate promulgation.

The law states:

5.1. Se prohíben el ingreso y el uso de los servicios sanitarios de uso público a toda persona cuyo sexo biológico no coincida con el sexo para el cual se ha destinado el referido servicio (...)

[5.1. Entry and use of public sanitation services are prohibited to any person whose biological sex does not coincide with the sex for which the service has been intended (...)]

Exceptions are only made for medical emergencies, accompanying people with disabilities, maintaining services, or complying with legal or judicial provisions. Likewise, public buildings are required to implement specific signage, usage protocols, and staff training under the supervision of municipal authorities.

Furthermore, the law amends Article 183 of the Penal Code and increases the penalties for indecent exposure in front of minors. It also establishes measures for the control and self-regulation of media and advertising to prevent the sexualization of minors. Therefore, it indirectly associates the use of restrooms according to gender identity with criminal activity, carrying penalties of two to four years in prison, and up to six years for the aggravating circumstance of doing so in the presence of minors.

== Response ==
Since its introduction as a bill in February 2025, the content of the legislation has been denounced by organizations that advocate for the rights of the trans community, arguing that it fails to respect gender identity in the use of restrooms and thus limits this population's access to leisure venues and other public spaces. Furthermore, it has been pointed out that the law violates the right to equality enshrined in Article 2.2 of the Peruvian Constitution and contravenes Article 323 of the Penal Code, which penalizes discrimination based on gender identity.

Several ministries did not support the bill. The Ministry of Women and Vulnerable Populations was consulted but did not issue an opinion, arguing that such a pronouncement fell under the purview of the Ministry of Justice and Human Rights. However, both the Ministry of Justice and Human Rights and the Ministry of Education deemed the legislation "viable with reservations", while the Ministry of Housing, Construction and Sanitation recommended that it be "re-evaluated". Meanwhile, several ultraconservative organizations, such as the Population Research Institute and the Person, Life, and Family Association, issued favorable opinions and campaigned in support of the law.

During the debate on the law, the Political Advocacy Committee was formed, composed of the organizations Asociación de Travestis, Transexuales y Transgéneros del Perú (ATTT), Transformar Perú, Empoderadxs, and Red Peruana TLGB. This committee submitted a letter to President Dina Boluarte requesting her review of the law. The letter was accompanied by a technical-legal report detailing various legal, technical, and public policy observations. The report was also sent to the Ministry of Women, the Ministry of Justice, and the Ombudsman's Office. Both the presidential office and the other agencies issued responses to the committee.

Following its approval, Congressman Guido Bellido questioned the application of the law, using as examples the trans comedians Dayanita and La Uchulú, who, according to the law, must use the men's restroom.

According to a report by the Institute for Democracy and Human Rights (IDEHPUCP), this law instrumentalizes the protection of children to legitimize transphobia and "criminalize trans people for using bathrooms that correspond to their gender identity".
