= Héctor Acuña (politician) =

Peruvian politician

Member of Congress
- In office 27 July 2021 – 26 July 2026
- Constituency: La Libertad

Personal details
- Born: Segundo Héctor Acuña Peralta; 8 April 1957 (age 69) Tacabamba, Peru
- Party: Honor and Democracy (since 2022)
- Other political affiliations: Alliance for Progress (2021–2022)
- Relatives: César Acuña (brother)

Segundo Héctor Acuña Peralta (born 8 April 1957) is a Peruvian civil engineer, businessman, and politician. He currently serves as a member of Congress for the 2021-2026 term, representing the department of La Libertad.

== Biography ==
He was born in the district of Tacabamba, province of Chota, Cajamarca. He is a member of a family with a strong presence in Peruvian public life; he is the brother of political leader César Acuña and former congressman Humberto Acuña. He trained as a civil engineer and developed his career in the private sector, holding management positions in various companies before his formal entry into parliamentary politics.

== Political career ==
In the 2021 Peruvian general election, he ran for Congress representing the La Libertad constituency with the Alliance for Progress (APP) party. He was elected after obtaining 19,729 preferential votes. In July 2022, he resigned from the APP caucus, citing internal disagreements. Subsequently, he joined various parliamentary groups, including Integrity and Development and Parliamentary Unity and Dialogue. He is currently a member of the Honor and Democracy caucus. During his legislative work, he served as chairman of the Budget and Public Accounts Committee (2021–2022) and the Culture and Cultural Heritage Committee (2023–2024).

On 18 February 2026, following the censure and removal of President José Jerí, Acuña was nominated by Honor and Democracy for President of Congress and for the presidency of Peru, but defeated in the first round to José María Balcázar.
