= Ruth Luque =

Peruvian lawyer and politician

Member of Senate
- Incumbent
- Assumed office 26 July 2026
- Constituency: Nationwide

Member of Congress
- In office 27 July 2021 – 26 July 2026
- Constituency: Cusco

Personal details
- Born: Ruth Luque Ibarra; 19 June 1979 (age 47) Santiago District, Cusco, Peru
- Party: Ahora Nación (since 2025)
- Other political affiliations: Broad Front (2015–2018); Together for Peru (2019–2022); New Peru for Good Living (2019–2024)
- Education: National University of Saint Anthony the Abbot in Cusco
- Occupation: Lawyer • Politician

Ruth Luque Ibarra (born 19 June 1979) is a Peruvian politician, lawyer and columnist. She has been a member of the Congress of Peru from the Cusco Province since 2021. She is a member of the New Peru for Good Living. Prior to entering politics, she was a columnist for Diario Uno.

In February 2026, Luque presented the first censure motion against President José Jerí.
