= Tania Pariona Tarqui =

Peruvian Quechua leader, social worker and politician

Tania Pariona MP
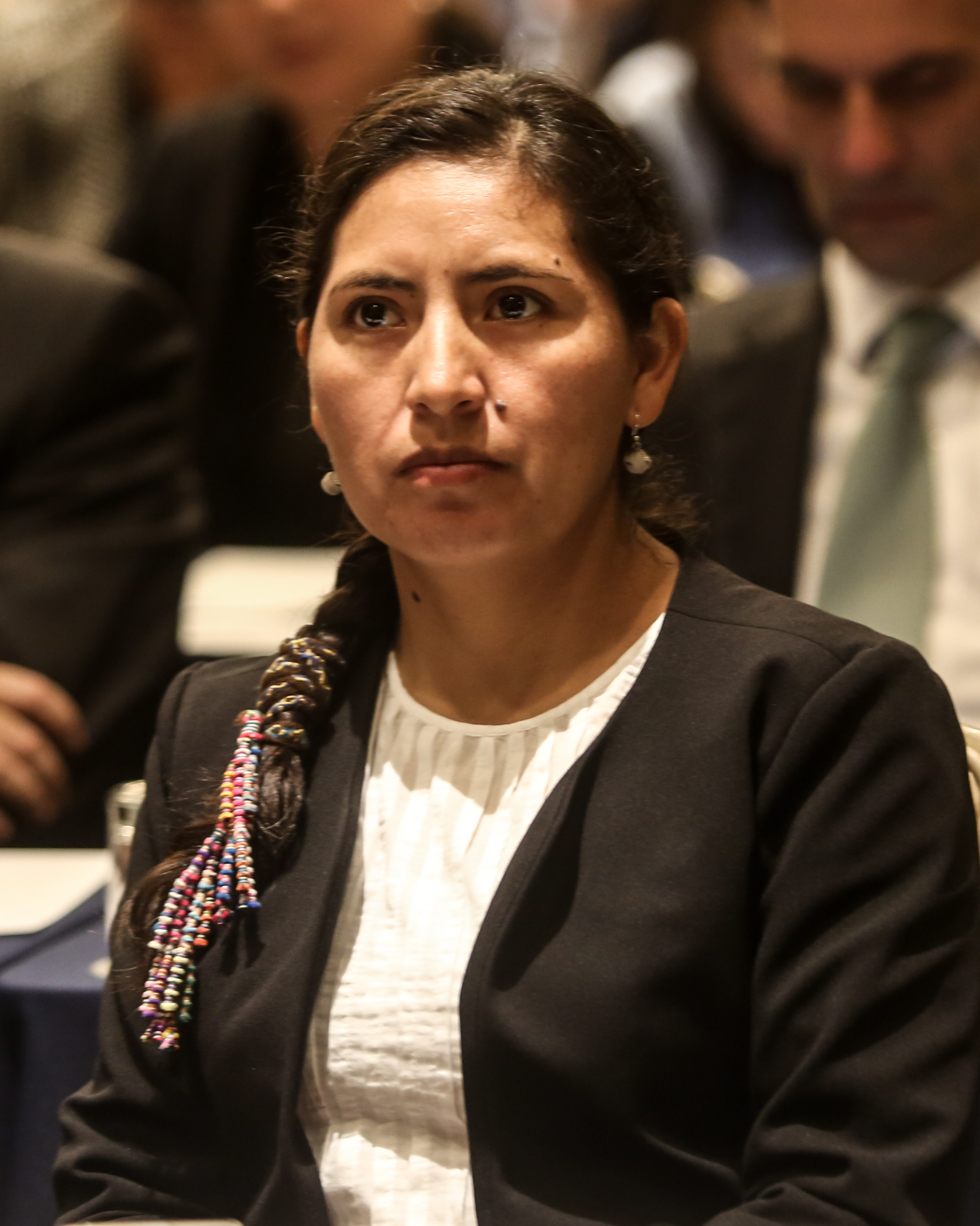

Member of the Congress of the Republic of Peru for Department of Ayacucho
- In office 26 July 2016 – 30 September 2019

Personal details
- Born: 1984 (age 41–42) Cayara District, Peru
- Party: Broad Front (2013-2017); Nuevo Perú (since 2017)
- Education: San Cristóbal of Huamanga University; Pontifical Catholic University of Peru
- Occupation: Politician and social worker
- Website: @TaniaPariona

Tania Pariona Tarqui (born 1984) is a Quechua leader, social worker, politician and human rights activist who represented the Department of Ayacucho in the Congress of the Republic of Peru. As an activist, she works largely to establish social equality for the Indigenous, youth and women. In 2016, she was elected to the Peruvian Congress by the Broad Front for Justice, Life and Freedom. In September 2017, she joined the New Peru bloc. On 15 August 2018, she became president of the Women and Family Commission of the Congress.

== Biography ==
Tania Pariona grew up in times convulsed by the terrorism of Shining Path in the city of Huamanga, but in her childhood she often went to her hometown of Cayara to help her grandparents. When she was four years old, soldiers of the Peruvian army killed 39 people in Cayara, after Shining Path killed four soldiers.

At 10 she met the Red Ñuqanchik, an organization of Quechua teenagers from Ayacucho linked to the indigenous association Chirapaq. She also collaborated in the National Movement of Organized Working Children and Adolescents of Peru (MNNATSOP) and represented it in October 2002 before the Childhood Commission of the Italian Chamber of Deputies.

In the Chirapaq organization she collaborated in several projects of indigenous youth and women nationally and internationally. She also participated in an international meeting of experts on indigenous issues at the headquarters of the UN in New York.

Tania Pariona studied Social Work at the San Cristóbal of Huamanga University, graduating in 2009, and then Human Development at the Pontifical Catholic University of Peru in Lima.

== Career as congresswoman ==
In 2016, she was elected in the department of Ayacucho for the Congress of the Republic of Peru by the Broad Front for Justice, Life and Freedom. Assuming her position as a congresswoman, she swore in Quechuan on July 22, 2016, For Cayara, Ayacucho and our Quechua, Aymara and Amazonian peoples. For their dignity and good living. Because we do not have terrorism of any kind, subversive or State. She usually wear a traditional Ayacucho costume to show her Quechua identity.

In her parliamentary work she has dedicated herself to the defense of the rights of indigenous and native peoples against mining companies, claiming the right to prior consultation, the human right to water and reparations for the victims of the armed conflict, also against impunity of the perpetrators of crimes at that time, including compulsory sterilization under Alberto Fujimori's government.

Since September 2017 she has been part of the New Peru bank. On 15 August 2018 she was elected president of the Ordinary Women and Family Commission of the Congress. Among her work objectives in the commission she pointed out the fight against violence towards women and feminicide in addition to effective equality between men and women.
