= Luisa Revilla =

Peruvian politician and LGBT activist (1971–2021)

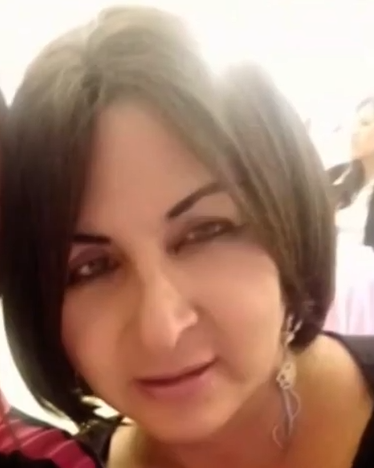

Member of the Provincial Council of Trujillo
- In office 1 January 2015 – 31 December 2018

Personal details
- Born: 12 October 1971; Trujillo, Peru
- Died: 15 April 2021 (aged 49); Trujillo, Peru
- Political party: MDSH

Luisa Revilla (12 October 1971 – 15 April 2021) was a Peruvian politician and LGBT activist. A member of the Movimiento Regional para el Desarrollo con Seguridad y Honradez (MDSH) party, she served as Provincial Mayor of Trujillo from 2015 to 2018.

== Biography ==
Born in Trujillo, Revilla ran for the Provincial Council of the municipality, becoming the first openly transgender person to become a councilor in Peru. She held this position until 2018.

During the 2017 Peru Census, Revilla's gender identity was respected and she was registered as a woman. That same year, on International Women's Day, Mayor of Trujillo Elidio Espinoza presented her with a medal from the Provincial Municipality of Trujillo to award her for her activism in the transgender community. She also participated in International LGBT Pride Day to support LGBT rights in Trujillo. In 2019, she was nominated for the Orden al Mérito de la Mujer.

Luisa Revilla died of COVID-19 on 15 April 2021, at the age of 49.
