= Esdras Medina =

Member of the Congress of Peru from Arequipa
- In office 27 July 2021 – 26 July 2026

Provincial Councilor of Arequipa
- In office 1 January 2015 – 31 December 2018

Personal details
- Born: Esdras Ricardo Medina Minaya; 25 March 1967 (age 59) Arequipa, Peru
- Party: Popular Renewal
- Education: National University of San Agustín
- Occupation: Politician, administrator

Esdras Ricardo Medina Minaya (born 25 March 1967) is a Peruvian politician and administrator. He has been a member of the Congress of Peru since 2021. He is a member of Popular Renewal. Medina served as the Provincial Councilor of Arequipa from 2015 until 2018.

== Personal life ==
Medina was born in Arequipa, Peru on 25 March 1967. He completed his primary studies at the Educational Center 40171 in Paucarpata District. In 1989, he studied administrative sciences at the National University of San Agustín.

== Career ==
For the 2021 general elections, Medina registered for Rafael López Aliaga's Popular Renewal and ran for Congress representing his native Arequipa. Medina managed to be elected with 15,693 votes.

In Parliament, he worked as president of the Education Commission and served as president of the Production, Micro and Small Enterprise Commission.

In July 2022, Medina was announced as a candidate for the presidency of the Congress, however he came in second place, losing to Lady Camones.

Medina presented one of the seven censure motions against President José Jerí that removed him from power in February 2026.
