= Article 272 of the Penal Code of Peru =

1863 law criminalizing homosexuality

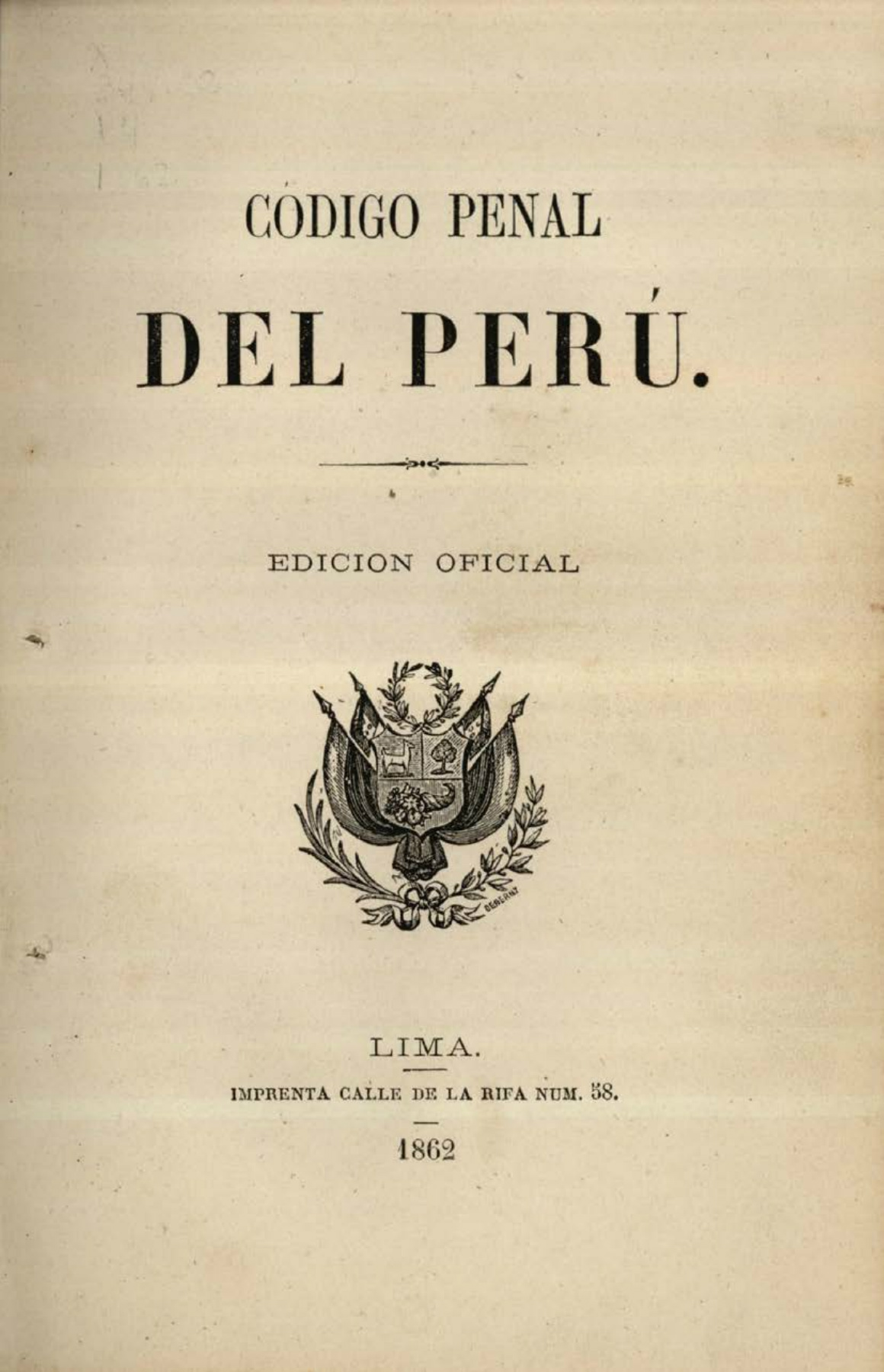
- Territorial extent: Peru
- Effective: March 10, 1863
- Repealed: July 27, 1924
- Status: Repealed

Article 272 of the Penal Code of Peru was an 1863 article of the Penal Code of Peru that criminalized homosexuality in Peru. On July 27, 1924, a new Penal Code was enacted that eliminated the crime of sodomy, thereby decriminalizing homosexuality.

== History ==
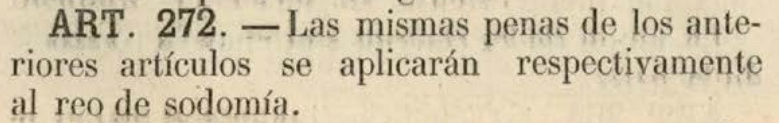
Excerpt from Article 272 of the Penal Code of 1863.

Following the independence of Peru from the peninsular dominion, the new Republic inherited the legislative corpus, or law, of the viceregal era; composed of the Siete Partidas, the Novísima Recopilación and the Compilation of Laws of the Indies, without a unified text. In these legal texts, homosexuality was explicitly stated as a crime and as a "nefarious sin." Likewise, homosexual behavior was repressed following the custom established by the Spanish Inquisition.

With the formation of the Peru–Bolivian Confederation Andrés de Santa Cruz imposed the Bolivian penal code on the new unified nation, but after its dissolution in 1839, the country was once again left without a single penal code. The Congress made efforts to legislate in this regard and appointed commissions to draft the normative body. The end result was the Penal Code of 1863, which was promulgated on March 10 of that year. According to Article 272, the person responsible for the crime of sodomy was punished with the same penalties imposed on those convicted of rape and statutory rape, which varied between 3 and 6 years in prison.

Art. 272. — The same penalties as in the previous articles shall apply respectively to the person guilty of sodomy.

— Penal Code of 1863

With the new century, jurists attempted to reform Peru's penal code, since the 1863 code suffered from gaps. It was not until 1924 that a new Penal Code was approved, during the Leguía Constitution. This new code consisted of 418 articles divided into 4 books, among which the crime of sodomy no longer explicitly appeared.

== See also ==
- LGBTQ rights in Peru
