= Sigrid Bazán =

Peruvian journalist

Sigrid Tesoro Bazán Narro
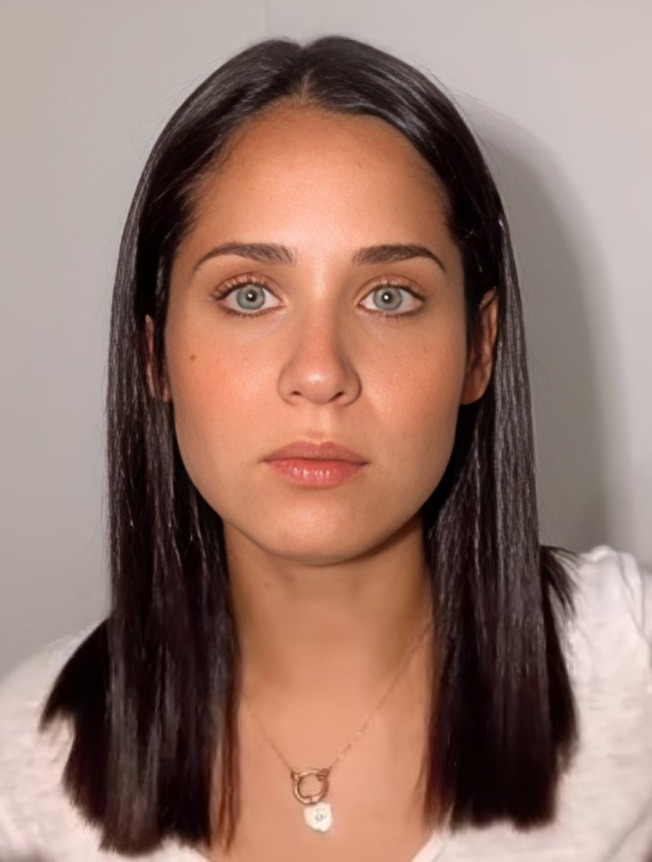

Member of Congress
- In office 27 July 2021 – 26 July 2026

Personal details
- Born: 27 September 1990 (age 35) Lima, Peru
- Party: New Peru
- Education: Pontifical Catholic University of Peru
- Profession: Lawyer, journalist, politician

Sigrid Tesoro Bazán Narro (born September 27, 1990) is a Peruvian journalist, political scientist, feminist activist, and politician. She worked as an announcer on Radio Exitosa, a news presenter on Latina Televisión and a columnist in the newspaper La República. She is currently a congresswoman of the Republic for the period 2021–2026.

She studied Political Science at the Pontificia Universidad Católica del Perú, where she was president of the Federation of University Students in 2012.

On December 18, 2021, Bazán published on her social networks that she tested positive for COVID-19. The parliamentarian expressed her gratitude to the Congressional health personnel who treated her, in addition to hoping to overcome the disease.
