= Honor and Democracy =

Political party in Peru

Honor and Democracy Honor y Democracia
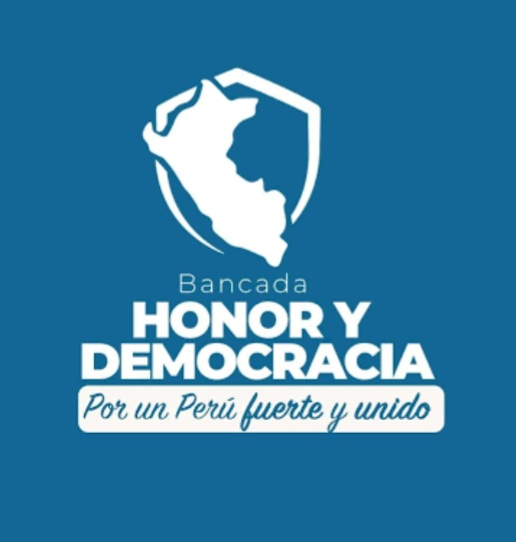
- Leader: Jorge Montoya Manrique
- Registered: 27 May 2024
- Ideology: Conservatism
- Political position: Right-wing
- Slogan: "For One Peru. Stronger and United"
- Congress: 5 / 130

Website
- www.facebook.com/@bancadahonorydemocracia/

Honor and Democracy (Spanish: Honor y Democracia) is a right-wing conservative parliamentary grouping of the Congress of the Republic of Peru.

== Background ==
The group was formed on May 27, 2024, by Congressman Jorge Montoya Manrique, who defected from the Popular Renewal bench. Other defectors from Popular Renewal who joined Montoya Marique included José Cueto, Gladys Echaíz and Héctor Acuña.

== Members ==
Name	Constituency
Jorge Montoya	Lima
José Cueto	Lima
Gladys Echaíz	Lima
Javier Padilla	Lima Provincias
Héctor Acuña	La Libertad
