= Verónika Mendoza =

Peruvian politician

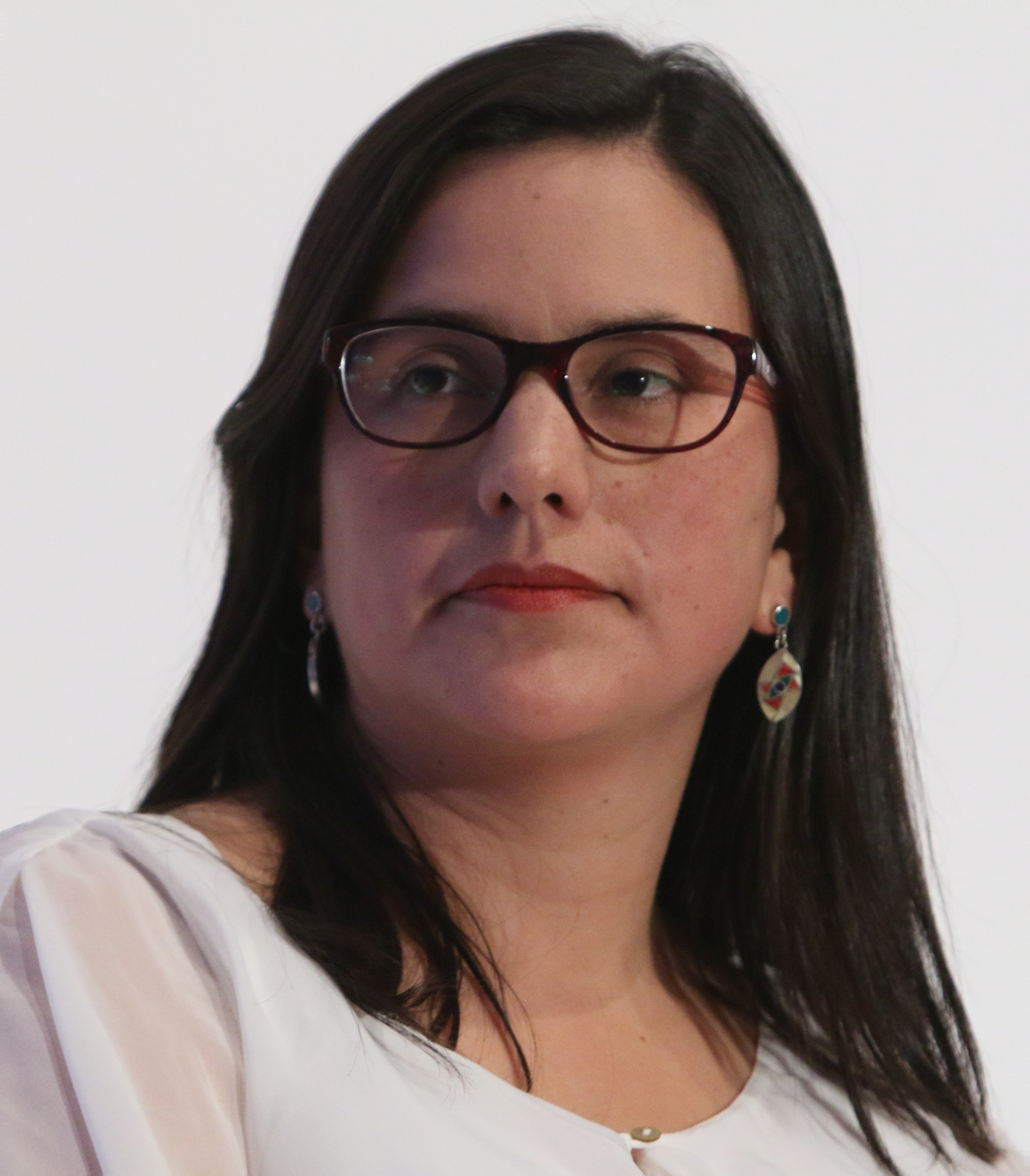

President of New Peru
- Incumbent
- Assumed office 11 December 2017
- Preceded by: Office established

Member of Congress
- In office 25 July 2011 – 26 July 2016
- Constituency: Cusco

Personal details
- Born: 9 December 1980 (age 45) San Sebastián, Peru
- Party: New Peru (2017–present)
- Other political affiliations: Nationalist Party (2009–2012); Broad Front (2015–2018); Together for Peru (2020–2021)
- Education: Paris Diderot University (BS); Sorbonne Nouvelle University (MSc); National University of Distance Education (MA)
- Website: Official website

Verónika Fanny Mendoza Frisch (Spanish pronunciation: [beˌɾonika ˌfanni menˌdosa ˈfɾist͡ʃ]; born 9 December 1980) is a Peruvian psychologist, educator, and politician. She is the founder and current leader of the New Peru movement.

Born in Cuzco to a Peruvian father and French mother, Mendoza pursued her education in Paris, France, majoring in psychology at the Paris Diderot University. She continued her graduate education at the New Sorbonne University, attaining a master's in social sciences. Upon the completion of her graduate education abroad, she established back in Peru in order to start a career in politics.

Initially a member of the Peruvian Nationalist Party, Mendoza was elected to the Peruvian Congress in 2011. Representing the constituency of Cuzco, she quit the Nationalist caucus in 2012 in order to start her own political party, the Sowing Movement. Subsequently, she agreed in constituting the Broad Front coalition. Announcing her candidacy for President of Peru at the 2016 general election, she easily attained the coalition's presidential nomination. She placed third in the election, while her opponents Keiko Fujimori and Pedro Pablo Kuczynski qualified to the second round, in which Kuczynski was elected with her endorsement in order to avoid a Fujimori win. Following the election, the Broad Front caucus divided into two factions, prompting the foundation of New Peru in December 2017, with Mendoza as its leader.

For the 2021 general election, Mendoza was unable to register New Peru, prompting her to reach an agreement with Together for Peru in order to run for the presidency for a second time. Confirmed as the coalition's presidential nominee, Mendoza failed to qualify for the run-off a second time, as she placed sixth in the election with 7.9% of the popular vote. Her loss in support throughout the campaign is widely credited to Pedro Castillo and Yonhy Lescano's voting share in the south of Peru, a traditional stronghold for the Peruvian left.

== Early life ==
Verónika Mendoza was born on 9 December 1980 in the San Sebastián district of Cusco Province, in Peru’s southern Andean highlands. She is the daughter of Marcelino Mendoza and Gabrielle Marie Frisch D'Adhemar, a French citizen. Owing to her mother’s nationality, Mendoza holds both Peruvian and French nationalities.

She studied at the Virgen del Carmen school in the city of Cusco and the Université Paris Diderot, in Paris, France, from which she graduated with a degree in Psychology in 2003. Subsequently, she received a Master’s Degree in Social Sciences from the New Sorbonne University in 2006, and then a Master’s Degree in Education, with an emphasis on Spanish language, from Madrid’s Universidad Nacional de Educación a Distancia, in 2009. Mendoza also speaks Quechua, an indigenous and official language of Peru.

Mendoza worked as a Spanish-language instructor at the Centre Acadomia Prépa Paris. Later, she served as an instructor at the Asociación Pukllasunchis in Cusco, and as a professor at the Universidad Nacional del Altiplano de Puno.

== Political career ==
While studying in Europe, Mendoza became more involved in activism and politics, eventually joining the Peruvian Nationalist Party. In Peru, she was appointed the party youth’s press secretary in 2009, and as spokesperson for the party’s women’s commission the following year.

=== Congress of Peru ===
In the 2011 Peruvian general elections she ran for Congress, in representation of Cusco, on the Gana Perú coalition’s ticket. She was elected to the office with 47,088 votes. Her term expired in July 2016. She was later named Vice President of the Peruvian Congress’ Committee for Culture and Cultural Heritage. She was also a member of the Congressional Commission on Andean, Amazonian, and Afro-Peruvian Peoples, the Environment, and Ecology. Mendoza is a member of the Campaign in Defense of Water and Territory.

She has served the head of the Cusco Congressional delegation. She resigned from the Gana Perú Congressional delegation on 4 June 2012, following repression of protesters and strikers in Espinar Province. Mendoza said she distanced herself from Humala's government, stating "I parted ways with the movement a year into Ollanta Humala’s term, when he quickly betrayed the ideals for which he had been elected. From that moment onward, myself and others set out to find a vehicle that could include the people and organizations making up the diverse Peruvian left." Shortly thereafter, she helped create the Broad Front coalition of left-wing parties, trade unions and other organizations.

=== 2016 presidential run ===
After winning the party's primary elections in October 2015, Mendoza became the Broad Front's (Frente Amplio) candidate in the 2016 presidential election. She finished third in that contest, with 2.8 million (18.8%) valid votes cast in her favor.

She was later elected to be the president of the New Peru party on 11 December 2017 when the party was founded.

=== 2021 presidential run ===
On 4 November 2020, the 240th anniversary of the rebellion of Túpac Amaru II, Mendoza announced her pre-candidacy with the Together for Peru coalition for the 2021 Peruvian presidential election. Leading up to her candidacy, Mendoza criticized the response to the COVID-19 pandemic in Peru, stating "COVID-19 is showing us many of the country's underlying problems: thousands of families and schools that do not have drinking water, thousands of workers who do not have health insurance, who cannot stop working for a single day because your family's food depends on that, an abandoned public health, of course, we only dedicate 2.3% of GDP to public health, below the average for Latin America which is 4% and well below 6% recommended by the WHO".

Controversy arose in February 2021 after newspaper Perú.21 published an article alleging that Mendoza did not disclose ownership of a property shared with her sisters in Cusco. The Special Electoral Juries (JEE) responded by saying they would investigate the matter.

Though she was initially seen as a frontrunner for the presidential election, Mendoza did not receive substantial support among average voters, with her main voting base being among the educated middle class.

== Ideology and views ==
The left has to be in touch with reality, not abstracted by dogmatisms, ... It has to be connected to the people, ready to adapt to their needs.

— Verónika Mendoza

Mendoza has called for a new left-wing movement in Latin America that promotes private investment in public life. She has advocated for a new constitution in Peru, diversifying its economy away from what is primarily mining, strengthening rights for women, LGBT and indigenous groups, providing free access to water and establishing stronger environmental protections. In an interview with Jacobin, she said that she wanted to strengthen Peru's sovereignty and move away from an informal economy, saying such an economy is where "individual concerns understandably trump relationships with neighbors, coworkers" and that it "is also fertile ground for neoliberals ... exploiting the legitimate fears that people experience in the midst of generalized uncertainty".

Regarding her views on leftist movements in the region, she criticized them stating "the Left hasn’t been able to forge a viable political project that includes everyone equally, without discrimination". When discussing the political processes of the left in Bolivia and Chile, Mendoza stated that Peru needed its "own path". Her movement has also distanced itself from the policies of Hugo Chávez and Nicolás Maduro in Venezuela, describing their administrations as "caudillismo" and anti-democratic. She has called for the safeguard of human rights in Venezuela, condemning the actions of the Maduro government.

She also supported the anti-corruption measures of President Martín Vizcarra, such as the 2018 Peruvian constitutional referendum.

== Recognition ==
Americas Quarterly recognized Mendoza in their Top 5 Politicians Under 40 article, with the publication saying that she was "stoking hopes that a modern, more electable left may be taking root in Peru".

== Electoral history ==
=== Executive ===
Election	Office	List	Votes			Result	Ref.
Election	Office	List	Total	%	P.	Result	Ref.
2016	President of Peru	Broad Front	2,874,940	18.74%	3rd	Not elected	
2021	President of Peru	Together for Peru	1,132,577	7.87%	6th	Not elected	

=== Legislative ===
Election	Office	List	#	District	Votes			Result	Ref.
Election	Office	List	#	District	Total	%	P.	Result	Ref.
2011	Member of Congress	Peru Wins	1	Cuzco	47,088	53.64%	1st (Note: Presented on an electoral list. The data shown represents the share of the vote the entire party/alliance received in that constituency.)	Elected	
