= New Peru for Good Living =

Political party in Peru

New Peru for Good Living Nuevo Perú por el Buen Vivir
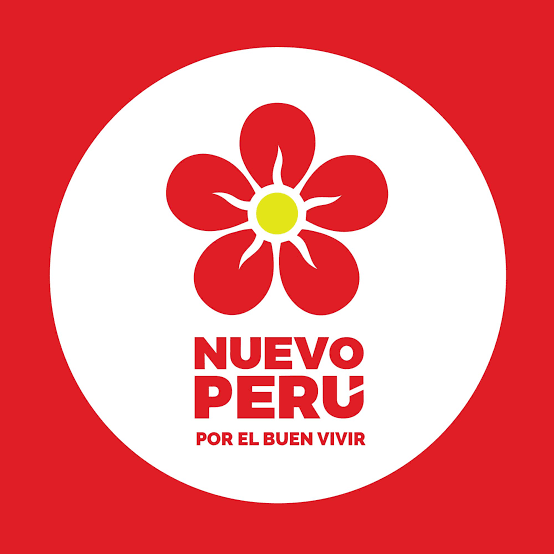
- Abbreviation: NP
- President: Verónika Mendoza
- Secretary-General: Álvaro Campana
- Founded: 9 December 2017
- Split from: Broad Front
- Headquarters: Plaza Bolognesi 590, Lima
- Ideology: Democratic socialism Progressivism; Mariáteguism; Anti-Fujimorism
- Political position: Left-wing
- Colors: Garnet Red
- Seats in the Congress: 0 / 130

Website
- www.nuevoperu.pe

New Peru for Good Living (Spanish: Nuevo Perú por el Buen Vivir) is a left-wing Peruvian political party founded in 2017 as a splinter caucus of the Broad Front for the 2016–2019 Peruvian Congress. It has embraced socialism and some of the ideologies of José Carlos Mariátegui, a Peruvian Marxist.

== History ==
The party was informally founded on 9 December 2017 in Metropolitan Lima. The current President is Verónika Mendoza and the current Secretary-General is Álvaro Campana.

The spokesperson for New Peru is Edgar Ochoa. New Peru had 10 seats in the Congress of the Republic of Peru who separated from the Broad Front coalition upon its formation. The group was legally recognized in September 2017. The movement is in the process of being registered as a political party to formally participate in the 2021 general election.

At the legislative elections held on 26 January 2020, the party ran allied with the Together for Peru coalition as its party registration was still pending. The exit polls gave the alliance 4.8% of the popular vote but no seats in the Congress of the Republic, as they failed to pass the electoral threshold. For the 2021 general election, Mendoza was unable to register New Peru, prompting her to reach an agreement with Together for Peru in order to run for the presidency for a second time. Confirmed as the coalition's presidential nominee, Mendoza failed to qualify for the run-off a second time, as she placed sixth in the election with 7.9% of the popular vote. Her loss in support throughout the campaign is widely credited to Pedro Castillo and Yonhy Lescano's voting share in the south of Peru, a traditional stronghold for the Peruvian left.

== Ideology and views ==
In New Peru's party documents, they describe the organization as "socialist, feminist, environmentalist, diverse and intercultural". According to party president Verónika Mendoza, New Peru is "part of a long socialist tradition that began with the Peruvian Marxist José Carlos Mariátegui in the 1920s", and that the party distanced itself from "ideologism and authoritarianism that has, where it appeared, isolated the Left". New Peru advocates for equal rights, the respect for diversity, protection of nature and sustainability that is achieved through a decentralized system which utilizes multiple viewpoints.

=== Ten Axes ===
The party holds ten guidelines that it says will help create a new Peru:

1. A new culture for good living – Advocates for improved relations between all Peruvians, the respect of nature and sustainable practices.
2. A new democracy and a new state – The creation of a new constitution, the decentralization of government to enhance citizen participation and to remove large financiers from politics.
3. A new economy at the service of the people and the country – Increasing economic diversity away from being reliant on raw materials, to retake the sovereignty of economic properties of Peru from external competition, to strengthen the country's infrastructure and a more fair tax system.
4. Decent work and social security for all – Establishing comprehensive labor rights, creating productive jobs away from an informal economy and social security for all Peruvians, including the self-employed.
5. Equality in diversity – To eliminate discrimination against, to value and to adapt laws for the acceptation of women, LGBTIQ individuals, indigenous groups, Afro-Peruvians and those with different abilities and ages.
6. Sustainable management of territories, protection of nature and the fight against global warming – Building a sustainable culture through recognizing climate change, protecting all ecosystems, utilizing clean energy, practicing responsible land-use and enhancing interaction between urban and rural areas.
7. Indigenous peoples with autonomy, territory and political participation – The creation of laws to recognize the autonomy of indigenous peoples, to promote their inclusion in Peru's society and the recognition of their cultural identities.
8. Public services to guarantee rights: justice and security, education, health – Improved security services that emphasizes the involvement of citizens, a reformed justice system to reward honesty and condemn corruption and a jail system that works in a timely and proportional manner. Education should be free, high-quality, universal and inclusive, with higher education being restructured and regulated to prevent fraud and enhance standards. Regarding the health of Peruvians, the country should utilize universal health care that focuses on preventing disease, the continuous education and evaluation of healthcare professionals and reproductive rights for women that includes access to contraceptives and voluntary abortions.
9. Cultural policies for good living – Promoting a friendly relationship between cultural groups and nature, while safeguarding the labor and practices of Andean and Amazonian peoples.
10. Regional and global integration with sovereignty and solidarity of the peoples – The prevention of foreign military bases, the creation of equitable trade agreements and the improvement of Latin American and indigenous integration.

== Election results ==
=== Presidential election ===
Year	Candidate	Party / Coalition	Votes	Percentage	Outcome
2021	Verónika Mendoza	Together for Peru	1,132,577	7.86	6th

=== Congressional elections ===
Year	Votes	%	Seats	▲/▼	Position
2020	710 462 as part of Together for Peru	4.8%	0 / 130	▼10	N/A
2021	847,570 as part of Together for Peru. Only 2 from New Peru	6.59	5 / 130	▲2	Minority
