= Together for Peru =

Political party in Peru

Together for Peru Juntos por el Perú
- Abbreviation: JP
- President: Roberto Sánchez
- Secretary-General: Ernesto Zunini
- Spokesperson: Paul Percy Fernández Bravo; Saúl Armacanqui
- Founded: 22 May 2017
- Membership (2026): 55,567
- Ideology: Anti-Fujimorism; Anti-neoliberalism; Democratic socialism; Progressivism; Decentralization (Peru)
- Political position: Centre-left to left-wing
- Colors: Green, Red
- Chamber of Deputies: 31 / 130
- Senate: 14 / 60
- Governorships: 0 / 25
- Regional Councillors: 8 / 274
- Province Mayorships: 4 / 196
- District Mayorships: 39 / 1,874

Website
- jp.org.pe

Together for Peru (Spanish: Juntos por el Perú, JP) is a Peruvian centre-left to left-wing political party founded with the incumbent registration of the Peruvian Humanist Party.

Initially formed as a coalition, it participated in the 2021 general election with New Peru's leader, Verónika Mendoza, as presidential nominee. In the aftermath of the unsuccessful presidential run, the coalition endorsed Pedro Castillo's nomination in the runoff against Keiko Fujimori.

Upon the proclamation of Castillo's victory, Together for Peru was invited to join the new left-wing government led by Free Peru. The coalition sat as a junior member of Castillo's administration by holding two cabinet positions, the most prominent being the Ministry of Foreign Trade and Tourism, which was occupied by the coalition's president, Roberto Sánchez.

== History ==
The Together for Peru coalition was founded in 2017 and officially registered as a party by changing the name of the Peruvian Humanist Party instead of registering all of the parties, thus informally composing the union. Alongside Broad Front, both coalitions remain the largest active left-wing coalitions in Peru

=== 2020 snap congressional elections ===
At the legislative elections held on 26 January 2020, the party won 4.8% of the popular vote but no seats in the Congress of the Republic. Although, the first projections gave the coalition approximately 5.0% within the margin of error, the party failed to get past the electoral threshold in order to attain representation. In this election, the coalition ran allied informally with the New Peru party led by Verónika Mendoza, as the latter organization did not meet the requirements for party registration.

=== 2021 general elections ===
For the 2021 general election, the coalition chose Verónika Mendoza to run in presidential elections, partnering again with New Peru. For congress, the coalition had 130 individuals selected to participate, with the leader Roberto Sánchez choosing to run for being the congressman of Lima. Together for Peru also proposed the inclusion of a referendum in the elections to ask Peruvians if they want a new constitution. Eventually, Mendoza placed sixth in the election with 7.9% of the popular vote. Her loss in support throughout the campaign is widely credited to Pedro Castillo and Yonhy Lescano's voting share in the south of Peru, a traditional stronghold for the Peruvian left. However, in the congressional election, the coalition won 6.6% of the popular vote and gained 5 seats in Congress.

=== 2026 general elections ===
For the 2026 general elections, the party chose Roberto Sánchez to be its nominee. Sanchez serves as the party's president and is a former Castillo cabinet minister. Sanchez advanced to the second round, and Together for Peru placed second in seats in both houses of Congress. In June 2026, Sanchez was defeated by Keiko Fujimori of Popular Force.

== National Executive Committee ==
The National Executive Committee is headed by Roberto Sánchez, a former member of the Humanist Party. Provided by the Party Statue, the composition of the National Executive Committee as of July 2026 is:

- President: Roberto Sánchez
- National General Secretary: Ernesto Zunini
- National Secretary of Decentralisation and State Reform: Branly Alberto Morales Rosas
- National Secretary of Trade Union and Guild Affairs: Janet Patricia Marin Rivera
- National Secretary of Communication and Press: Matusael Zambrano Sandoval
- National Secretary of Human and Social Development: Marissa Lisset Ponce Godiño
- National Secretary of Economy: Luzmila Yalu Ayay Casas
- National Secretary of United Front and Electoral Affairs: Walter Amílcar Flores Choco
- National Secretary of Ideology, Doctrine and Political Formation: Wilfredo Verano Saravia
- National Secretary of Youths and University Commandos: Tatiana Soledad Flores Yauri
- National Secretary of Social Mobilisation: Remigio Condori Flores
- National Secretary of Organisation and Planning: Kelly Esther Avendaño Roca
- National Secretary of Government Plan and Professional Commandos: Giannina Iris Avendaño Vilca
- National Secretary of Social Media and Digital Media: Jessica Roxana Guevara Ramírez
- National Secretary of International Relations: Diogenes Zenon Alvarado Collens
- National Secretary of Women and Vulnerable Populations: Ada Margarita Franco Nestares
- National Secretary of Micro, Small, and Medium-Sized Enterprises and Entrepreneurs: Keyla Denis Ponce Loloy
- Organic Spokesperson: Paul Percy Fernández Bravo
- Political Spokesperson: Saúl Armacanqui

== Ideology and positions ==
Together for Peru groups a broad part of the Peruvian left-wing parties that believe that neoliberalism and the current "neoliberal" constitution resulted with poverty and inequality in Peru. Overall, Together for Peru leans towards democratic socialism according to EFE. They describe their principles as ensuring equality and equity of all Peruvians, calling for a multicultural society, respecting nature through sustainability and improving tolerance among social groups. The coalition promotes the decentralization of the national government and seeks regional governments to have more authority to increase citizen representation and progressivism.

Some of the party members consider that Venezuela "is not governed by a dictatorship," taking pro-Maduro positions. However, in particular Verónika Mendoza, leader of New Peru, has expressed: Yes, I can say that Venezuela is a dictatorship. Although I recognize that in New Peru there are different stances. Likewise, Mendoza has declared that "our solidarity is not with Maduro, but with Venezuelans."

Its symbol has red lettering representing Peru's national color and the color of leftist parties while the green represents nature and life.

== Controversies and Internal Disputes ==
=== Party disputes during the 2021 general election ===
Together for Peru has experienced several internal disputes and factional divisions throughout its history. Following the 2021 general election, disagreements over the party's political direction and leadership led to internal conflicts between competing factions. These tensions resulted in a series of resignations and party splits, including the departure of prominent members and allied groups, contributing to a period of organizational instability and restructuring within the party.

During the 2021 and 2026 general election campaign, some political opponents and commentators drew comparisons between Together for Peru and the Venezuelan political model due to statements made by party figures regarding the situation in Venezuela. The party rejected such comparisons, and presidential candidate Verónika Mendoza later stated that Venezuela was a dictatorship and criticized the government of Nicolás Maduro.

=== Controversial alliances ===
The party faced criticism over attempts to establish political alliances with Antauro Humala, brother of former president Ollanta Humala and former leader of the Ethnocacerist movement, which carried out an armed uprising in the Andahuaylas province against the government of President Alejandro Toledo in 2005.

The party's association with the presidency of Pedro Castillo also generated controversy. Although Castillo was elected as a member of Free Peru, Together for Peru supported parts of his administration and was considered part of the broader left-wing coalition backing his government. Following Castillo's attempted self-coup on 7 December 2022, opponents criticized the party for its previous support of the administration, while party members expressed differing views regarding the political crisis and Castillo's actions.

=== Claims of electoral fraud during the 2026 general election ===
In the closing days of the second round during the 2026 general elections, Together for Peru candidate and party leader Roberto Sanchez and his running mate Brigida Curo alleged that the second round of the election had been fraudulent. Sanchez demanded that the National Office of Electoral Processes (ONPE) conduct a recount and asked the National Jury of Elections (JNE) to annul ballots cast by Peruvians abroad, which had given his opponent Keiko Fujimori the lead and eventual victory in the race.

Electoral authorities rejected the requests, and Sanchez announced that he would not recognize the government of Fujimori and instead called for a national march against the results of the second round. Electoral observers from Peru, the European Union, and the United States reported that they had found no evidence of significant irregularities affecting the outcome of the election.

=== Controversial remarks ===
The party also faced criticism after a video surfaced showing vice-presidential candidate Brígida Curo stating that "the Japanese woman should go back to her country" in reference to her opponent Keiko Fujimori, a Peruvian of Nikkei descent. Together for Peru and fact checkers defended Curo and argued that the video had been taken out of context.

== Election results ==
=== Presidential election ===
Election	Candidate	First round		Second round		Result
Election	Candidate	Votes	%	Votes	%	Result
2021	Verónika Mendoza	1,132,577	7.86			Lost ✗
2026	Roberto Sánchez	2,015,114	17.18	9,173,755	49.87	Lost ✗

=== Congressional elections ===
==== Unicameral Congress of the Republic ====
Year	Votes	%	Seats	▲/▼	Position
2020	710,462	4.80	0 / 130	Steady	Extra-parliamentary
2021	847,570	6.59	5 / 130	▲5	Opposition

==== Chamber of Deputies ====
Election	Leader	Votes	%	Seats	+/–	Rank	Government
2026	Roberto Sánchez	1,553,154	11.04	32 / 130	▲27	▲2nd	Opposition

==== Senate ====
Election	Leader	Votes	%	Seats	+/–	Rank	Government
2026	Roberto Sánchez	1,808,783	12.23	14 / 60		▲2nd	Opposition

=== Regional and municipal elections ===
Year	Regional government	Provincial mayors	District mayors
Year	Outcome	Outcome	Outcome
2018	0 / 25	0 / 196	10 / 1,874
2022	0 / 25	4 / 196	38 / 1,874
2026	0 / 25	0 / 196	0 / 1,874
