= Pedro Castillo =

President of Peru from 2021 to 2022

Pedro Castillo OSP OCA
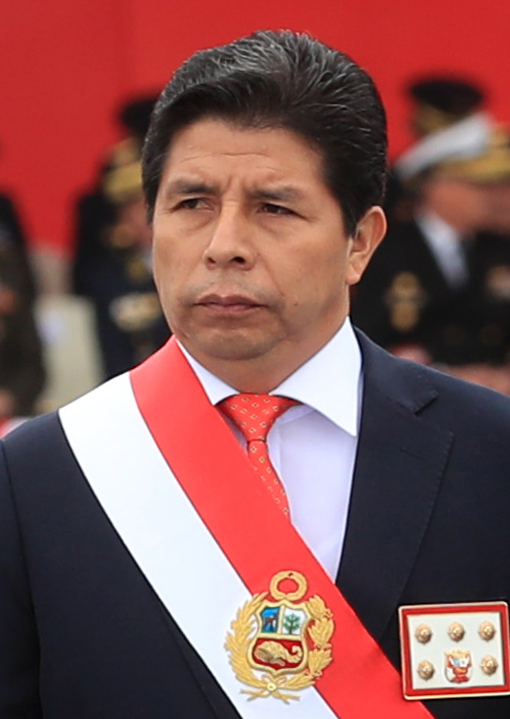
- Castillo in 2022

President of Peru
- In office 28 July 2021 – 7 December 2022
- Prime Minister: See list: Guido Bellido Mirtha Vásquez Héctor Valer Aníbal Torres Betssy Chávez
- Vice President: First Vice President; Dina Boluarte; Second Vice President; Vacant (Note: Vladimir Cerrón was his second vice presidential candidate; however, he was excluded from campaign after being deemed ineligible by the National Jury of Elections due to Cerrón's conviction on corruption charges.)
- Preceded by: Francisco Sagasti
- Succeeded by: Dina Boluarte

Personal details
- Born: José Pedro Castillo Terrones; 19 October 1969 (age 57) Puña, Peru
- Party: Everything with the People (since 2024)
- Other political affiliations: Possible Peru (2002–2017); Free Peru (2020–2022); Independent (until 2002, 2017–2020, 2022–2024)
- Spouse: Lilia Paredes (m. 2000)
- Children: 2
- Relatives: Yenifer Paredes (sister-in-law); Mercedes Castillo (brother)
- Education: César Vallejo University (BA, MA)
- Criminal information
- Status: Incarcerated at Barbadillo Prison
- Criminal charges: Rebellion, conspiracy against the state
- Penalty: 11.5 years in prison

José Pedro Castillo Terrones (Latin American Spanish: [xoˈse ˈpeðɾo kasˈtiʝo teˈrones]; born 19 October 1969) is a Peruvian politician, former elementary school teacher, and union leader who served as the president of Peru from 28 July 2021 until he was removed from office after attempting a self-coup on 7 December 2022.

Born to a peasant family in Puña, Cajamarca, Castillo began working in Peru's informal economy as a teenager to earn funds for his studies in education and later returned to his hometown to become a primary school teacher. He began his political life in the Peru Posible party, for which he unsuccessfully ran for mayor of Anguía in 2002. He was part of the movement Don't Mess With My Children (CMHNTM). He attained political prominence as a leading figure in a school teachers' strike in 2017. He ran in the 2021 presidential election as the candidate of the socialist Free Peru party. Castillo announced his presidential candidacy after seeing his students undergo hardships from the lack of resources in rural Peru, with the election occurring amidst the country's COVID-19 pandemic and a period of democratic deterioration in the nation. With the support of individuals living in rural and outlying provinces, he placed first in the initial round of the presidential vote and advanced to the second round where he won against his opponent Keiko Fujimori. Castillo's victory in the presidential race was confirmed on 19 July 2021 and he was inaugurated on 28 July.

Characterised as left-wing conservative, Castillo's ideology merged left-wing populist economics with socially conservative views. After taking office, Castillo named far-left and left-wing cabinets, due to the influence of Free Peru leader Vladimir Cerrón and other more left-wing politicians. Later on in his presidency, Castillo ultimately began to align his policies with Congress and Evangelical groups on social issues, including his opposition to same-sex marriage, gender studies and sex education. He left the Free Peru party in June 2022 to govern as an independent. In attempts to appease the right-wing Congress, he later appointed members of center and center-right political parties as ministers of state. Castillo was noted for appointing four different governments in six months, a Peruvian record.

Castillo's presidency had a minority in Congress, and faced opposition which led to three impeachment proceedings, although the first two failed to reach the necessary votes to remove him from office. Following the second failed impeachment vote in March 2022, protests took place across the country against high fuel and fertilizer prices caused by the Russian invasion of Ukraine and sanctions against Russia. Mining protests also intensified as the country's economy plummeted. On 1 December 2022, Peru's Congress approved a motion initiated by opposition lawmakers to start the third formal attempt to impeach Castillo.

On 7 December 2022, Castillo, facing imminent impeachment proceedings, attempted a self-coup, tried to form a provisional government, instituted a national curfew, and called for the formation of an assembly to draft a new constitution. Castillo was impeached by Congress within the day and was detained for sedition and high treason. He was succeeded by First Vice President Dina Boluarte. After his removal, pro-Castillo protests broke out calling for new elections and Castillo's release, leading Boluarte to align herself with the opposition to Castillo. His trial began in March 2025 and on 27 November he was sentenced to 11 years in prison.

== Early life and education ==
Castillo was born to an impoverished and illiterate peasant family in Puña, Tacabamba, Chota Province, Department of Cajamarca. Despite being the location of South America's largest gold mine, Cajamarca has remained one of the poorest regions in Peru. He is the third of nine children.

His father, Ireño Castillo, was born on the hacienda of a landowning family where he performed labor-intensive work. His family rented land from the landowners until General Juan Velasco Alvarado took power and redistributed property from landowners to peasants, with Ireño receiving a plot of land he had been working on. As a child, Castillo balanced his schooling with farm work at home, completing his elementary and high school education at the Octavio Matta Contreras de Cutervo Higher Pedagogical Institute. Castillo's daily trek to and from school involved walking along steep cliffside paths for two hours.

"It was a great accomplishment for me to finish high school, which I did thanks to the help of my parents and my brothers and sisters. I continued my education, doing what I could to earn a living. I worked in the coffee fields. I came to Lima to sell newspapers. I sold ice cream. I cleaned toilets in hotels. I saw the harsh reality for workers in the countryside and the city."

— Pedro Castillo, June 2021

As a teenager and young adult, Castillo traveled throughout Peru to earn funds for his studies. Beginning at the age of twelve, each year he and his father walked 140 kilometres (87 mi) for seasonal work in the coffee plantations of the Peruvian Amazonia. Castillo also claims to have sold ice cream and newspapers and cleaned hotels in Lima. He studied Primary Education at the Octavio Carrera Education Institute of Superior Studies and gained a master's degree in Educational Psychology from the César Vallejo University.

During the internal conflict in Peru that began in the 1980s, Castillo worked in his youth as a patrolman of Rondas campesinas to defend against the Shining Path.

From 1995, Castillo worked as a primary school teacher and principal at School 10465 in the town of Puña, Chota. In addition to teaching, he was responsible for cooking for his students and cleaning their classroom. According to Castillo, the community constructed the school after receiving no government assistance. Rural teaching in Peru is poorly paid but highly respected and influential within local communities, which led Castillo to become involved with teachers' unions. With his working background as a patrolman for Rondas campesinas and being a schoolteacher, two of the most respected jobs in Peruvian society, Castillo was able to establish a high level of political support.

== Early political career ==
In 2002, Castillo unsuccessfully ran for the mayorship of Anguía as the representative of Alejandro Toledo's centre-left party Possible Peru. He served as a leading member of the party in Cajamarca from 2005 until the party's dissolution in 2017 following its poor results in the 2016 Peruvian general election. Following his leadership during the teachers' strike, numerous political parties in Peru approached Castillo to promote him as a congressional candidate, though he refused and instead decided to run for the presidency after encouragement from unions.

=== 2017 teachers' strike ===
In an interview with the Associated Press, Castillo said that his motivation for entering politics was seeing his students arrive to school hungry without any benefits while, at the same time, Peru experienced economic growth from mineral wealth. Castillo became a teachers' union leader during the 2017 Peru teachers' strike, which sought to increase salaries, pay off local government debt, repeal the Law of the Public Teacher Career and increase the education budget. At the time, the Peruvian government sought to replace a system of career teachers with temporary unskilled educators. The strikes spread through southern Peru; due to their longevity, Minister of Education Marilú Martens, Prime Minister Fernando Zavala, and other government officials jointly announced a package of salary increases and debt relief, though the teachers remained on strike.

President Pedro Pablo Kuczynski offered to mediate, inviting the teachers' delegates to meet at the Government Palace to reach a solution; only the leaders of the union's executive committee and its Cuzco leaders were received while representatives of the regions led by Castillo were excluded. The strike consequently worsened as teachers from across Peru travelled to Lima to hold marches and rallies in the capital. Keiko Fujimori and her Fujimorist supporters, who were opponents of the Kuczynski administration, assisted Castillo with the strike in an effort to destabilize the president's government.

On 24 August 2017, the government issued a supreme decree making official the benefits agreed in negotiations, issuing a warning that if teachers did not return to their classrooms by 28 August, they would be fired and replaced. On 2 September 2017, Castillo announced a suspension of the strike; he said it was only a temporary suspension.

== 2021 presidential election ==
The 2021 presidential elections occurred amidst the COVID-19 pandemic in Peru and a political crisis in the nation that continued during the election. These crises created multiple political currents that eventually consolidated into a growing political polarization among Peruvians.

=== First round ===
Initial discussions between former Governor of Junín, Vladimir Cerrón of Free Peru, and Verónika Mendoza of Together for Peru, recommended a leftist coalition to support a single presidential candidate in the 2021 general election. Mendoza's advisors argued that Cerrón's beliefs were too radical and of an antiquated left wing ideology. Mendoza's camp also raised concerns about Cerrón's alleged homophobic and xenophobic rhetoric. In October 2020, Castillo announced his presidential bid, running as the candidate of Free Peru, and formally attained the nomination on 6 December 2020. His ticket included attorney Dina Boluarte and Vladimir Cerrón; Cerrón was later disqualified by the National Jury of Elections due to a corruption conviction.

Pedro Castillo was chosen by a national assembly of teachers' representatives to be their candidate for the presidential election of 2021. The COVID-19 pandemic and the lack of financial resources led them to give up building a political party. Approached by several small parties, he chose Free Peru (Perú Libre, PL), of which he was not a member at the time.

During the first part of the campaign, unknown to most Peruvians, Pedro Castillo was very low in the polls and received very little media coverage. His campaign accelerated from March, when he crossed the threshold of 5% of voting intentions.

Castillo cited the impact of the COVID-19 pandemic on his students as a motivation for his presidential run. In response to the pandemic, President Martín Vizcarra initiated COVID-19 lockdowns in Peru, inhibiting trade and travel to rural Peru. As a result of the lockdowns, individuals in rural regions felt an increased sense of abandonment from the national government, with political groups in these regions beginning to act autonomously and experiencing growth in their legitimacy. Castillo told the Associated Press that he had attempted to continue teaching his students through the lockdowns, but the impoverished local community did not have the resources required for remote learning; almost none of his students had access to a cell phone, and educational tablets promised by the government never arrived. Using this experience of abandonment and distrust of the national government established in urban Lima, Castillo had a genuine ability to relate to rural voters and used his knowledge of their issues to establish support.

He campaigned for a constitutional reform (he believes that the current Constitution of Peru, promulgated in 1993 under President Alberto Fujimori, is responsible for the economic inequalities of the country because it consecrates a free market model), a restructuring of the pension system and the nationalization of the gas industry. His program was based on three main themes: health, education and agriculture, which he intended to strengthen to stimulate the country's development. He enjoyed a certain image of probity, as he was one of eight candidates (out of 18) who had not been cited in any case in a country where political corruption is high. Castillo said he would pardon Antauro Humala, a member of the Ethnocacerist movement and brother of former President Ollanta Humala who was sentenced to nineteen years in prison after leading the capture of a police station in Andahuaylas that had resulted in the deaths of four policemen and one gunman. At the conclusion of his initial campaign ahead of the first round of voting, Castillo held a rally in the Historic Centre of Lima, beginning at the Plaza San Martín before leading a march on horseback to the Plaza Dos de Mayo, where hundreds of supporters gathered. At the event, he told attendees that if elected, the citizens would supervise his policies, he would only receive the salary of a teacher, and sought to reduce the pay of congress and ministers by half.

Trailing throughout the entire campaign, his polling surged during the last weeks of the campaign and on election day, Castillo secured 18% of the vote in the first round, putting him in first place among 18 candidates. His success was attributed to his focus on the large difference of living standards between Lima and rural Peru, leading to strong support in rural provinces. He faced the second-place candidate, Keiko Fujimori, who had also finished second place in the 2011 and 2016 general elections, in the second round of voting.

After his victory in the first round, Castillo called for Peruvian political forces, including trade unions and Ronda Campesinas, to establish a political agreement, though he declined to make a roadmap similar that of Ollanta Humala during the 2016 general election. He established a political alliance with the left-wing former presidential candidate Verónika Mendoza in May 2021, earning her support for his campaign.

=== Second round ===
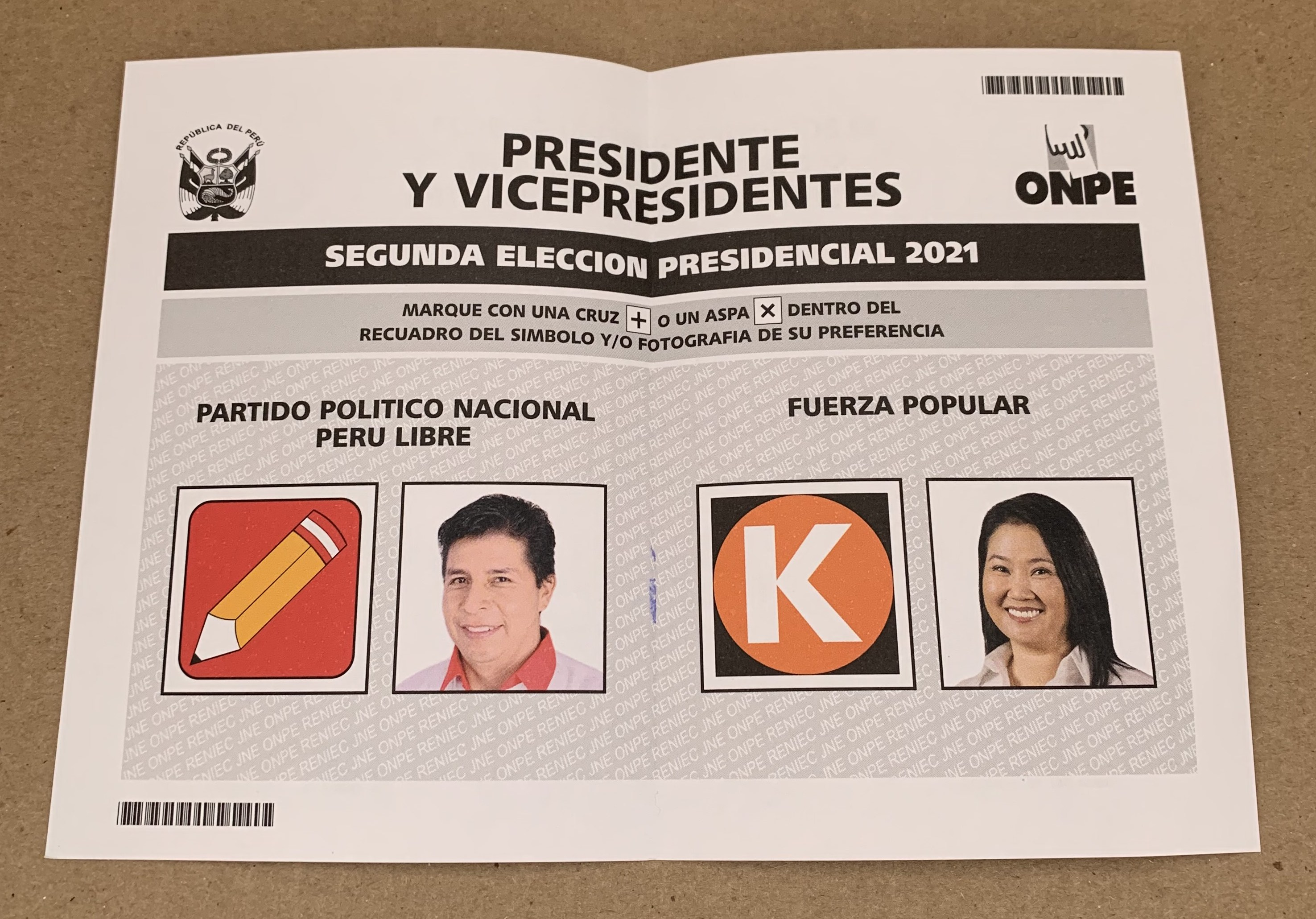
Ballot paper for the second round between Castillo and Fujimori

Approaching the second round of presidential elections, it became apparent that Castillo's policy proposals would be unlikely to be enacted as president and that he would be vulnerable to Congress; the newly elected Congress of Peru was dominated by opposition parties, with his party holding only 37 of the 130 seats in congress.

While campaigning, Castillo was insulted on multiple occasions by individuals likening him to Nicolás Maduro, president of Venezuela, while Free Peru reported that he also received anonymous death threats. Third-place candidate Rafael López Aliaga issued death threats during a demonstration against Castillo, shouting: "Death to communism! Death to Cerrón! Death to Castillo!" Castillo was also criticized for his debate performance, with critics raising questions on whether he understood governmental functions.

Castillo ultimately won the election, handing Fujimori her third consecutive defeat in a presidential election.

=== Reactions ===
Many observers described the second round of the presidential election as being a choice between the lesser of two evils. The transfer of the presidency to Castillo was described by the Institute of Peruvian Studies as "strengthening the current Peruvian democratic regime," as the process was peaceful and contributed to a "more prolonged democratic stability" in Peru in the early 21st century. The New York Times reported his victory as the "clearest repudiation of the country's establishment," and the Financial Times described him as "a hope for the poor," amid concerns among the establishment and the elite, which resulted in capital flight, in a country that was hit the most by the COVID-19 pandemic in relation to excess mortality, with an economy in recession, collapsed healthcare, a series of corruption scandals, and one third of Peruvians living in poverty.

Following Castillo's surprising success in the first round of elections, the S&P/BVL Peru General Index fell by 3.2% and the Peruvian sol saw its value drop 1.7%, its biggest loss since December 2017 during the first impeachment process against Pedro Pablo Kuczynski; in the week before the run-off vote, the sol continued to post historical lows against the U.S. dollar. An economist told the Financial Times that they had not seen such a serious capital flight in two decades. Optimistic observers felt that Castillo would moderate his views, citing former president Ollanta Humala as an example. Pedro Francke, a university professor of economics, rejected comparisons of his style of leadership to those seen in Cuba or Venezuela, and instead suggested that his governing style would be more similar to that of leftist leaders like Luiz Inácio Lula da Silva, Evo Morales, and José Mujica. Daniel Rico of RBC Capital Markets credited Francke with calming markets fears of Castillo, who was characterized by opponents as a far-left politician.

Most regional leaders and some in Europe, such as Pedro Sánchez of Spain, extended congratulations and wished Castillo the best on being the president of the bicentennial of Peru. Lula da Silva, leftist former president of Brazil, congratulated him and said that Castillo had struck a blow to conservatism in the region, saying that "the result of the Peruvian polls is symbolic and represents another advance in the popular struggle in our dear Latin America." Like Lula, Morales, the former president of Bolivia, congratulated Castillo, stating that Castillo "won with our proposal" and that he had spoken to him on the phone previously. Mujica, the former Uruguayan president, also shared approval of Castillo's success in the first round of elections, warning Castillo to "not fall into authoritarianism," while participating in a Facebook live video call with him. Colombian president Iván Duque and Ecuadorian president Guillermo Lasso congratulated Castillo on his victory.

== Presidency (2021–2022) ==
Castillo speaking during his inaugural address

Castillo was officially designated as president-elect of Peru on 19 July 2021, only a week before he was to be inaugurated. Days before his designation, Castillo and his economic advisor Pedro Francke met with Ambassador Liang Yu at the Chinese embassy in Peru to discuss a more rapid introduction of Sinopharm COVID-19 vaccines in Peru. The majority of ministers chosen by Castillo were from interior regions in contrast to previous governments where most ministers originated from Lima. Ministers were mainly from allied leftist and independent organizations, while three ministers were from Free Peru and another three were previous teachers close to Castillo.

Castillo and his government's political experience and direction had been described as being unclear by observers, as he lacked notable political experience prior to his election. In little more than the first six months of his government, four different cabinets were selected after being dissolved following numerous corruption controversies affecting Castillo and his close advisors. According to political analyst Gianfranco Vigo, the Castillo administration "is governed not so much by knowledge but rather by closeness." Castillo responded to criticism of his experience in an interview with CNN, saying that governing was "a learning process" and he was not "trained to be president," explaining that he did not study abroad by choosing to stay "for the country, for the people." He also stated during the interview that Free Peru leader Vladimir Cerrón had "no influence on cabinet appointments." Referring to Castillo's government, political scientist Paula Távara of the National University of San Marcos said it has not shown "any clear direction" and "has not yet tackled any of the promised political projects... Instead it is sinking into chaos, with new ministers constantly being appointed with no qualifications other than their party membership. Posts are distributed on a whim to forge political alliances."

In April 2022, Free Peru drafted a bill calling for general elections in 2023 to elect a new president and Congress. By late 2022, Castillo aligned with right-wing groups in Congress, meeting with the conservative group Con mis hijos no te metas and various evangelical groups to push for laws preventing the teaching of gender studies and detailed sexual education in schools.

=== Domestic policy ===
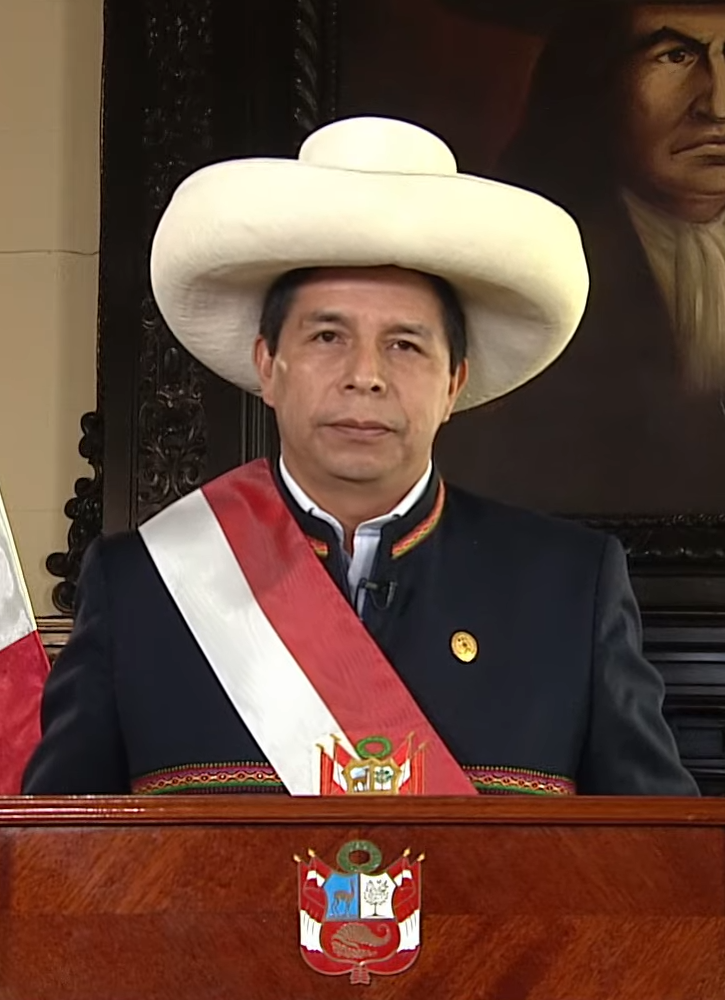
Pedro Castillo in 2021

According to Farid Kahhat of the Pontifical Catholic University of Peru, Castillo's economic policy was created in collaboration with Verónika Mendoza, utilizing New Peru economists who had an established history of holding public office. His first Minister of Economy and Finance was Pedro Francke, a former World Bank and Central Reserve Bank of Peru economist who assisted Castillo with moderating his policies. Kahhat explained that Castillo proposed taxing windfall profits, describing these profits as "the product of good international prices and not the merit of the company itself." Upon taking office, Castillo also appointed feminist and pro-LGBT activist Anahí Durand as head of the Ministry of Women and Vulnerable Populations, with Prime Minister Guido Bellido releasing a statement promising to "beat racism, classism, machismo, and homophobia."

In September 2021, Castillo announced funding of 99 million soles (US$24 million) to provide food for impoverished families, stating, "We cannot understand that, despite having so much wealth in the country, it is not balanced with development." As announced during his campaign, he launched an agrarian reform in October 2021, which he promised would not involve expropriations. It included an industrialization plan for peasants to promote the development of agriculture, and intended to offer poor peasants fairer access to markets. Following the death of Abimael Guzmán, the founder of Shining Path, Castillo said his government's "condemnation of terrorism is firm" and he condemned Guzmán, saying he was "responsible for the loss of innumerable lives of our compatriots."

In November 2021, Castillo announced an increase in the minimum wage from 930 to 1,000 soles ($223 to $250), the sale of the presidential jet acquired in 1995, and a ban on first-class travel for all civil servants. That month, the Central Reserve Bank of Peru reported that from July through September 2021, Peru's GDP grew by 11.4% and beat previous expectations, with Bloomberg News saying Peru experienced the fastest growing economy among Latin American nations at the time. The International Monetary Fund supported tax increases on the mining sector, reporting in December 2021 that Peru could safely increase taxes since the country had "a tax burden that is lower or similar to other resource-rich countries."

After Castillo's acquittal of the second impeachment attempt against him in February 2022, global economic reverberations resulted from international sanctions during the 2022 Russian invasion of Ukraine and inflation in Peru rose sharply, prompting protests. By April 2022, the inflation rate in Peru rose to its highest level in 26 years, creating greater difficulties for the recently impoverished population. Inflation of basic goods, alongside increasing fertilizer and fuel prices as a result of the war, angered rural Peruvians and shifted them from their position of supporting Castillo to protesting his government. According to Convoca, UGTRANM leader Diez Villegas, the same individual who attempted to organize strikes in October 2021, called for a general strike of transportation workers for 4 April 2022. These strikes later expanded, culminating with the 2022 Peruvian protests.

=== Foreign policy ===
Héctor Béjar, the newly appointed Minister of Foreign Affairs, said that Peru would no longer support international sanctions during the Venezuelan crisis and did not clarify his position on recognizing Juan Guaidó as part of the Venezuelan presidential crisis. Béjar resigned on 17 August 2021, amid criticism from the opposition and some media over his statement that Peru's navy had been responsible for terrorist acts and that the CIA had created the Shining Path. During his first Foreign Relations Commission with Congress, Castillo's second foreign minister Óscar Maúrtua said that Peru would remain a member of the Andean Community, the Pacific Alliance, and PROSUR, saying that Castillo's government held the "objective of achieving South American integration, for the benefit of our peoples," while also offering refuge to Afghan refugees following the Fall of Kabul.

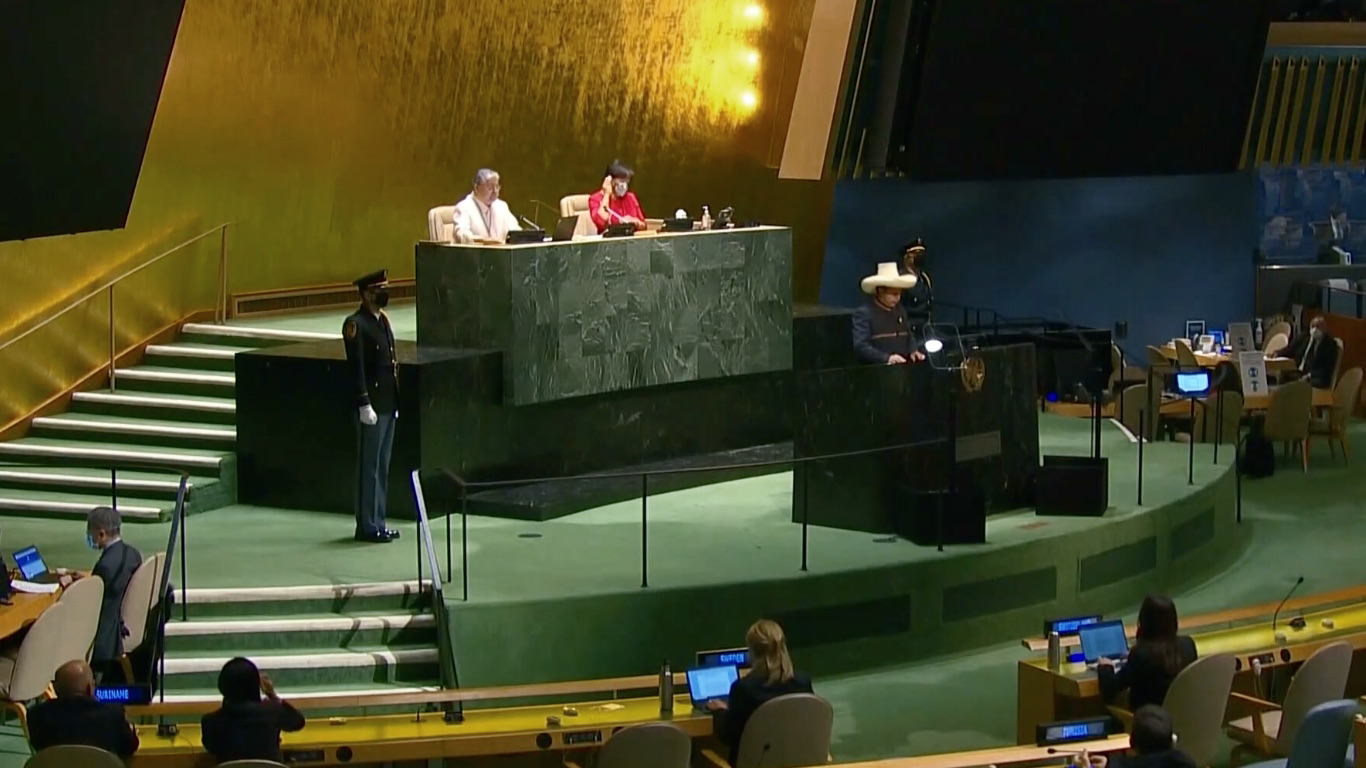
Castillo speaking during the 76th session of the United Nations General Assembly in 2021.

For his first international trips, Castillo traveled to Mexico on 17 September 2021 and later to the United States on 19 September. During his tour in the United States, Castillo and economic minister Pedro Francke met with foreign investors, along with representatives from the United States Chamber of Commerce, Pfizer, and Microsoft. Some of Peru's largest investors, such as Freeport-McMoRan and BHP, shared positive reactions of the Castillo government following their meetings. Castillo later spoke at the 76th session of the United Nations General Assembly on 21 September, proposing the creation of an international treaty signed by world leaders and pharmaceutical companies to guarantee universal vaccine access internationally, stating, "On behalf of Peru, I want to propose the signing of a global agreement between heads of state and patent owners to guarantee universal access to vaccines for all inhabitants, without discrimination or privileges, which would be a sign of our commitment to the health and lives of all peoples." Castillo argued, "The battle against the pandemic has shown us the failure of the international community to cooperate under the principle of solidarity."

During a January 2022 interview with CNN en Español, Castillo said that he would consult for a plebiscite in order to grant Bolivia access to the sea. Castillo's remarks received both positive and negative reactions in Peru. In June 2022, Castillo convened the leaders of different South American nations to treat the Venezuelan migrant crisis, with Peru being home to 1.3 million Venezuelans that fled following the crisis in Venezuela.

According to Peruvian law, the president must have the authorization of Congress every time he wants to travel abroad, with the legislative body banning Castillo from participating in foreign affairs on multiple occasions. Congress banned Castillo from traveling to Colombia for the inauguration of the new president, Gustavo Petro, denied permission to travel to the Vatican to meet with the Pope, to Thailand for the Asia-Pacific Economic Cooperation summit, and to Mexico for a meeting of the Pacific Alliance in November 2022; the latter was cancelled and rescheduled for 14 December 2022 in Lima, though it never took place.

=== Removal attempts ===
In October 2021, the website El Foco released recordings revealing that leaders of the manufacturing employers' organization National Society of Industries, the leader of the Union of Multimodal Transport Guilds of Peru (UGTRANM), Geovani Rafael Diez Villegas, political leaders, and other business executives planned various actions, including funding transportation strikes in November 2021, in order to destabilize the Castillo government and prompt his removal. Far-right groups of former soldiers also allied with political parties like Go on Country – Social Integration Party, Popular Force, and Popular Renewal in an effort to remove Castillo, with some veteran leaders seen directly with Rafael López Aliaga and Castillo's former presidential challenger Keiko Fujimori, who signed the Madrid Charter promoted by the Spanish far-right political party Vox. These groups directed threats towards Castillo government officials and journalists, while also calling for a coup d'état and insurgency. OjoPúblico compared the veteran groups, such as the far-right neofascist La Resistencia Dios, Patria y Familia militant organization that was supported by Popular Force and Popular Renewal, to the Oath Keepers and Proud Boys of the United States, noting a possible threat of an event similar to the 2021 United States Capitol attack occurring in Peru. Hundreds of members of La Resistencia and Fujimorists had already attempted to storm the Government Palace in July 2021 in rejection of election results, though such groups were repelled by authorities.

Tensions with Congress, dominated by conservative parties, were particularly high. The legislative body attempted to remove Castillo multiple times, accusing him of corruption, though charges only went as far as preliminary investigations. Congress approved a law interpreting the constitution that restricted the executive's ability to dissolve Parliament, while Parliament retained the right to impeach the President. In December 2021, Congress passed a law stating that a referendum to convene a Constituent Assembly, one of Pedro Castillo's key promises during the presidential election, could not be held without a constitutional reform previously approved by Parliament. During a visit to the Spanish Parliament, the president of the Peruvian Congress, María del Carmen Alva, asked the deputies of the Popular Party to approve a declaration stating that "Peru has been captured by communism and that Pedro Castillo is a president without any legitimacy."

==== November–December 2021 impeachment attempt ====
Presented in visitor documents as a lobbyist for the construction company Termirex, Karelim López met with Castillo's chief of staff Bruno Pacheco multiple times. In November 2021, four months into his term, Keiko Fujimori announced that her party was pushing forward impeachment proceedings, arguing that Castillo was "morally unfit for office." That day, investigators raided the Government Palace during an influence peddling investigation and found that there was US$20,000 in Pacheco's office's bathroom. Pacheco said that the money was part of his savings and salary, though he resigned from his position in order to prevent the scandal from affecting Castillo. On 25 November, 28 legislators from Fujimori's party presented a signed motion of impeachment to congress, setting up a vote for opening impeachment proceedings against Castillo. A short time later, controversy arose when newspapers reported that Castillo had met with individuals at his former campaign headquarters in Breña without public record, a potential violation of a recently created, complicated set of transparency regulations. Lobbyist Karelim López also became entangled with the controversy in Breña after the company Terminex, whom she lobbied for, won the Tarata III Bridge Consortium contract worth 255.9 million soles. Audio purportedly obtained at the residence and released by América Televisión were criticized and dismissed as a scam. Castillo responded to the impeachment threat stating: "I am not worried about the political noise because the people have chosen me, not the mafias or the corrupt." The impeachment proceeding did not occur, as 76 voted against proceedings, 46 were in favor, and 4 abstained, with a requirement of 52 favoring proceedings not being obtained. Free Peru ultimately supported Castillo through the process and described the vote as an attempted right-wing coup. Castillo responded to the vote stating, "Brothers and sisters, let's end political crises and work together to achieve a just and supportive Peru."

==== February 2022 impeachment and acquittal ====
In February 2022, it was reported that Fujimorists and politicians close to Fujimori organized a meeting at the Casa Andina hotel in Lima with the assistance of the German liberal group Friedrich Naumann Foundation, with those present including Maricarmen Alva, President of the Congress of the Republic of Peru, to discuss plans to remove President Castillo from office. Alva had already shared her readiness to assume the presidency of Peru if Castillo were to be removed from the position and a leaked Telegram group chat of the Board of Directors of Congress that she headed revealed coordinated plans to oust Castillo. A second impeachment attempt related to corruption allegations did make it to proceedings in March 2022. On 28 March 2022, Castillo appeared before Congress calling the allegations baseless and for legislators to "vote for democracy" and "against instability," with 55 voting for impeachment, 54 voting against, and 19 abstaining, not reaching the 87 votes necessary for impeaching Castillo.

In July 2022, a fifth inquiry was launched into Castillo's alleged involvement in corruption.

=== Self-coup attempt, removal from office and imprisonment ===
On 7 December 2022, hours before the Congress of Peru was scheduled to vote on a third impeachment motion against him, Castillo tried to institute an illegal self-coup; citing obstruction by Congress, he declared a national curfew, the dissolution of Congress, and the installation of a "government of exceptional emergency." Shortly after his announcement, a majority of Castillo's cabinet resigned, and the attempted dissolution was denounced as a coup by the Ombudsman of Peru. The Constitutional Court and First Vice President Dina Boluarte also called it a coup d'état attempt, one meant to obstruct the impeachment process. Castillo was then impeached and removed from the presidency by the Congress of Peru later on 7 December, as scheduled. The impeachment passed with a majority 101 for and 6 against out of 130 votes. Boluarte, who had broken with Castillo after the announcement, ascended to the presidency.

While dropping off his family at the Mexican embassy in Lima, members of the National Police of Peru who were driving Castillo feared that he was attempting to flee Peru and detained him. According to President Boluarte, Castillo's family was granted asylum by Mexico but not Castillo himself, with Castillo saying that he only sought to leave his family at the embassy for their safety and that he wanted to continue presidential duties. Castillo was held in preventive custody while being investigated for "rebellion and conspiracy," and has shared the same prison as Alejandro Toledo and Alberto Fujimori (the latter was released in December 2023 and died nine months later).

His trial for rebellion charges over the self-coup began on 4 March 2025. On 10 March, Castillo announced that he was going on a hunger strike, resulting in his hospitalization and the end of his hunger strike on 13 March. Prosecution sought 34-years imprisonment, but he received an 11 years, five months, and 15 days sentence on 27 November 2025.

=== Recognition ===
Nations recognizing presidential governments Pedro Castillo Dina Boluarte

Castillo's impeachment was recognized internationally, with countries like Spain and China, and organizations such as the European Union recognizing Boluarte and championing a return to "constitutional order." The American continent was more mixed. Members of the São Paulo Forum like Luiz Inácio Lula da Silva of Brazil and Gabriel Boric of Chile recognized Boluarte as the new president. The United States, Costa Rica and Canada recognized Boluarte as president.

However, some left-wing Latin American governments, including Bolivia, Colombia, Honduras, Mexico, and Venezuela continued to recognize Pedro Castillo as the democratically elected President of Peru following the events in December 2022 and refused to recognize Boluarte. Nicolás Maduro of Venezuela, Andrés Manuel López Obrador of Mexico, Gustavo Petro of Colombia, Alberto Fernández of Argentina, and Luis Arce of Bolivia denounced Boluarte's government as a coup, comparing the situation as similar to the ascension of Bolivia's Jeanine Áñez during the 2019 Bolivian political crisis. These presidents continued to support Pedro Castillo's claims to be the rightful president under a "government of exception."

== Political positions ==
"We have fought against terrorism and we will continue to do so. ... We are going to defend the constitutional rights of the country, there is no Chavismo, there is no communism ... ."

— Pedro Castillo, April 2021

Castillo has been described as having far-left, socialist, populist economic policies while being socially conservative. He said that he is not a communist or a Chavista, although his party is. Peru's attitude towards LGBT rights has generally been hostile and is heavily influenced by the Catholic Church, and Castillo is said to be more in line with his right-wing opponents on social issues, opposing abortion, LGBT rights, same-sex marriage, euthanasia, sex education, and the gender-equality approach in schools; this put him at odds with the progressive left that has supported him. Castillo's participation in the second round of the 2021 Peruvian presidential election placed him as one of two socially conservative candidates, in a highly polarized election.

The Economist wrote that Castillo "combines radical rhetoric with pragmatism," and cited his work with both left-wing and right-wing groups, including Keiko Fujimori's Popular Force, during the 2017 teachers' strike. Le Monde diplomatique wrote that Castillo maintained support prior to being elected because his positions were "rather vague." Castillo later distanced himself from the far-left of the Free Peru party, stating that "the one who is going to govern is me," and that there would be "no communism" in Peru under his government. Kahhat said that Castillo limited his relationship with Free Peru and separated himself from the party's leader, adding that "it is important to remember that Castillo is a candidate but not a party member... [We] might even say he is more conservative than the ideals of [Free Peru] would suggest." Anthony Medina Rivas Plata, a political scientist at the Catholic University of Santa María, said that "Castillo's rise is not because he is left-wing, but because he comes from below. He has never said he is a Marxist, socialist, or communist. What he is is an evangelical."

After winning the first round of presidential elections, Castillo presented his ideas in a more moderated manner, maintaining a balance between the leftist ideals of Free Peru and the conservative consensus of Peruvians. Following his ascent to the presidency, Free Peru broke from Castillo, who distanced himself from Vladimir Cerrón, believing that he moderated his positions to appease businesses and opposing politicians. On 30 June 2022, Castillo resigned from Free Peru.

=== Domestic ===
==== Economy ====
Castillo expressed his interest in moving Peru more towards a mixed economy. He promised foreign businesses that he would not nationalize companies in Peru, saying that those seeking the nationalization of industry within his party were part of the "leftist fringe." Some of his main economic proposals were to regulate "monopolies and oligopolies" in order to establish a mixed economy and to renegotiate tax breaks with large businesses. Castillo made statements supporting increased regulation, directly criticizing Chilean companies Saga Falabella and LATAM Airlines Group. Citing the fact that LATAM owes Peru nearly $1 billion, Castillo called for a state-owned national airline. In an interview with CNN, he stated that if elected, he would hold discussions with businesses to ensure that "70% of profits must remain for the country" and that "they take 30%, not the other way around as it is today."

Castillo proposed increasing the education and health budgets to at least 10 percent of Peru's GDP. He received criticism from EFE for not clarifying how these policies would be funded, as Peru's existing government budget is already 14 percent of the country's GDP. Castillo believed that internet access should be a right for all Peruvians. He proposed a science and technology ministry that would immediately be tasked with combating the COVID-19 pandemic in Peru.

Regarding mining in Peru, Castillo supported the extraction of minerals throughout Peru "where nature and the population allow it," and welcomed international investment in these projects. For agrarian reform, Castillo proposed making Peru less reliant on importing agricultural goods and incentivizing food production for local use instead of solely for export.

==== Governance ====
A main proposal of Castillo was to elect a constituent assembly to replace the constitution inherited from Alberto Fujimori's regime, with Castillo saying "it serves to defend corruption on a macro scale." Castillo said that, in his efforts to rewrite the Peruvian constitution, he would respect the rule of law by utilizing existing constitutional processes and call for a constitutional referendum to determine whether a constituent assembly should be formed or not.

At an event called Citizen Proclamation – Oath for Democracy, Castillo signed an agreement vowing to respect democracy, stating, "I swear with all my heart, I do swear with all my heart, that I will respect true democracy and equal rights and opportunities of the Peruvian people, without any discrimination and favoritism." Castillo also promised at the event to respect the presidential term limit of a five-year tenure, saying that if elected, he would not adjust mechanisms to extend the presidential period and would leave office on 28 July 2026. Other statements by Castillo included respecting the separation of powers and recognizing the autonomy of constitutional entities.

==== Social ====
Castillo's proposed social policies included creating paramilitary groups and militarizing Peruvian youth to promote a revolutionary experience, calling for citizens to arm themselves in order to provide justice through "socialist administration." He called for Peru to leave the American Convention on Human Rights and to reinstate the death penalty in the country. Castillo also called for stricter regulations on the media in Peru.

According to Castillo, issues of abortion and LGBT rights were "not a priority." His socialist woman proposal (La mujer socialista) was described by Javier Puente, assistant professor of Latin American Studies at Smith College as "a deeply patriarchal, gender-normative view of society disguised under seemingly liberating language" while the rest of his program did not include any policies regarding LGBT groups, who are vulnerable populations in Peru.

Castillo announced during his inauguration that youths who do not work or study would have to serve in the military; as there is no mandatory service in Peru, it was unclear whether Castillo would introduce conscription.

=== International ===
==== Latin America ====
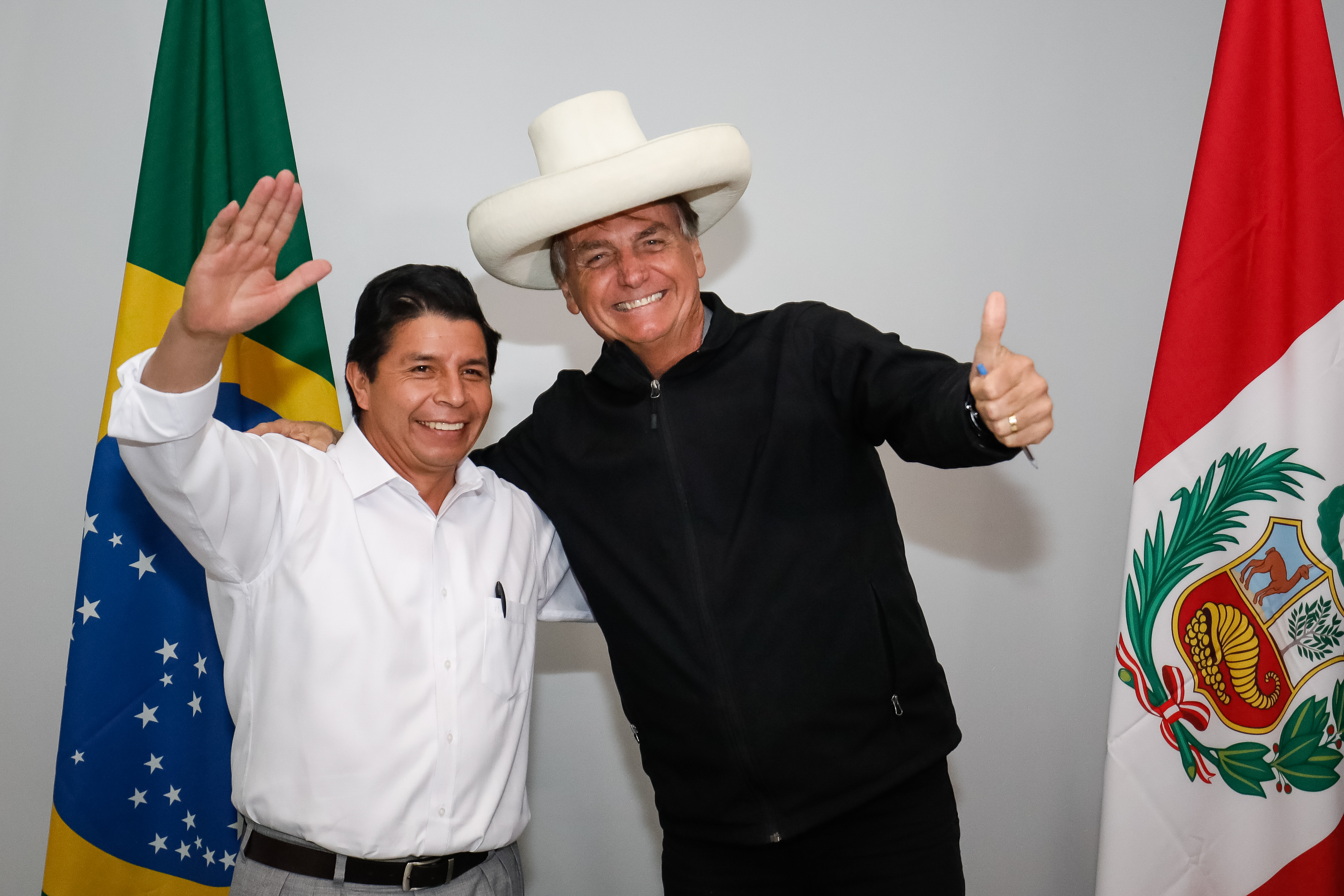
Castillo embracing Jair Bolsonaro, President of Brazil, who said Castillo held "conservative values".

Castillo defended the government of Nicolás Maduro in Venezuela, describing it as "a democratic government", while his Free Peru party shared praise for the policies of Fidel Castro and Hugo Chávez. After winning the first round of presidential elections, Castillo stated regarding Venezuela that "there is no Chavismo here", saying of President Maduro, "if there is something he has to say concerning Peru, that he first fix his internal problems." He also called on Maduro to take Venezuelan refugees back to their native country, saying that Venezuelans arrived in Peru "to commit crimes." Castillo described the Venezuelan refugee crisis as an issue of "human trafficking," and said that he would give Venezuelans who commit crimes 72 hours to leave Peru.

Venezuela's opposition leader Juan Guaidó, who was recognized as legitimate president of Venezuela by Peru amidst the Venezuelan presidential crisis beginning in 2019, wished that Castillo would "decide for the good of freedom" after President Maduro's foreign minister Jorge Arreaza attended Castillo's inauguration. Guaidó warned that the Lima Group could be renamed "Quito Group" if Peru recognizes Maduro. Castillo called for plans to "deactivate" the group.

In November 2021, Castillo announced the rejection of the 2021 Nicaraguan general election results, saying they were not "free, fair, and transparent elections." In addition, he supported the pressure measures against the government of Daniel Ortega by the Organization of American States.

At a bilateral meeting with president of Brazil Jair Bolsonaro on 3 February 2022, Castillo was seen embracing him. Bolsonaro, who wore Castillo's straw chotano hat, said Castillo was a defender of freedom and "conservative values." Bolsonaro and Castillo also discussed a proposed highway through the Amazon rainforest, the removal of bureaucratic trade regulations, and increased drug trade monitoring.

==== Europe ====
Like Mexico's Andrés Manuel López Obrador and other Latin American left-wing politicians, Castillo was critical of the colonisation of Latin America by Spain. During his investiture, which King Felipe VI of Spain attended, he spoke strongly against Spanish colonial rule.

== Controversies ==
=== Terruqueo target ===
"When you go out to ask for rights, they say that you are a terrorist, ... I know the country and they will not be able to shut me up, ... The terrorists are hunger and misery, abandonment, inequality, injustice."

— Pedro Castillo, April 2021

During the terrorism in Peru in the 1980s and 1990s, the government, military, and media in Peru described individuals on the left of the political spectrum as being a threat to the nation, with many students, professors, union members, and peasants being jailed or killed for their political beliefs. Such sentiments continued for decades into the 2021 election, with Peru's right-wing elite and media organizations collaborating with Keiko Fujimori's campaign by appealing to fear when discussing Castillo, linking him to armed communist groups through a fearmongering political attack known as a terruqueo. The terreuqueo was also used beside classist and racist rhetoric against Castillo.

In 2017, Castillo's participation in the teacher's strike was criticized by Minister of the Interior, Carlos Basombrío Iglesias, who said Castillo was involved with MOVADEF, a group consisting of former members of Shining Path. Castillo said he was not involved with MOVADEF or the militant teachers' union faction CONARE and that those factions should not be involved in teaching. In June 2018, Hamer Villena Zúñiga, the leader of the United Union of Workers in Education of Peru (SUTEP), stated that Castillo's sister, María Doraliza Castillo Terrones, was a member of MOVADEF. In 2018 and 2020, the newspaper Peru.21 accused Castillo of being linked to Shining Path, and published documents citing his alleged participation in virtual meetings with the organization's leadership during the COVID-19 pandemic in Peru.

Claims linking Castillo to MOVADEF and Shining Path were refuted by Castillo himself and major media outlets. With Castillo being a member of the Ronda Campesina, which often partnered with the Peruvian Armed Forces to defend rural communities against guerrilla groups, allegations by Peruvian journalists of his links to Shining Path were contradictory. The Guardian described links to Shining Path as "incorrect," and the Associated Press said that allegations by Peruvian media of links to Shining Path were "unsupported." The Economist wrote that at the same time Castillo allegedly worked with groups linked to Shining Path, he was also partnering with right-wing legislators from Popular Force, Fujimori's party, in the same capacity.

=== Company ===
According to Public Records, Castillo founded a company called Consorcio Chotano de Inversionistas Emprendedores JOP S.A.C., which he did not indicate in his resume presented to the National Jury of Elections. Former congresswoman Yeni Vilcatoma of the Popular Force, a Fujimorist party, filed a complaint for the public prosecution which opened a preliminary investigation, Within the context of the second-round campaign, Keiko Fujimori distanced herself from Vilcatoma and denounced her, saying, "I like to win political competitions on the field." Castillo said that he did not list the company because he did not remember its existence since it never operated; it is indicated that he invested 18,000 soles. This was made public after the complaint made by journalist and columnist Alfredo Vignolo, who later claimed that he received death threats through social networks by supporters of Castillo.

== Personal life ==
Castillo is married to Lilia Paredes, a teacher, and they have two children together. Castillo is Catholic and has participated regularly in the local festival dedicated to the Virgin of Sorrows ("Virgen de los Dolores") held in Anguía. His wife and children are evangelicals. He is a teetotaler, practicing abstinence from consuming alcohol. His family lives in a nine-room home in the Chugur District, tending a farm with cows, pigs, corn, and sweet potatoes.

Castillo was known for wearing a straw hat called a chotano, a poncho, and sandals constructed from old tires. Richard Rojas, his former campaign chief, told Latina Televisión that the hat was originally his brother's and that Castillo started wearing it as a means to stand out during rallies. He had stopped wearing the hat by February 2022.

== Electoral history ==
Year	Office	Type	Party	Main opponent	Party	Votes for Castillo				Result	Swing
Year	Office	Type	Party	Main opponent	Party	Total	%	P.	±%	Result	Swing
2002	Mayor of Anguía	Municipal	Possible Peru	José Alberto Yrigoin	National Unity	104	8.82%	4th	N/A	Lost	N/A
2021	President of Peru	General	Free Peru	Keiko Fujimori	Popular Force	2,724,752	18.92%	1st	N/A	N/A	N/A
2021	President of Peru	General (2nd round)	Free Peru	Keiko Fujimori	Popular Force	8,836,380	50.13%	1st	N/A	Won	Gain

== Awards ==
- Bolivia
  - Grand Collar of the Order of the Condor of the Andes (2021)
- Peru
  - Grand Master of the Order of the Sun of Peru (2021)
  - Grand Master of the Order of Merit for Distinguished Service (2021)

== See also ==
- List of Peruvians
- Bruno Pacheco

== Notes ==
Party political offices
Preceded by Vladimir Cerrón	Free Peru nominee for President of Peru; 2021	Succeeded by Vladimir Cerrón
Political offices
Preceded by Francisco Sagasti	President of Peru; 2021–2022	Succeeded by Dina Boluarte
