= Lilia Paredes =

Peruvian teacher and First Lady of Peru (born 1973)

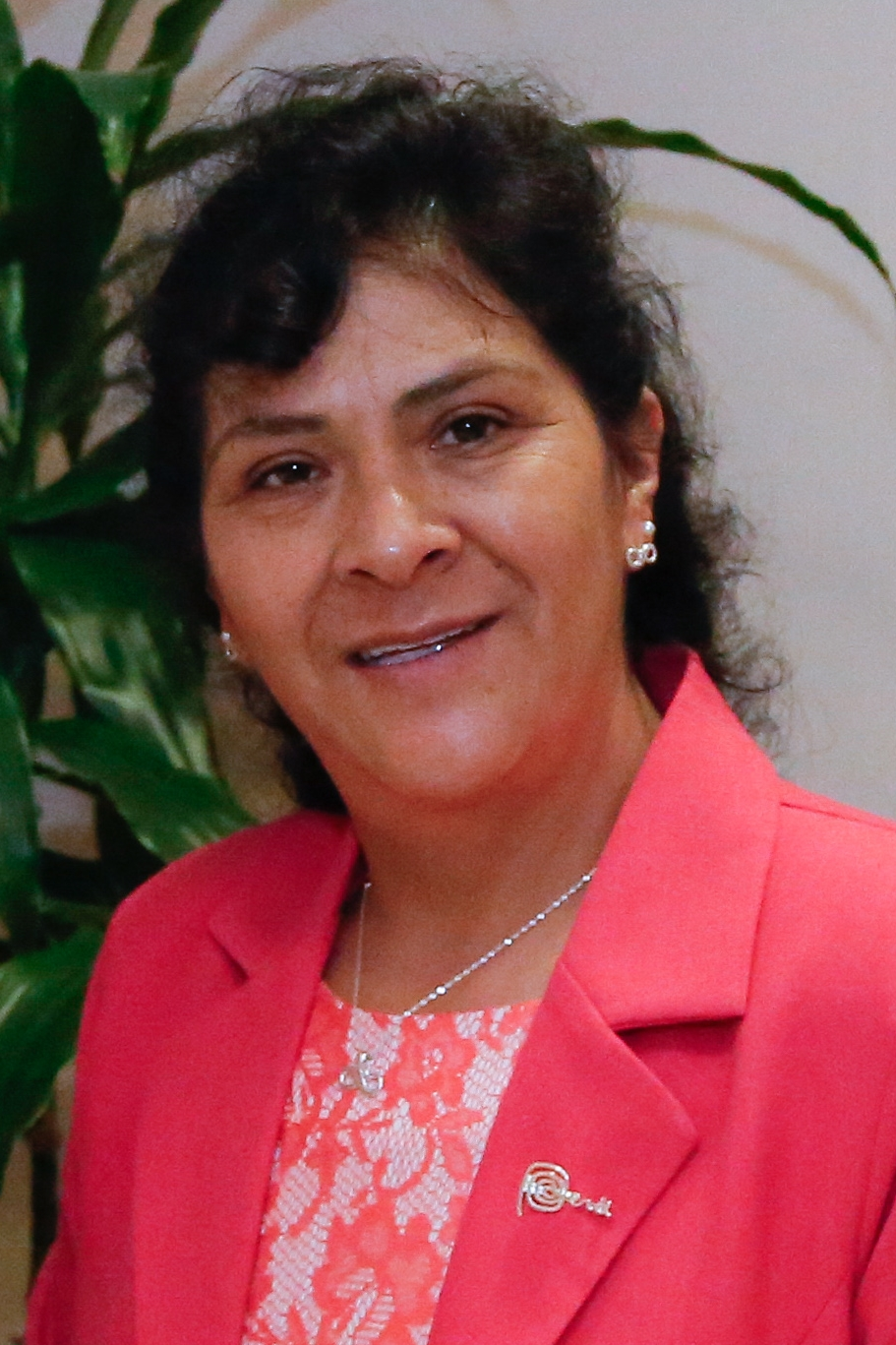
- Paredes in 2022

First Lady of Peru
- In role 28 July 2021 – 7 December 2022
- President: Pedro Castillo
- Preceded by: Mary Peña Carruitero (2020)
- Succeeded by: Blanca Quiroz de Balcázar

Personal details
- Born: 23 April 1973 (age 53) Tacabamba, Chota, Peru
- Spouse: Pedro Castillo (m. 2000)
- Children: 2
- Relatives: Yenifer Paredes (sister)
- Education: César Vallejo University
- Profession: Teacher

Lilia Ulcida Paredes Navarro (born 23 April 1973) is a Peruvian teacher who was the first lady of Peru from 28 July 2021 to 7 December 2022 and the wife of President Pedro Castillo. She and her children are Evangelicals, while her husband is a Catholic.

== Biography ==
Lilia Paredes was born on April 23, 1973, in Tacabamba, a town in the province of Chota that belongs to the Cajamarca.

In addition to being a rural teacher with a bachelor's degree in education and a master's degree in Educational Psychology from the César Vallejo University, Paredes is also a weaver, artisan and rancher.

In 2000, Paredes married teacher Pedro Castillo, her partner since adolescence and with whom she already had two children, Arnol and Alondra. She also has a putative child, Yenifer, her younger sister, who was raised as another daughter by the couple upon the death of her mother.

She belongs to the Christian Church of the Nazarene, an evangelical congregation.

Before assuming the position of first lady and moving to Lima, Paredes lived in the town of Chugur, in the district of Anguía.
