= Francisco Cardoso Romero =

Peruvian politician (1948–2026)

Member of the Congress of the Republic of Peru
- In office 27 July 1995 – 26 July 2000

Personal details
- Born: Juan Francisco Cardoso Romero; 31 December 1948 Tacabamba District, Peru
- Died: 8 April 2026 (aged 77)
- Party: C90—NM; APP
- Education: Pedro Ruiz Gallo National University
- Occupation: Agricultural engineer

Juan Francisco Cardoso Romero (31 December 1948 – 8 April 2026) was a Peruvian politician. A member of Cambio 90 – New Majority and the Alliance for Progress, he served in the Congress of the Republic from 1995 to 2000.

Cardoso died on 8 April 2026, at the age of 77.
