= Puna =

Puna may refer to:

== Places ==
=== Americas ===
- Puña, a town in the Department of Cajamarca of Peru
- Puna, Potosí, a village in Bolivia
- Puna, Hawaii, a district in the east-southeast portion of the Island of Hawaiʻi
- Puná Island, an island off the coast of southern Ecuador
  - Battle of Puná, a battle fought between Spanish conquistadors and Puná natives
- Altiplano or Puna, a region that covers part of Bolivia, Peru, and the northern end of Argentina and Chile
- Puna de Atacama, a plateau in the Andes

=== Asia ===
- Pune, or Puna, a city in Maharashtra, India
- Puna, Gujarat, a town in Gujarat, India
- Puna, Pakistan, a village in Punjab, Pakistan

== Other uses ==
- Puna grassland, a type of grassland in the central part of the high Andes
- Puna (mythology), a character in Polynesian mythology
- Maihueniopsis or Puna, a cactus genus
- Henry Puna, Cook Islands politician

== See also ==
- Poona (disambiguation)
