= Con mis hijos no te metas =

Conservative social movement

Don't Mess With My Children
- Con mis hijos no te metas
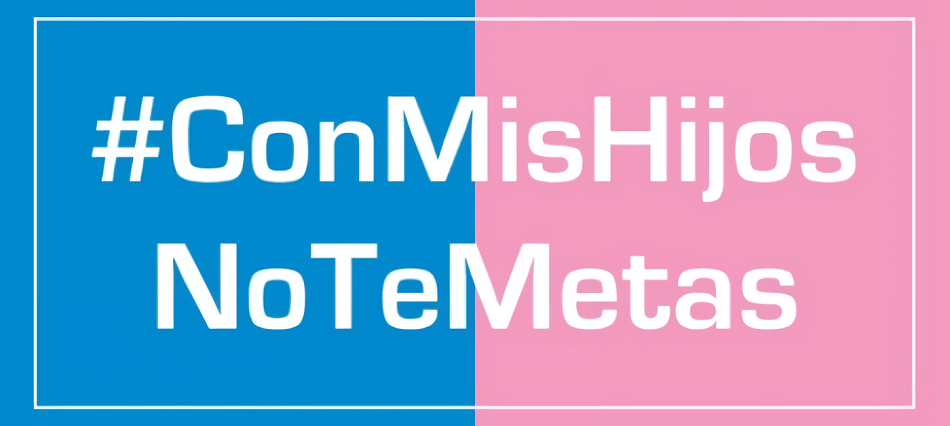

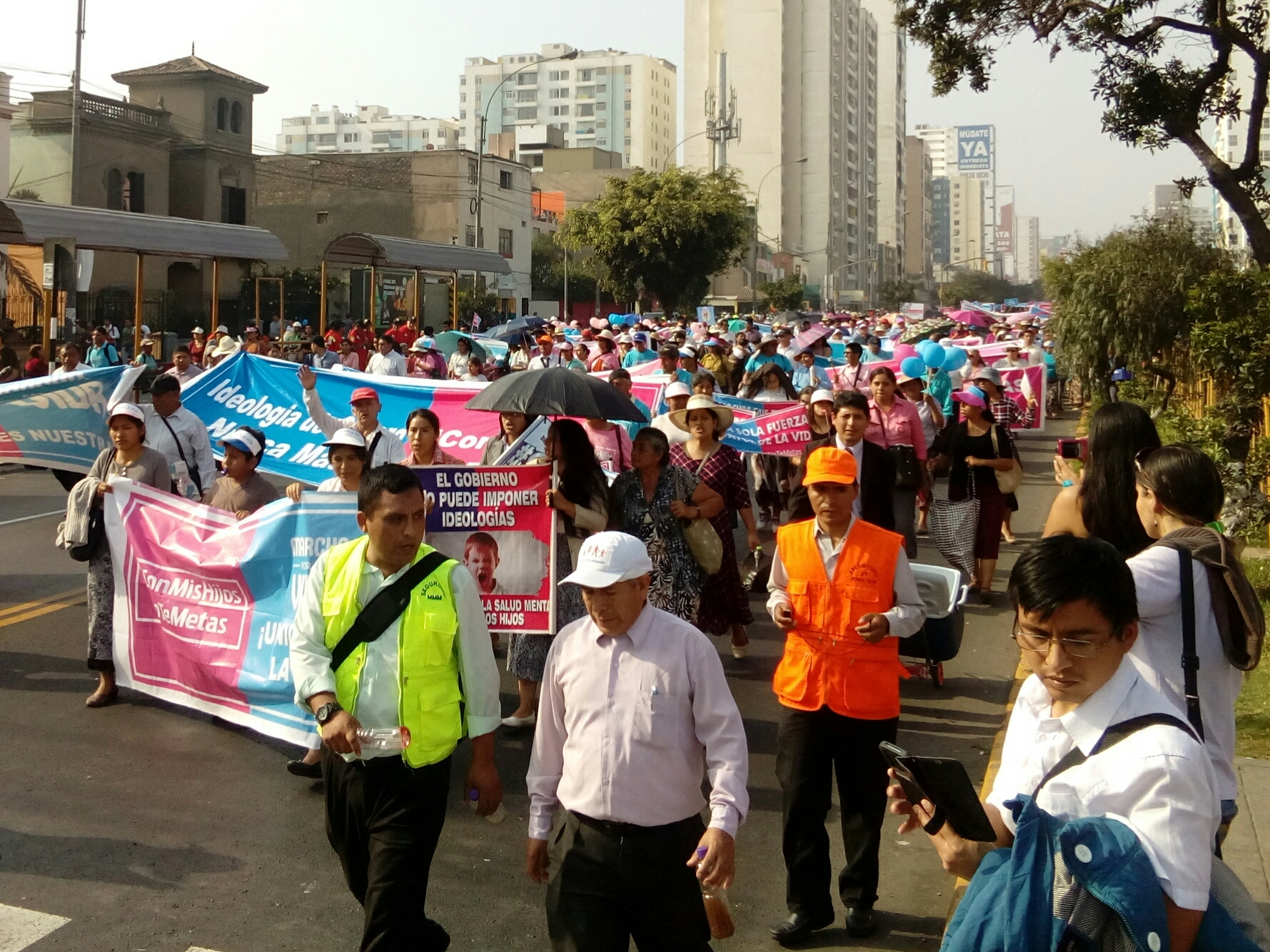
- CMHNTM protestors at the 2018 March for Life.
- Abbreviation: CMHNTM
- Formation: 26 December 2016
- Headquarters: Lima
- Location: Peru
- Affiliations: Christian fundamentalism Conservatism; Fujimorism
- Website: conmishijosnotemetas.pe

Con mis hijos no te metas (CMHNTM, English: Don't mess with my children) is a social movement born in Lima, Peru, on 26 December 2016, in opposition to the public gender development policies of the Peruvian government in education and other areas of public administration as part of the 2017 national curriculum. Like other Christian conservative movements, its adherents use the term "gender ideology".

The movement claims that measures based on gender ideology seek to destabilize the nuclear family. It follows an Antisemitic conspiracy theory accusing George Soros of aiming to establish a New World Order that promotes homosexuality from childhood, legalizes and industrializes abortion and gender transition, legalizes same-sex marriage, controls the population, and promotes moral degradation. According to the conspiracy theory, these efforts will culminate in domination of the world economy.

CMHNTM asserts that it is independent of political and religious ideology; however, its membership includes Christian fundamentalists, sympathizers of the Christian right, and the Fujimorist political formation Popular Force. One of the members of the CMHNTM was Pedro Castillo, who during his administration did not promote any laws in favor of sexual diversity and did not review a bill to require that school textbooks be supervised by parents and groups such as CMHNTM.

== Context ==
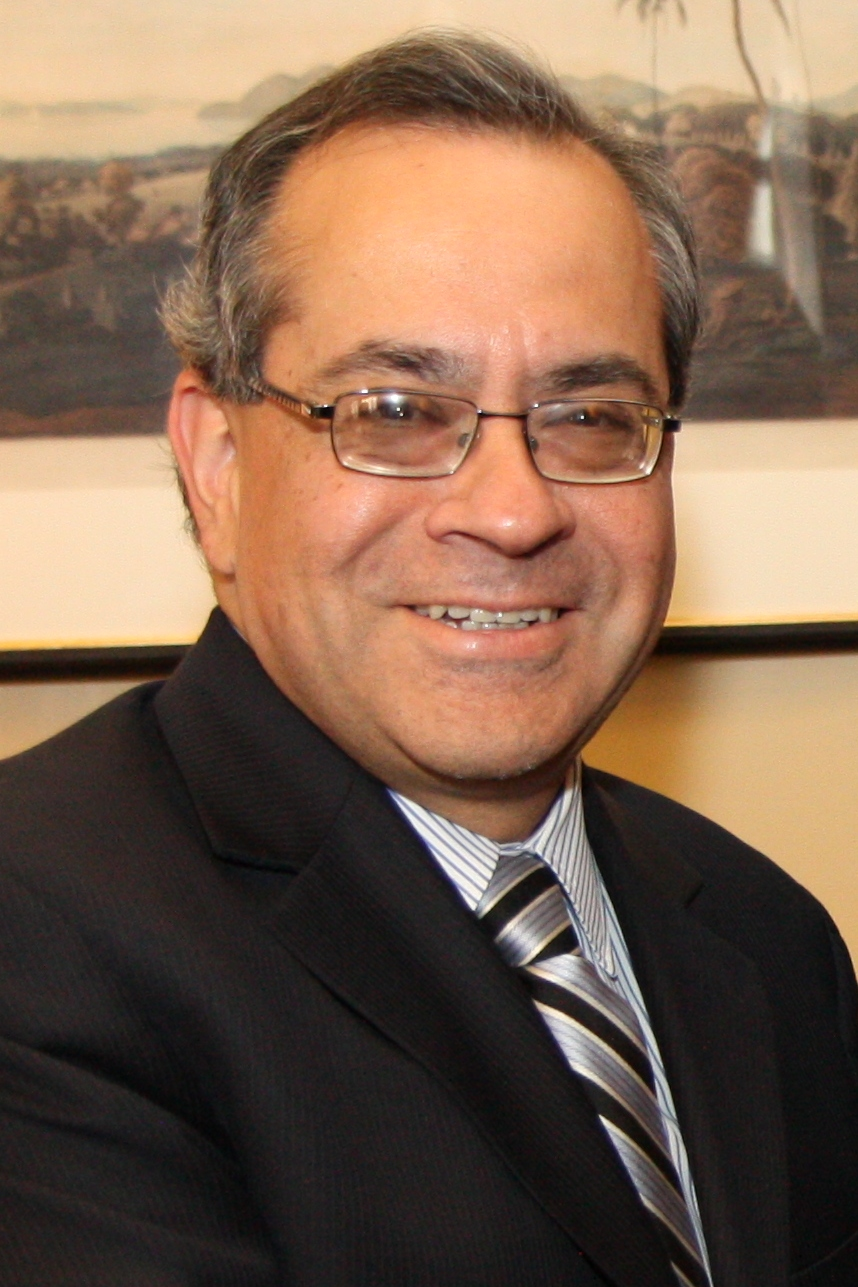
Former minister of education Jaime Saavedra, was censured by Congress and forced to resign.

When Pedro Pablo Kuczynski became president, he commissioned Jaime Saavedra to modify educational requirements to teach respect for all sexual orientations. One provision was gender equality, for which high rates of aggression against women and homosexuals, including homicides, were cited. It was also intended to strengthen sex education and reduce dropouts due to teenage pregnancy. It was approved to combine gender studies in a new agenda, in a language comprehensible to primary students, and that would be fully enforced in 2017.

"We want our boys to internalize gender equality."

When faced with the first conservative oppositions to the agenda and the controversy over the alleged gender ideology, Saavedra declared:

"We have to be tolerant and respectful of any sexual orientation."

The minister of education Jaime Saavedra was censured at the end of 2016. His successor Marilú Martens continued to promote the 2017 national curriculum.

== National marches ==
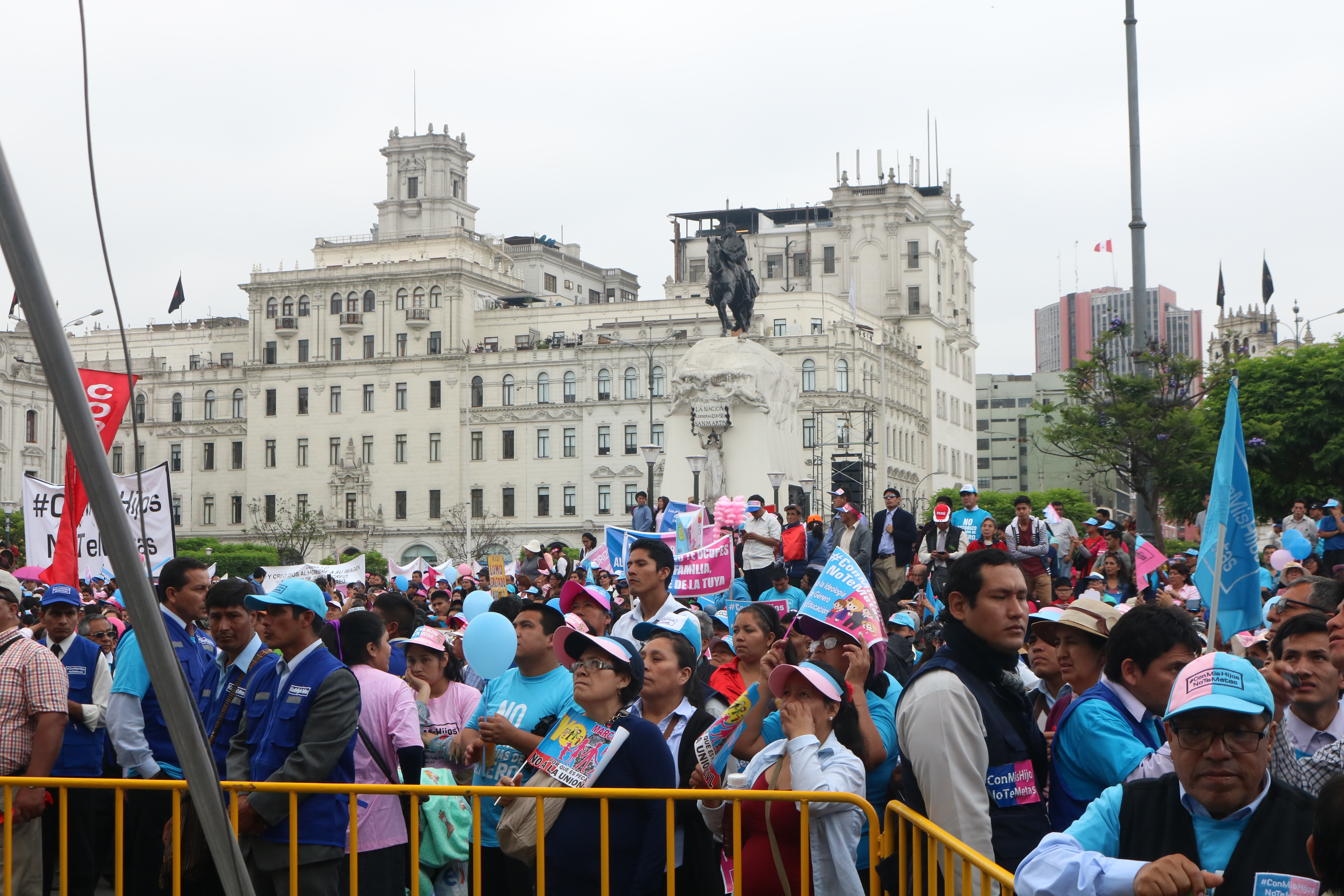
CMHNTM sit-in at Plaza San Martín, 15 November 2018.

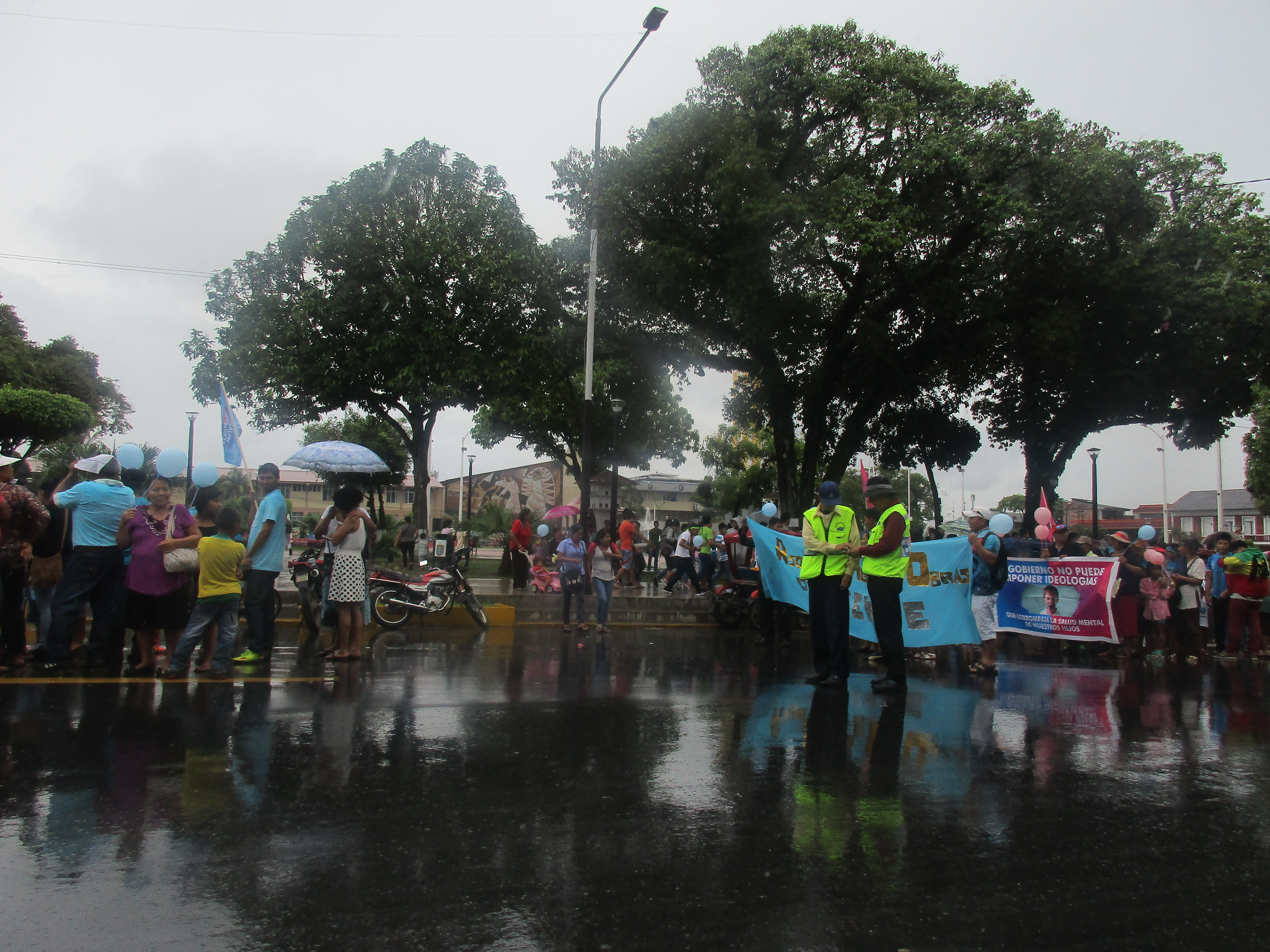
March in Iquitos, 4 March 2017.

To protest school curriculum, a series of marches were organized. On 27 January 2017, a group marched along Avenida Javier Prado to the Ministry of Education. Subsequently, a national protest was organized and held on 4 March 2017. It was supported by various artists, politicians, and Evangelical as well as Catholic movements. In Lima, the protestors gathered at Plaza de toros de Acho (Rímac), Parque del Trabajo (San Martín de Porres), Coliseo Amauta (Breña) and parque Mariscal Castilla (Lince), moving towards Plaza San Martín.

== Controversies ==
Since its creation, members have committed aggressive acts, such as attacking a member of the LGBT community who participated in a counterprotest; but the most known controversy involved World Missionary Movement pastor Rodolfo González Cruz, who was accused of inciting hatred in his preaching: "(...) When encountering a woman having sex with an animal, you kill the woman and the animal, whether it is a dog or any other animal, in the name of Jesus (...)"; he was also accused of saying that: "Homosexuals are rotten, corrupt, and unhappy people who are doomed to death". Despite the evidence, González denied inciting to murder homosexuals.

Radio announcer Phillip Butters, who showed support for the religious collective, participated in a march on 4 March, during which he made various rude comments against the opposition, their children, and LGBT couples. He was fired from Radio Capital due to his participation as his contract stated he was prohibited from participating in public marches. Days after, he was hired by another company and expressed his continuous support of the movement, stating, "Gender ideology exists".

On 11 January 2017, the Ecuadorian Latin American Information Agency accused the group of promoting homophobia.

=== Street and bridge protests and survey on gender approach ===
On 25 April 2019, the media reported CMHNTM protests on various bridges of the Paseo de la República Avenue (from Barranco to Lima District), as well as ones in different streets of capital districts such as Los Olivos, El Agustino, San Juan de Miraflores, Puente Piedra, La Molina, Lince, Villa María del Triunfo, among others. In such places appeared the well-known pink/light blue posters, in clear allusion to the female/male dichotomy, but unlike the slogan Con Mis Hijos No Te Metas, the phrases were more radical. "Minister Flor Pablo, no to school orgies", "Vizcarra do not corrupt the education of children. No to pornography in schools", "Vizcarra, do not promote sexual perversion and abortions", "Gender Focus = Anal Sex", were some.

On 25 April 2019, pollster Ipsos Peru with newspaper El Comercio published a survey conducted between 12 and 14 April 2019, in which 82% of Peruvians approved the inclusion of gender approach in school curriculum, reaching 91% in socio-economic level (NSE) B. However, the percentage was reduced to 74% in NSE A, and to 78% in the population group aged 40 years and older. 15% were against the educational measure.

=== Information manipulation ===
The use of misrepresentation to reinforce a negative image about the measures taken by the government to combat homophobia through early childhood education has been denounced and documented. NTMCMH assured and denounced that in the tutoring guide for sixth grade students, published by the Ministry of Education in November 2015, contained some images of the classic story Little Red Riding Hood where the protagonist could be changed by children. Also, according to the movement, in the comprehensive sex education guide for primary school teachers published in 2014, a story entitled Oliver Button Is a Girl was included that sought to eliminate discrimination against people who opt for activities typically associated with the opposite sex. This misrepresentation was published by Fujimorist congressmen Nelly Cuadros and Juan Carlos Gonzales on their Twitter accounts claiming they were a part of the current curriculum, provoking protests mostly from conservatives. However, the information correlated to stories published in Spain.

== See also ==
- Christianity and homosexuality
- LGBT rights in Peru
- Freedom of education
