= Puña =

- Town
- Location within Peru
- Coordinates: 6.344472°S 78.653778°W
- Country: Peru
- Department: Cajamarca
- Province: Chota
- District: Tacabamba

Puña, also known as San Luis de Puña, is a Peruvian town in the Tacabamba District of the Chota Province, located in the center of the Cajamarca Department.

The town is the birthplace of former president Pedro Castillo.

== Geography ==
The rural town of Puña is located about six hours by automobile from the area's largest city, Cajamarca. The town comprises scattered adobe homes constructed on hillside terrain and narrow dirt roads tracing along the edges of dangerous cliffs.

== Demographics ==
Despite being located in a department that holds a large portion of Peru's mineral wealth, seventy percent of the population of Puña live in poverty, with the majority of households earning less than US$100 monthly in 2021. Much of the population is aged; younger generations left the town in order to live in more populated urban centers.

== Notable people ==
- Pedro Castillo was born in Puña
