= Chacamarca Historic Sanctuary =

Archaeological site in Peru

- Santuario Histórico de Chacamarca
- IUCN category III (natural monument or feature)
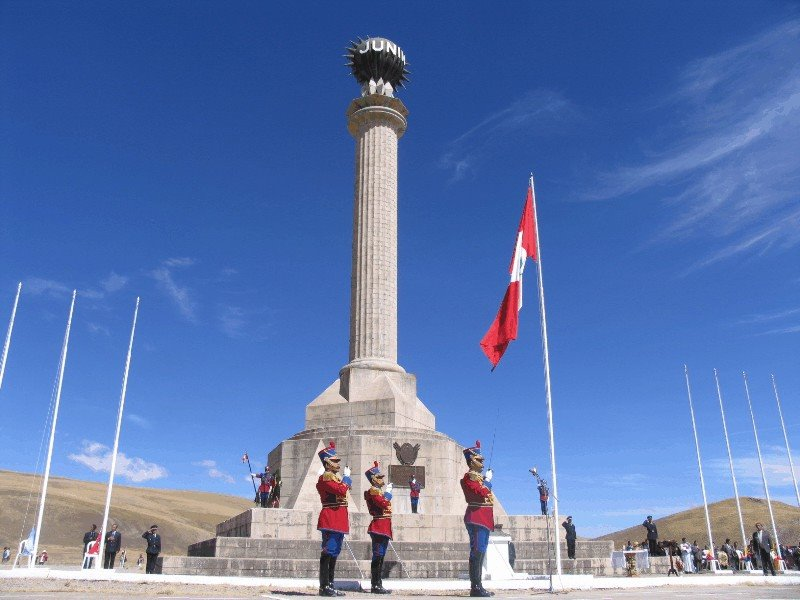
- Obelisk at Chacamarca Historic Sanctuary

- Location within Peru
- Location: Peru; Junín Region
- Nearest city: Junín
- Coordinates: 11°12′59″S 75°58′12″W
- Area: 25 km^{2} (9.65 sq mi)
- Established: 7 August 1974
- Governing body: SERNANP
- Website: Santuario Histórico de Chacamarca

Chacamarca Historic Sanctuary (Spanish: Santuario Histórico de Chacamarca), is a historical site in Junín Province, Junín, Peru. The sanctuary protects the site of the Battle of Junín and archaeological remains of the Pumpush culture.

== History ==
Prior to the arrival of the conquistadors, the area was occupied by the Pumpush and the Yarovilca cultures and after them, the Incas. The Incas occupied the area gradually and integrated it to the rest of the empire through the Capac Ñan (Inca road system). As a result, an Inca settlement flourished at Chacamarca.

The Battle of Junín, which was fought on 6 August 1824, is regarded as one of the definite episodes in the Peruvian War of Independence, which helped to bring to an end the Spanish rule in Peru and the Americas.

The historical sanctuary was established on 7 August 1974, to preserve the historic site of the Battle of Junín, by a decree during the dictatorship of General Juan Velasco Alvarado.

== Geography ==
This historic landmark is located at 4105 m of elevation in a high andean plain known as Pampa de Junín. The historic sanctuary spans an area of 2,500 hectares (25.00 km^{2}).

== Climate ==
The area has an annual average temperature of 4.8 °C. The rainy season spans from October to April; with an annual average precipitacion of 800 mm.

== Ecology ==
=== Flora ===
The sanctuary also protects part of the puna ecosystem, comprising grasslands and wetlands. Native plant species found at the site include: Festuca dolychophylla, Jarava ichu, Calamagrostris vicunarum, Carex ecuadorica, Alchemilla pinnata, Trichophorum rigidum, Astragalus garbancillo, Distichia muscoides, Plantago rigida, Werneria nubigena, Hypochaeris taraxacoides, Erythranthe glabrata, Gentiana sedifolia, Luzula peruviana, Acaulimalva crenata, Hordeum muticum, Aciachne pulvinata, Azorella diapensioides, Solanum acaule, etc.

=== Fauna ===
Bird species protected in the sanctuary include: the Puna tinamou, the Andean goose, the Andean flicker, the Puna ibis, the chiguanco thrush, the Andean lapwing, the aplomado falcon, Cinclodes spp., Raimondi's yellow finch, the variable hawk, Anas spp., the Andean hillstar, the black-winged ground dove, etc.

Among the mammals reported in the area are: the vicuña, Molina's hog-nosed skunk, the Andean fox, and the montane guinea pig.

== Activities ==
It is possible to visit the site and have a panoramic view of the plains from two hills inside the sanctuary. There are also archeological sites inside the sanctuary, like the colcas, which were Inca warehouses that once stored food and other goods.

== Environmental issues ==
Land tenure conflict with surrounding communities; livestock grazing; illegal hunting; illegal plant extraction and garbage dumping next to the sanctuary are the main issues that threaten the local biodiversity and the preservation of the site.
