= Kuntur Qaqa =

Kuntur Qaqa (Quechua kuntur condor, qaqa rock, "condor rock", hispanicized spellings Condor Jaja, Condor Khakha, Cóndor Caca, Condorcaca, Condorcaga, Condorgaga, Condorjaca, Condorjaja) may refer to:

- Kuntur Qaqa (Ancash), a mountain in the Ancash Region, Peru
- Kuntur Qaqa (Bolivia), a mountain in the Tomás Frías Province, Potosí Department, Bolivia
- Kuntur Qaqa (Cajamarca), an archaeological site on a mountain of that name in the Cajamarca Region, Peru
- Kuntur Qaqa (Chayanta), a mountain in the Chayanta Province, Potosí Department, Bolivia
