= Chimbán District =

Coordinates: 6.2519°S 78.4778°W

Chimban
- District
- Interactive map of Chimban
- Country: Peru
- Region: Cajamarca
- Province: Chota
- Founded: October 21, 1942
- Capital: Chimban

Government
  - Mayor: Raul Monsalve Rojas

Area
  - Total: 198.99 km^{2} (76.83 sq mi)
- Elevation: 1,650 m (5,410 ft)

Population (2005 census)
  - Total: 2,842
  - Density: 14.28/km^{2} (36.99/sq mi)
- Time zone: UTC-5 (PET)
- UBIGEO: 060405

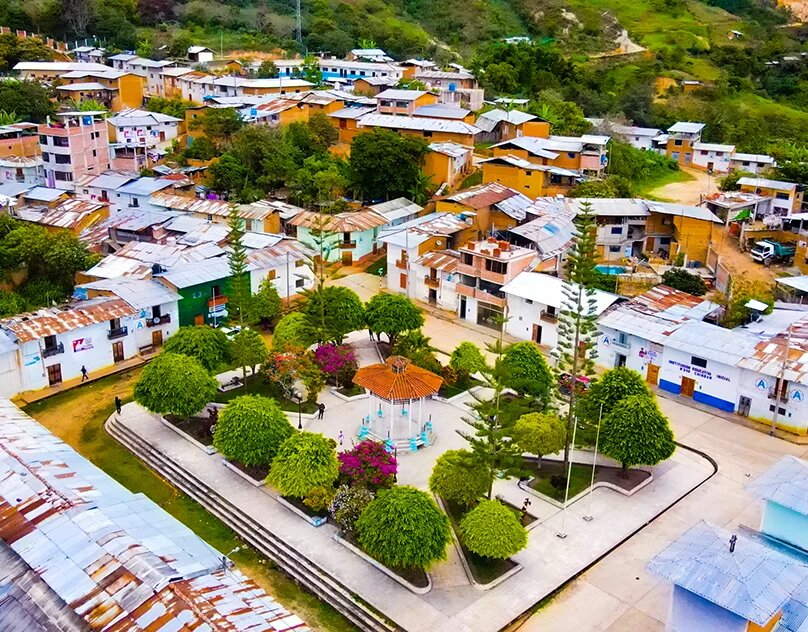
The Chimbán District from an overhead view

Chimban District is one of nineteen districts of the province Chota in Peru.
