= Bambamarca, Peru =

Bambamarca
- Town
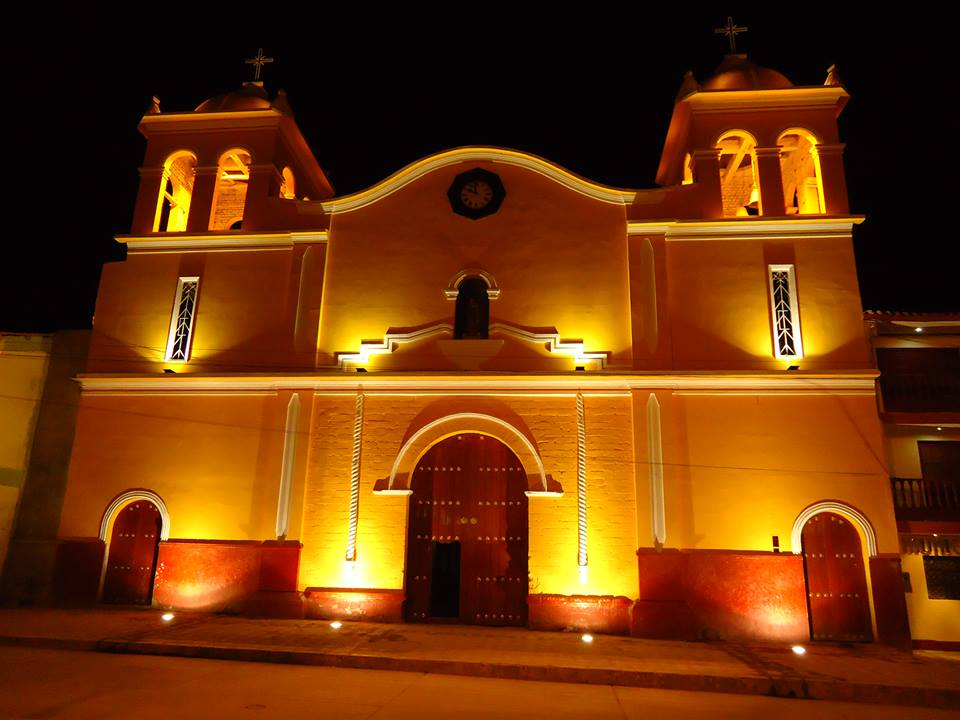

- Location within Peru
- Country: Peru
- Region: Cajamarca
- Province: Hualgayoc
- District: Bambamarca
- Time zone: UTC-5 (PET)

Bambamarca is a town in Northern Peru, capital of the province Hualgayoc in the region Cajamarca.

== Geography ==
=== Climate ===
Climate data for Bambamarca
Month	Jan	Feb	Mar	Apr	May	Jun	Jul	Aug	Sep	Oct	Nov	Dec	Year
Daily mean °F	59.5	58.5	58.5	58.5	57.6	56.1	55.8	56.3	57.4	58.6	58.3	58.3	57.8
Daily mean °C	15.3	14.7	14.7	14.7	14.2	13.4	13.2	13.5	14.1	14.8	14.6	14.6	14.3
Source: climate-data.org
