= Karelim López =

Peruvian businesswoman and lobbyist

- Born: April 18, 1980 (age 44); Jesús María District, Lima, Peru
- Occupation: Lobbyist
- Partner: Jonny Milla Cornejo

Karelim Lisbeth López Arredondo (born 18 April 1980) is a Peruvian businesswoman and lobbyist known for controversial interactions with the governments of Presidents of Peru Martín Vizcarra and Pedro Castillo.

== Early life ==
López was born in the Jesús María District, Lima on 18 April 1980. According to América Televisión, López did not receive a university education, though her friends noted that she was well-informed on laws in Peru.

== Career ==
=== Congress and Ministry of Transport and Communications ===
López began her career as a lobbyist for the Congress of the Republic of Peru in 2003, often working with Aprista politicians. While lobbying in Congress, she would meet her husband Jonny Milla Cornejo, who was a security agent for legislators.

She then turned to lobby in the Ministry of Transport and Communications under the government of President Alan García, working with Enrique Cornejo from 2008 to 2011, establishing a friendly relationship with him. In 2014, she contributed 14,160 soles towards Cornejo's mayoral campaign through her Threejots S.A.C. company. During the 2016 Peruvian general election, López would donate 16,000 soles towards the presidential campaign of Keiko Fujimori, daughter of former president Alberto Fujimori.

In 2017 during the tenure of President Pedro Pablo Kuczynski, López introduced Vice President of Peru and Minister of Transport and Communications Martín Vizcarra to a medium she had worked with, Hayimy Aleman Herrera, with Vizcarra and Hayimy meeting on multiple occasions. López would also establish a relationship to the General Commander of the National Police of Peru, José Luis Lavalle Santa Cruz, who would deploy National Police resources for her, often providing police escorts for her quick transportation through Lima.

=== Vizcarra government ===
Through her connections in the Government Palace, especially President Vizcarra's secretary Karem Roca, López attempted to gain influence within the Vizcarra government according to IDL-Reporteros. Beginning her relationship with Roca, López reportedly purchased an Apple iPhone for the secretary, saying the reason was for the two to communicate better, and would allegedly later pay for a liposuction surgery for Roca. According to IDL-Reporteros, López was introduced to President Vizcarra in late 2018 by Karem Roca and Iván Manchego, with the two saying she "had access to important sources". When interactions between López and President Vizcarra began, López allegedly sent false documents to target General Secretary of the Presidency Mirian Morales, with Vizcarra ordering the National Directorate of Intelligence to review the documents purportedly belonging to Morales that they determined to false information by the agency. President Vizcarra would later dismiss the incident as a personal dispute and ignored further investigation into the conflict. According to La República, President Vizcarra would nominate Carlos Lozada Contreras, a relative to the owners of construction company Termirex, as Minister of Transport and Communications. López worked as a lobbyist for Terminex and the company would later win the Tarata III Bridge Consortium contract worth 255.9 million soles under the Castillo administration.

López attempted to influence Richard Cisneros, a singer who was the subject of alleged irregular payments related to the first impeachment process against Martín Vizcarra according to IDL-Reporteros. A source with close information linked to Vizcarra said that López was the individual that brought the information about Cisneros to opposition lawmaker Edgar Alarcon, with the legislator publicly releasing audios related to the controversy to accuse Vizcarra of "moral incapacity". It was reported that López planned the audio controversy after being unhappy that she did not receive a construction contract for the 2019 Pan American Games. President Vizcarra would later be removed from office in 2020.

=== Castillo government ===
During the 2021 Peruvian general election, it was reported that López initially supported the candidacy of Keiko Fujimori, though she later became close to individuals in the government of Pedro Castillo. Presented in visitor documents as a lobbyist for the construction company Termirex, López met with Castillo's chief of staff Bruno Pacheco multiple times. Four months into Castillo's term, his former presidential challenger Keiko Fujimori announced on 19 November 2021 that her party was pushing forward impeachment proceedings, arguing that Castillo was "morally unfit for office" and investigators raided the Government Palace during an influence peddling investigation and found that Pacheco had US$20,000 present in his office's bathroom.

In December 2021, López was ordered by the Prosecutor's Office of Peru to remain in the country due to allegations of influence peddling. López was represented by her attorney César Nakazaki, the same attorney for Alberto Fujimori. López's husband and daughter were later reported to be investigated for money laundering.

== Personal life ==
López lives with her husband Jonny Milla Cornejo, with the two having one daughter named Yadira Milla López. She owns one home in the Pueblo Libre District that she purchased for $170,000 in cash and two other homes in Breña, with one purchased directly $120,000. She also reportedly owns several vehicles, including a Dodge Durango, Ford Expedition and a BMW X6.

According to a criminal prosecutor's documents, López reported that "for more than 14 years" she was "addicted" to Tarot card readings. IDL-Reporteros reported that between 2017 and 2020, she spent over $10,000 and made 300 deposits for medium consultations that ranged between $50 and $125 per session. In late 2020, López accused her closest medium of stealing a package containing $50,000 from her, though the medium said that López intentionally left the package at her house for safeguard and that police later arrived asking for the package.
