= Bambamarca District, Hualgayoc =

Coordinates: 6.6812°S 78.5220°W

Bambamarca Pampamarka
- District
- Interactive map of Bambamarca
- Country: Peru
- Region: Cajamarca
- Province: Hualgayoc
- Capital: Bambamarca

Government
  - Mayor: Esteban Campos Benavides

Area
  - Total: 451.38 km^{2} (174.28 sq mi)
- Elevation: 2,526 m (8,287 ft)

Population (2005 census)
  - Total: 74,513
  - Density: 165.08/km^{2} (427.55/sq mi)
- Time zone: UTC-5 (PET)
- UBIGEO: 060701

Bambamarca District is one of three districts of the province Hualgayoc in Peru, with 167 pueblos. The area is rich in mineral reserves and mining prospects, including the Conga Project, which is threatening to affect water resources such as the Namocoha lake.
