= Conchán District =

Coordinates: 6.4433°S 78.6561°W

Conchan
- District
- Interactive map of Conchan
- Country: Peru
- Region: Cajamarca
- Province: Chota
- Founded: November 04, 1889
- Capital: Conchan

Government
  - Mayor: Fabriciano Delgado Tantalean

Area
  - Total: 180.23 km^{2} (69.59 sq mi)
- Elevation: 2,400 m (7,900 ft)

Population (2005 census)
  - Total: 6,939
  - Density: 38.50/km^{2} (99.72/sq mi)
- Time zone: UTC-5 (PET)
- UBIGEO: 060408

Conchan District is one of nineteen districts of the province Chota in Peru.
