= Choropampa District =

Coordinates: 7.2871°S 78.5743°W

Choropampa
- District
- Interactive map of Choropampa
- Country: Peru
- Region: Cajamarca
- Province: Chota
- Founded: December 12, 1991
- Capital: Choropampa

Government
  - Mayor: Artemio Uriarte Vasquez

Area
  - Total: 171.59 km^{2} (66.25 sq mi)
- Elevation: 2,850 m (9,350 ft)

Population (2005 census)
  - Total: 3,480
  - Density: 20.3/km^{2} (52.5/sq mi)
- Time zone: UTC-5 (PET)
- UBIGEO: 060406
- Website: munichoropampa.gob.pe

Choropampa District is one of nineteen districts of the Chota Province, Peru. It is located in the Northern Peruvian highlands and renowned for its gold reserves, with South America's largest goldmine operations.

An elemental mercury spill occurred in June 2000 along a road that passed through the three villages Choropampa, Magdalena and San Juan from a truck contracted by Yanacocha mining; the Compliance/Advisor Ombudsman of the International Finance Corporation /Multilateral Investment Guarantee Agency investigated, as described in the 2006 exit report.
