= Poonawalla =

Poonawalla or Poonawala is an Indian (Parsi/Dawoodi Bohra/Khoja) toponymic surname for someone from Pune (formerly Poona) in India. It may refer to:

- Adar Poonawalla, (born 1981), Indian businessman
- Cyrus S. Poonawalla, Indian businessman
- Ismail Poonawala (born 1937), Indian professor of Arabic
- Lila Poonawalla, (born 1944), Indian industrialist
- Natasha Poonawalla, (born 1981), Indian philanthropist
- Riaz Poonawala (born 1961), Indian cricketer

== See also ==
- Poona (disambiguation)
