= Llama District, Chota =

Coordinates: 6.5142°S 79.1194°W

Llama
- District
- Interactive map of Llama
- Country: Peru
- Region: Cajamarca
- Province: Chota
- Founded: April 18, 1835
- Capital: Llama

Government
  - Mayor: Fredesvindo Mejia Diaz

Area
  - Total: 494.94 km^{2} (191.10 sq mi)
- Elevation: 2,095 m (6,873 ft)

Population (2005 census)
  - Total: 7,601
  - Density: 15.36/km^{2} (39.78/sq mi)
- Time zone: UTC-5 (PET)
- UBIGEO: 060411

Llama District is one of nineteen districts of the province Chota in Peru.
