= Miracosta District =

Coordinates: 6.3463°S 79.3426°W

Miracosta Distrito de Miracosta Cachén Santiago de Cachén Katchen
- District
- Miracosta District
- Interactive map of Miracosta
- Country: Peru
- Region: Cajamarca
- Province: Chota
- Named for: Santiago (apostle) (1559)
- Capital: Miracosta

Area
  - Total: 415.69 km^{2} (160.50 sq mi)
- Elevation: 2,990 m (9,810 ft)

Population (2005 census)
  - Total: 3,144
  - Density: 7.563/km^{2} (19.59/sq mi)
- Time zone: UTC-5 (PET)
- UBIGEO: 060412

Miracosta District is one of nineteen districts of the province Chota in Peru.
