= Hualgayoc province =

Coordinates: 6°40′48″S 78°31′48″W

Hualgayoc
- Province
- Coat of arms

- Location of Hualgayoc in the Cajamarca Region
- Country: Peru
- Region: Cajamarca
- Capital: Bambamarca

Government
  - Mayor: Esteban Campos Benavides

Area
  - Total: 777.25 km^{2} (300.10 sq mi)
- Elevation: 2,526 m (8,287 ft)

Population
  - Total: 94,076
  - Density: 121.04/km^{2} (313.48/sq mi)
- UBIGEO: 0607
- Website: www.munibambamarca.gob.pe

Hualgayoc is a province of the Cajamarca Region in Peru. The capital of the province is the city of Bambamarca.

== Political division ==
The province measures 777.15 square kilometres (300.06 sq mi) and is divided into three districts:

District	Capital	Mayor
Bambamarca	Bambamarca	Esteban Campos Benavides
Chugur	Chugur	Vidal Garcia Efus
Hualgayoc	Hualgayoc	Ismael Becerra
