= Chadín District =

Coordinates: 6.4719°S 78.4190°W

Chadín
- District
- Interactive map of Chadín
- Country: Peru
- Region: Cajamarca
- Province: Chota
- Founded: September 18, 1942
- Capital: Chadin

Government
  - Mayor: José Cruz Rodriguez Rodriguez

Area
  - Total: 66.53 km^{2} (25.69 sq mi)
- Elevation: 2,350 m (7,710 ft)

Population (2005 census)
  - Total: 4,344
  - Density: 65.29/km^{2} (169.1/sq mi)
- Time zone: UTC-5 (PET)
- UBIGEO: 060403

Chadín District is one of nineteen districts of the province Chota in Peru.
