= Chiguirip District =

Coordinates: 6.4296°S 78.7221°W

Chiguirip
- District
- Interactive map of Chiguirip
- Country: Peru
- Region: Cajamarca
- Province: Chota
- Founded: October 31, 1896
- Capital: Chiguirip

Government
  - Mayor: Joel Ysaias Quispe Nuñez

Area
  - Total: 51.44 km^{2} (19.86 sq mi)
- Elevation: 2,650 m (8,690 ft)

Population (2005 census)
  - Total: 5,106
  - Density: 99.26/km^{2} (257.1/sq mi)
- Time zone: UTC-5 (PET)
- UBIGEO: 060404

Chiguirip District is one of nineteen districts of the province Chota in Peru.
