= Pune (disambiguation) =

Pune, formerly Poona or Poonah, is a city in Maharashtra, India.

It may also refer to:

- Pune division
- Pune district
- Pune Camp
- Pune railway division
- Pune Junction railway station
- Pune Airport
- Pune F.C.
- Savitribai Phule Pune University
- Pune Warriors India (2011–2013), cricket team
- Rising Pune Supergiant (2016–2017), cricket team

== See also ==
- Poona (disambiguation)
- Pun (disambiguation)
