= Yenifer Paredes =

Peruvian politician (born 1995)

Member of the Chamber of Deputies
- Incumbent
- Assumed office 26 July 2026
- Constituency: Cajamarca

Personal details
- Born: 5 December 1995 (age 30)
- Party: Together for Peru
- Relatives: Lilia Paredes (sister); Pedro Castillo (brother-in-law)

Yenifer Noelia Paredes Navarro (born 5 December 1995) is a Peruvian politician serving as a member of the Chamber of Deputies since 2026. She is the sister of Lilia Paredes and the sister-in-law of Pedro Castillo.
