= Cochabamba District, Chota =

Coordinates: 6.4739°S 78.8858°W

Cochabamba Quchapampa
- District
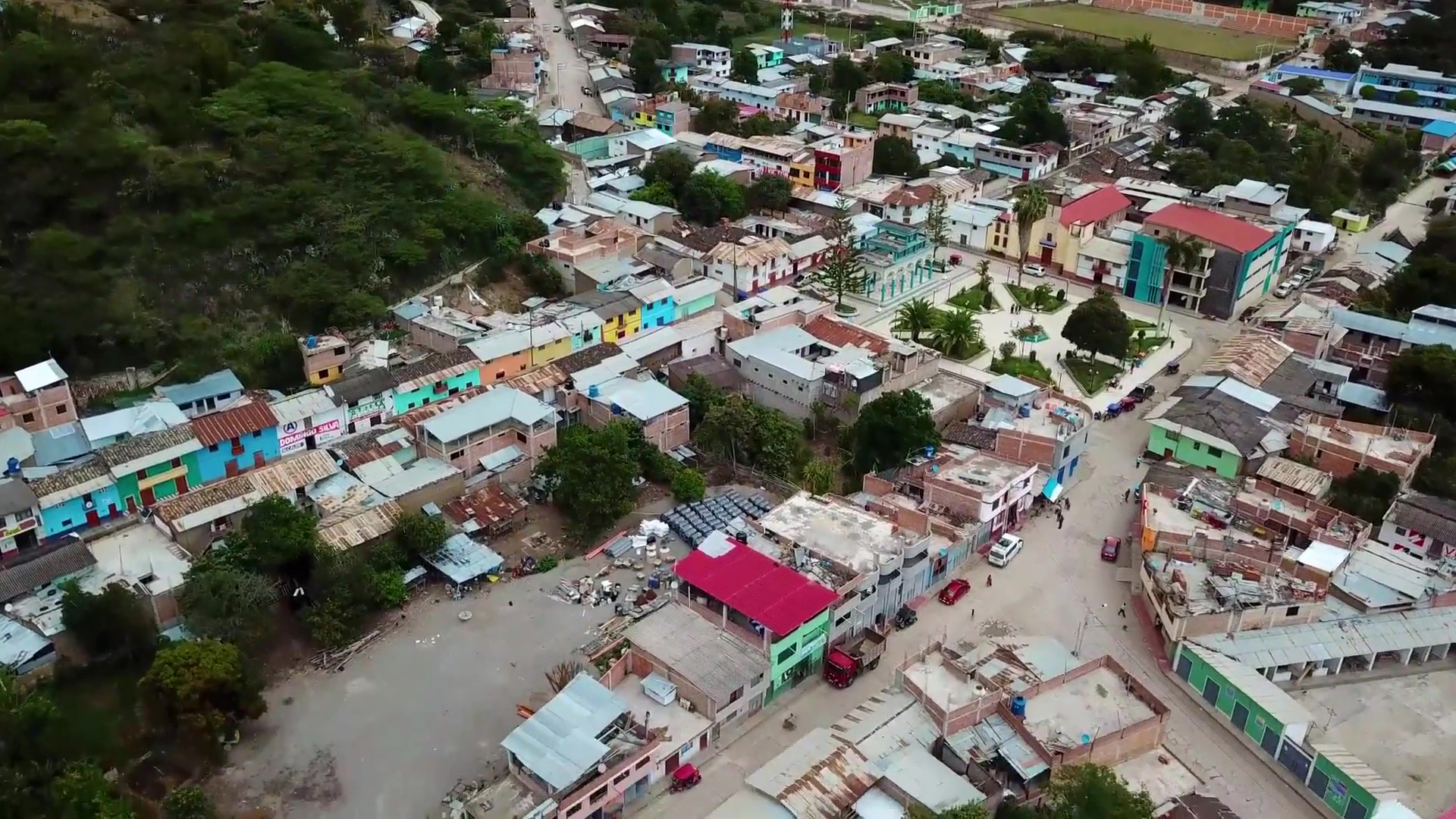
- Interactive map of Cochabamba
- Country: Peru
- Region: Cajamarca
- Province: Chota
- Founded: January 02, 1857
- Capital: Cochabamba

Government
  - Mayor: Julio Walter Villalobos Flores

Area
  - Total: 130.01 km^{2} (50.20 sq mi)
- Elevation: 1,667 m (5,469 ft)

Population (2005 census)
  - Total: 7,098
  - Density: 54.60/km^{2} (141.4/sq mi)
- Time zone: UTC-5 (PET)
- UBIGEO: 060407

Cochabamba District is one of nineteen districts of the province Chota in Peru.
