= Pión District =

Coordinates: 6.1785°S 78.4818°W

Pión
- District
- Interactive map of Pión
- Country: Peru
- Region: Cajamarca
- Province: Chota
- Founded: January 2, 1857
- Capital: Pion

Government
  - Mayor: Jorge Cieza Alarcon

Area
  - Total: 141.05 km^{2} (54.46 sq mi)
- Elevation: 1,600 m (5,200 ft)

Population (2005 census)
  - Total: 1,847
  - Density: 13.09/km^{2} (33.91/sq mi)
- Time zone: UTC-5 (PET)
- UBIGEO: 060414

Pión District is one of nineteen districts of the province Chota in Peru.
