= Bruno Pacheco (politician) =

Peruvian educator, politician and fugitive

Secretary General of the Presidency of Peru
- In office 29 July 2021 – 23 November 2021
- President: Pedro Castillo
- Preceded by: Félix Pino Figueroa
- Succeeded by: Carlos Jaico Carranza

Personal details
- Born: Arnulfo Bruno Pacheco Castillo; 5 February 1970 (age 56)
- Party: We Are Peru (2009-present)
- Occupation: Teacher and politician

Arnulfo Bruno Pacheco Castillo (born 5 February 1970) is a Peruvian politician and former presidential secretary of Peru. He served in that position and as presidential chief of staff under Peruvian President Pedro Castillo. During 2022, Pacheco was a fugitive, but on 25 July of that year, he surrendered to authorities.

== Early life ==
Pacheco was born in Lima. He studied education and became a teacher at Peru's high school level, teaching biology and chemistry there since 1998. He also taught physical education, financial math and technical design at Peru's Chorillos Military School. During 2009, he decided to launch his political career, joining the Peruvian party, Somos Peru.

== Legal troubles ==
According to IDL-Reporteros, Pacheco used his closeness to President Castillo without the president's knowledge, with a Government Palace insider telling IDL that the president was indecisive while political aides used his name for their own interests. During November 2021, Peruvian prosecutors ("Fiscalia de la Nacion") found the sum of $20,000 dollars inside the office that Pacheco occupied as presidential secretary. Pacheco alleged that the amount of money found was part of his salary as secretary and of some savings he had accumulated. The finding of the money took place after, earlier that month, general Jose Vizcarra Alvarez declared that Pacheco, as well as president Castillo and defence minister Walter Ayala had asked him to help promote two colonels to higher rankings in the Peruvian Army.

On 11 April 2022, Pacheco appeared on national television in Peru, saying that he had received both threats and offers to bear witness in favor of certain government groups, without specifying which of those groups he referred to. The next day, judge Manuel Antonio Chuyo ordered Pacheco to serve a 36 months sentence of preventive prison time and also asked for his capture. Pacheco soon appealed the 36 months sentence.

On Monday, 18 April 2022, Pacheco's lawyer, William Paco Castillo, announced he would no longer defend the fugitive. Paco Castillo said that Pacheco had evidence that proved his innocence but was withholding it from investigators, and that after speaking to Pacheco, the lawyer and his client had decided that they would split over some disagreements between the two. Lawyer Paco Castillo also said that Pacheco does not want to be helped.

On 10 May, Lima's supreme court lowered Pacheco's sentence to 24 months instead of the 36 originally imposed to him.

Peruvian authorities obtained an order of arrest against Pacheco and against Peru's former minister of transportation, Juan Silva. On 17 May, the order against Pacheco became an international order of arrest against him and against another co-defendant, Fray Vazquez Castillo, as the Peruvian National Police feared they might have escaped to another country.

=== Arrest ===
On 25 July 2022, Pacheco gave himself up to authorities and was arrested at a house in Chorrillos. He was arrested by Harvey Colchado and taken by the "Equipo Especial de Fiscales Contra la Corrupcion en el Poder" ("Prosecutors' Special Team Against Top Government Corruption" or "EEFCCP"), after three days of dealings with that team.

His arrest was announced publicly by Peru's Attorney General, Patricia Benavides.

=== Alleged connections ===
Pacheco is also suspected of having personal connections to other people with political power in Peru, namely Vladimir Meza and Fernando Manrique, the latter of which who is a nephew of former President of Peru, Alejandro Toledo.

=== Panorama show allegation ===
The Peruvian television show, Panorama, alleged that until 17 February 2022, the Peruvian Police knew where Pacheco was located and that documents demonstrated that Pacheco was living at Ate District in Lima. The police then lost track of Pacheco, until he was arrested on 25 July.

=== 2024 ===
As of 2024, Pacheco was involved in another controversy in Peru, this time concerning an investigation by Peru's supreme prosecutor, Delia Espinoza, against SUNAT's former superintendent Luis Enrique Vera Castillo.

=== Karelim López ===
Peruvian businesswoman Karelim López is also involved in the scandal and investigations. On 17 July 2022, she declared to Peruvian television channel, America TV, that she believed Pacheco was withholding evidence that could implicate president Pedro Castillo in the scandal and that would prove Pacheco's innocence, and that Pacheco was being helped escape the police by the country's government.

== Personal life ==
Pacheco is a supporter of the Peru national football team.

=== Health problems ===
He has diabetes, hypertension and heart problems related to a left-sided mitral valve.

== See also ==
- List of Peruvians
