= Huambos District =

Coordinates: 6.4521°S 78.9602°W

Huambos Wamp'u
- District
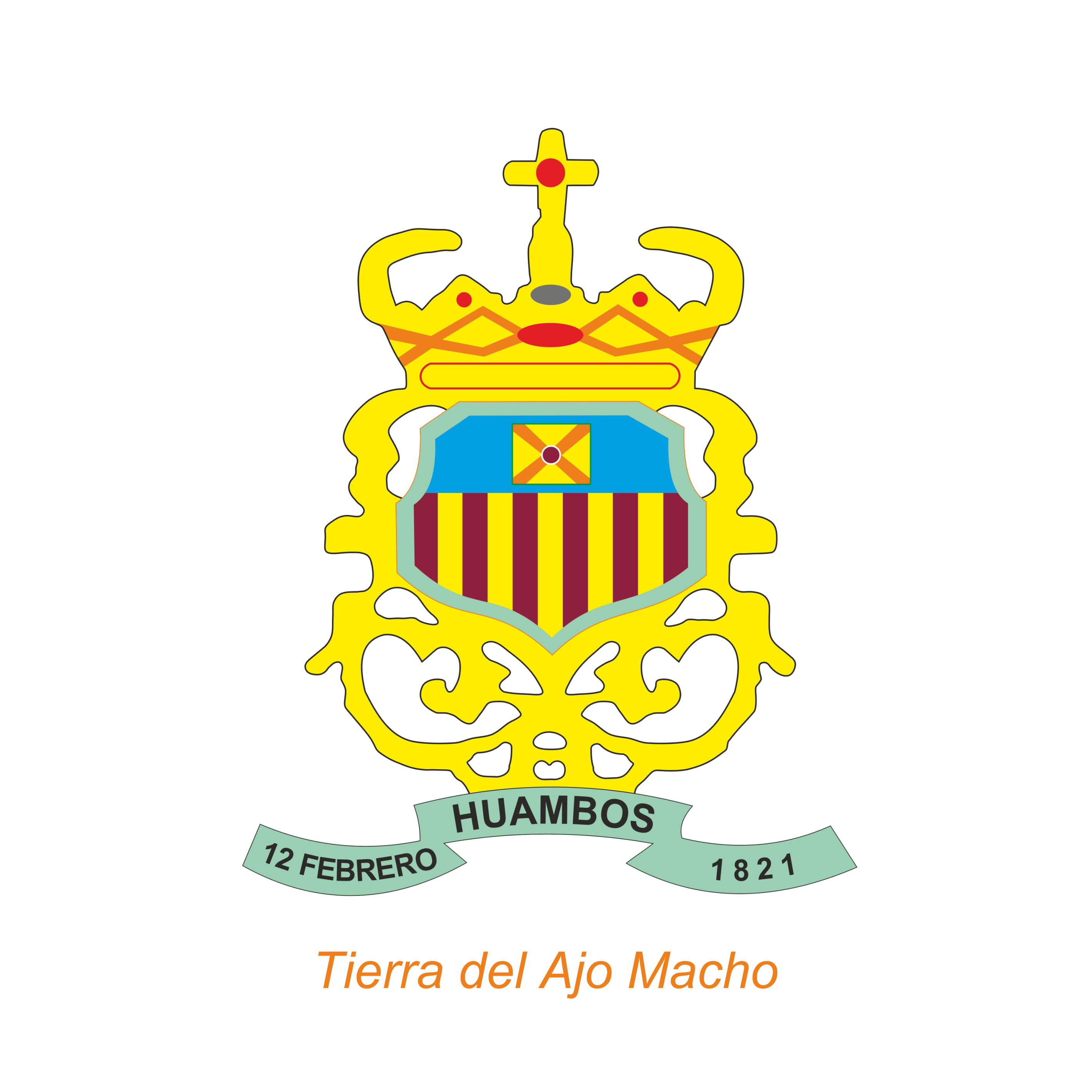
- SHIELD OF THE DISTRICT OF HUAMBOS
- Interactive map of Huambos
- Country: Peru
- Region: Cajamarca
- Province: Chota
- Capital: Huambos

Government
  - Mayor: Redublino Bustamante Coronel

Area
  - Total: 240.72 km^{2} (92.94 sq mi)
- Elevation: 2,276 m (7,467 ft)

Population (2005 census)
  - Total: 9,708
  - Density: 40.33/km^{2} (104.5/sq mi)
- Time zone: UTC-5 (PET)
- UBIGEO: 060409

Huambos District is one of nineteen districts of the province Chota in Peru.
