= Poona (disambiguation) =

Poona, Poonah or Pune is a metropolis in Maharashtra, India.

Poona may also refer to:

== Places ==
- Poona, Queensland, Australia, a town and locality
- Poona Dam, Queensland, Australia
- Poona National Park, Queensland, Australia
- Roman Catholic Diocese of Poona, Pune, India
- Poona (crater), an impact crater on Mars

== Military ==
- Battle of Poona, an 1802 battle fought near Pune, India, by rival factions of the Maratha empire
- Poona (Independent) Brigade, redesignated the 7th Indian Infantry Brigade in 1939
- RAF Poona, a World War II airfield, now Pune Airport, Pune, India

== Other uses ==
- University of Poona, former name of Savitribai Phule Pune University, Pune, India
- Poona Ford (born 1995), American football player
- Poona, a competitive sport from which badminton has its origin
- Poonah (ship)

== See also ==
- Poona Pact, an agreement reached in 1932 by B. R. Ambedkar and M. K. Gandhi for fair representation of Indian depressed classes in legislative assemblies of British India
- Poonawalla, an Indian surname
- Puna (disambiguation)
- Pune (disambiguation)
- Poon (disambiguation)
