= Paccha District, Chota =

Coordinates: 6.4971°S 78.4230°W

Paccha
- District
- Interactive map of Paccha
- Country: Peru
- Region: Cajamarca
- Province: Chota
- Founded: January 02, 1857
- Capital: Paccha

Government
  - Mayor: Leoncio Ruiz Vera

Area
  - Total: 93.97 km^{2} (36.28 sq mi)
- Elevation: 2,250 m (7,380 ft)

Population (2005 census)
  - Total: 5,155
  - Density: 54.86/km^{2} (142.1/sq mi)
- Time zone: UTC-5 (PET)
- UBIGEO: 060413

Paccha District is one of nineteen districts of the province Chota in Peru.
