= San Juan de Licupis District =

Coordinates: 7.2914°S 78.4973°W

San Juan de Licupis
- District
- Interactive map of San Juan de Licupis
- Country: Peru
- Region: Cajamarca
- Province: Chota
- Founded: September 11, 1987
- Capital: Licupis

Government
  - Mayor: Marin Wilfredo Manay Saenz

Area
  - Total: 205.01 km^{2} (79.15 sq mi)
- Elevation: 3,030 m (9,940 ft)

Population (2020 census)
  - Total: 977
  - Density: 4.77/km^{2} (12.3/sq mi)
- Time zone: UTC-5 (PET)
- UBIGEO: 060416

San Juan de Licupis District is one of nineteen districts of the province Chota in Peru.
