= Lajas District =

Coordinates: 6.5608°S 78.7362°W

Lajas
- District
- Interactive map of Lajas
- Country: Peru
- Region: Cajamarca
- Province: Chota
- Founded: January 2, 1857
- Capital: Lajas

Government
  - Mayor: José Eduard Alarcón Bustamante

Area
  - Total: 120.73 km^{2} (46.61 sq mi)
- Elevation: 2,134 m (7,001 ft)

Population (2017)
  - Total: 11,093
  - Density: 91.883/km^{2} (237.98/sq mi)
- Time zone: UTC-5 (PET)
- UBIGEO: 060410

Lajas District is one of nineteen districts of the province Chota in Peru. The main provincial town is Lajas, home to an estimated 4,000 people. There is a significant population of Spanish ancestry. The town carnivals are celebrated in July.

== See also ==
- Kuntur Qaqa
