= Poon =

Poon may refer to:

- Poon, a variation of Pun (surname), is a surname from South Asia and East Asia.
- Poon, Romanization variant of Pan (surname), an East Asian surname
- Po-on, a 1984 novel by Filipino author F. Sionil José
- Poon (county), a former county in Kwangtung (Guangdong), China
- Poon Lim (1918–1991), formerly missing person at sea
- Several trees in the genus Calophyllum

== See also ==
- Poona (disambiguation)
