= Tocmoche District =

Coordinates: 6.4124°S 79.3611°W

Tocmoche
- District
- Interactive map of Tocmoche
- Country: Peru
- Region: Cajamarca
- Province: Chota
- Founded: September 18, 1942
- Capital: Tocmoche

Government
  - Mayor: Leli Barreto Quiroz

Area
  - Total: 222.38 km^{2} (85.86 sq mi)
- Elevation: 1,248 m (4,094 ft)

Population (2005 census)
  - Total: 914
  - Density: 4.11/km^{2} (10.6/sq mi)
- Time zone: UTC-5 (PET)
- UBIGEO: 060418

Tocmoche District is one of nineteen districts of the province Chota in Peru.
