= Chalamarca District =

Coordinates: 6.5042°S 78.4806°W

Chalamarca
- District
- Interactive map of Chalamarca
- Country: Peru
- Region: Cajamarca
- Province: Chota
- Founded: May 23, 1995
- Capital: Chalamarca

Area
  - Total: 179.74 km^{2} (69.40 sq mi)
- Elevation: 2,400 m (7,900 ft)

Population (2005 census)
  - Total: 11,617
  - Density: 64.632/km^{2} (167.40/sq mi)
- Time zone: UTC-5 (PET)
- UBIGEO: 060419

Chalamarca District is one of nineteen districts of the province Chota in Peru.
