= Condorcaga =

Archaeological site in Peru

- Location within Peru
- 06°30′40.09″S 78°43′9.53″W
- Type: Settlement
- Location: Peru; Chota Province, Cajamarca

History
- Built by: Chavín culture

Condorcaga (possibly from Quechua kuntur condor, qaqa rock) is an archaeological zone in the region of Cajamarca, in Peru. It is situated in the Chota Province, Lajas District. Condorcaga is also a natural viewpoint. In the upper part of the mountain there are rock formations.
