= Rodolfo González Cruz =

Cuban-Peruvian evangelical pastor and missionary

The Reverend Rodolfo González Cruz

Personal life
- Born: Rodolfo González Cruz; July 28, 1937 Camagüey Province, Cuba
- Education: University of Havana
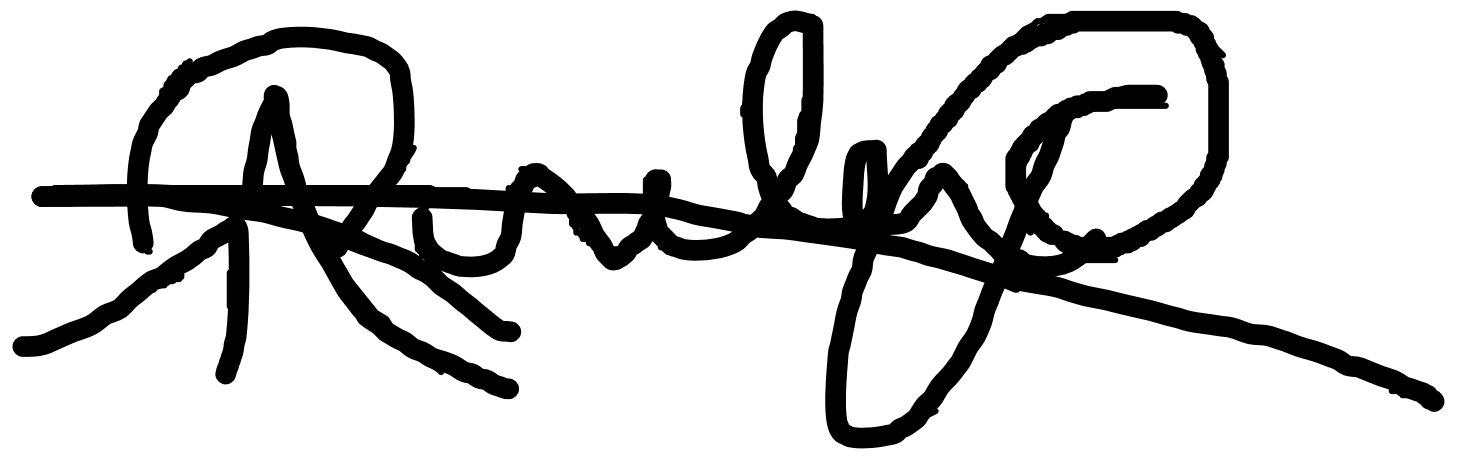
- Signature

Religious life
- Religion: Christianity (evangelical Protestantism)
- Denomination: Pentecost
- Church: Worldwide Missionary Movement
- Profession: Evangelist

President of Worldwide Missionary Movement in Peru
- In office 1984–2021
- Preceded by: Post established
- Succeeded by: Luis Meza Bocanegra

Treasurer of the Worldwide Missionary Movement
- In office 1995–2018
- Preceded by: Rúben Sosa
- Succeeded by: Gustavo Martínez

Rodolfo González Cruz (Camagüey Province, July 28, 1937) is a Cuban–Peruvian evangelical pastor, missionary and writer, also known for his business ventures and his support for political causes. He was the founder of the Worldwide Missionary Movement in Peru. An anti-communist and a defender of youth and marriage, for which he was recognized by various Peruvian authorities. The works he promoted included an international media network, Bethel Television, and a radio network known as Bethel Radio, of which He was president and promoter of these two chains named in one, Bethel Communications, he installed commercial establishments for the sale of books with Christian foundations designated as Altamira Investments. He founded schools, institutions and educational communities called International Elim, aligned to theological bases, located in different urban and regional venues of the Peruvian territory globally called Elim Educational Association.

González was born in the province of Camagüey. When he was a teenager, he converted to Christianity and after a good time as a worker he dedicated himself to ministering in various regions of the Cuban country, through radio communication, reaching national prominence within the Pentecostal Christian Church of Cuba, an organization through which he assumed the presidency until the mid-1960s, when he joined Puerto Rican evangelist Luis M. Ortiz. In 1967, he was convicted by the Cuban Government on the grounds of his evangelization and received a three-year sentence. González evangelized throughout his prison stay and when he was secretly released for a decade. In 1981, he arrived in Peru and founded the Pentecostal Christian Church of the Worldwide Missionary Movement, based on conservative and family-oriented teachings based on new interpretations of the Bible.

In 1984 he was appointed president of the organization. Since assuming the presidency, González had been characterized by his Pentecostal preaching focused on theocentrism. In the mid-1990s, he would join the international board of the Worldwide Missionary Movement. He was criticized for economic abundance through tithes and offerings, his relationship with politics, including Keiko Fujimori, and was targeted by the prosecution after listening to an audio related to a speech that encouraged "killing homosexuals". Within the organization he began to install temples, annexes and establish workers in different regions of the South American country to fulfill the universal apostolic mandate. In his missionary perspective, he began to carry out campaigns and conventions for preaching, being one of his most notable works due to the large number of people converted to Christianity within the history of the World Missionary Movement in Peru. With the advancement of the media, a prominent televangelism focused on the believer's repentance began.

González was a key leader of the revival within the Christian organization that he instituted in Peru; Most of the converts come from the popular sectors of the Andean region, as well as some of them are ex-criminal prisoners who entered in search of rehabilitation.

At the end of the ten years of the new millennium he would leave his international position within the organization. González would continue preaching from his temple established decades ago, standing out in most of his speeches for his fundamental bases of the Holy Scriptures and with a good doctrinal standard which allowed him to spread a teaching full of inspiration for the members of the World Missionary Movement. After several decades of ministry, González left the presidential position to the Peruvian evangelical pastor Luis Meza Bocanegra and his temple to the theologian and missionary Luis Meza Bocanegra.

== Early years ==
Rodolfo González Cruz was born on July 28, 1937, in the agricultural area of the province of Camagüey, Cuba, being the second of the four children of the marriage formed by Manuel González and Juana Cruz.

During his childhood, Rodolfo González grew up in a home with average conditions. During his childhood he studied elementary school in his hometown, along with his studies, he was taught under the beliefs of the Catholic Church; however, he did not read the Holy Scriptures affecting his spiritual life. At the age of 12, together with his family, they moved to the city of Camagüey where he studied and finished his secondary studies. After graduating and leaving school, he decided to study engineering and also dedicated himself to the world of business.

In 1951 during a series of revival campaigns in his hometown led by Tommy Lee Osborn, an American evangelical preacher. González converted when he was 15 years old, he himself confessed years later he had religious appearances that motivated him to commit himself as a preacher. After his conversion from Catholicism he established himself as a member of a youth group of a local evangelical church, where three months later he would receive the baptism in the Holy Ghost on a bus on the way to a fellowship. After this experience, González evangelized in prisons and hospitals, in the latter he handed out brochures and prayed for the sick. At the same time, I would mention the abundance of tuberculosis in Cuba, causing too many fatalities – family members and close friends – at the national level.

== Ministry ==
=== Beginnings and campaigns ===
He initially served briefly as a laborer in Cuba; however, when he was there, he received the divine call indicating his beginning as a pastor. His initial intention was to follow the gospel as a worker doing evangelization work. After five years of service in 1956, González came to attend a fellowship in Santiago de Cuba, joining the religious leader, Luis M. Ortiz, appointing him pastor in Camagüey and later in Placetas where he planned to build a temple that would not materialize due to a prohibition of the government. González with a group of pastors and members of the Assemblies of God. He developed his work from Santiago de Cuba in the eastern part of the country, his theology in this church was extremely conservative within a traditional Pentecostalism. After the Triumph of the Revolution on January 1, 1959, two years later and with the departure of Ortiz and other leaders, the church took a course of greater theological openness and ecumenical tendencies. Along with Ortiz, he went to his native country and returned to found a new work in Santiago de Cuba. They were joined by José Rivera Montalvo and Milton Donato who had an independent congregation in Bayamo. The following year they held a convention to inaugurate the denomination that bears that name.

It began to grow autonomously, without any connection to missions abroad. In this denomination he consolidated his work, preaching the need for a life without vices, austere and at the same time separated from social and political affairs, for which he denied his pastors the possibility of being employed in secular work. González also received support from Avelino González, a radio preacher, who, together with his wife, Ofelia Zorrilla, organized a church in Havana's Chinatown. Together with the person who was later president of the denomination, Pastor Francisco Martínez Luis, who had been chaplain of the Rebel Army, they preached to make their faithful aware of an approach to the Revolution, joining the tasks of the same, his mass organizations, volunteer work and promoting unity with other churches through the ecumenical movement during the 1960s. He later joined the Cuban Council of Churches (former Ecumenical Council) and established fraternal links with the Disciples of Christ of the United States, without affecting its Pentecostal theology. For a long time its main leader was the pastor and teacher Avelino González. Its founder left Cuba and the church was reorganized under Cuban leadership.

Along with his stay as a pastor in Cuba, from 1957 he would lead the radio program "Pentecostal Revival", a medium that allowed him to evangelize for six years. In 1963 the World Missionary Movement would be founded in Trujillo Alto, a neighborhood of San Juan, by the evangelical pastor Luis Magín Ortiz Marrero. His reason for the creation arose, according to the movement, in "not conditioning with other ideologies of his country" when he was imprisoned in Cuba. Two years later, he would assume the national presidency of the Pentecostal Christian Church of Cuba.

In 1967 he is taken prisoner by the socialist government of Cuba for the reason of his evangelization after several warnings to his person; however, he would continue his evangelistic work inside the prison for three years. Upon leaving prison with the condition of not preaching, the religious leader would ignore that rule and return to missionary work secretly for ten years, when the government allowed evangelizing in Cuban territory, González resumed his pastoral work as usual. Years later, he would personally say that he was taken in procession and twice to the firing squad, saving himself on those occasions.

=== Arrival to Peru and main position as religious leader ===
Rodolfo Gonzáles Cruz would arrive in Peruvian territory on March 25, 1981. He began to hold prayer services in the San Juan de Miraflores District. With the intention of visiting the ministry in Villa María del Triunfo, in January 1983 his colleague Luis M. Ortiz, at that time president of the World Missionary Movement, would arrive in Peru. On the night of January 27, he publicly declared that he was going to look for a movie theater to turn it into a House of God. A few days later, he visited the office of Mr. José Poblete Vidal, owner of the former 28 de Julio cinema, with the aim of talking about that place. In the interview they held, the engineer told him that said place was not for rent but that he was selling it for an amount of 120,000 US dollars. After that decision, González told him everything he felt like doing in favor of evangelization and the desire to work. helping youth and married couples, Poblete would be moved and would lend him the premises indefinitely.

On April 27, 1983, the first service would be given where there was a massive turnout, the pastors had words of greeting and gratitude to God for granting him the cinema-theater converted into a temple. The following year he took office with his family acquiring the recent temple July 28, in the La Victoria District.

In the year 1987, González would be interviewed at the International Congress of Panama pointing out his project to obtain the Holy Scriptures through the media, the following year his standard led him to rent a place for television space in several cities of the Peru until the early 1990s. In July 1995, his wife, Sr., died. Yolanda Porro, causing great sorrow in the church, still continued with her evangelistic work, in September of the same year she was appointed International Officer of the Worldwide Missionary Movement taking the position of treasurer. In November 1998 after a phone call from the pastor of the church of Arequipa, who had made contact with a person who had a license to operate a television channel in Lima that allowed him to open his open television network, Bethel Television, although that license was about to lose the authorization it granted the Ministry of Transportation and Communications, but later it was granted for this new channel, and it began broadcasting at the end of that year, through a space on the Global Television channel. In addition, it would install its radio network, Bethel Radio, which broadcasts by open signal through 174 radio stations nationwide. In addition, the television signal is broadcast via satellite to more than 60 countries by 43 television stations. This project had the support of the then president of Peru, Alan García Pérez, who at the beginning of 2008 inaugurated the transmission of the channel.

As such, the organization by supreme decree of 2004 was exempt from all kinds of taxes. By the mid-2000s, since its arrival, it had installed more than 2,200 churches (mostly in the popular sectors of the Andean region), partly formed by ex-criminal inmates who entered in search of rehabilitation. In 2016, González received recognition from the mayor of Chiclayo, David Cornejo Chinguel, who presented him with the city's shield for his social causes in the evangelistic campaign called "Jesus transforms families." which was held at the Elías Aguirre stadium, for the anniversary of the congregation.

When he took charge of the organization, he took an ultra-conservative position. This generated media controversy on several occasions, mainly due to his theocentric preaching and religious worship on his part, considering his words as the "most reliable to the gospel", and that his denial leads to expulsion. Despite not showing his official political support, he participated in the march With my children do not mess around in 2017, against gender ideology in the national curriculum, and the March for life against abortion. In 2017 he was targeted by the Prosecutor's Office after listening to an audio of Gonzáles related to a speech that encouraged "killing homosexuals".

=== Last years ===
In 2018 he left the position of treasurer and official World Missionary Movement at the National Convention in Colombia at the La Macarena Show Center, Medellín due to his age and personal decision.

On July 14, 2021, the Cuban leader decides to end his ministry in the July 28 temple, leaving it in the hands of the Peruvian pastor and theologian, Luis Meza Bocanegra in a thanksgiving service for his long career, in which he received tributes for the believers and would mention: “Beloved people of God, I appreciate your love and appreciation for the missionary work that the Lord has allowed me to carry out. All this time we have seen the fidelity of our Creator guarding and guiding this precious work. We are in victory and there is still work to be done. Forward church of the Lord!" After this ceremony, González would continue to participate in different outstanding events of the work together with pastors from various regional presbyteries.

== Personal life ==
On February 8, 1956, he married Yolanda Porro, whom he widowed. Not much time passed and he would join in marriage to the Puerto Rican pastor and missionary, Rita Vázquez on December 15, 1996.

In 2011 his longest-serving preacher and former son-in-law of González, Fernando Moreno, resigned from the Worldwide Missionary Movement due to financing problems that led to an organizational lawsuit, in response he would call his detractors the "sons of the devil".

== Books ==
- Enamoramiento, noviazgo y matrimonio (2004)
- Apocalipsis (2016)
