= Chota province =

Coordinates: 6°33′46″S 78°38′57″W

Chota
- Province
- Coat of arms

- Location of Chota in the Cajamarca Region
- Country: Peru
- Region: Cajamarca
- Capital: Chota

Government
  - Mayor: Werner Cabrera Campos

Area
  - Total: 3,795.1 km^{2} (1,465.3 sq mi)
- Elevation: 2,388 m (7,835 ft)

Population
  - Total: 142,984
  - Density: 37.676/km^{2} (97.580/sq mi)
- UBIGEO: 0604

Chota is a province of the Cajamarca Region in Peru. The capital of the province is the city of Chota.

== Political division ==
The province measures 3,795.1 square kilometres (1,465.3 sq mi) and is divided into nineteen districts:

District	Mayor	Capital	Ubigeo
Anguía	José Nenil Medina Guerrero	Anguía	060402
Chadín	Jose Cruz Rodriguez Rodriguez	Chadín	060403
Chalamarca	Alan Beymer Cubas Campos	Chalamarca	060419
Chiguirip	Joel Ysaias Quispe Nuñez	Chiguirip	060404
Chimbán	Raul Monsalve Rojas	Chimbán	060405
Choropampa	Artemio Uriarte Vasquez	Choropampa	060406
Chota	Werner Cabrera Campos	Chota	060401
Cochabamba	Julio Walter Villalobos Flores	Cochabamba	060407
Conchán	Fabriciano Delgado Tantalean	Conchan	060408
Huambos	Redublino Bustamante Coronel	Huambos	060409
Lajas	Idelso Chavez Fernandez	Lajas	060410
Llama	Fredesvindo Mejia Diaz	Llama	060411
Miracosta	Hugo Montalvo Fernández	Miracosta	060412
Paccha	Leoncio Ruiz Vera	Paccha	060413
Pión	Jorge Cieza Alarcon	Pión	060414
Querocoto	Jose Anibal Perez Valderrama	Querocoto	060415
Licupis	Marin Wilfredo Manay Saenz	San Juan De Licupis	060416
Tacabamba	Jeiner Ubaldo Julon Diaz	Tacabamba	060417
Tocmoche	Leli Barreto Quiroz	Tocmoche	060418

== See also ==
- Kuntur Qaqa
