= Anguía District =

Coordinates: 6.3417°S 78.6046°W

Anguía
- District
- Interactive map of Anguía
- Country: Peru
- Region: Cajamarca
- Province: Chota
- Founded: October 16, 1933
- Capital: Anguia

Area
  - Total: 123.01 km^{2} (47.49 sq mi)
- Elevation: 2,400 m (7,900 ft)

Population (2005 census)
  - Total: 4,542
  - Density: 36.92/km^{2} (95.63/sq mi)
- Time zone: UTC-5 (PET)
- UBIGEO: 060402

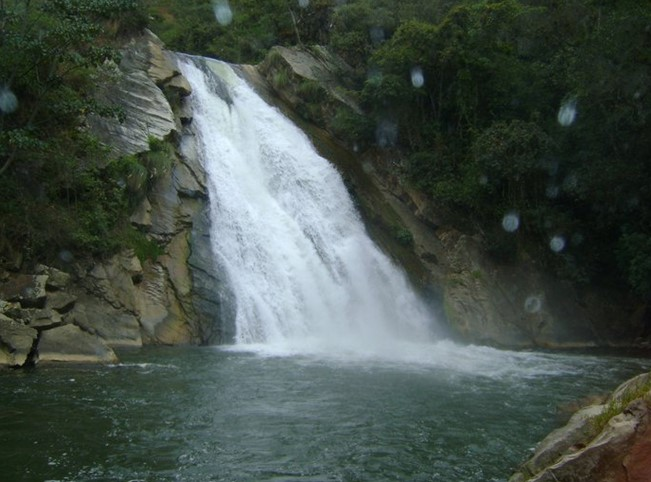

Anguía District is one of nineteen districts of the province Chota in Peru.
