= Chugur District =

Coordinates: 6.6706°S 78.7375°W

Chugur
- District
- Interactive map of Chugur
- Country: Peru
- Region: Cajamarca
- Province: Hualgayoc
- Founded: November 29, 1915
- Capital: Chugur

Government
  - Mayor: Vidal Garcia Efus

Area
  - Total: 99.6 km^{2} (38.5 sq mi)
- Elevation: 2,753 m (9,032 ft)

Population (2005 census)
  - Total: 3,760
  - Density: 37.8/km^{2} (97.8/sq mi)
- Time zone: UTC-5 (PET)
- UBIGEO: 060702

Chugur District is one of three districts of the province Hualgayoc in Peru.
