= Tacabamba District =

Coordinates: 6.3935°S 78.6113°W

Tacabamba
- District
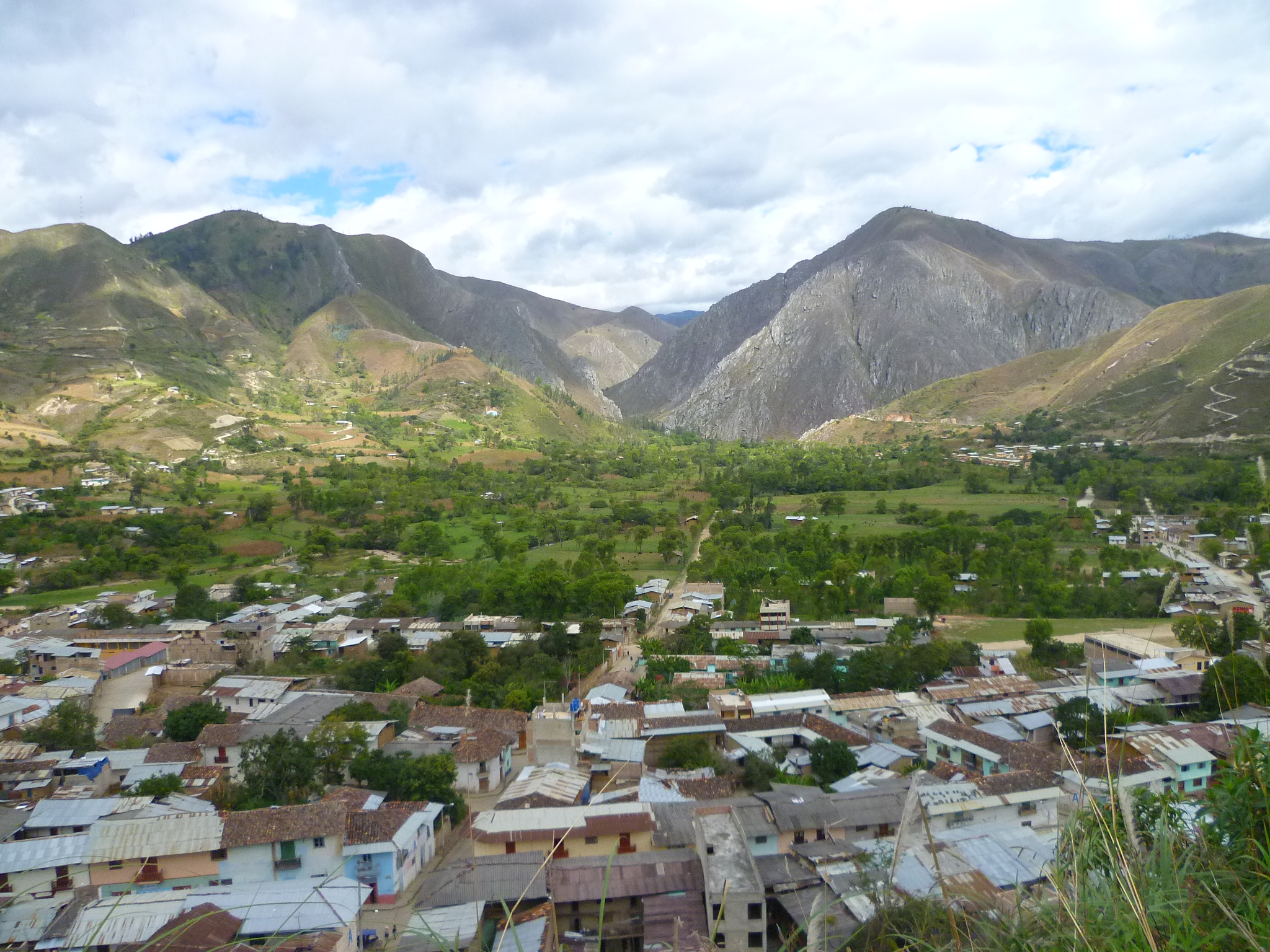
- Picture of Tacabamba, capital of Tacabamba District
- Interactive map of Tacabamba
- Country: Peru
- Region: Cajamarca
- Province: Chota
- Capital: Tacabamba

Government
  - Mayor: Walter Agip Rojas

Area
  - Total: 196.25 km^{2} (75.77 sq mi)
- Elevation: 2,035 m (6,677 ft)

Population (2017)
  - Total: 15,704
  - Density: 80.020/km^{2} (207.25/sq mi)
- Time zone: UTC-5 (PET)
- UBIGEO: 060417

Tacabamba District is one of nineteen districts of the Chota province in Peru.
