= Impeachment of Pedro Castillo =

2022 removal of the president of Peru

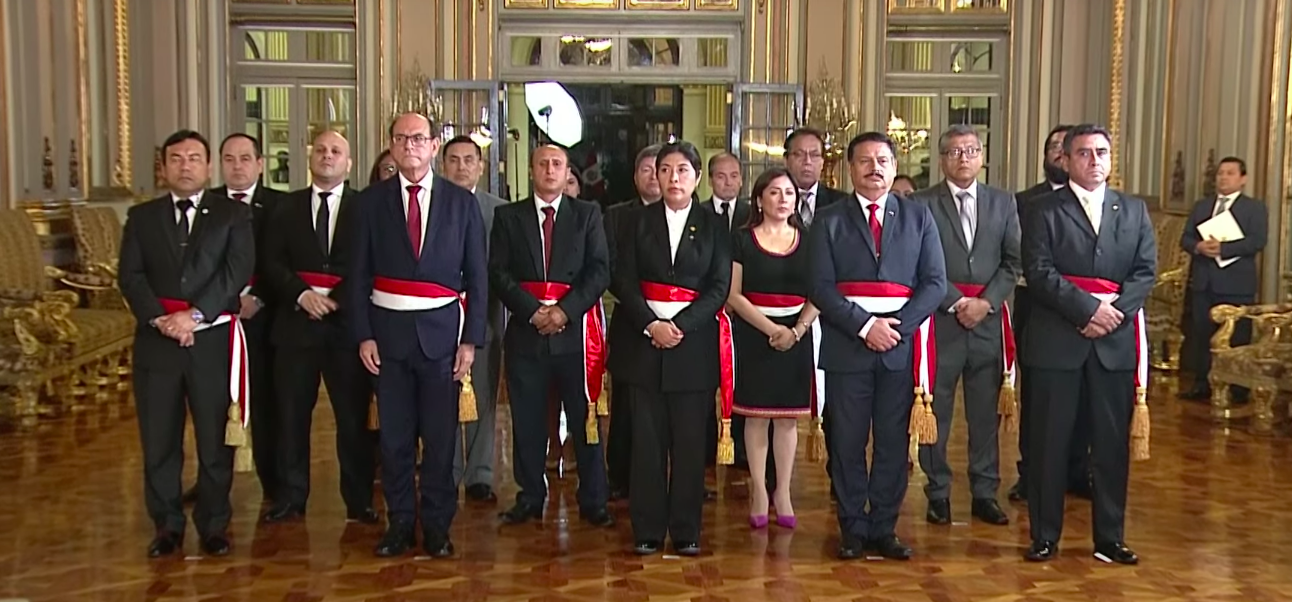
- Fifth cabinet of Pedro Castillo, chaired by Betssy Chávez
- Accused: Pedro Castillo, president of Peru
- Proponents: Congress of Peru
- Date: 29 November 2022 to 7 December 2022
- Outcome: Vacancy approval
- Charges: Adopted: "moral incapacity" under Article 113 § 2 of the Constitution of Peru

On 7 December 2022, the Congress of the Republic of Peru voted to remove Pedro Castillo as President of Peru for "permanent moral incapacity" under Article 113 of the Political Constitution of Peru. The vacancy motion was adopted hours after Castillo attempted a self-coup.

On November 8 and 17, according to the Government, Congress voted negatively on two motions of confidence presented that sought to modify the process of dissolving Parliament and calling a referendum without the need for an approving vote by Congress. However, both measures were dismissed by the executive board of Congress because "Law 31399" contemplates two exclusive rights of the Legislative Power, such as the ratification in the first vote of constitutional reforms and the provision that allows the President of the Republic to carry out a referendum to approve them, so the issues of trust directly interfered with the powers of the Congress of the Republic and collided with article 206 of the Political Constitution of Peru.

On 29 November 2022, the non-grouped congressman Edward Málaga presented the presidential vacancy motion for "moral ineptitude" with 67 signatures, which exceeded the necessary minimum number of 26 signatures. The debate for the admission of the vacancy motion was held on 1 December. When the date arrived, the motion was admitted to debate with 73 votes in favor, 32 against and six abstentions, with which the President of the Republic was summoned to the Plenary on 7 December 2022 to exercise his right to defense. The vacancy required a qualified majority (two thirds of the legal number of congressmen, which corresponds to 87 votes in favor of 130); however, various voices considered that the votes were not guaranteed to approve the vacancy, despite this, an unexpected event occurred hours before the session.

On the morning of the day on which the then president would exercise his right to defense, on 7 December 2022, he broadcast a message live to the nation in which he announced his intention to carry out a self-coup. Following this message, the Congress of the Republic brought the session forward and began the vote for the vacancy directly, under Article 46 ("nobody owes obedience to a usurping government"), due to the seriousness of the situation. One hundred and one votes were reached in favor of the removal, for which the vacancy motion was approved, ending the Castillo government.

== Constitutional framework ==
Due to broadly interpreted impeachment wording in the 1993 Constitution of Peru, the Congress can impeach the President of Peru without cause, effectively making the legislature more powerful than the executive branch.

The current Constitution of 1993 establishes in its article 113 that the Presidency of the Republic is vacant due to:

1. Death of the President of the Republic.
2. His permanent moral or physical incapacity, declared by Congress.
3. Acceptance of his resignation by Congress.
4. Leaving the national territory without permission from Congress or not returning to it within the established period.
5. Dismissal, after having been penalized for any of the offenses mentioned in article 117 of the Constitution.

In relation to the vacancy due to “permanent moral or physical incapacity”, until 2004 there was no procedure that clearly established the mode of application of the corresponding constitutional article, which is why Constitutional Court ruling No. 0006 -2003-AI/TC established as criteria that the removal of the president of the republic could only be approved with a qualified vote of at least two thirds of the legal number of congressmen, urging Congress to legislate on the matter in order to fill the up to then existing legal vacuum.

In this way, it was established that the qualified vote necessary to be able to vacate the position of president of the republic must reach a minimum of 87 votes, which corresponds to two thirds of the legal number of congressmen, considering that in the Peruvian congress the legal number of its members number 130.

Although the Constitution is clear in indicating the "permanent moral or physical incapacity" as grounds for presidential vacancy, on the other hand the Constitution itself also states in its article 117 that the President of the Republic can only be accused, during his term, for treason; for preventing presidential, parliamentary, regional or municipal elections; for dissolving Congress, except in the cases provided for in article 134 of the Constitution, and for preventing its meeting or operation, or those of the National Election Jury and other electoral system bodies. This article was invoked by President Kuczynski's lawyer during his defense argument before Congress when facing the first vacancy request in 2017.

== Background ==
=== Obstructionist Congress ===
The election will be flipped, dear friends.

— Keiko Fujimori

During the presidencies of Ollanta Humala, Pedro Pablo Kuczynski and Martín Vizcarra, the right-wing Congress led by Popular Force, the party of the daughter of the former Peruvian dictator Alberto Fujimori, Keiko Fujimori, opposed many of the actions performed by the presidents. The political legacy of the Fujimori family was assumed by Keiko after her father Alberto, who instituted Plan Verde and oversaw the Grupo Colina death squad during the internal conflict in Peru, was sentenced to prison for human rights abuses. Congress had already attempted to remove Pedro Pablo Kuczynski for "moral incapacity", though he resigned, and amid the COVID-19 pandemic in Peru, President Vizcarra was controversially removed from office, with thousands of citizens then gathered in protests against Vizcarra's impeachment.

Following reports of Castillo's apparent victory in the 2021 Peruvian general election, Fujimori and her supporters made unsubstantiated claims of electoral fraud, leading obstructionist efforts to overturn the election with support of wealthy citizens of Lima. Many business groups and politicians refused to recognize Castillo's ascent to the presidency, with those among the more affluent, including former military officers and wealthy families, demanded new elections, promoted calls for a military coup, and utilized rhetoric to support their allegations of fraud. The Guardian also reported that analysts and political observers criticized Fujimori's remarks, noting that it made her appear desperate after losing her third presidential run in a ten-year period.

The newly-elected congress dominated by the opposition right-wing parties, were opposed to Castillo, whom they attempted to impeach multiple times using political avenues. In November 2021, four months into Castillo's term, Fujimori announced that her party was pushing forward impeachment proceedings, arguing that Castillo was "morally unfit for office". The impeachment proceeding did not occur, as 76 voted against proceedings, 46 were in favor, and 4 abstained, with the requirement of 52 favoring proceedings not met. In February 2022, it was reported that Fujimorists and politicians close to Fujimori organized a meeting at the Casa Andina hotel in Lima with the assistance of the German liberal group Friedrich Naumann Foundation, with those present including President of Congress Maricarmen Alva, at which plans to remove Castillo from office were discussed. Alva had already shared her readiness to assume the presidency if Castillo were to be vacated from the position and a leaked Telegram group chat of the board of directors of Congress that she heads revealed plans coordinated to oust Castillo. A second impeachment attempt related to corruption allegations did make it to proceedings in March 2022. On 28 March 2022, Castillo appeared before Congress calling the allegations baseless and for legislators to "vote for democracy" and "against instability", with 55 voting for impeachment, 54 voting against, and 19 abstaining, thus failing to reach the 87 votes necessary.

=== Other proceedings ===
On 8 November 2022, Prime Minister Aníbal Torres asked Congress to vote on a matter of confidence to reform Law 31355, which would modify the parliamentary procedure to dissolve congress and call congressional elections. Congress shelved the Executive's request for reform, for which on November 11 Castillo warned: “We have declared before Parliament a prerogative of the Executive, as is the question of trust. Today we know the answer. I must announce that the Executive will also give an answer in the next few hours to the Peruvian people."

On 17 November, Torres once again asked Congress to vote on another question of confidence to repeal another law, 31399, which was approved in January 2022 and which modified the referendum. The Government opposed the rule, alleging that it prevented the participation of citizens directly. On November 24, the Board of Directors of Congress rejected the question of confidence. The president of the Congress, José Williams, explained that the President of the Republic cannot attribute an interpretation contrary to that indicated by the Constitution and the regulations of Parliament, doing so would lead to an unconstitutional dissolution of Congress. On the other hand, on 30 November the Constitutional Court declared unfounded the claim of unconstitutionality filed by the Executive Power against Law 31399.

Despite the Government's interpretations of having considered that two questions of trust were allegedly denied, Congressmen and specialists in constitutional law declared that the constitution would be infringed. Reforming a law is the exclusive competence of the Legislature and therefore, only Congress can interpret whether or not trust was denied.

== Initial justification of the vacancy motion ==
The initial reasons for which the vacancy process was initiated, as specified in the document presented were:

- The takeover and dismantling of the State apparatus through the appointment of senior officials with serious questions, favoring the interests of the President and his associates to the detriment of citizen well-being, arguing that people seriously questioned because of their background, criminal records and ongoing investigations were appointed. It is pointed out that it is especially worrying that once they assume their posts - like former ministers Juan Silva and Geiner Alvarado - they are directly involved together with the President and his family in tax investigations for corruption. In addition, it is pointed out that within the presidential environment there were figures such as Guido Bellido and Aníbal Torres who fomented hatred and resentment among Peruvians, exacerbating their ethnic, social, and economic differences, and using the state apparatus to incite the population of various regions of the country.
- The investigations for corruption in the closest environment of President Castillo, which powerfully suggest that the Head of State leads a criminal organization.
- The direct manifestations of the President's immorality, such as academic plagiarism and personal cover-up.

== Results ==
Almost all political parties were in favor of the vacancy, with the exception of Free Peru and those related to the spectrum of the left —Democratic Change-Together for Peru, Perú Bicentenario and Democratic Peru— who voted against (6 of them) or abstention (10 of them). In addition, congressmen Guillermo Bermejo, Kelly Portalatino and Betssy Chávez were absent from the session. Resolution 001-2022-2023-CR was published in El Peruano.

Pedro Castillo tried to seek political asylum at the Mexican embassy but was stopped by his own escort. The President of Mexico Andrés Manuel López Obrador criticized the arrest of until then President Castillo, stating "What interests them are their privileges, and above all the privilege of commanding, and more in this case since they consider him from the mountains, they add racism to it, then they don't want it".

== Public opinion ==
Days before the Castillo's self-coup attempt, a poll by the Institute of Peruvian Studies (IEP) showed that 55% of respondents disagreed with Congress' attempt to remove Castillo from office while 43% agreed. The majority of those supporting Castillo's removal resided in Lima while those disagreeing with his impeachment lived in rural areas. However, after the coup attempt a poll by Ipsos showed that 63% of respondents disagreed with the Castillo's decision while 33% agreed.

== See also ==
- 2022 Peruvian self-coup attempt
- December 2022 Peruvian protests
