= List of national power transfers in 2022 =

Changes in state leaders in the year 2022

The following is a list of power transfers between national heads of state, heads of government, prime ministers, and other equivalent positions in the year 2022. All countries which act as de facto sovereign states, per the criteria at List of sovereign states, are included.

== Heads of State ==
Head of State Changes in 2022
Date	Country	Position	Incumbent	Party	Incoming	Party	Cause	Source
1 Jan	Switzerland	President	Guy Parmelin	Swiss People's Party	Ignazio Cassis	FDP.The Liberals	Rotation	
24 Jan	Burkina Faso	President	Roch Marc Christian Kaboré	People's Movement for Progress	Paul-Henri Sandaogo Damiba	Patriotic Movement for Safeguard and Restoration (military junta)	Coup d'état	
27 Jan	Honduras	President	Juan Orlando Hernández	National Party	Xiomara Castro	Liberty and Refoundation	Election	
1 Feb	Armenia	President	Armen Sarkissian	Independent	Alan Simonyan (acting)	Civil Contract	Resignation	
11 Mar	Chile	President	Sebastián Piñera	Independent (elected for Let's Go Chile)	Gabriel Boric	Social Convergence	Election	
13 Mar	Armenia	President	Alan Simonyan (acting)	Civil Contract	Vahagn Khachaturyan	Independent	Indirect election	
19 Mar	Turkmenistan	President	Gurbanguly Berdimuhamedow	Independent	Serdar Berdimuhamedow	Democratic Party	Election	
1 Apr	San Marino	Captains Regent	Francesco Mussoni	Christian Democratic Party	Oscar Mina	Christian Democratic Party	Indirect election	
1 Apr	San Marino	Captains Regent	Giacomo Simoncini	Socialist Party	Paolo Rondelli	RETE Movement	Indirect election	
7 Apr	Yemen	President	Abdrabbuh Mansur Hadi	General People's Congress	Rashad al-Alimi	General People's Congress	Resignation	
8 May	Costa Rica	President	Carlos Alvarado Quesada	Citizens' Action Party	Rodrigo Chaves Robles	Social Democratic Progress Party	Election	
10 May	Hungary	President	János Áder	Civic Alliance	Katalin Novák	Civic Alliance	Indirect election	
10 May	Republic of Korea	President	Moon Jae-in	Democratic Party	Yoon Suk-yeol	People Power Party	Election	
14 May	United Arab Emirates	President	Khalifa bin Zayed Al Nahyan	N/A	Mohamed bin Zayed Al Nahyan	N/A	Death	
14 May	Somalia	President	Mohamed Abdullahi Mohamed	Quality Party	Hassan Sheikh Mohamud	Union for Peace and Development Party	Indirect election	
19 May	Timor-Leste	President	Francisco Guterres	Revolutionary Front for an Independent East Timor	José Ramos-Horta	National Congress for Timorese Reconstruction	Election	
24 May	South Ossetia	President	Anatoly Bibilov	United Ossetia	Alan Gagloyev	Meeting	Election	
30 Jun	Philippines	President	Rodrigo Duterte	PDP-Laban	Bongbong Marcos	Federalist Party	Election	
15 Jul	Sri Lanka	President	Gotabaya Rajapaksa	People's Front	Ranil Wickremesinghe	United National Party	Resignation	
23 Jul	Vanuatu	President	Tallis Obed Moses	Independent	Nikenike Vurobaravu	Our Land Party	Indirect election	
24 Jul	Albania	President	Ilir Meta	Socialist Movement for Integration	Bajram Begaj	Independent	Indirect election	
25 Jul	India	President	Ram Nath Kovind	Indian People's Party	Droupadi Murmu	Indian People's Party	Indirect election	
7 Aug	Colombia	President	Iván Duque Márquez	Democratic Center	Gustavo Petro Urrego	Humane Colombia	Election	
8 Sep	Antigua and Barbuda	Monarch	Elizabeth II	N/A	Charles III	N/A	Death	
8 Sep	Australia	Monarch	Elizabeth II	N/A	Charles III	N/A	Death	
8 Sep	Bahamas	Monarch	Elizabeth II	N/A	Charles III	N/A	Death	
8 Sep	Belize	Monarch	Elizabeth II	N/A	Charles III	N/A	Death	
8 Sep	Canada	Monarch	Elizabeth II	N/A	Charles III	N/A	Death	
8 Sep	Grenada	Monarch	Elizabeth II	N/A	Charles III	N/A	Death	
8 Sep	Jamaica	Monarch	Elizabeth II	N/A	Charles III	N/A	Death	
8 Sep	New Zealand	Monarch	Elizabeth II	N/A	Charles III	N/A	Death	
8 Sep	Papua New Guinea	Monarch	Elizabeth II	N/A	Charles III	N/A	Death	
8 Sep	Saint Kitts and Nevis	Monarch	Elizabeth II	N/A	Charles III	N/A	Death	
8 Sep	Saint Lucia	Monarch	Elizabeth II	N/A	Charles III	N/A	Death	
8 Sep	Saint Vincent and the Grenadines	Monarch	Elizabeth II	N/A	Charles III	N/A	Death	
8 Sep	Solomon Islands	Monarch	Elizabeth II	N/A	Charles III	N/A	Death	
8 Sep	Tuvalu	Monarch	Elizabeth II	N/A	Charles III	N/A	Death	
8 Sep	United Kingdom	Monarch	Elizabeth II	N/A	Charles III	N/A	Death	
13 Sep	Kenya	President	Uhuru Kenyatta	Jubilee Party	William Ruto	United Democratic Alliance	Election	
29 Sep	Nauru	President	Lionel Aingimea	Independent	Russ Kun	Independent	Indirect election	
30 Sep	Burkina Faso	President	Paul-Henri Sandaogo Damiba	Patriotic Movement for Safeguard and Restoration (military junta)	Ibrahim Traoré	Patriotic Movement for Safeguard and Restoration (military junta)	Coup d'état	
1 Oct	San Marino	Captains Regent	Oscar Mina	Christian Democratic Party	Maria Luisa Berti	We Sammarinese	Indirect election	
1 Oct	San Marino	Captains Regent	Paolo Rondelli	RETE Movement	Manuel Ciavatta	Christian Democratic Party	Indirect election	
17 Oct	Iraq	President	Barham Salih	Patriotic Union of Kurdistan	Abdul Latif Rashid	Patriotic Union of Kurdistan	Indirect election	
31 Oct	Lebanon	President	Michel Aoun	Free Patriotic Movement	Najib Mikati (acting)	Azm Movement	Term limit	
16 Nov	Bosnia and Herzegovina	President (Bosniak)	Šefik Džaferović	Party of Democratic Action	Denis Bećirović	Social Democratic Party	Election	
16 Nov	Bosnia and Herzegovina	President (Serb)	Milorad Dodik	Alliance of Independent Social Democrats	Željka Cvijanović	Alliance of Independent Social Democrats	Election	
7 Dec	Peru	President	Pedro Castillo	Independent (elected for Free Peru)	Dina Boluarte	Independent (elected for Free Peru)	Impeachment	
23 Dec	Slovenia	President	Borut Pahor	Social Democrats	Nataša Pirc Musar	Independent	Election	

== Heads of Government and Prime Ministers ==
Heads of government that are also heads of state are not included in this list.

Head of Government Changes in 2022
Date	Country	Position	Incumbent	Party	Incoming	Party	Cause	Source
5 Jan	Kazakhstan	Prime Minister	Asqar Mamin	Radiant Fatherland	Älihan Smaiylov	Radiant Fatherland	Resignation	
17 Jan	North Macedonia	Prime Minister	Zoran Zaev	Social Democratic Union	Dimitar Kovačevski	Social Democratic Union	Resignation	
19 Jan	Sudan	Prime Minister	Abdalla Hamdok	Independent	Osman Hussein (acting)	Independent	Resignation	
1 Feb	Peru	Prime Minister	Mirtha Vásquez	Broad Front	Héctor Valer	Democratic Peru	Resignation	
7 Feb	Central African Republic	Prime Minister	Henri-Marie Dondra	Independent	Félix Moloua	United Hearts Movement	Appointment	
8 Feb	Peru	Prime Minister	Héctor Valer	Democratic Peru	Aníbal Torres	Independent	Resignation	
3 Mar	Burkina Faso	Prime Minister	Lassina Zerbo	Independent	Albert Ouédraogo	Independent	Appointment	
3 Mar	Mozambique	Prime Minister	Carlos Agostinho do Rosário	Liberation Front	Adriano Maleiane	Liberation Front	Appointment	
11 Apr	Pakistan	Prime Minister	Imran Khan	Movement for Justice	Shehbaz Sharif	Muslim League (Nawaz)	Confidence failure	
28 Apr	Montenegro	Prime Minister	Zdravko Krivokapić	We Won't Give Up	Dritan Abazović	United Reform Action	Confidence failure	
12 May	Northern Cyprus	Prime Minister	Faiz Sucuoğlu	National Unity Party	Ünal Üstel	National Unity Party	Resignation	
12 May	Sri Lanka	Prime Minister	Mahinda Rajapaksa	People's Front	Ranil Wickremesinghe	United National Party	Resignation	
16 May	France	Prime Minister	Jean Castex	Renaissance	Élisabeth Borne	Territories of Progress	Appointment	
21 May	Republic of Korea	Prime Minister	Kim Boo-kyum	Democratic Party	Han Duck-soo	Independent	Appointment	
23 May	Australia	Prime Minister	Scott Morrison	Liberal Party	Anthony Albanese	Labor Party	Election	
26 May	Slovenia	Prime Minister	Janez Janša	Democratic Party	Robert Golob	Freedom Movement	Election	
30 May	Transnistria	Prime Minister	Aleksandr Martynov	Independent	Aleksandr Rozenberg	Independent	Resignation	
20 Jun	South Ossetia	Prime Minister	Gennady Bekoyev	Independent	Konstantin Dzhussoev	Independent	Appointment	
24 Jun	Grenada	Prime Minister	Keith Mitchell	New National Party	Dickon Mitchell	National Democratic Congress	Election	
26 Jun	Somalia	Prime Minister	Mohamed Hussein Roble	Independent	Hamza Abdi Barre	Union for Peace and Development Party	Appointment	
1 Jul	Hong Kong	Chief Executive	Carrie Lam	Independent	John Lee	Independent	Indirect election	
1 Jul	Israel	Prime Minister	Naftali Bennett	New Right	Yair Lapid	There Is A Future	Rotation	
16 Jul	Guinea	Prime Minister	Mohamed Béavogui	Independent	Bernard Goumou	Independent	Appointment	
19 Jul	Kuwait	Prime Minister	Sabah Al-Khalid Al-Sabah	Independent	Mohammed Sabah Al-Salem Al-Sabah (acting)	Independent	Resignation	
22 Jul	Sri Lanka	Prime Minister	Ranil Wickremesinghe	United National Party	Dinesh Gunawardena	People's United Front	Appointment	
24 Jul	Kuwait	Prime Minister	Mohammed Sabah Al-Salem Al-Sabah (acting)	Independent	Ahmad Nawaf Al-Ahmad Al-Sabah	Independent	Appointment	
2 Aug	Bulgaria	Prime Minister	Kiril Petkov	We Continue the Change	Galab Donev	Independent	Confidence failure	
6 Aug	Saint Kitts and Nevis	Prime Minister	Timothy Harris	People's Labour Party	Terrence Drew	Labour Party	Election	
21 Aug	Mali	Prime Minister	Choguel Kokalla Maïga	Independent	Adboulaye Maïga	Independent	Appointment	
6 Sep	United Kingdom	Prime Minister	Boris Johnson	Conservative Party	Liz Truss	Conservative Party	Resignation	
7 Sep	Burundi	Prime Minister	Alain-Guillaume Bunyoni	National Council for the Defense of Democracy	Gervais Ndirakobuca	National Council for the Defense of Democracy	Appointment	
17 Sep	Senegal	Prime Minister	Mahammed Dionne (previously, 2019)	Independent	Amadou Ba	Independent	Appointment	
27 Sep	Saudi Arabia	Prime Minister	Salman bin Abdulaziz	N/A	Mohammed bin Salman	N/A	Appointment	
12 Oct	Chad	Prime Minister	Albert Pahimi Padacké	National Rally for Democracy	Saleh Kebzabo	National Rally for Democracy	Appointment	
17 Oct	Sweden	Prime Minister	Magdalena Andersson	Social Democratic Party	Ulf Kristersson	Moderate Party	Election	
21 Oct	Burkina Faso	Prime Minister	Albert Ouédraogo	Independent	Apollinaire Joachim Kyélem de Tambèla	Independent	Appointment	
22 Oct	Italy	Prime Minister	Mario Draghi	Independent	Giorgia Meloni	Brothers of Italy	Election	
25 Oct	United Kingdom	Prime Minister	Liz Truss	Conservative Party	Rishi Sunak	Conservative Party	Resignation	
27 Oct	Iraq	Prime Minister	Mustafa Al-Kadhimi	Independent	Mohammed Shia' Al Sudani	Islamic Call Party	Election	
28 Nov	Lesotho	Prime Minister	Moeketsi Majoro	All-Basotho Convention	Sam Matekane	Revolution for Prosperity	Election	
4 Nov	Vanuatu	Prime Minister	Bob Loughman	Our Land Party	Ishmael Kalsakau	Union of Moderate Parties	Election	
11 Nov	São Tomé and Príncipe	Prime Minister	Jorge Bom Jesus	Movement for Liberation/Social Democratic Party	Patrice Trovoada	Independent Democratic Action	Election	
24 Nov	Malaysia	Prime Minister	Ismail Sabri Yaakob	United Malays National Organization	Anwar Ibrahim	People's Justice Party	Election	
26 Nov	Peru	Prime Minister	Aníbal Torres	Independent	Betssy Chavéz	Democratic Peru	Resignation	
11 Dec	Peru	Prime Minister	Betssy Chavéz	Democratic Peru	Pedro Angulo Arana	Independent	Resignation	
17 Dec	Ireland	Taoiseach	Micheál Martin	Fianna Fáil	Leo Varadkar	Fine Gael	Rotation	
21 Dec	Peru	Prime Minister	Pedro Angulo Arana	Independent	Alberto Otárola	Independent	Appointment	
24 Dec	Fiji	Prime Minister	Frank Bainimarama	FijiFirst	Sitiveni Rabuka	People's Alliance	Election	
25 Dec	Nepal	Prime Minister	Sher Bahadur Deuba	Nepali Congress	Pushpa Kamal Dahal	Communist Party (Maoist Centre)	Election	
29 Dec	Israel	Prime Minister	Yair Lapid	There Is A Future	Benjamin Netanyahu	Consolidation	Election	
30 Dec	Laos	Prime Minister	Phankham Viphavanh	People's Revolutionary Party	Sonexay Siphandone	People's Revolutionary Party	Resignation	

== See also ==
- List of state leaders in 2022
- List of elections in 2022
- 2022 national electoral calendar
