= 2022 in South America =

The following lists events that happened during 2022 in South America.

== Incumbents ==
=== Argentina ===
(Argentina)

- President: Alberto Fernández (2019–2023)
- Vice President: Cristina Fernández de Kirchner (2019–2023)

Argentina claims sovereignty over part of Antarctica, the Islas Malvinas, and South Georgia and the South Sandwich Islands.

=== Bolivia ===
(Bolivia)

- President: Luis Arce (2020–2025)
- Vice President: David Choquehuanca (2020–2025)

=== Brazil ===
(Brazil)

- President: Jair Bolsonaro (2019–2023)
- Vice President: Hamilton Mourão (2019–2023)

=== Chile ===
(Chile)

- President:
  - Sebastian Pinera (2018–2022)
  - Gabriel Boric (2022–present)
- President of the Senate:
  - Ximena Rincón (2021–2022)
  - Álvaro Elizalde (2022–present)
- President of the Chamber of Deputies:
  - Diego Paulsen (2020–2022)
  - Raúl Soto (2022–present)

Chile includes the Juan Fernández Islands and Easter Island in the Pacific Ocean. It also claims Chilean Antarctic Territory.

==== Easter Island ====
Alcalde: Pedro Edmunds Paoa

==== Juan Fernández Islands ====
Alcalde: Felipe Paredes Vergara

=== Colombia ===
(Colombia)

- President:
  - Ivan Duque (2018–2022)
  - Gustavo Petro (2022–present)
- Vice President:
  - Marta Lucía Ramírez (2018–2022)
  - Francia Márquez (2022–present)

=== Ecuador ===
(Ecuador)

- President: Guillermo Lasso (2021–2023)
- Vice President: Alfredo Borrero (2021–2023)

=== Guyana ===
(Guyana)

- President: Irfaan Ali (since 2020)
- Prime Minister: Mark Phillips (since 2020)

The Essequibo territory is administered by Guyana but claimed by Venezuela. Tigri Area is disputed with Suriname.

=== Paraguay ===
(Paraguay)

- President: Mario Abdo Benítez (2018–2023); Santiago Pena (2023–present)
- Vice President: Hugo Velázquez Moreno (2018–2023); Pedro Alliana (2023–present)

=== Peru ===
(Peru)

- President:
  - Pedro Castillo (2021–2022)
  - Dina Boluarte (2022–2025)
- Prime Minister:
  - Mirtha Vásquez (2021–2022)
  - Héctor Valer (2022)
  - Aníbal Torres (2022)
  - Betssy Chavez (2022)
  - Pedro Angulo Arana (2022)
  - Alberto Otárola (2022–2024)

=== Suriname ===
(Suriname)

- President: Chan Santokhi (2020–2025)
- Vice President: Ronnie Brunswijk (2020–2025)

Tigri Area is disputed with Guyana.

=== Uruguay ===
(Uruguay)

- President: Luis Lacalle Pou (2020–2025)
- Vice President: Beatriz Argimón (2020–2025)

=== Venezuela ===
(Venezuela)

- President: Nicolás Maduro (2013–present)
- Vice President: Delcy Rodríguez (2018–present)

Venezuela claims Guayana Esequiba as part of its territory.

=== British Overseas Territories ===
(United Kingdom)

- Monarch:
  - Elizabeth II (1952–2022)
  - Charles III (2022–present)

==== Falkland Islands ====
(Falkland Islands)

- Governor:
  - Nigel Phillips (2017–2022)
  - Alison Blake (2022–present)

The Falkland Islands are also claimed by Argentina, which calls them Islas Malvinas (Malvinas Islands).

==== South Georgia and the South Sandwich Islands ====
- Commissioner:
  - Nigel Phillips (2017–2022)
  - Alison Blake (2022–present)

=== French Guiana ===
(France)

- President: Emmanuel Macron (since 2017)
- Prime Minister:
  - Jean Castex (2020–2022)
  - Élisabeth Borne (2022–present)
- Prefect: Thierry Queffelec

== Events ==
- 13 March – 2022 Colombian parliamentary election
- 27 March – 2022 Uruguayan Law of Urgent Consideration referendum
- 29 May – 2022 Colombian presidential election
- 4 September – 2022 Chilean national plebiscite

=== Major holidays ===
==== January to April ====
- January 1 – New Year's Day
- February 15–16 — Carnival
- February 23 – Republic Day, Public holidays in Guyana.
- February 25 – Day of Liberation and Innovation, Suriname.
- March 24 – Day of Remembrance for Truth and Justice, Public holidays in Argentina.
- March 29 – Phagwah, Guyana and Suriname.
- April 19 – Landing of the 33 Patriots Day, Public holidays in Uruguay.
- April 21 – Tiradentes Day, Public holidays in Brazil.

==== May to August ====
- May 1 – Labour Day and International Workers' Day
- May 15 – Independence Day, Public holidays in Paraguay.
- May 24 – Battle of Pichincha Day, Public holidays in Ecuador.
- May 26 – Independence Day, Guyana.
- June 10 – Abolition Day, French Guiana.
- June 12 – Queen Elizabeth II's Birthday, Commonwealth of Nations.
- June 14 – Liberation Day (Falkland Islands).
- June 19 – José Gervasio Artigas Birthday, Public holidays in Uruguay.
- June 21 – Andean New Year, Public holidays in Bolivia, Chile, and Peru.
- June 24 – Battle of Carabobo Day and Feast of John the Baptist, Public holidays in Venezuela.
- June 29 – Feast of Saints Peter and Paul.
- July 1 – Ketikoti, Emancipation Day in Suriname.
- July 5 – Independence Day (Venezuela).
- July 9 – Independence Day, Argentina.
- July 14 – Fête nationale celebrated in French Guiana.
- July 20 – Colombian Declaration of Independence.
- July 24 – Simón Bolívar′s Birthday.
- July 28–29 — Fiestas Patrias (Peru).
- August 2 – Emancipation Day, Guyana.
- August 6 – Independence Day, Bolivia,
- August 7 – Battle of Boyacá Day, Public holidays in Colombia.
- August 9 – Independence Day, Ecuador.
- August 25 – Independence Day, Uruguay.
- August 30 – Feast of St. Rose of Lima, patroness of Peru.

==== September to December ====
- September 7 – Independence Day (Brazil).
- September 18–19 — Fiestas Patrias (Chile).
- September 29 – Battle of Boquerón Day, Paraguay.
- October 8 – Independence of Guayaquil, Ecuador.
- October 12 – Feast of Our Lady of Aparecida, patroness of Brazil.
- November 2 – Independence of Cuenca.Ecuador.
- November 15
  - Proclamation of the Republic (Brazil).
  - Independence of Cartagena, Colombia Day.
- November 25 – Independence Day, Suriname.
- December 25 – Christmas

== Sports ==
- January 30 – 2020 Copa Libertadores Final.

== Deaths ==
=== January and February ===
- January 21 – Leonor Oyarzún, 102, family therapist, first lady of Chile (1990–1994)

== See also ==
- 2020s
- 2020s in political history
- List of state leaders in South America in 2022
- Mercosur
- Organization of American States
- Organization of Ibero-American States
- Caribbean Community
- Union of South American Nations
