= 2022 national electoral calendar =

National and federal elections held in 2022

- Countries with national elections or referendums: Executive Legislative Executive and Legislative Referendum Executive and Referendum Legislative and Referendum Executive, Legislative and Referendum

This national electoral calendar for 2022 lists the national/federal elections held in 2022 in all sovereign states and their dependent territories. By-elections are excluded, though national referendums are included.

== January ==
- 16 January: Serbia, Constitutional Referendum
- 19 January: Barbados, House of Assembly
- 23 January: Northern Cyprus, Parliament
- 30 January: Portugal, Parliament

== February ==
- 6 February: Costa Rica, President (1st round) and Parliament
- 13 February: Switzerland, Referendums
- 27 February: Belarus, Constitutional Referendum

== March ==
- 9 March: South Korea, President
- 12 March:
  - Abkhazia, Parliament (1st round)
  - Turkmenistan, President
- 13 March: Colombia, House of Representatives and Senate
- 19 March: East Timor, President (1st round)
- 26 March:
  - Abkhazia, Parliament (2nd round)
  - Malta, Parliament
- 27 March: Uruguay, Referendum

== April ==
- 3 April:
  - Costa Rica, President (2nd round)
  - Hungary, Parliament and Referendum
  - Serbia, President and Parliament
- 9 April: The Gambia, Parliament
- 10 April:
  - France, President (1st round)
  - Mexico, Referendum
  - South Ossetia, President (1st round)
- 19 April: East Timor, President (2nd round)
- 24 April:
  - France, President (2nd round)
  - Slovenia, Parliament

== May ==
- 8 May: South Ossetia, President (2nd round)
- 9 May: Philippines, President, House of Representatives and Senate
- 15 May:
  - Lebanon, Parliament
  - Switzerland, Referendums
- 21 May: Australia, House of Representatives and Senate
- 29 May: Colombia, President (1st round)

== June ==
- 1 June: Denmark, Referendum
- 5 June: Kazakhstan, Constitutional Referendum
- 12 June:
  - France, National Assembly (1st round)
  - Italy, Referendums
- 19 June:
  - Colombia, President (2nd round)
  - France, National Assembly (2nd round)
- 22 June: Jersey, Parliament
- 23 June: Grenada, House of Representatives
- 26 June: Liechtenstein, Referendum

== July ==
- 4–22 July: Papua New Guinea, Parliament
- 10 July:
  - Republic of the Congo, Parliament (1st round)
  - Japan, House of Councillors
- 25 July: Tunisia, Constitutional Referendum
- 31 July:
  - Republic of the Congo, Parliament (2nd round)
  - Senegal, Parliament

== August ==
- 1 August: Cook Islands, Parliament and Referendum
- 5 August: Saint Kitts and Nevis, Parliament
- 9 August: Kenya, President, National Assembly and Senate
- 24 August: Angola, President and Parliament

== September ==
- 4 September: Chile, Constitutional Referendum
- 11 September: Sweden, Parliament
- 18 September: Liechtenstein, Referendum
- 23–24 September: Czech Republic, Senate
- 23–27 September:
  - Luhansk People's Republic and Donetsk People's Republic, Russian annexation referendums
  - Russian Armed Forces-occupied Kherson and Zaporizhzhia Oblasts, Russian annexation referendums
- 24 September: Nauru, Parliament
- 25 September:
  - Cuba, Referendum
  - Italy, Chamber of Deputies and Senate
  - São Tomé and Príncipe, Parliament
  - Switzerland, Referendums
- 29 September: Kuwait, Parliament

== October ==
- 1 October: Latvia, Parliament
- 2 October:
  - Bosnia and Herzegovina, Presidency and House of Representatives
  - Brazil, President (1st round), Chamber of Deputies and Senate
  - Bulgaria, Parliament
- 7 October: Lesotho, National Assembly
- 9 October: Austria, President
- 13 October: Vanuatu, Parliament
- 23 October: Slovenia, President (1st round)
- 30 October: Brazil, President (2nd round)

== November ==
- 1 November:
  - Denmark, Parliament
  - Israel, Parliament
- 8 November: United States, House of Representatives and Senate
- 9 November: Pitcairn Islands, Mayor
- 12 November: Bahrain, Parliament
- 13 November: Slovenia, President (2nd round)
- 19 November: Malaysia, House of Representatives
- 20 November:
  - Equatorial Guinea, President, Chamber of Deputies and Senate
  - Kazakhstan, President
  - Nepal, House of Representatives
- 26 November: Taiwan, Constitutional Referendum
- 27 November: Slovenia, Referendum

== December ==
- 6 December: Dominica, Parliament
- 8 December: Faroe Islands, Legislature
- 14 December: Fiji, Parliament
- 17 December: Tunisia, Parliament (first round)

== Indirect elections ==
The following indirect elections of heads of state and the upper houses of bicameral legislatures took place through votes in elected lower houses, unicameral legislatures, or electoral colleges:

- 1 November 2021 – 13 April 2022: Somalia, House of the People
- 24–29 January: Italy, President
- 26 January: Nepal, National Assembly
- 5 February: Algeria, Council of the Nation
- 13 February: Germany, President
- 3 March: Armenia, President
- 10 March: Hungary, President
- 24 March and 3 June: India, Council of States
- 8 May: Hong Kong, Chief Executive
- 15 May: Somalia, President
- 16 May – 4 June: Albania, President
- 18 July: India, President
- 20 July: Sri Lanka, President
- 21–23 July: Vanuatu, President
- 6 August: India, Vice President
- 23 August: Samoa, Head of State
- 28 September: Nauru, President
- Since 29 September: Lebanon, President
- 2 October: Bosnia and Herzegovina, House of Peoples
- 13 October: Iraq, President
- 7 December: Switzerland, Federal Council

== See also ==
- List of elections in 2022
- List of state leaders in 2022
- List of national power transfers in 2022
