= Silvana Robles =

Peruvian politician (born 1984)

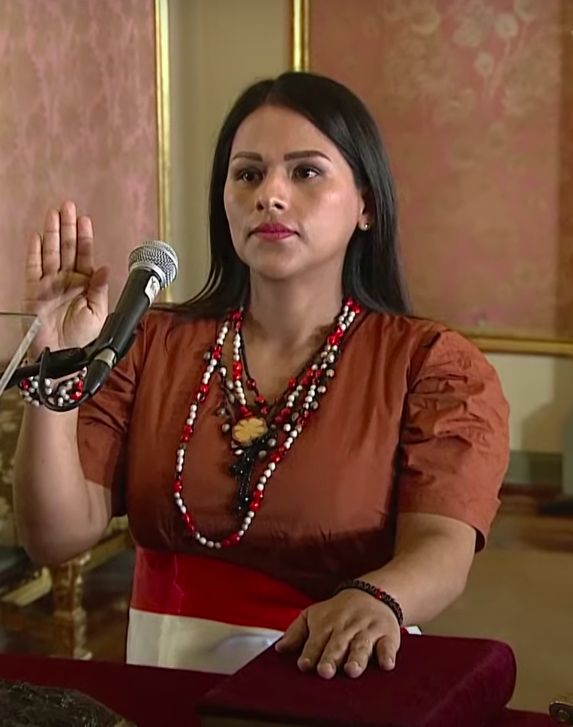
- Robles in 2022

Minister of Culture
- In office 25 November 2022 – 7 December 2022
- Prime Minister: Betssy Chávez
- Preceded by: Betssy Chávez
- Succeeded by: Jair Pérez Brañez

Senator of the Republic
- Incumbent
- Assumed office 27 July 2026
- Constituency: National

Member of Congress
- In office 27 July 2021 – 26 July 2026
- Constituency: Junín

Personal details
- Born: Silvana Emperatriz Robles Araujo; 6 November 1984 (age 41) La Merced, Peru
- Party: Together for Peru (2025–present)
- Other political affiliations: Free Peru (2020–2023); Independent (2023–2025)
- Education: Alas Peruanas University

Silvana Emperatriz Robles Araujo (La Merced, November 6, 1984) is a Peruvian nurse technician, dentist and politician. She has been a congresswoman since 2021. She was the last Minister of Culture in the government of Pedro Castillo, from November until the fall of Castillo during his attempted coup d'état in December 2022.

== Education ==
She was born in the Peruvian district of Chanchamayo and graduated in technical nursing from the La Merced Technological Institute. In 2017, she graduated as a dental surgeon from Alas Peruanas University.

== Political life ==
Congresswoman (2021–present)

She was elected as a congresswoman of the republic in the parliamentary elections of 2021 with 11 893 votes, representing Junín, for the Peru Libre party. She was sworn in on July 27 of the same year. She is spokesperson of the Perú Libre party.

Robles was not in favor of a refocusing of Pedro Castillo's government towards the moderate left, since during the appointment of Mirtha Vásquez in the second cabinet, she criticized the appointment of the latter, from the moderate left party Frente Amplio, and evoked a “political suicide” of Pedro Castillo during the cabinet postulation.

At the time of her appointment as minister, she was one of the last fifteen congressmen remaining within the parliamentary group of Perú Libre, since the various splits between Perú Democrático and the Bloque Magisterial de Concertación Nacional.

On December 11, 2022, she presented a motion of censure against the board of directors of Congress, presided by José Williams. This was due to the “undue approval of the vacancy” of former president Pedro Castillo, as well as other actions. The Plenary of Congress refused to admit the motion of censure for debate with sixty-eight votes against and forty-three in favor.

In the 2026 Peruvian general election, she ran for a seat in the Senate of Peru for the national constituency on the Together for Peru party list and was elected. After Miki Torres was elected President of the Congress of the Republic with 30 votes, defeating the left-wing candidate Daniel Barragán's 29, she was blamed for casting the vitiated ballot for Barragán, and she was subsequently suspended from the party caucus in the Senate and was investigated by her party. In defense, she claimed that Agripina Flores from Civic Party OBRAS also didn't show her vote.

Minister of Culture (2022)

On November 25, 2022, she was appointed by the then president, Pedro Castillo, as Minister of Culture in the ministerial cabinet led by Betssy Chávez. During her swearing-in, she spoke the phrase in the Asháninca language and then in Spanish “Ari namabendi kotakari noshaninkape. For the native peoples of our Peru, yes I swear”, reaffirming the indigenous diversity of Peru, which her ministry is concerned with.

On December 7 of the same year, following Pedro Castillo's attempted self-coup, she presented her irrevocable resignation from her post.
