= Verónica Ferrari =

Peruvian linguist (born 1979)

Verónica Ferrari Gálvez
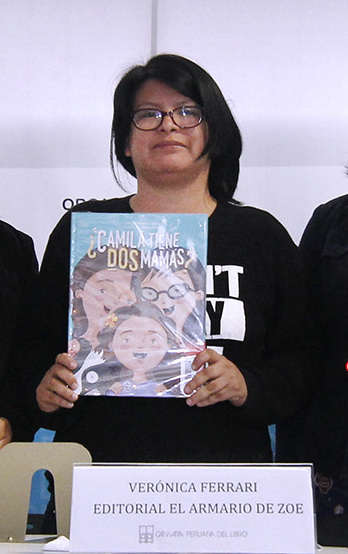
- Ferrari Gálvez in 2016
- Born: June 11, 1979 (age 47); Lurigancho-Chosica, Peru
- Occupations: Linguist, writer, documentary filmmaker, and activist
- Writing career
- Movements: Feminist activism, LGBT rights

Verónica Ferrari Gálvez (born in Lurigancho-Chosica, June 11, 1979) is a Peruvian linguist, writer, documentary filmmaker, and feminist activist for the rights of LGBT people. She was executive director and president of the Homosexual Movement of Lima (MHOL).

== Biography ==
Verónica Ferrari Gálvez was born on June 11, 1979, in Chosica. Daughter of Juana Gálvez and union leader Alberto Ferrari, she studied Law and Political Science, she later switched to Linguistics at the Universidad Nacional Mayor de San Marcos.

In 2007, she had her first approach to the LGBT group in the offices of the Homosexual Movement of Lima (MHOL) in the district of Jesús María. In 2009, she separated from her partner, with whom she has a daughter, and decided to dedicate herself to LGBT activism. Two years later, in 2011, she participated in the re-indemptive action «Besos contra la Homofobia» (Kisses against Homophobia) in the Plaza de Armas in Lima. That same year, she assumed the executive direction and presidency of MHOL, a position that she resigned from three years later, in 2014.

== Works ==
In 2012, she was part of Basta, 100 mujeres en contra de la violencia de género, Peruvian edition (2012), a publication led by Cucha del Águila and Christiane Félip Vidal. In this anthology 100 peruvian-women wrote about gender-violence in the form of short stories or poems.

In 2015, she published the work ¿Camila tiene dos mamás?, which is considered the first Peruvian children's story to talk about same-sex parents. It follows the story of a ten-year-old girl who moves to a new school where she has to respond to the curiosity of her classmates about her having two mothers. The work was illustrated by designer Mayra Ávila and is named after Ferrari's own daughter.

In 2018, she took part in the testimonial work "Proyecto Maternidades", which was presented at El Galpón Espacio, FAE Lima, and the 10º Encuentro de Teatro Popular Latinoamericano (Entepola).

In 2020, she collaborated with Ana Karina Barandiarán, to make the short documentary ¿Y dónde están las lesbianas?., which was shown at the Outfest Festival de Film LGTBIQ in Lima.

In 2022, together with the Silencio Collective, they made the short film "El polvo ya no nubla nuestros ojos", which won Best Film at the Punto de Vista Festival (Navarra, Spain), Best International Short Film at the L'Alternativa Festival (Barcelona, Spain), Special Jury Award at the Valdivia Festival, Best International Film at FENDA (Experimental Film Festival, Brazil) and Best Short Film in Cortópolis (Argentina).

In 2023, she was part of the team that published "Peruvian writers of the unusual. Anthology of stories: XX-XXI centuries", a selection of stories edited by the Círculo de Literatura Fantástica, a reading club of the House of Peruvian Literature.

In 2024, she published a compilation of stories about LGBTQI memory, together with Ronald Alvarez and Carlos Jaramillo, by the Gafas Moradas publishing house.

== Controversies ==
Ferrari is openly lesbian. In November 2017, she was accused of abuse through the social network Facebook by two of her ex-partners, who claimed that Ferrari had used psychological abuse against them. Ferrari denied the accusations. Due to the controversy, the political movement Nuevo Perú, of which Ferrari was part, announced that it would investigate Ferrari in this regard.

In 2019, Ferrari, along with a group of New Peru militants, resigned from the party because of the alliance they made with Perú Libre, Vladimir Cerrón's party.

== Initiatives ==
In 2020, together with the plastic artist Ana Karina Barandiarán, she created the Miguelina Acosta Library project, a safe space for children located on Contumaza street of the Cercado de Lima that meets educational needs in an environment with social problems.

On May 14, 2022, the library was attacked by the far-right collective La Resistencia during the celebration of the Feminist Divertiferia that coincided with a march against the government of Pedro Castillo that passed through the area.
