= Fernando Herrera Mamani =

Peruvian politician (1966–2021)

Member of Congress
- In office 27 July 2021 – 25 October 2021
- Succeeded by: Nieves Limachi
- Constituency: Tacna

Personal details
- Born: Fernando Mario Herrera Mamani; 31 July 1966 Ilo, Peru
- Died: 25 October 2021 (aged 55) Lima, Peru
- Party: Free Peru

Fernando Herrera Mamani (31 July 1966 – 25 October 2021) was a Peruvian politician who served as a member of Congress.

== Biography ==
He was born in Ilo on 31 July 1966. He entered the Instituto Superior Pedagógico Mercedes Cabello de Carbonera, where he trained as a language and literature teacher.

He worked as a teacher of Language and Literature in Tacna from 2011 to 2020, and as a teacher of Verbal Reasoning at the Institución Educativa Parroquial Corazón de María in 2020.

In the 2021 general elections, he was elected congressman of the republic for Free Peru, with 6105 votes, for the parliamentary period 2021 to 2026.

He was married to Martha Madueño, with whom he had three daughters.

He died on 25 October 2021, at his home in La Victoria of cardiorespiratory arrest at the age of 55 caused by COVID-19 during the COVID-19 pandemic in Peru, while a vote of confidence in the ministerial cabinet chaired by Mirtha Vásquez was being requested from the seat of the Congress of the Republic, a debate that was suspended. Due to his death, his position was filled by Nieves Limachi, who was his deputy.
