= Betssy Chávez =

Prime Minister of Peru in 2022

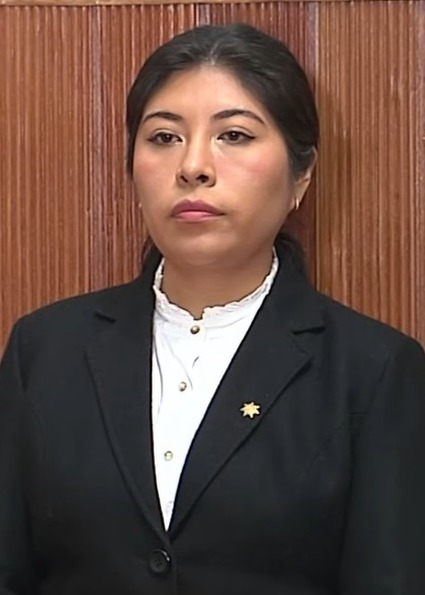
- Chávez in 2022

Member of Congress
- In office 27 July 2021 – 22 March 2023
- Constituency: Tacna

Prime Minister of Peru
- In office 25 November 2022 – 7 December 2022
- President: Pedro Castillo
- Preceded by: Aníbal Torres
- Succeeded by: Pedro Angulo

Minister of Culture
- In office 5 August 2022 – 25 November 2022
- President: Pedro Castillo
- Prime Minister: Aníbal Torres
- Preceded by: Alejandro Salas
- Succeeded by: Silvana Robles

Minister of Labour and Promotion of Employment
- In office 6 October 2021 – 29 May 2022
- President: Pedro Castillo
- Prime Minister: Mirtha Vásquez; Héctor Valer; Aníbal Torres
- Preceded by: Íber Maraví
- Succeeded by: Juan Lira Loayza

Personal details
- Born: Betssy Betzabet Chávez Chino; 3 June 1989 (age 37) Ciudad Nueva, Tacna, Peru
- Party: Independent (2014–2020, since 2022)
- Other political affiliations: Free Peru (2020–2022); Democratic Peru (2022)
- Education: Jorge Basadre Grohmann National University (LLB)

Betssy Betzabet Chávez Chino (born 3 June 1989) is a Peruvian attorney and politician, who served as prime minister of Peru from 26 November until 7 December 2022, when she resigned.

She previously was Minister of Labour and Employment Promotion, from October 2021 until May 2022, when a censure measure was approved against her. She later held the position of Minister of Culture, before being appointed prime minister. Chávez was a member of Congress from July 2021 and was suspended in March 2023.

== Early life and pre-political career ==
Chávez was born on 3 June 1989 in Ciudad Nueva District, Tacna, Peru.

=== Education ===
Chavez studied law at Jorge Basadre Grohmann National University, and was a student leader, holding positions in the student government. She graduated from law school in 2016, and holds a master's degree, with focus on Constitutional Law, from José Carlos Mariátegui University.

=== Career ===
Chávez worked as a lawyer in the Regional Government of Tacna (2020), a technician and assistant in the Congress of the Republic (2017–2020) and head of practices at the Jorge Basadre Grohmann University School of Law.

== Political career ==
Chávez said that her interest in politics arose from her father's work as a social leader for families that settled in the northern cone of Tacna.

In 2013, she was a candidate for the regional council of Tacna, for Alliance for Progress but she was not elected.

=== Congresswoman ===
She was elected congresswoman in the 2021 parliamentary elections with 8,472 votes; she represented Tacna, for the Free Peru party. She took her oath as congresswoman on 27 July that year. She is also part of the Democratic Peru parliamentary group.

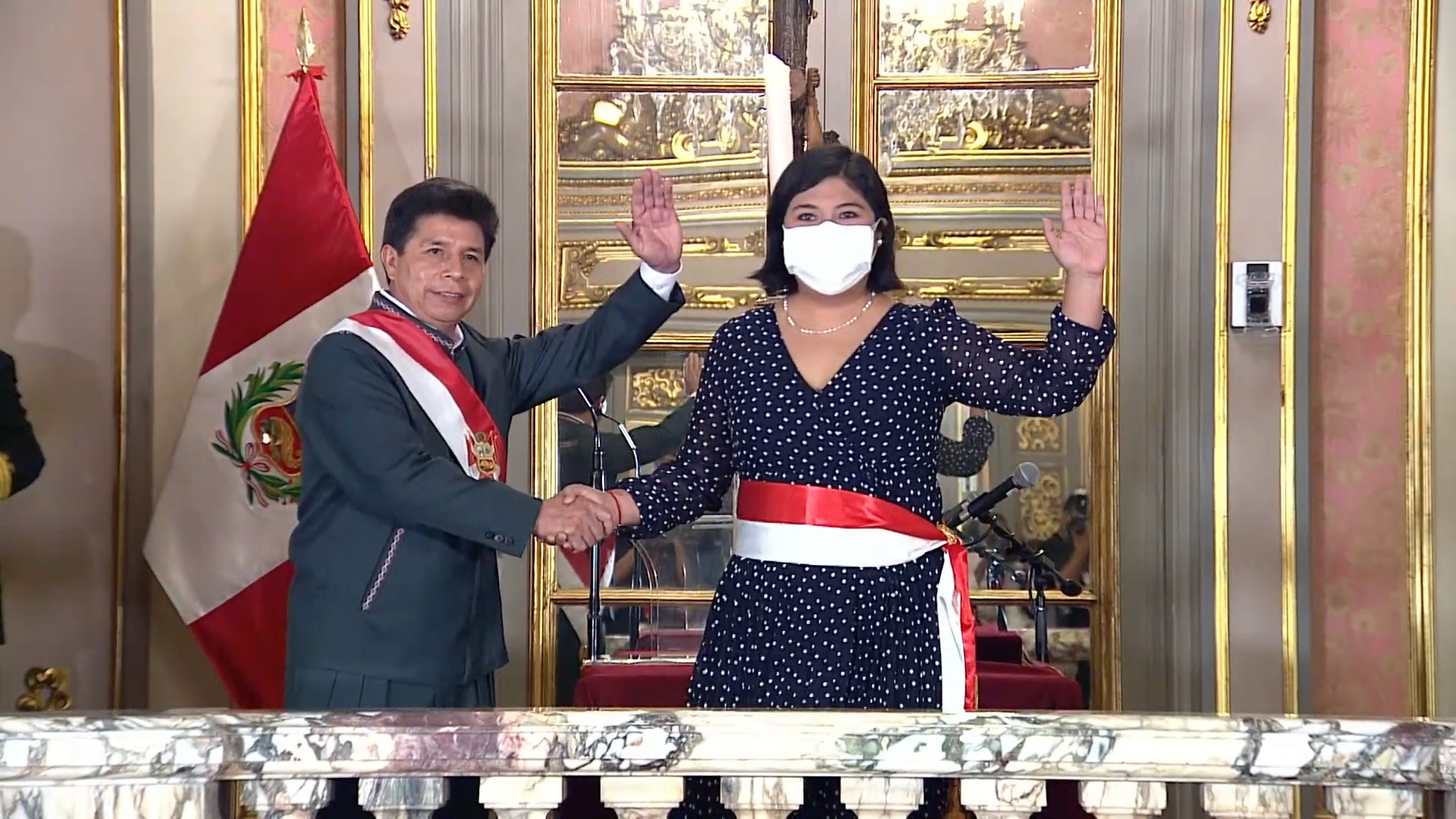
Castillo swearing in Chávez as minister

=== Ministries ===
==== Work and Employment Promotion ====
On 6 October 2021 she was appointed and sworn in by President Pedro Castillo, as Minister of Labour and Promotion of Employment of Peru.

In April 2022, various media outlets denounced that the minister had authorized a strike by air traffic controllers, which caused the cancellation of internal and international flights on the occasion of Holy Week. After that, she was questioned by the Congress of the Republic of Peru on 13 May. On the 19th of that month, in Congress, various congressmen presented a motion of censure against Minister Chávez. The following 26, Congress approved the censorship with 71 votes in favor due to her inability to manage and negligence in her performance.

==== Culture ====
On 5 August of the same year, she was appointed and inaugurated by President Castillo, as Minister of Culture of Peru. In statements to the press, the new minister mentioned that having been censured as Minister of Labour does not prevent her from assuming the portfolio of Culture. Minister Diana Miloslavich said at the time: "Her censorship does not mean that she does not do an excellent job", and Minister Alejandro Salas stated: "She is a great professional... and, if at any moment (the president) considers that she should be premier". She held that position until the following November 25, being replaced by Silvana Robles Araujo.

=== President of the Council of Ministers ===
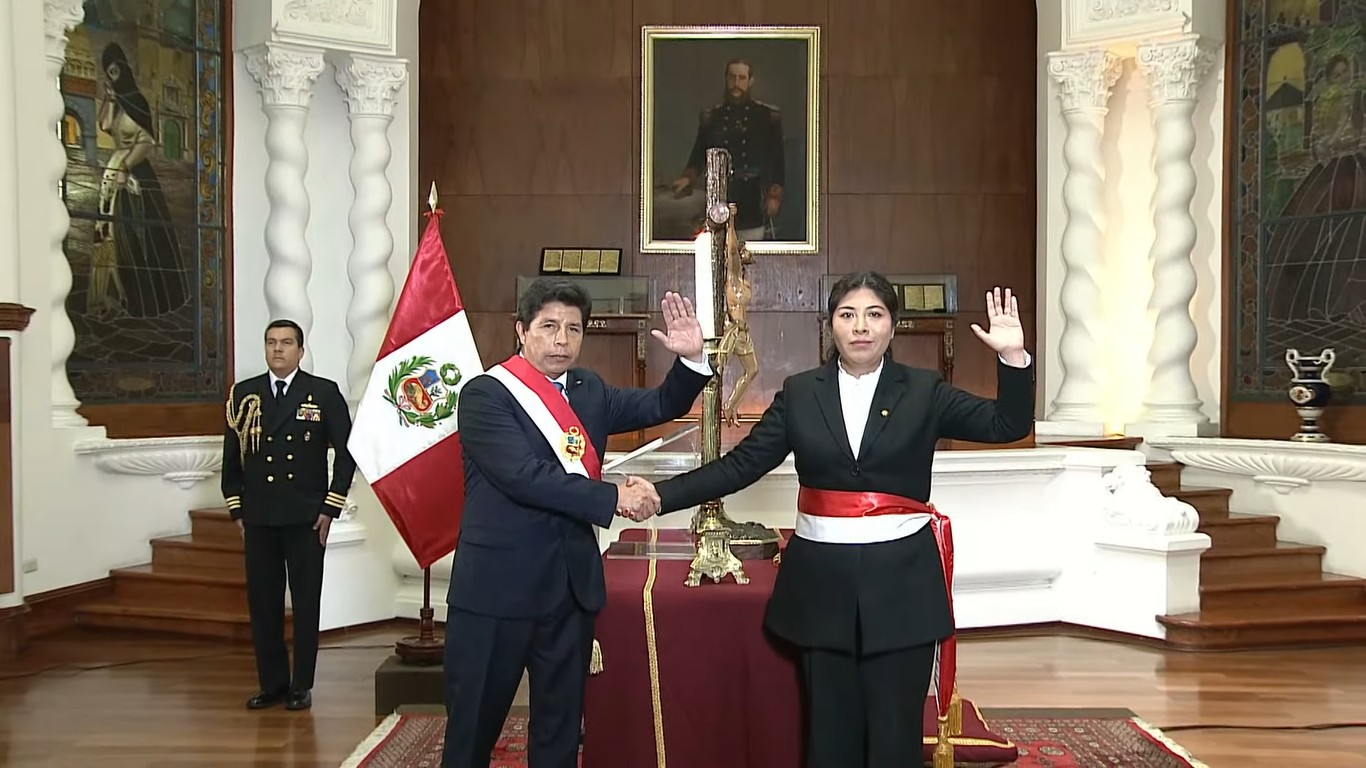
Castillo swearing in Chávez as Prime Minister

On 25 November 2022 she was appointed and sworn in by President Pedro Castillo as President of the Council of Ministers of Peru; after the acceptance of the resignation of Prime Minister Aníbal Torres. Chávez was the fifth Prime Minister to be appointed by President Pedro Castillo. Her appointment was seen by political observers as evidence of ongoing political instability. After two weeks in office, she announced her resignation.

Chávez, then Minister of Culture, through her TikTok account, described the Peruvian Attorney General Patricia Benavides as a "coup plotter" and referred to her as "Blanca Nélida Colán 2.0", a reference to a prosecutor aligned with Fujimorism who failed to prosecute Vladimiro Montesinos. This compounded problems after the initiation of a preliminary investigation against her, related to the favoring of her relatives in public office.

== Post-premiership ==
On 22 March 2023 Chávez was suspended by congress.

On 3 November 2025, Chávez sought asylum in the Mexican embassy amid an investigation against her on charges of rebellion relating to her role in President Castillo's self-coup. After her asylum request was granted, Peru severed diplomatic relations with Mexico. On 27 November, Chávez was sentenced to 11.5 years' imprisonment by the Supreme Court on charges of conspiracy to commit a rebellion over the self-coup.

Political offices
Preceded by Aníbal Torres	Prime Minister of Peru; 2022	Succeeded by Pedro Angulo Arana
