= Regional Government of Junín =

Regional government in Peru

- Gobierno Regional de Junín
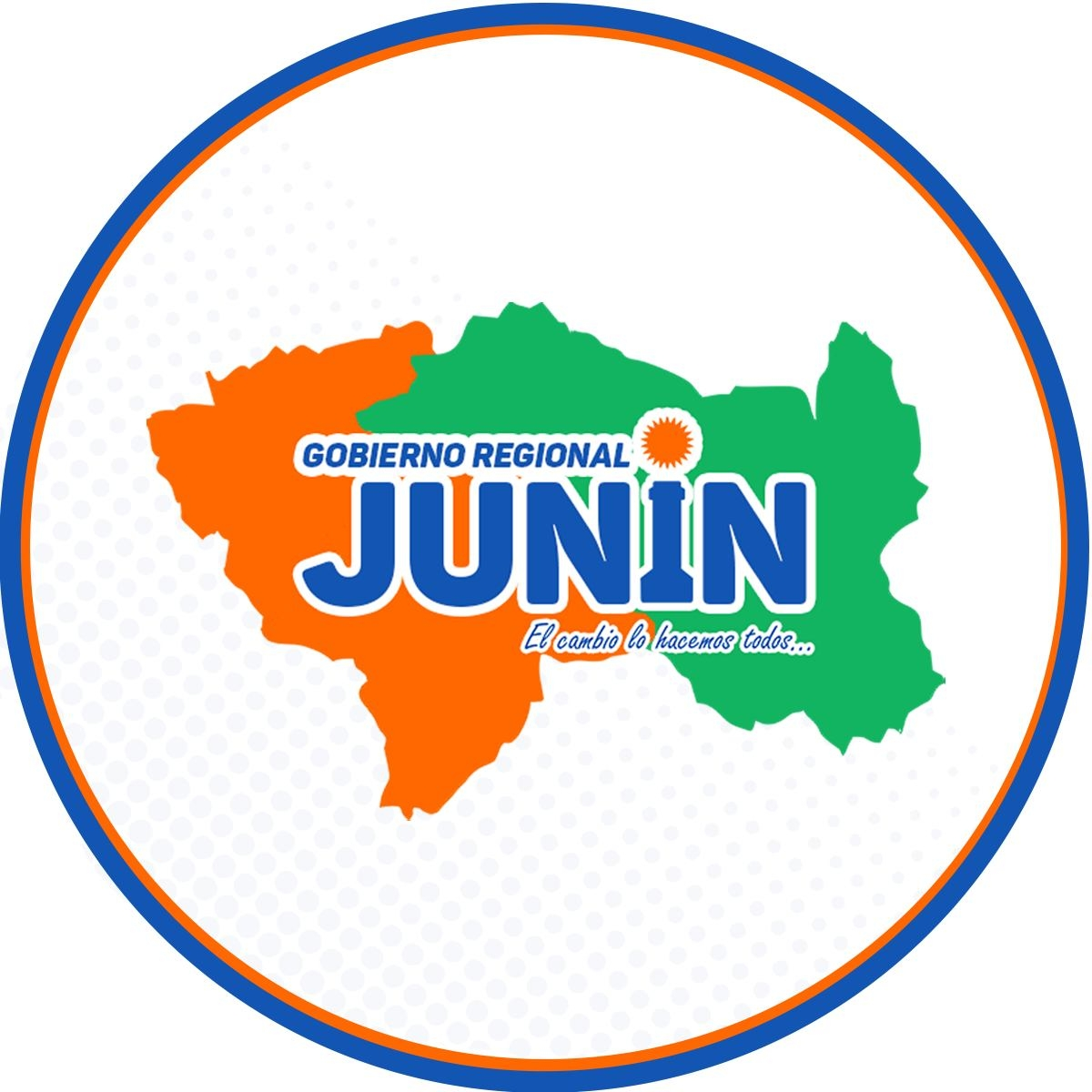

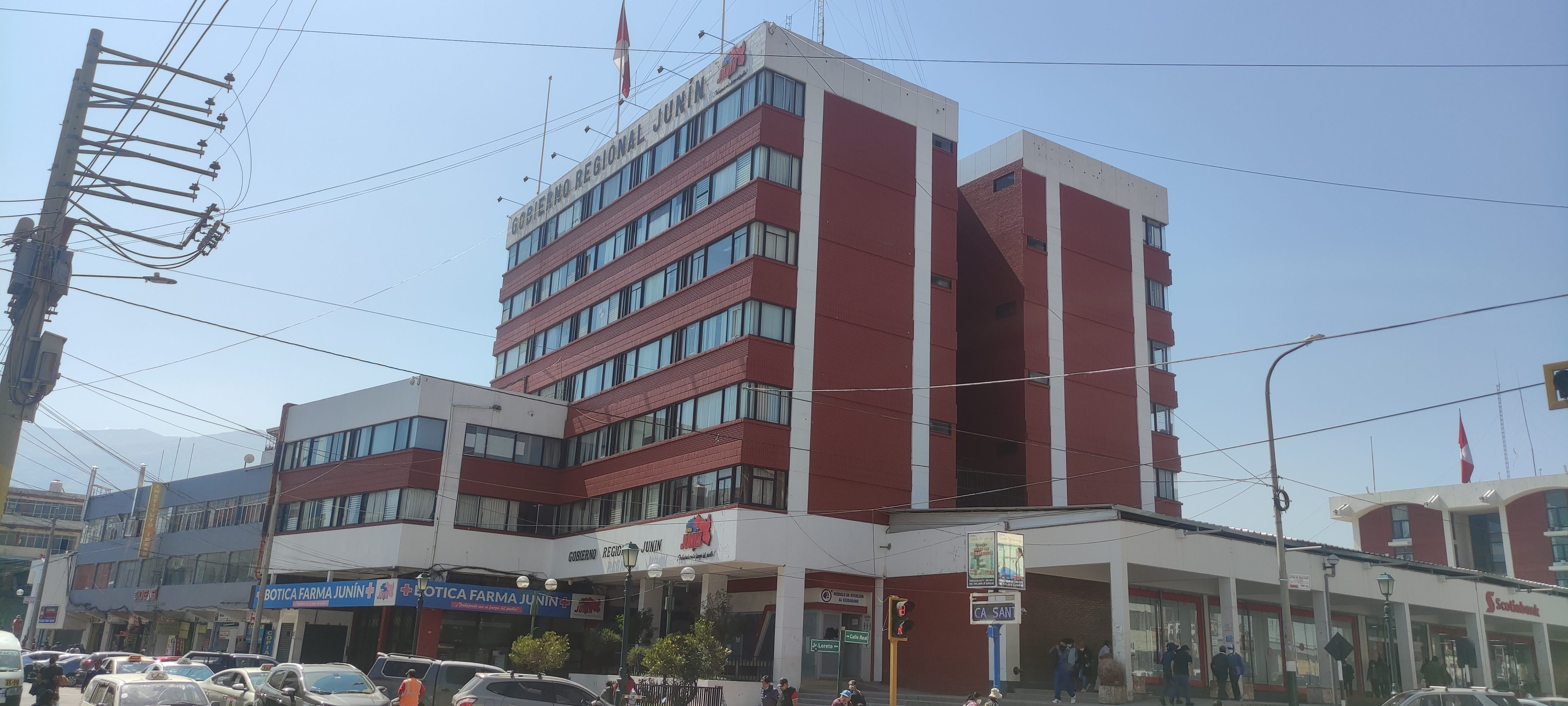

Regional Government overview
- Formed: January 1, 2003; 22 years ago
- Jurisdiction: Department of Junín
- Website: Government site

The Regional Government of Junín (Spanish: Gobierno Regional de Junín; GORE Junín) is the regional government that represents the Department of Junín. It is the body with legal identity in public law and its own assets, which is in charge of the administration of provinces of the department in Peru. Its purpose is the social, cultural and economic development of its constituency. It is based in the city of Huancayo.

== List of representatives ==
Governor	Political party	Period
Manuel Duarte Velarde	Unidos por Junín - Sierra y Selva	January 1, 2003–December 31, 2006
Vladimiro Huaroc	Convergencia Regional Descentralista (CONREDES)	January 1, 2007–October 11, 2010
Raúl Robles Echegaray		October 12, 2010–December 31, 2010
Vladimir Cerrón	Movimiento Político Regional Perú Libre	January 1, 2011–December 31, 2014
Ángel Unchupaico	Junín Sostenible con su Gente	January 1, 2015–December 31, 2018
Vladimir Cerrón	Movimiento Político Regional Perú Libre	January 1, 2019–August 20, 2019
Fernando Orihuela Rojas	Movimiento Político Regional Perú Libre	August 20, 2019–December 31, 2022
Zósimo Cárdenas Muje	Movimiento Regional Sierra y Selva Contigo Junín	January 1, 2023–Incumbent

== See also ==
- Regional Governments of Peru
- Department of Junín
