= We Are Peru – Purple Party =

Parliamentary group in Peru

We Are Peru – Purple Party Somos Perú – Partido Morado
- Abbreviation: SP-PM
- Spokesperson: José Jerí
- Vice Spokespersons: Wilmar Elera García; Flor Pablo Medina
- Founded: 23 July 2021
- Legalized: 25 July 2021
- Dissolved: 12 November 2021
- Headquarters: Lima
- Ideology: Christian democracy
- Political position: Centre to Centre-right
- Member parties: We Are Peru; Purple Party; Citizen Force
- Congress: 9 / 130

We Are Peru – Purple Party (Spanish: Somos Perú – Partido Morado, SP-PM) was a parliamentary group of the 2021–2026 Congress of the Republic of Peru formed by the representatives of the political parties We Are Peru and Purple Party. It was created on 23 July 2021 and legalized on July 25. The group was disbanded on 12 November 2021

== Composition ==
Post	Congressperson	Political party	District
Incumbent spokesperson	José Jerí	We Are Peru	Lima
Alternate spokespersons	Wilmar Elera García	We Are Peru	Piura
Alternate spokespersons	Flor Pablo Medina	Purple Party	Lima
Members	Alfredo Azurín Loayza	We Are Peru	Lima
Members	Edward Málaga Trillo	Purple Party	Lima
Members	Héctor Valer Pinto	Independent	Lima
Members	Hitler Saavedra Casternoque	We Are Peru	Loreto
Members	Susel Paredes Pique	Purple Party; Citizen Force	Lima
Members	Yorel Alcaraz Agüero	We Are Peru	Lima
