= Guillermo Bermejo =

Peruvian politician

Member of Congress
- Incumbent
- Assumed office 26 July 2021
- Constituency: Lima

Personal details
- Born: 6 October 1975 (age 50) Lima, Peru
- Party: Voces del Pueblo (2022–present); Free Peru (2020–2021); American Popular Revolutionary Alliance (2002)
- Other political affiliations: Democratic Peru (2022–2023); Todas las Voces (Perú) (2004)

Guillermo Bermejo Rojas (6 October 1975) is a Peruvian politician. He was elected for the Congress of Peru for the 2021–2026 period.

== Biography ==
He studied law at the Universidad Inca Garcilaso de la Vega. However, he did not finish his university studies.

He worked as administrative assistant at the Andean Parliament in Lima from 2010 to 2011.

== Political career ==
His political career began in the regional and municipal elections of 2002. Bermejo was a candidate for alderman of the Ate district for the American Popular Revolutionary Alliance. However, he was not elected.

In 2004, he founded the Marxist-Leninist left-wing movement Todas las Voces. Under the command and on behalf of the group, he made several international trips. Including Bolivia and Venezuela, for events with politically aligned circles.

In 2021 an audio was published in which he is heard saying "if we take power, we are not going to leave it". Bermejo admitted the authenticity of the audio, stating that it was made a year ago.

In the 2021 general elections, he was elected congressman of the republic for Peru Libre, with 8241 votes, being the most voted candidate of his party, in Lima, for the parliamentary period 2021-2026.

Despite pandemic restrictions established by the Ministry of the Interior, Bermejo attended on 31 October 2021 to a party hosted by Minister of the Interior Luis Barranzuela at his home located in the district of Surco, in Lima. Upon being caught by the cameras of Latina Televisión, he fled the place in the van of his lawyer Ronald Atencio, who reportedly was another of the guests. Bermejo claimed that "the loud music was from an adjoining house". However, neighbors of Barranzuela declared to the local press that a party did take place, that it had started in the afternoon and that due to the discomfort of the loud music they decided to call the police.

On 16 December 2021 Bermejo resigned from Peru Libre. He later formed a new group called Democratic Peru along with Héctor Valer to promote a new constitution.

== Investigation ==
In 2015, Bermejo was arrested by members of the Dircote of the National Police when he was walking along Petit Thouars Avenue, in the Cercado de Lima, for being processed for terrorism.

In May 2021, prosecutor Gino Quiroz asked to impose twenty years of imprisonment, a 100,000 soles fine of civil reparation to the State and disqualification to hold a public office. Bermejo was charged of membership and affiliation to the remnants of the terrorist organization Shining Path. According to protected witnesses, Bermejo traveled "consciously and voluntarily" to camps to meet with terrorist Victor Quispe Palomino, alias Comrade Jose, and his brother Jorge Quispe Palomino, alias Raul, who died of combat wounds in January 2021, between 2008 and March 2009. During a virtual hearing, a protected witness identified as 1FP-3022, who had belonged to the Shining Path between 1989 and 2000, identified Bermejo as a person who was taken to a meeting with the Quispe Palomino brothers.

== Personal life ==
On 22 December 2021, Bermejo announced on his social networks that he tested positive for COVID-19. He stated that he would remain in quarantine for fourteen days.
