= Nieves Limachi =

Peruvian architect and politician

Member of Congress
- Incumbent
- Assumed office 11 November 2021
- Preceded by: Fernando Herrera Mamani
- Constituency: Tacna

Personal details
- Born: Nieves Esmeralda Limachi Quispe; 17 February 1982 (age 44) Tacna, Peru
- Party: Free Peru
- Education: Private University of Tacna

Nieves Limachi (born 31 July 1982) is a Peruvian architect and politician. She serves as a member of Congress.

== Biography ==
She was born in Tacna on 17 February 1972. She studied architecture at the Private University of Tacna. She obtained a diploma in Project Management at the College of Engineers of Peru. She was a technician and assistant to the Congress of the Republic between 2016 and 2019 in the office of former congressman Jorge Castro Bravo, whom she denounced for forcing his workers to hand over part of their salaries.

In the 2021 general elections, she ran for the Free Peru party, but did not win the seat. Months later, after the death of Congressman Fernando Herrera Mamani and in her capacity as an accessory, she was sworn in on 11 November 2021.
