= Manuel Duarte Velarde =

Peruvian politician (1929–2023)

Governor of Junín
- In office 1 January 2003 – 31 December 2006
- Preceded by: position established
- Succeeded by: Vladimiro Huaroc

Member of the Congress of the Republic of Peru for Junín
- In office 28 July 1990 – 5 April 1992

Personal details
- Born: Manuel Edwin Duarte Velarde; 18 October 1929; Lima, Peru
- Died: 17 July 2023 (aged 93); Lima, Peru
- Political party: AP
- Education: National University of Tucumán
- Occupation: Agronomist

Manuel Edwin Duarte Velarde (18 October 1929 – 17 July 2023) was a Peruvian agronomist and politician. A member of the Popular Action, he served as Governor of Junín from 2003 to 2006 and was a member of the Congress of the Republic from 1990 to 1992.

Duarte died in Lima on 17 July 2023, at the age of 93.
