= Voices of the People =

Voices of the People Voces del Pueblo
- Abbreviation: VP
- President: Ronald Atencio
- Secretary-General: Jaime Laos
- Founder: Guillermo Bermejo
- Founded: 9 July 2022
- Registered: 26 October 2024
- Preceded by: Todas las Voces
- Ideology: Socialism; Mariáteguism; Anti-Fujimorism
- Political position: Left-wing
- Parliamentary affiliation: JP–VP
- Colours: Red
- Congress: 0 / 130
- Governorships: 0 / 25
- Regional Councillors: 0 / 342
- Province Mayorships: 0 / 196
- District Mayorships: 0 / 1,874

Website
- vocesdelpueblo.pe

Voices of the People (Spanish: Voces del Pueblo; VP), officially the Voices of the People Popular Political Party (Spanish: Partido Político Popular Voces del Pueblo) is a left-wing, socialist political party in Peru founded on 9 July 2022 by congressman Guillermo Bermejo. It was officially registered on 26 October 2024.

VP is part of the Together for Peru – Voices of the People (JP-VP) caucus in the Congress of the Republic, which has approximately 12 members, making it the fourth largest congressional force. VP has currently formed an electoral alliance with New Peru for Good Living, called Venceremos. VP member Ronald Atencio was the alliance's candidate for the 2026 presidential election.

== History ==
On 9 July 2022, left-wing congressman Guillermo Bermejo launched the organization Voices of the People (VP). The launch was covered by state and national media. Ronald Atencio was named president and Jaime Laos general secretary of the party.

The VP's registration process began on 9 June 2023, but was initially rejected by the Registry of Political Organizations (ROP) of the National Jury of Elections (JNE) for failing to meet requirements such as the minimum number of members and regional committees. The party appealed the decision, and the full JNE accepted the appeal, citing errors in the notification process, and ordered the process to continue. Finally, the JNE approved VP's official registration in the Registry of Political Organizations.

In March 2024, the JNE Plenary rejected an initial registration request due to observations in the voter lists and documents submitted. Subsequently, through Resolution No. 0153-2024-JNE, the body declared an appeal valid and ordered the procedure to continue.

On October 26, 2024, the JNE approved the registration of Voices of the People in the ROP.

In May 2025, Voces del Pueblo was part of the bloc that signed the political declaration "Unity to win, people to govern", along with New Peru, the Workers and Entrepreneurs Party and Primero la Gente, in support of a joint strategy for the 2026 general election. There was also the launch of alliances led by Nuevo Perú and Voces del Pueblo as central nuclei. Finally, it formed the ¡Venceremos! alliance together with New Perú.

== Leadership ==
According to press reports, the party president is lawyer Ronald Atencio and the general secretary is Jaime Laos.

== Ideology ==
Voices of the People presents itself as a socialist and popular group, committed to promoting a Constituent assembly, a Second Agrarian Reform, the industrialization of the country and structural reforms to the judicial system and the Public Ministry, with a plurinational vision and emphasis on the popular sectors.

== Controversies ==
In 2025, media outlets reported allegations of misuse of public resources and unauthorized affiliations linked to the party, issues that led to investigations and administrative proceedings.
