= Withholding tax (Switzerland) =

Tax deduction at source in Switzerland

Withholding tax (German: Verrechnungssteuer, Italian: imposta preventiva, French: impôt anticipé) is a tax levied at source in Switzerland since 1944 on capital income (particularly interest and dividends), lottery winnings and certain insurance benefits.

Withheld at a rate of 35% by the company (in particular the bank) providing the taxable benefit, and refundable to taxpayers domiciled in Switzerland who regularly declare their income and assets, it is intended to encourage fiscal probity.

== Description ==
The withholding tax was officially introduced on January 1, 1944, following a Federal Council decision of September 1, 1943, by virtue of the extraordinary powers it had obtained at the outbreak of World War II, with the aim of combating fraud and increasing tax revenues. Initially levied on movable capital and lottery winnings, it was extended the following year to life insurance, life annuities and pensions. It is levied on individuals and companies with domicile, headquarters, assets or economic activities in Switzerland. It has only had a constitutional basis since 1959.

The withholding tax primarily affects interest paid on debt securities issued by Swiss borrowers, interest on assets deposited in Swiss banks, dividends distributed by Swiss companies, and income from units in Swiss investment funds. It is also levied on cash winnings in excess of fifty francs from lotteries held in Switzerland, as well as on capital benefits, annuities, and life annuities under life insurance.

=== Refund ===
Withholding tax is refunded by the cantons (in the form of a deduction from taxes) to individuals with residence in Switzerland, providing they regularly declare the returns concerned and the capital that generated them. It is reimbursed by the Federal Tax Administration to legal entities domiciled in Switzerland, as long as they regularly declare the income concerned as yield.

Persons domiciled abroad may claim reimbursement of withholding tax if their country of residence has concluded a double taxation agreement with the country levying the tax.

=== Tax rates ===
The withholding rate has been 35% since 1976, except for life insurance benefits, which are taxed at 8%, and life annuities and pensions, which are taxed at 15%.

Initially set at 15% in 1944, the rate rose to 25% in 1945, then to 27% in 1958 and 30% in 1967.

=== Revenue ===
In 2003, tax revenues amounted to CHF 22.5 billion and refunds to CHF 20.9 billion. In 2021, this difference will amount to 4.9 billion francs, or 6.4% of total federal revenues.

The cantons have received 10% of net revenues since 2008 (6% since 1967 and 12% since 1971).

=== Reforms ===
In December 2021, the Federal Assembly passed a bill abolishing the withholding tax levied on Swiss corporate bonds, in order to make them more attractive. The request for a referendum was granted in May 2021, and the vote took place on September 25, 2022, when the people narrowly rejected the amendment to the law with 52% of "no" votes.

== Legal basis ==
- Federal Constitution of the Swiss Confederation archive of April 18, 1999 (as of February 13, 2022), SR 101, art. 132 archive para. 2.
- Federal Law on Withholding Tax archive of October 13, 1965 (as of January 1, 2022), RS 624.21.
- Withholding tax ordinance archive of December 19, 1966 (as of January 1, 2022), RS 624.211.
