= Democratic Peru =

Democratic Peru Perú Democrático
- Abbreviation: PD
- Parliamentary speakers: Nieves Limachi; Guillermo Bermejo (Deputy)
- Founded: 7 January 2022
- Dissolved: 22 March 2023
- Split from: Free Peru; Popular Action; We Are Peru
- Merged into: Democratic Change – Together for Peru
- Headquarters: Lima
- Ideology: Reformism
- Political position: Big tent Factions: Left-wing
- Colours: Red; Blue

Website
- Facebook page

Democratic Peru (Spanish: Perú Democrático; PD) is a parliamentary group of the Congress of the Republic of Peru. Formed in January 2022, it brings together several congressmen from three parties. Being the first "minority", the group joined the government from February 2022.

== History ==
On January 7, 2022, five former parliamentarians from Free Peru, We Are Peru and Popular Action asked the president of Congress, Maricarmen Alva, to create a parliamentary group. The first five members include Héctor Valer, Hamlet Echevarría, Carlos Zeballos, Luis Kamiche and Guillermo Bermejo.

On January 10, a few days after the creation of the parliamentary group, the then Minister of Labour, Betssy Chávez, announced that she would join the group.

On January 14, after a meeting with Pedro Castillo, President Héctor Valer declared his parliamentary group neither in opposition nor in favor of the government, but only in favor of a Constituent Assembly.

On February 1, 2022, Héctor Valer was appointed President of the Council of Ministers by President Pedro Castillo, replacing Mirtha Vásquez, who resigned the day before. Thus, the parliamentary group de facto integrated the composition and support of the government, with the President of the Council and the Minister of Labor as members of the government coalition.

== Position ==
The group can be referred to as left-wingers and catch-alls. Since there are differences since its creation, Héctor Valer during a meeting with Pedro Castillo called the group neither in the opposition nor in favor of the government. However, a few days later, Guillermo Bermejo, who resigned from Free Peru, evokes a parliamentary group in support of the government.

However, the group is characterized by ideological elements shared by all, whether by those who remain in Free Peru, or by those who have left the party, and the dissidents of the We Are Peru and Popular Action parties. The parliamentarians particularly want the convocation of a Constituent Assembly, the fight against corruption and the restoration of the image of legislators.

== Members ==
Initially made up of 5 members, being the minimum number of congressmen required to create a parliamentary group, the then Minister of Labor of the government of Pedro Castillo, Betssy Chávez, also a congressman, decided to join the group. Two days later, the parliamentarian Nieves Limachi decided to join the group, which was made up mostly of current or former members of Free Peru. In 2022, Héctor Valer quit the caucus, followed by Carlos Zeballos.

=== Composition ===
| Congresspeople | Political party | District |
|---|---|---|
| Guillermo Bermejo | Free Peru | Lima |
| Hamlet Echevarría | Independent | Cajamarca |
| Nieves Limachi | Independent | Tacna |
| Luis Roberto Kamiche | Independent | La Libertad |
