= 2022 Liechtenstein referendums =

Two referendums were held in Liechtenstein during 2022. The first was held on 26 June 2022, in which voters decided on an exemption for pensioners from paying the annual deductible of the national health insurance. The second was held on 18 September on COVID-19 legislation.

== June referendum ==
Exemption of pensioners from the annual health insurance deductible
- 26 June 2022

Results
Choice	Votes	%
Yes	7,811	63.90%
No	4,413	36.10%
Valid votes	12,224	99.56%
Invalid or blank votes	54	0.44%
Total votes	12,278	100.00%
Registered voters/turnout	20,580	59.66%
- Yes 60–70% 50–60%

In 2021 elections to Landtag, the Democrats for Liechtenstein (DpL) won two of the 25 seats and became part of the opposition.

The health insurance system in Liechtenstein has an annual medical deductible of 500 Swiss Francs payable by the insured person. During 2021, the DpL submitted a bill to the Landtag aimed at exempting people who have reached the retirement age of 65, which would result in annual cost for the government of approximately 3.5 million Swiss Francs. On 29 September 2021, the proposal was rejected by 10 votes for and 15 against.

In response, in January 2022 the DpL announced its intention to organize a collection of signatures for a popular initiative. The project was submitted to the authorities and validated on 10 March 2022, paving the way for the collection period which ran from 18 March to the 29 April, with 2,846 validated signatures.

Having collected the signatures of more than 1,000 registered voters in less than six weeks, the initiative was presented to the Landtag within the framework of article 64-2 of the constitution. The parliament rejected it on 4 May 2022 by 9 votes for and 16 against, resulting in it going to a popular vote.

=== Results ===
Choice	Votes	%
For	7,811	63.90
Against	4,413	36.10
Total	12,224	100.00
Valid votes	12,224	99.56
Invalid votes	45	0.37
Blank votes	9	0.07
Total votes	12,278	100.00
Registered voters/turnout	20,580	59.66
Source: Government of Liechtenstein

==== By municipality ====
Municipality	For	Against	Turnout %
Vaduz	992	592	58.3
Balzers	958	616	61.8
Planken	123	72	73.7
Schaan	1,165	636	59.6
Triesen	1,036	496	57.9
Triesenberg	719	362	65.5
Oberland	4,993	2,774	60.5
Eschen	928	465	60.6
Gamprin	331	193	58.4
Mauren	808	422	58.6
Ruggell	507	367	66.2
Schellenberg	248	188	70.7
Unterland	2,822	1,635	61.6

== September referendum ==
COVID-19 legislation
- 18 September 2022

Results
Choice	Votes	%
Yes	6,366	47.27%
No	7,101	52.73%
Valid votes	13,467	99.30%
Invalid or blank votes	95	0.70%
Total votes	13,562	100.00%
Registered voters/turnout	20,660	65.64%
Yes
50–60%
No
50–60%

In order to fight against the COVID-19 pandemic, on 9 September 2021, the government introduced the so-called 3G rule (for Getestete, Geimpfte, Genesene, i.e. in English Tested, Vaccinated, Recovered), with the aim of stemming the increase in cases of contamination and thus relieving the pressure on health personnel. The 3G rule prohibited access to public places and events to individuals who cannot prove a negative COVID-19 test or a certificate of vaccination or a document certifying that they have been infected with the disease but are now cured.

The 3G rule was quickly changed into the 2G rule, the government removing by another order the possibility of accessing these places on presentation of a negative test. At the same time, new restrictions were added concerning events organized outdoors. These new measures applied from 15 December 2021 to 18 February 2022.

Meanwhile, on 14 January 2022, more than 400 citizens filed a complaint with the State Court against these measures, which they considered liberticidal. Among the plaintiffs, there were several anti-vaccination groups, most notably the recently formed People at the Center party. On 10 May, the Court declared the legal basis for these measures insufficient. The court expressed an understanding of the difficult decisions taken by the government in the context of the fight against the pandemic, but nevertheless found the order establishing the 2G rule incompatible with the law and the constitution.

This decision forced the Landtag to amend the Health Act in June. The debates proved to be heated, with one parliamentarian going so far as to qualify the restrictions as a "surveillance system comparable to that of China", with part of parliament deeming the 3G rule sufficient. The Minister of Society and Culture, Manuel Frick, justified these measures by the need for the government to align itself if necessary with the measures taken by the neighbouring Switzerland, with which Liechtenstein is linked by a customs union and on which it depends entirely on matters of intensive care.

The amendment was voted on 29 June with 18 votes for and 7 against. The proposal of the Democrats for Liechtenstein (DpL) to submit the law to a referendum was rejected the same day, the Landtag voting with 9 votes for and 16 against. However, Mensch im Mittelpunkt (MiM), a small party created six months earlier, started collecting signatures in order to force a referendum on the new Health Law. From 1 to 29 July, 3,570 signatures were collected and recognized as valid. On 1 August, the government set the referendum for 18 September.

=== Results ===
Choice	Votes	%
For	6,366	47.27
Against	7,101	52.73
Total	13,467	100.00
Valid votes	13,467	99.30
Invalid votes	83	0.61
Blank votes	12	0.09
Total votes	13,562	100.00
Registered voters/turnout	20,660	65.64
Source: Government of Liechtenstein
