= Jorge Basadre Grohmann National University =

Coordinates: 18.0062°S 70.2389°W

- Universidad Nacional Jorge Basadre Grohmann
- Type: National University, List of universities in Peru
- Established: 1971
- Rector: Blgo. Guillermo Bornaz Acosta
- Academic staff: 15 (30 Academic Professional School)
- Location: Miraflores Avenue, Tacna / Tacna - Perú, Tacna, Peru
- Website: www.unjbg.edu.pe

The Jorge Basadre Grohmann National University (Spanish: Universidad Nacional Jorge Basadre Grohmann) is a public university located in the city of Tacna, Peru. It was founded by Decree Law No. 1894 on August 26, 1971; academic activities started on May 13, 1972. The university is named after Jorge Basadre, a renowned Peruvian historian born in Tacna. Currently, the university is known by the acronym UNJBG and prepares students for 30 careers.

== Faculties ==
- Mining Engineering
- Accounting Sciences
- Metallurgical Engineering
- Administrative Sciences
- Fishing Engineering
- Agricultural Sciences
- Food Industries
- Obstetrics
- Education Sciences
- Sciences (Academic professional schools of: Biology-Microbiology, Computers and Systems, Applied Physics and Chemical Engineering)
- Nursing
- Medical Sciences
- Literature and Judicial Sciences
- Architecture and Urbanism
- Engineering
- School of postgraduate studies

== Administrators ==
Charge	Professor
Rector:	Blgo. Guillermo Bornaz Acosta
Academic Vice Rector (c):	Mgr. Juan Yábar Jibaja
Administrative Vice Rector (c):	Mgr. Alberto Pacheco Pacheco
Secretary General:	Mgr. Luis Espinoza Ramos
