= 2022 Slovenian referendum =

A three-part referendum was held in Slovenia on 27 November 2022. Voters were asked whether they approve of proposals to repeal three laws; one on the cabinet of government ministers, one delaying a bill regarding long-term care for pensioners, and one on reorganising the governing bodies of state-owned broadcaster RTV Slovenija. Voters voted in favour of retaining all three laws.

== Background ==
The repeal of the three laws was proposed by the Slovenian Democratic Party (SDS), which collected the required 40,000 signatures for each proposal; 52,669 for the RTV proposal, 52,280 for the cabinet proposal and 52,182 for the long-term care act proposal (a modification of the act that had been passed by the SDS government that lost power in the April 2022 elections, further increasing funds and salaries but delaying the increase by one year).

The incumbent government had passed the RTV governance legislation following claimed interference in the broadcaster by the previous SDS government. The legislation replaced the director general with a management board, and merged the programming council and supervisory board into a single council, none of whose members would be politically appointed.

The SDS had wanted the referendum held alongside the second round of local elections on 4 December, but the date was set as 27 November.

== Electoral system ==
In order for the proposed repeals to succeed, a majority must vote in favour of the repeal, and the number voting to repeal must be at least 20% of the number of registered voters.

== Campaign ==
On 22 November 2022, RTV Slovenija broadcast a debate concerning the referendum on its reorganisation with spokespeople for all 27 official campaigns being present.

== Results ==
Question	Retain law		Repeal law		Invalid/ blank	Total votes	Registered voters	Turnout	Outcome
Question	Votes	%	Votes	%	Invalid/ blank	Total votes	Registered voters	Turnout	Outcome
Cabinet of government ministers	399,588	56.69	305,317	43.31	3,710	708,615	1,694,348	41.83	Law retained
Long-term care for pensioners	439,376	62.27	266,206	37.73	3,209	708,791	1,694,348	41.84	Law retained
Governing bodies of RTV Slovenija	443,971	62.83	262,648	37.17	2,347	708,966	1,694,348	41.85	Law retained
Source: Volitve
