= Vladimir Cerrón =

Peruvian politician (born 1970)

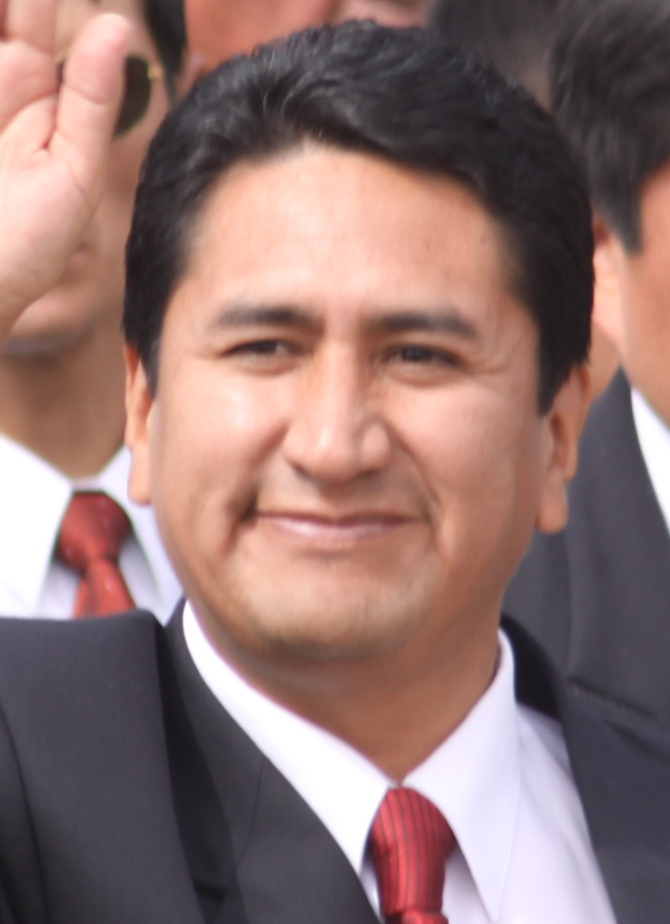
- Cerrón in 2011

General Secretary of Free Peru
- Incumbent
- Assumed office 13 August 2008
- Preceded by: Position established

Governor of Junín
- In office 1 January 2019 – 20 August 2019
- Preceded by: Ángel Unchupaico
- Succeeded by: Fernando Orihuela Rojas
- In office 1 January 2011 – 31 December 2014
- Preceded by: Vladimiro Huaroc
- Succeeded by: Ángel Unchupaico

Personal details
- Born: Vladimir Roy Cerrón Rojas; 16 December 1970 (age 55) Chupaca, Junín, Peru
- Party: Free Peru
- Other political affiliations: Peruvian Nationalist Party (2005–2006)
- Spouse: Lissette del Carmen Paez Martínez
- Education: University of Medical Sciences of Camagüey
- Alma mater: National University of San Marcos; National University of the Center of Peru
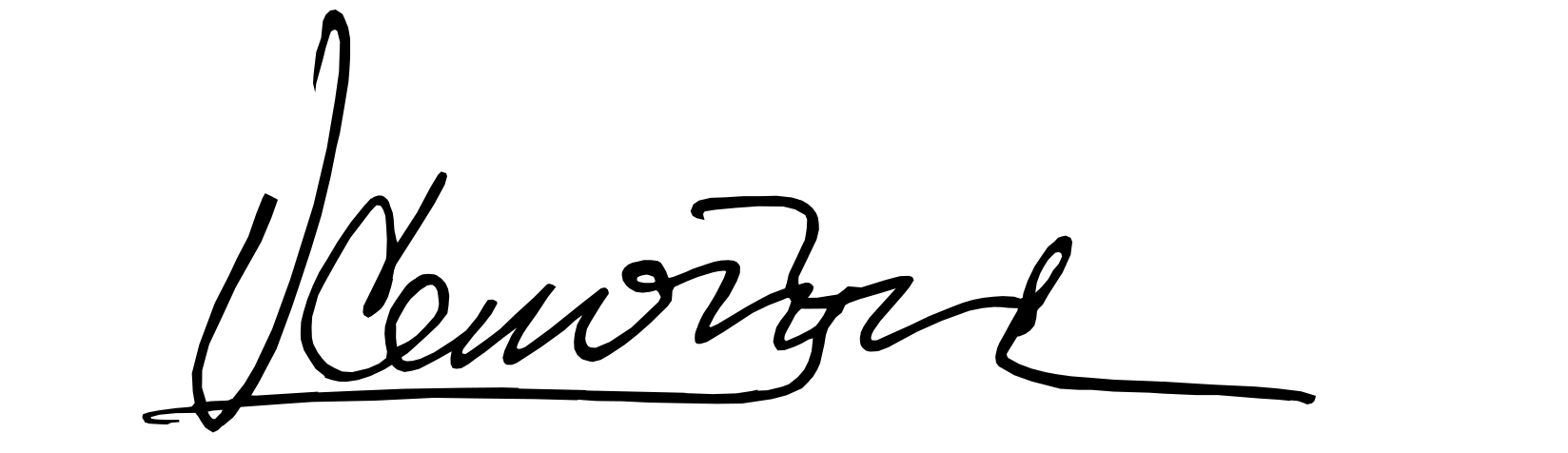
- Signature

Vladimir Roy Cerrón Rojas (born 16 December 1970) is a Peruvian neurosurgeon and politician who served as the regional Governor of Junín from 2011 to 2014 and in 2019. His second term was suspended early due to a prior criminal conviction. Seven months later, he was suspended to serve a judicial sentence for corruption. Journalist Ricardo Uceda wrote in La República that "there was no evidence" for his conviction by the Judiciary.

Cerrón is the founder and Secretary General of the Free Peru party, which won the plurality of seats in the 2021 Peruvian general election. Cerrón was also initially the candidate for Second Vice President of Peru on Pedro Castillo's eventually winning presidential ticket but was removed as the candidate before the election due to his conviction on criminal charges of corruption. He has been a fugitive from Peruvian authorities since October 2023, with Interpol placing a Blue Notice on Cerrón. He was also a presidential candidate in the 2026 general election.

== Early life ==
Cerrón was born in the district of Ahuac, Province of Chupaca in the Department of Junin on 16 December 1970. He is the son of two university professors, Jaime Cerrón Palomino and Bertha Rojas López. He received his primary education at the Sebastián Lorente school in Huancayo and high school in Santa Isabel National College in the same city. He pursued higher education studying electrical engineering at the National University of the Center of Peru and civil engineering at the Los Andes Peruvian University at the same time. This was not concluded however following the killing of his father Jaime Cerrón, then vice-rector for academic affairs at the National University of the Center of Peru, by paramilitary forces in Huancayo during the internal conflict in Peru. His father's body was found on 8 June 1990. Bertha Rojas López would later testify to the post-war Truth and Reconciliation Commission as to her husband's abduction and murder. Following this, Cerrón ended his studies and moved to Lima to work.

While in Lima, Cerrón secured a scholarship to study abroad at the Carlos J. Finlay University of Medical Sciences of Camagüey in Camagüey, Cuba, where he studied medicine and obtained a doctorate in medicine in 1997. Following this he continued to work in Camagüey at the Manuel Ascunce Domenech University Hospital. Cerrón would later return to Peru and continued medical studies there obtaining a doctorate in medicine from National University of San Marcos in 2009.

== Political career ==
In 2005, he officially entered the political life of his region, joining the Peruvian Nationalist Party until his resignation in July 2006 after this party did not win the general elections that year. In 2006, he founded the regional organization Frente Patriota Peruano. He held the position of regional political secretary of this organization between April 2006 and May 2007 when he resigned. He ran for the first time as a candidate for regional president of Junín in the 2006 elections for the Peruvian Patriot Front that he himself founded. In this election he was in third place with 16.429% of the votes.

In August 2007, he founded the Free Peru Regional Political Movement, being its legal representative and regional general secretary until January 2013 when he resigned. With this, he ran in the 2010 elections, achieving victory in the first round with 172,979 votes, which represents 33,427% of the valid votes. On 26 January 2011, on the occasion of the first annual meeting of regional leaders in the city of Lima, he was elected president of the National Assembly of Regional Governments.

In February 2012, he founded the Libertarian Peru party, of which he was legal representative and regional secretary general until May 2018. In the 2014 elections, he attempted reelection by the same Free Peru movement, remaining in second place with 26.303% of the votes and going to the Second Round together with the candidate Ángel Unchupaico. He would lose definitively in the second round after obtaining only 46.888% of the votes.

In 2016, he ran as a candidate for the presidency of the republic for the Libertarian Peru party in the 2016 general elections. As such, he registered his candidacy on 11 January 2016 but he withdrew from the race two months later due to little support for his candidacy, to prevent the party from losing its electoral registration, and to protest the National Jury of Elections for not disqualifying Keiko Fujimori.

He ran again for the Regional Governorship of Junín in the 2018 elections and was reelected as regional governor in the first round with 216,644 votes representing 36.888% of the valid votes. Although his term was scheduled to end on 31 December 2022, on 20 August 2019, the Regional Council decided to suspend him from his position as regional governor due to the criminal conviction he received as a result of the La Oroya case.

In October 2020, Pedro Castillo announced his presidential bid in the 2021 general election with Free Peru. He formally attained the nomination on 6 December 2020, confirming his ticket, which includes attorney Dina Boluarte and Cerrón, himself. He was later disqualified by the National Jury of Elections due to serving a prison sentence for corruption he is serving since 2019. In July 2022, he broke with President Pedro Castillo, publicly calling for his resignation.

== Investigations ==
He has been accused and convicted of several cases of corruption and criminal offenses in his tenure as regional governor of Junín.

=== Daniel Alcides Carrión de Huancayo Hospital case ===
In the execution of the project "Improvement of the Resolutive Capacity of the Daniel Alcides Carrión de Huancayo Hospital", the Regional Government of Junín, with Vladimir Cerrón as head, was implicated in a crime when indications of the crime of falsification of documents was observed in the companies hired to win the award in May 2013.

=== La Oroya case ===
On 5 August 2019, the Governor of Junín, Vladimir Cerrón, and the mayor of Huancayo, Henry López Cantorín, were sentenced to 4 years and 8 months in prison for the crimes of incompatible negotiation and taking advantage of their positions in the sanitation case of La Oroya during his tenure between 2011 and 2014. The sentence was handed down by the fifth anti-corruption court of the Junín Superior Court of Justice, finding them guilty of generating the payment of undue valuation in a sanitation work in Yauli, La Oroya. Additionally, he was sentenced to pay 850 thousand soles as civil compensation and his capture was ordered for his internment in the Huancayo Penitentiary Center.

=== Los Dinámicos del Centro case ===
In July 2021, Cerrón and other government and Free Peru party officials were included in the investigation for money laundering corresponding to the 'Los Dinámicos del Centro' case, an organization entrenched in the Regional Directorate of Transport and Communications (DRTC) of the regional government of Junín and investigated since 2019 for illicit financing as a result of the irregular issuance of driver's licenses. The purpose of this procurement would have been to finance Pedro Castillo's campaign for the presidency and to raise funds for Cerrón's civil reparations. Cerrón said that there was a "persecution against him" after the transfer of the investigation from Junín to Lima.

=== Wanka Aerodrome case ===
On 6 October 2023, Cerrón was sentenced to three years and six months in prison. He has been a fugitive since this sentencing, saying it was an "arbitrary sentence" that was used to disqualify him from political office. Interpol placed a Blue Notice on Cerrón weeks later.

== Publications ==
- Cerrón Rojas, Vladimir Roy (2003). Neurosurgical Emergencies. Huancayo.
- Cerrón Rojas, Vladimir Roy (2010). Nervous System Tumors. Huancayo.
- Cerrón Rojas, Vladimir Roy (2011). Censored history of the UNCP. An attempt to understand their struggles and their achievements. Huancayo.
- Cerrón Rojas, Vladimir Roy (2017). Decentralization, revolution of these times. Transcendent experiences of the socialist regional government Junín. Huancayo.
- Cerrón Rojas, Vladimir Roy (2020). Peru Libre, Ideology and Program. Huancayo.
- Cerrón Rojas, Vladimir Roy (2001). "Meningioma in the pediatric age: rare case". Neurol Journal 5 (33): 495–497.
- Cerrón Rojas, Vladimir Roy (2001). "Simultaneous cephalic migration to the intraventricular and subdural space in a ventriculoperitoneal shunt: a case report.". Neurol Journal 5 (33): 437–439.
- Cerrón Rojas, Vladimir Roy (2001). "Hyperdense brain abscess. About a case". Neurol Magazine.

Political offices
Preceded by Vladimiro Huaroc	Governor of Junín; 2011–2014	Succeeded by Ángel Unchupaico
Preceded by Ángel Unchupaico	Governor of Junín; 2019	Succeeded by Fernando Orihuela Rojas
Party political offices
New political party	General Secretary of Free Peru; 2008–present	Incumbent
