= 2022 Swiss referendums =

Federal referendums were held in Switzerland on 13 February, 15 May and 25 September 2022. Swiss referendums take three forms: popular initiatives, which are citizen proposals to create a new law and require 100,000 valid signatures on a petition to get on the ballot; facultative or optional referendums, which are citizen proposals to approve or reject a piece of existing law and require 50,000 valid signatures on a petition to get on the ballot; and mandatory referendums, which are required to revise the constitution, join an international organization or introduce emergency federal legislation for over a year.

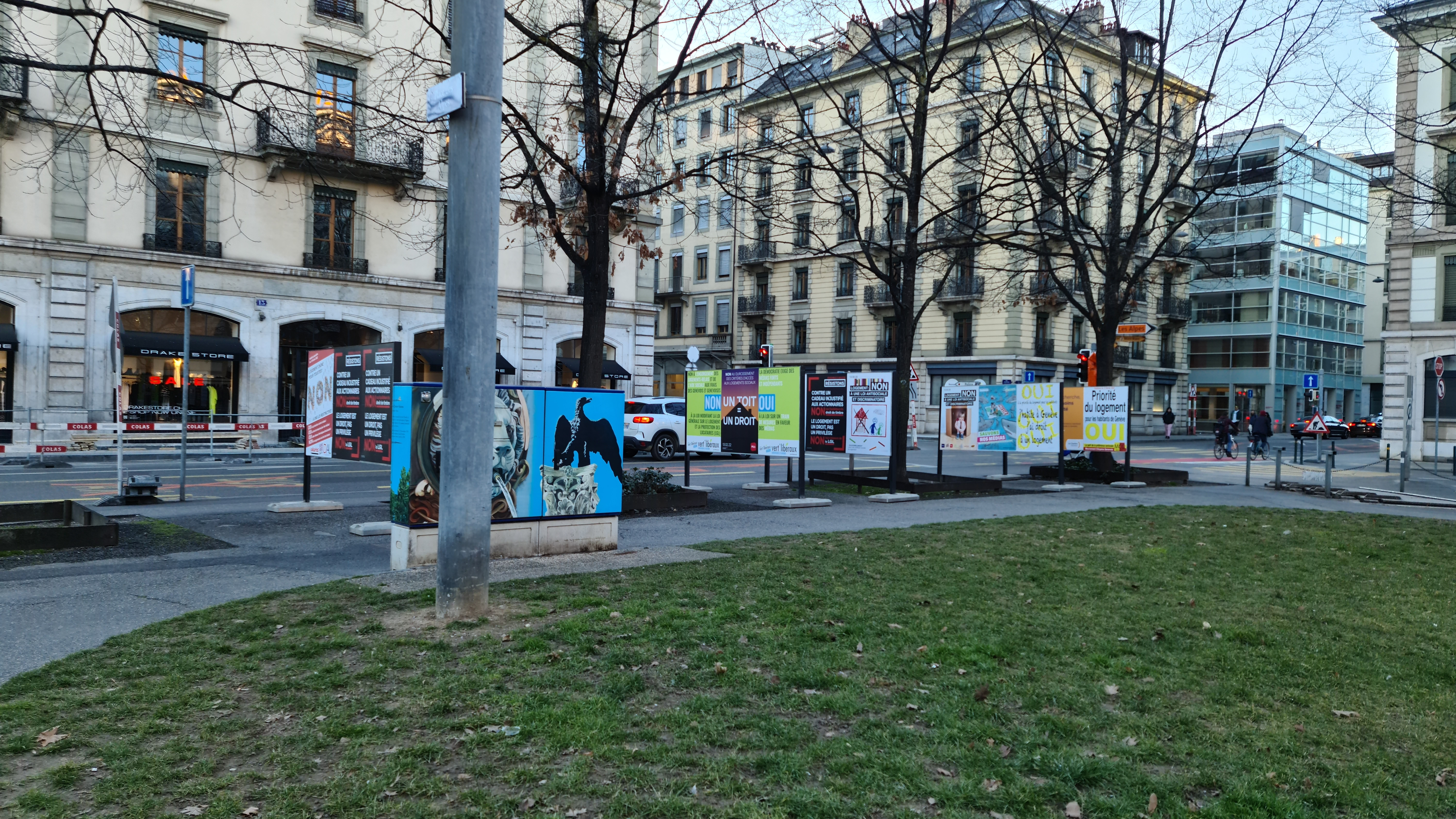
Billboards displaying posters representing stances for the referendums on stamp duty and media.

== February referendums ==
Four referendums were held on 13 February, including two popular initiatives; "Yes to the ban on animal and human experiments", and "Yes to protecting children and young adults from tobacco advertising". The other two were on the Amendment of the Federal Act on Stamp Duties and Federal Act on a Package of Measures to Benefit the Media.

=== Yes to the ban on animal and human experiments ===
The popular initiative (Ja zum Tier und Menschenversuchsverbot) proposed prohibiting experiments on living creatures, including both humans and animals. The initiative also proposed banning the import of products developed abroad using animal testing, and required non-animal research receive at least the same level of government support as animal-based research.

Proponents argued that animal testing is unnecessary, unethical, and scientifically unreliable, that the living conditions of animals used in experiments are usually inhumane, and that the current "3R" system in place has been insufficient in preventing unnecessary cruelty.

The ban was proposed by the Tierversuchsverbots-Initiative Initiativkomitee, which consists of Dr. Renato Werndli, trained biologist Irene Varga, environmental physicist Simon Kälin-Werth, naturopath Luzia Osterwalder, as well as Andreas Graf, Susi Kreis, and Cristina Clemente. The proposal was supported by over 80 organizations, including CIVIS-Schweitz and other animal welfare groups, as well as doctors, scientists, and local businesses.

The Federal Council opposed the initiative, claiming that existing regulations were restrictive enough to prevent cruelty, and that a ban on animal experiments would disadvantage Switzerland by preventing the development of new medical therapies and endangering jobs.

The Swiss National Science Foundation, swissuniversities, and the Swiss Academy of Medical Science expressed opposition to the referendum, arguing that it would "have extreme and damaging consequences for research, healthcare treatment, competitiveness and...innovation potential".

All eleven major parties opposed the move, with opinion polls suggesting 80% of the electorate were opposed.

=== Yes to protecting children and young adults from tobacco advertising ===
The initiative (Ja zum Schutz der Kinder und Jugendlichen vor Tabakwerbung) proposed banning advertising tobacco products, including e-cigarettes, on platforms accessible to children, including print newspapers, magazines, public posters, the internet, in cinemas, kiosks or public events. Ads directed at adults and located in places that minors cannot access would still be permitted.

The Federal Council and Parliament opposed this measure as over-broad and economically restrictive, and countered the initiative with the new Tobacco Products Act (Tabakproduktegesetz), which banned advertising tobacco products and e-cigarettes on billboards and in cinemas, and forbids tobacco companies from giving away free cigarettes or sponsoring international events in Switzerland. The Tobacco Products Act may be enacted regardless of the outcome of the vote on the popular initiative.

The political parties in support included the Green Liberal Party, the Evangelical People's Party, the Federal Democratic Union, Green Party, and the Social Democratic Party.

The Centre (Die Mitte) opposed the initiative, though The Center-Women (Die Mitte-Frauen) and 9 cantonal Die Mitte sections support it.

Opposing parties included FDP.The Liberals and the Swiss People's Party.

=== Amendment of the Federal Act on Stamp Duties ===
The Amendment of the Federal Act on Stamp Duties was a proposal to abolish the Issuance Tax (Emissionsabgabe), a 1% tax on capital paid by companies on new equity capital. The tax is only levied on amounts over one million Swiss francs, and as a rule, small companies do not pay it; the tax revenue comes primarily from medium-sized and large companies.

The passage of the amendment would allow companies to raise new equity without paying taxes on it. Proponents claimed that the amendment would have a positive effect on Switzerland's attractiveness as a location, and would generate growth and jobs.

Opponents of the amendment argued that the abolition of the tax would reduce income for the federal government by an estimated CHF 250 million per year. According to the opponent Committee, large international corporations, banks and insurance companies would benefit from the abolition of the Issuance Tax, while citizens would gain nothing from it; on the contrary, they would have to pay higher taxes or accept a reduction in state services.

Parties in favor of the amendment were the Swiss People's Party, and the FDP.The Liberals, the Green Liberal Party, and The Centre (Die Mitte).

Parties that opposed the amendment include the Federal Democratic Union, the Green Party, the Evangelical People's Party, and the Social Democratic Party.

=== Federal Act on a Package of Measures to Benefit the Media ===
The Federal Act on a Package of Measures to Benefit the Media (Bundesgesetz über ein Massnahmenpaket zugunsten der Medien) proposed extending the federal government's existing subsidy on the delivery of subscription newspapers to newspapers with a larger circulation, early-morning deliveries, online media, local radio stations, and regional television. Support would be provided on condition that media outlets concerned primarily address a Swiss audience and deal with a range of political, business and social topics. The measures would be financed by revenues from the existing radio and television tax, and from the federal budget. In the case of newspapers and online media, support would be provided for a period of seven years.

The committee in opposition argued that the law would waste public money to benefit wealthy publishers. The committee was also wary to make all media into state media, and argued in favor of independent media.

=== Results ===
Question	For			Against			Invalid/ blank	Total votes	Registered voters	Turnout	Outcome
Question	Votes	%	Cantons	Votes	%	Cantons	Invalid/ blank	Total votes	Registered voters	Turnout	Outcome
Ban on animal and human experiments	499,485	20.86	0	1,895,061	79.14	20 6/2	50,824	2,445,370	5,532,520	44.20	Rejected
Limiting tobacco advertising	1,371,177	56.65	14 2/2	1,049,107	43.35	6 4/2	27,368	2,447,652	5,532,520	44.24	Approved
Stamp duties act amendment	883,251	37.37	–	1,480,165	62.63	–	72,452	2,435,868	5,532,520	44.03	Rejected
Measures to benefit the media	1,084,802	45.42	–	1,303,644	54.58	–	53,771	2,442,217	5,532,520	44.14	Rejected
Source: Federal Chancellery

== May referendums ==
Three referendums were held on 15 May:

- Introducing a tax on streaming services such as Disney+ and Netflix, which would fund local audio and/or audiovisual productions, as well as requiring that at least 30 percent of streaming content available in Switzerland be produced in Europe.
- Introducing presumed consent for organ donation (unless otherwise stated by a person or relative(s); applies only to people who die in hospital in intensive care).
- An increase in the Swiss government's contribution to the Frontex border agency.

All proposals were approved.

=== Results ===
Question	For		Against		Invalid/ blank	Total votes	Registered voters	Turnout	Outcome
Question	Votes	%	Votes	%	Invalid/ blank	Total votes	Registered voters	Turnout	Outcome
Amendment of the Federal Law on Film Production and Film Culture	1,255,038	58.42	893,370	41.58	68,734	2,217,142	5,538,252	40.03	Approved
Amendment of the Federal Law on the Transplantation of Organs, Tissues and Cells	1,319,276	60.20	872,119	39.80	38,319	2,229,714	5,538,252	40.26	Approved
Adoption of the EU regulation on the European Border and Coast Guard	1,523,005	71.48	607,673	28.52	83,550	2,214,228	5,538,252	39.98	Approved
Source: Federal Chancellery

== September referendums ==
On 25 September four referendums were held, including one popular initiative.

=== Popular initiative on factory farming ===
The initiative aims at banning intensive farming, including on imported products.

=== Financing of retirement insurance by increasing VAT ===
In order to stabilise revenue for the Old-Age and Survivor's Insurance (OASI), the OASI-21 (AVS / AHV 21) plan purports to increase VAT rates from 2.5 to 2.6% (reduced rate) and from 7.7 to 8.1% (standard rate). This is a constitutional amendment subject to mandatory vote. Since both this VAT increase and uniformized retirement age are part of the same program, either one being rejected would in effect see the whole reform process fail.

=== Modification of the law on retirement and survivor insurance ===
With the aim of stabilising revenue for the State-guaranteed part of pensions, the OASI-21 (AVS / AHV 21) plan purports to apply a uniform retirement age, meaning that women would then retire at 65 (up from 64). A referendum against this change was demanded. Since both the VAT increase and uniformized retirement age are part of the same program, either one being rejected would in effect see the whole reform process fail.

=== Amendment to the Federal Act on Withholding Tax ===
The bill would exempt domestic bonds from withholding tax. It also abolishes sales tax on domestic bonds and other securities.

=== Results ===
Question	For			Against			Invalid/ blank	Total votes	Registered voters	Turnout	Outcome
Question	Votes	%	Cantons	Votes	%	Cantons	Invalid/ blank	Total votes	Registered voters	Turnout	Outcome
Popular initiative against factory farming	1,062,703	37.13	0 1/2	1,799,088	62.87	20 5/2	39,098	2,900,889	5,549,085	52.28	Rejected
Federal Decree on additional financing of the AVS/AHV through an increase in VAT	1,570,813	55.07	15 6/2	1,281,447	44.93	5 0/2	42,302	2,894,562	5,549,085	52.16	Approved
Amendment of the Federal Act on Old-Age and Survivors' Insurance (AVS/AHV 21)	1,442,591	50.55	–	1,411,396	49.45	–	41,822	2,895,809	5,549,085	52.19	Approved
Amendment of the Federal Act on Withholding Tax (Strengthening the Debt Capital Market)	1,316,230	47.99	–	1,426,457	52.01	–	126,571	2,869,258	5,549,085	51.71	Rejected
Source: Federal Chancellery

== November referendums ==
The date of 27 November was reserved for possible referendums, but due to none being ready to be voted on, the Federal Chancellery decreed there would be no votes on the date.
