= Edward Málaga =

Peruvian politician (born 1969)

Member of Congress
- In office 27 July 2021 – 26 July 2026
- Constituency: Lima

Personal details
- Born: George Edward Málaga Trillo; 6 June 1969 (age 57) Lima, Peru
- Party: Go on Country (2024–present); Purple Party (2020–2022)
- Education: Cayetano Heredia University; University of Miami

George Edward Málaga Trillo (born 6 June 1969) is a Peruvian musician, neurobiologist and politician. He was elected member of the Peruvian Congress of the Republic for Lima for the 2021–2026 parliamentary period with the Purple Party. He is considered non-grouped in the absence of two members (five at least) to form a party caucus.

== Biography ==
Málaga was born in Lima on 6 June 1969, the son of a medical father and mother, who inspired him to pursue a scientific career. In addition, he studied at the María Reina Marianistas School, where he was a classmate of musician Pedro Suárez-Vértiz, with who would collaborate in musical projects such as Arena Hash, before dedicating himself completely to his career as a neurobiologist.

Málaga studied Biology at Cayetano Heredia University (UPCH) and then completed his PhD in microbiology and immunology at the University of Miami School of Medicine and the Max Planck Institute for Biology in Tübingen, Germany. After these academic experiences, he decided to settle in Germany for postdoctoral fellowships in Evolutionary Genomics and Developmental Neurobiology at the University of Konstanz, where he was later appointed Assistant Professor and then Associate Professor of the Department of Developmental Neurobiology.

The Málaga Trillo group was a pioneer in using zebrafish embryos to study the molecular mechanisms of prion neurodegeneration (mad cow disease, Creutzfeldt-Jakob disease in humans, etc.). The zebrafish is a novel animal model, widely used in biomedical research to study embryonic development, as well as the causes and mechanisms of human diseases.

In 2015, Málaga returned to the UPCH and founded the Laboratory of Developmental Neurobiology and Zebra Fish, dedicated to understanding and curing neurodegenerative diseases. Since 2018, he has been president of the Latin American Zebrafish Network (LAZEN), an animal model widely used in biomedical research. And, since 2020, scientific ambassador of the DAAD (German Academic Exchange Service) in Peru. Position through which he promotes scientific cooperation between Peruvian and German researchers and students. Since the beginning of the COVID-19 pandemic, he has been directly involved in the fight against the pandemic, redirecting his laboratory at UPCH in order to implement new technologies for the molecular diagnosis of the disease.

== Political career ==
=== Congressman (2021–2026) ===
In late 2020, Málaga was invited by the Purple Party to run as a candidate for the Congress of the Republic in the 2021 general election. He carried out a political campaign based on the phrase "Without science there is no future", a phrase with which he promoted a programmatic agenda based on science, technology and innovation in which the participation and involvement of the scientific community from inside and outside is highlighted. of the country as a fundamental element for the success of the policies. The electoral elections were held on 11 April 2021, and Málaga was elected with 67,047 votes, being the fifth congressman with the highest number of votes. On 26 July, he was sworn in as congressman of the republic.

On 29 November 2022, Málaga presented the presidential vacancy motion of Pedro Castillo for "moral ineptitude". This resulted in the removal and subsequent arrest of Castillo.
