= Aníbal Torres =

Prime Minister of Peru in 2022

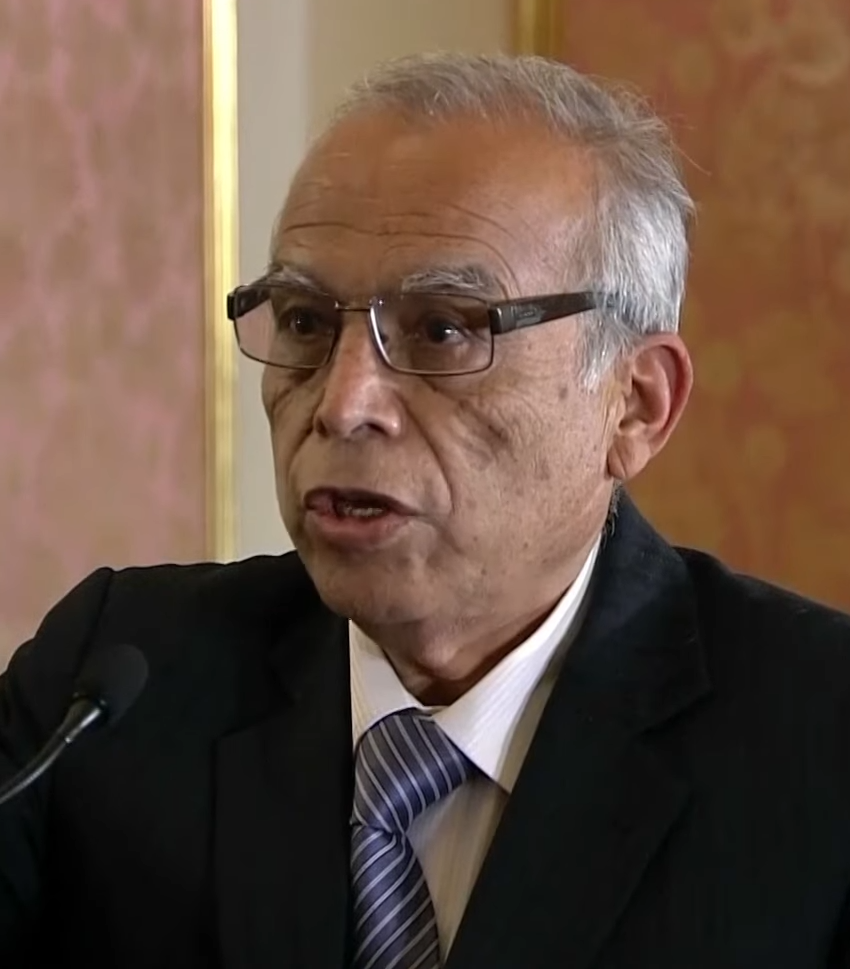
- Torres in 2022

Prime Minister of Peru
- In office 8 February 2022 – 25 November 2022
- President: Pedro Castillo
- Preceded by: Héctor Valer
- Succeeded by: Betssy Chávez

Minister of Justice and Human Rights
- In office 30 July 2021 – 8 February 2022
- President: Pedro Castillo
- Prime Minister: Guido Bellido; Mirtha Vásquez; Héctor Valer
- Preceded by: Eduardo Vega Luna
- Succeeded by: Ángel Yldefonso

Personal details
- Born: Aníbal Torres Vásquez; 28 December 1942 (age 83) Chota, Peru
- Party: Independent
- Education: National University of San Marcos (LLB, MA, PhD)
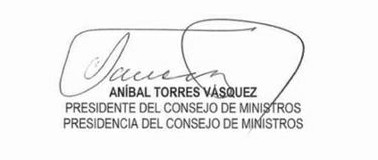
- Signature

Aníbal Torres Vásquez (born 28 December 1942) is a Peruvian lawyer, jurist, and politician who served as prime minister of Peru from February 2022 to November 2022. He was also Minister of Justice and Human Rights from July 2021 to February 2022 under the government of Pedro Castillo.

== Career ==
Torres was born in Chota, Cajamarca. He was a lawyer and university professor at the National University of San Marcos. He graduated as a lawyer in 1970 and as a doctor, in Law and Political Science, from the same university in 1987. He studied Civil and Commercial Law at the Universitá Degli Studi di Roma (1970–1971).

He was director and dean of the Lima Bar Association, dean of the Faculty of Law and Political Science of the National University of San Marcos, President of the Board of Deans of the Peruvian Bar Associations, honorary president of the Peruvian Academy of Laws, member of the Patriotic Commission for the Defense of the Mar de Grau, the Peruvian Institute of Air Law, the Academy of Aeronautical History of Peru, honorary member of the bar associations of Loreto, Puno, Cusco, Cajamarca, and Apurímac. He is the author of various publications on civil law and administrative law.

== Political career ==
=== 2011 general election ===
At the 2011 Peruvian general election, Torres unsuccessfully ran for a seat in the Peruvian Congress with Peru Wins for the constituency of Lima.

=== 2021 general election ===
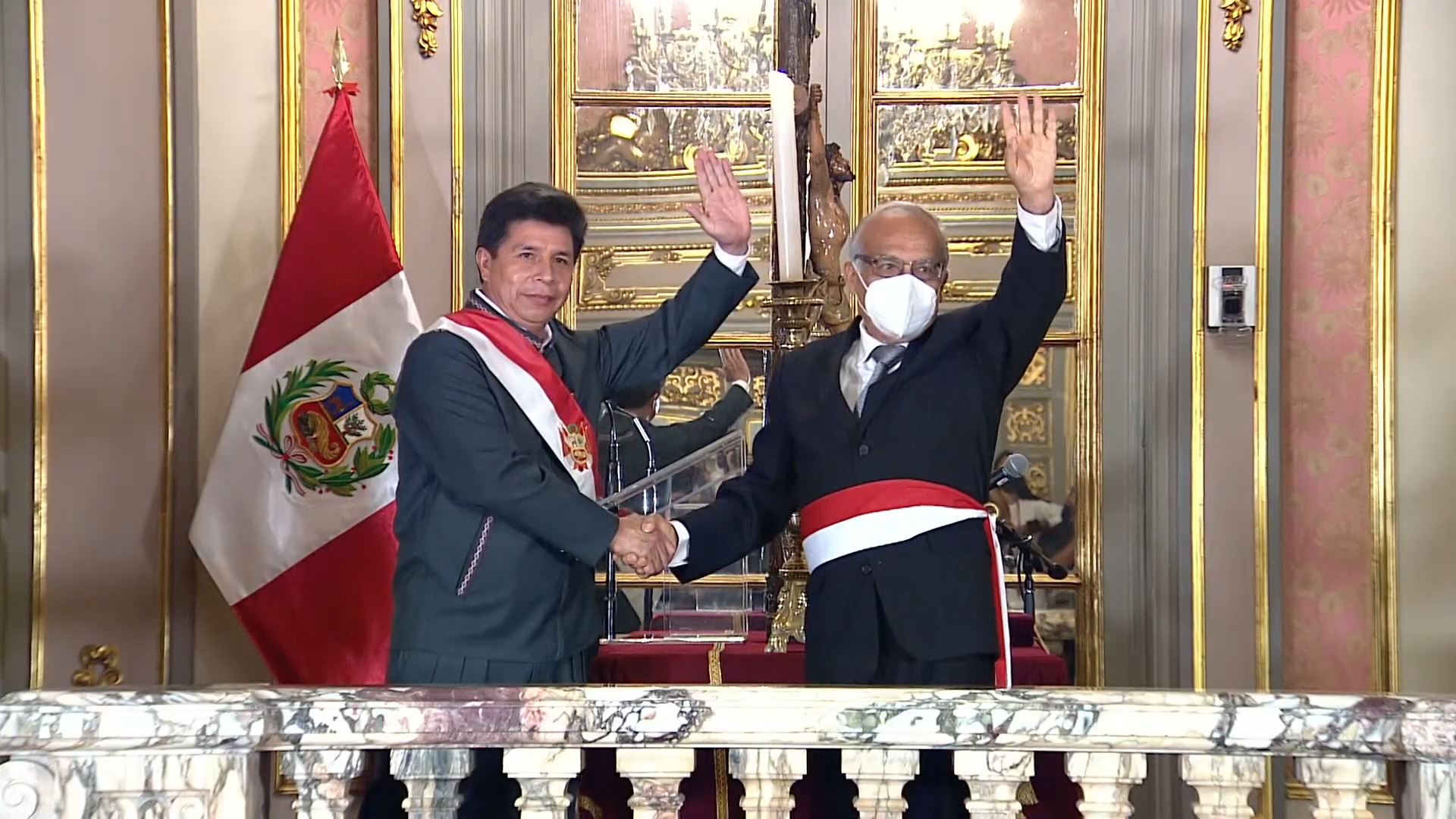
Torres with Pedro Castillo after his inauguration.

Torres supported Yonhy Lescano, Popular Action's presidential nominee in the first round of the 2021 Peruvian general election. For the second round of the general election, Torres became the main legal advisor for Pedro Castillo's presidential campaign. Castillo would ultimately win the election.

=== Minister of Justice and Human Rights ===
On 30 July 2021, Torres was appointed Minister of Justice and Human Rights by Pedro Castillo at the start of his presidential term.

=== Prime Minister of Peru (2022) ===
On 8 February 2022, Torres was sworn in as Prime Minister of Peru, succeeding the short-lived and disgraced Héctor Valer in the position. He became the fourth cabinet head in less than a year in the Castillo administration.

On 22 April 2022, Torres stated to the IV Decentralized Council of Ministers that "some senior military members speak in the same direction to carry out the coup d'état" against Castillo. He also stated they were planning to place "the lady who lost the elections" in power, in a clear reference to Keiko Fujimori and her loss in the 2021 general election.

On 3 August 2022, Torres resigned as Prime Minister, claiming personal reasons. At the time, President Castillo was facing five separate criminal investigations. The resignation was rejected by President Castillo.

On 24 November 2022, Torres resigned again. It was accepted and Minister of Culture Betssy Chávez was selected by President Castillo to replace him.

Political offices
Preceded by Eduardo Vega Luna	Minister of Justice and Human Rights; 2021–2022	Succeeded by Ángel Yldefonso
Preceded by Héctor Valer	Prime Minister of Peru; 2022	Succeeded by Betssy Chávez
