= Héctor Valer =

Peruvian politician (born 1959)

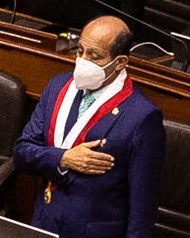
- Valer in 2021

Prime Minister of Peru
- In office 1 February 2022 – 8 February 2022
- President: Pedro Castillo
- Preceded by: Mirtha Vásquez
- Succeeded by: Aníbal Torres

Member of Congress
- In office 27 July 2021 – 26 July 2026
- Constituency: Lima

Personal details
- Born: Hector Valer Pinto; 4 February 1959 (age 67) Abancay, Peru
- Party: We Are Peru (since 2023)
- Other political affiliations: Democratic Peru (until 2022); We Are Peru – Purple Party (2021–2022); Popular Renewal (until 2021); Peru Nation (until 2018); Union for Peru (until 2014); Peruvian Aprista Party (until 2010)
- Spouse: Ana María Montoya Leo (died 2021)

Héctor Valer Pinto (born 4 February 1959) is a Peruvian politician who served as Prime Minister of Peru from 1 February 2022 to 8 February 2022.

Originally elected to the Peruvian Congress as a invited candidate of the Popular Renewal party, Valer was subsequently expelled from the elected caucus for supporting Pedro Castillo in the aftermath of the second round of the 2021 Peruvian general election. After a brief stint in the We Are Peru – Purple Party caucus, Valer currently sits with the Democratic Peru caucus, composed primarily of former Free Peru lawmakers.

Valer was appointed prime minister by President Pedro Castillo on 1 February 2022, following the resignation of Mirtha Vásquez. Following his designation as Prime Minister of Peru by President Pedro Castillo, it was revealed that his daughter and his wife had denounced him for physical abuse in 2016. On 5 February 2022, before the confidence vote requested for that day was even scheduled by congress, Valer announced that he would resign from his position and denied the accusations, saying that the right-wing elements of Peru were responsible for the reports.

When discussing in Congress about those killed in the Juliaca massacre during the 2022–2023 Peruvian protests, Valer issued a terruqueo attack by placing an image of a hammer and sickle near the images of the victims, stating that the dead held "the attitude of those who use the masses and who militate in the Shining Path, who continue to have a communist ideology".

== Political positions ==
Valer initially began his political career within a far-right party, and he holds ultra-conservative positions according to The Guardian. He was in opposition of sex education and has been observed using sexist language.

Political offices
Preceded by Mirtha Vásquez	Prime Minister of Peru; 2022	Succeeded by Aníbal Torres
