= Mirtha Vásquez =

Peruvian lawyer and politician (born 1975)

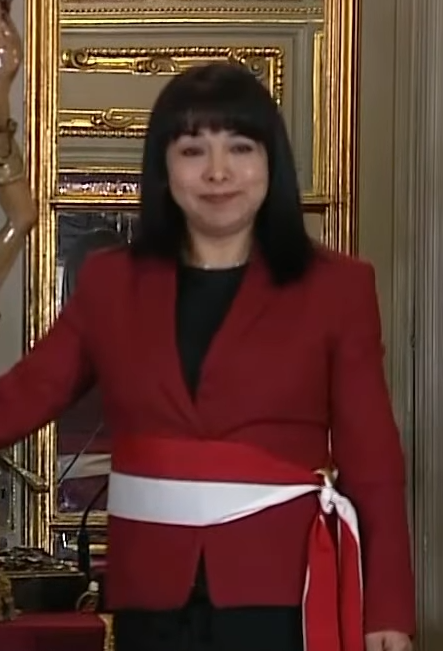
- Vásquez in 2021

Prime Minister of Peru
- In office 6 October 2021 – 1 February 2022
- President: Pedro Castillo
- Preceded by: Guido Bellido
- Succeeded by: Héctor Valer

President of Congress
- Acting; 17 November 2020 – 26 July 2021
- Vice President: 2nd Vice President; Luis Roel Alva; 3rd Vice President; Matilde Fernández
- Preceded by: Francisco Sagasti
- Succeeded by: Maricarmen Alva

First Vice President of Congress
- In office 16 November 2020 – 26 July 2021
- President: Francisco Sagasti; Herself (acting)
- Preceded by: Luis Valdez Farías
- Succeeded by: Lady Camones

Senator of the Republic
- Incumbent
- Assumed office 26 July 2026
- Constituency: Nationwide

Member of Congress
- In office 16 March 2020 – 26 July 2021
- Constituency: Cajamarca

Personal details
- Born: 31 March 1975 (age 51) Cajamarca, Peru
- Party: Ahora Nación (since 2026)
- Other political affiliations: Broad Front (2020–2026)
- Spouse: Paulo Mejía
- Children: 2
- Education: National University of Cajamarca (LLB); Pontifical Catholic University of Peru (MA)

Mirtha Esther Vásquez Chuquilín (born 31 March 1975) is a Peruvian attorney and politician who served as prime minister of Peru from 6 October 2021 to 31 January 2022. Previously, she briefly served in Congress for the complementary term between March 2020 and July 2021, representing the constituency of Cajamarca as an independent within the Broad Front parliamentary caucus.

== Early life and education ==
Born in the northern region of Cajamarca, Vásquez earned a law degree from National University of Cajamarca and subsequently attained a master's degree in social management at the Pontifical Catholic University of Peru.

== Career ==
Vásquez has been a lecturer at her alma mater, the National University of Cajamarca. She has also served as an attorney and executive secretary for Grufides, a human rights and environment protection think-tank based in Cajamarca. She also defended the Association for Human Rights (APRODEH), and served as a member of the Board of Directors of the National Coordinator of Human Rights. She was also a columnist for Noticias SER.

Elected to the Peruvian Congress in the 2020 parliamentary election, Vásquez represented the Cajamarca constituency and the Broad Front coalition as an independent. Following Manuel Merino's resignation as President of Peru on 15 November 2020, she was elected First Vice President of Congress, as part of the congressional list led by Francisco Sagasti. As Sagasti took over the presidency via constitutional succession as President of Congress, Vásquez served ad interim in the position.

On 6 October 2021, Vásquez was appointed as the prime minister of Peru by president Pedro Castillo. She is the sixth woman to hold the office. She resigned on 31 January 2022, precipitating a cabinet reshuffle by Castillo.

Following her tenure in the Castillo government, she participated in political commentary, with the Washington Post describing her as "one of the few seen as being genuinely committed to democracy and the rule of law" in Peru.
