= Free Peru =

Political party in Peru

Free Peru Perú Libre
- Abbreviation: PL
- General Secretary: Vladimir Cerrón
- Parliamentary spokesperson: Waldemar Cerrón
- Founded: 13 August 2008; 18 years ago
- Registered: 15 January 2016; 10 years ago
- Headquarters: Huancayo, Junín; Breña, Lima
- Membership (2020): 5,204
- Ideology: Socialism; Marxism; Left-wing populism; Mariateguism; Social conservatism
- Political position: Left-wing to far-left
- Regional affiliation: São Paulo Forum
- Colours: Red
- Slogan: ¡No más pobres en un país rico! ('No more poor in a rich country!')
- Congress: 0 / 130
- Governorships: 0 / 25
- Regional Councillors: 5 / 274
- Province Mayorships: 3 / 196
- District Mayorships: 73 / 1,874

Party flag

Website
- perulibre.pe

Free Peru (Spanish: Perú Libre), officially the Free Peru National Political Party (Spanish: Partido Político Nacional Perú Libre), is a Marxist political party in Peru. Founded in 2008 as the Free Peru Political Regional Movement, the party was officially constituted as a national organization in February 2012 under the name Libertarian Peru. It was registered as a political party in January 2016 and adopted its current name, Free Peru, in January 2019. Its presidential candidate Pedro Castillo won the 2021 Peruvian general election against Popular Force nominee Keiko Fujimori. Free Peru has the third most seats in the Congress of Peru, with 11 out of 130 total representatives; however, its opposition continued to rule Congress after forming a larger alliance of seats led by the Popular Action party. Free Peru is a participant in the São Paulo Forum, an annual conference of leftist parties in the Americas.

== History ==
The party was founded in August 2008 by former Junín governor Vladimir Cerrón. Cerrón had been elected in 2018 for a second non-consecutive term as governor, but his tenure was cut short due to the sentence. Still, he formally leads the party in his position of Secretary-General. Cerrón ran as a presidential candidate in the 2016 Peruvian general election, and registered his candidacy on 11 January 2016 but withdrew from the race two months later due to little support in his candidacy and also to prevent the party from losing its electoral registration. In the 2018 regional and municipal elections, Cerrón took the businessman, journalist, and radio host Ricardo Belmont as a candidate for the Metropolitan Municipality of Lima, obtaining 3.89% of the votes validly cast in Lima.

In the 2020 Peruvian parliamentary election held on 26 January, the party won 3.4% of the popular vote but no seats in the Congress of the Republic of Peru, as the party failed to reach the electoral threshold. Months before the election, the party was in talks with the Together for Peru coalition and New Peru in order to run allied in the parliamentary election; however, due to Cerrón's criminal profile and many prominent New Peru members quitting their party as the union materialized, the alliance fell through and the parties ran separately in the election, in which neither achieved representation. Their presidential nominee, Pedro Castillo, unexpectedly took the lead in the first round of the 2021 Peruvian general election, after seeing a surprise surge in support starting around one month before the election. After his victory in the first electoral round, Castillo asked to dialogue with other Peruvian political forces in order to achieve political agreement; however, he ruled out making a roadmap as Ollanta Humala did, maintaining ideological discourse. On 6 June, Castillo won the second-round run-off election for president.

In January 2022, vice president Dina Boluarte was expelled from Free Peru by Vladimir Cerrón after she stated during an interview with La República that she had never embraced the party's ideology. Cerrón said that Boluarte's comments threatened party unity. Her departure was followed by President Castillo's several months later, in June 2022, when he resigned from the party following a request by Cerrón. The latter accused Castillo of implementing policies out of step with Free Peru.

== Ideology ==
The party describes itself as "a left-wing socialist organization" that supports anti-imperialism, democracy, decentralization, federalism, humanism, internationalism, Latin American integration, and sovereignty. The party claims to uphold the works of Karl Marx, Friedrich Engels, Vladimir Lenin, and José Carlos Mariátegui. Free Peru's political position has been variously described by observers as left-wing, to far-left, and the party's ideology has been described as Marxist, Marxist–Leninist, Left-wing populist, and socialist.

Both Pedro Castillo, Vladimir Cerrón, and the whole party have taken conservative stances on social issues, as did their right-wing opponents, including opposing same-sex marriage, but supports the decriminalization of abortion. Following his success in the first round of the 2021 presidential election, Castillo said that he opposes Chavismo and Nicolás Maduro, distanced himself from those on the far-left in the party, would not nationalize industry, and would honor the rule of law to placate market alarmism, adding that he would lead the party instead of Cerrón.

=== Domestic ===
In domestic affairs, Free Peru is opposed to neoliberalism and states that their party seeks "to rescue the minimized, almost imperceptible and dying State from the subjugation of market dictatorship". Free Peru says that when Peru adopted neoliberalism and markets were deregulated, foreign companies assumed control of the economy, exploitation of labor increased, inequality grew and the country was led "to a neocolony condition". Initially, the nationalization of mines, gas, oil, hydroelectricity, and telecommunications in order to fund social programs was a goal of Free Peru; however, in an attempt to appease foreign business interests, Castillo promised that his government would not nationalize industry within Peru. At the same time, he reaffirmed his party's position of defending the distribution of wealth.

Cerrón initially said that Free Peru is opposed to Fujimorism, though IDL-Reporteros reported that the party has formed an alliance with Fujimorists in the government due to their widespread power with Peru's institutions. While initially supportive of decriminalizing abortion, the party later came out in support of existing restrictions. In December 2019, Cerrón said he changed his mind about discussing gender in school curriculum and accepted it.

=== International ===
Internationally, Cerrón has emphasized the party "defends revolutionary processes in the world, especially in Latin America: Cuba, Nicaragua, Ecuador, Venezuela and Bolivia". Free Peru has shared praise for some of the policies of Fidel Castro and Hugo Chávez for their foreign policy and regional solidarity. The party also opposes the Lima Group.

In an article published on the party's website, Cerrón praised the rule of Russian president Vladimir Putin.

During his candidacy for the 2021 presidential elections, Castillo defended the government of Nicolás Maduro in Venezuela, describing it as "a democratic government". He would later retract his statements, stating that "[t]here is no Chavismo here", and saying of President Maduro, "if there is something he has to say concerning Peru, that he first fix his internal problems". The party described the Venezuelan refugee crisis as a human trafficking issue, with Castillo saying that Venezuelans were in Peru "to commit crimes".

== Election results ==
=== Presidential ===
Election	Candidate	First round		Second round		Result
Election	Candidate	Votes	%	Votes	%	Result
2016	Vladimir Cerrón	Withdrawn				Lost ✗
2021	Pedro Castillo	2,724,752	18.92	8,836,380	50.13	Won ✓
2026	Vladimir Cerrón	100,073	0.60	—N/a		Lost ✗

=== Unicameral Congress of the Republic ===
Election	Leader	Votes	%	Seats	+/–	Rank	Government
2020	Vladimir Cerrón	502,898	3.40	0 / 130		13th	Extra-parliamentary
2021	Vladimir Cerrón	1,724,354	13.41	37 / 130	▲37	▲1st	Minority government

==== Chamber of Deputies ====
Election	Leader	Votes	%	Seats	+/–	Rank	Government
2026	Vladimir Cerrón	138,137	0.96	0 / 130	▼37	▼19th	Extra-parliamentary

==== Senate ====
Election	Leader	Votes	%	Seats	+/–	Rank	Government
2026	Vladimir Cerrón	112,132	0.76	0 / 60		▲23th	Extra-parliamentary

=== Regional and municipal elections ===
Year	Regional governors	Provincial mayors	District mayors
Year	Outcome	Outcome	Outcome
2010	1 / 25	0 / 196	24 / 1,639
2014	0 / 25	0 / 195	12 / 1,647
2018	1 / 25	5 / 196	29 / 1,678
2022	0 / 25	3 / 196	73 / 1,678

== See also ==
- Pink tide
- Socialism of the 21st century
