= Censorship in Peru =

Censorship in Peru has been prevalent throughout its history. There have been multiple shifts in the level of freedom of the press in Peru, starting in the late 1900s when the country was oppressed, to the early 2000s when the country experienced more freedom; only recently has the country been ranked as partly free. After the neoliberal economic policies implemented in the 1990s stabilized the national economy and led it to an economic boom in the 21st century, usage of TV and access to internet has vastly increased, leading to more spaces of expression.

== History ==
=== The period of military rule (1968–1980) ===
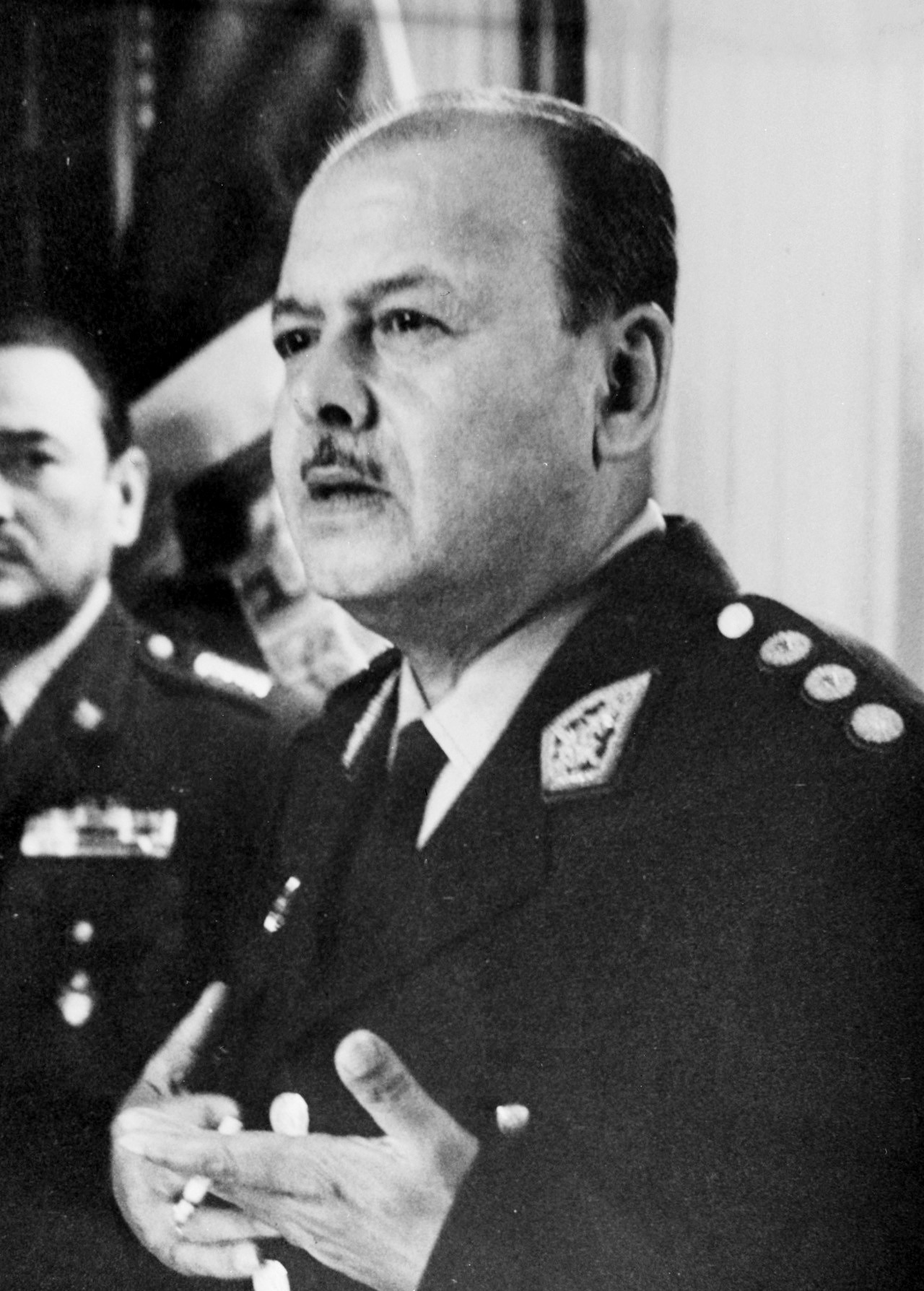
Juan Velasco Alvarado

Press freedom in Peru underwent its worst stage during the military regime, also known as the Peruvian Military Junta, led by Juan Velasco Alvarado in 1968 to 1980. The president implemented a new press law ordering the expropriation of all national newspapers in 1974. Newspapers were closed and publishers were accused of distorting their reports to influence the public, after which the publishers were sent into exile. Velasco expropriated the country's major newspapers, as well as the main television channels and radio stations.

Print and broadcast media were subjected to censorship. Only media platforms that shared the regime's main aims, to align the means of communication with the social interest of Velasco, were allowed to operate. Velasco used government-appointed bureaucrats to look over the articles being published, such that the papers published resembled the military regime's principles. Hector Cornejo Chavez was one of the figures appointed to overlook El Comercio as he was one of Velasco's must trusted advisers.

Even though Velasco managed to hide opposing opinions on the regime coming from newspapers or mass media platforms, a few independent press organizations managed to survive throughout the late 1970s.

=== The Fujimori decade (1990–2000) ===
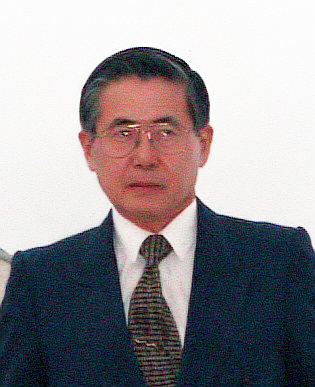
Alberto Fujimori

Peru underwent an internal war characterised by the rise of Shining Path's guerrillas, and terrorist actions, which led Peru under military rule. Peruvian journalists continued to have problems of freedom of the press concerning economic instability and threats from the growing guerrilla movements. In the late 1980s, the Peruvian Armed Forces drafted plans that involved the genocide of impoverished and indigenous Peruvians, the control or censorship of media in the nation and the establishment of a neoliberal economy controlled by a military junta in Peru.

During his campaigning for the 1990 Peruvian general election, Alberto Fujimori expressed concern against the proposed neoliberal policies, though after taking office and being approached by the military, Fujimori abandoned the economic platform he promoted during his campaign, adopting more aggressive neoliberal policies than those espoused by his competitor in the election. Fujimori would go on to adopt many of the policies outlined in Plan Verde and serve as a figurehead leader under Vladimiro Montesinos and the Peruvian Armed Forces.

The Fujimori government did not intervene directly since most media platforms agreed with his objectives, thus maintaining the regime's stability. From 1992 to 2000, much of the information in Peru was controlled by Vladimiro Montesinos, with the government allowing a meager opposition media to exist only to deflect criticism from governments of the Western world and to warn of rising crises from opponents. During the 1992 Peruvian self-coup led by Fujimori, troops occupied newspaper buildings, forcing journalists to show them news stories before these are published. These measures against newspapers, radio and television stations began at 10:30pm on 5 April 1992 and remained for forty hours until 7 April, limiting initial reporting on the coup from domestic media. Fujimori requested the troops to leave the buildings and visited El Comercio to apologize for their actions in the portrayal of their authoritative regime as a dictatorship, while also mentioning the existence of unrestricted press freedom in Peru. During the period, only the Fujimori government was granted to communicate with the public and all newspapers were printed under military observation and contained similar content; every publication was ordered to not include the word "coup". According to of Manuel D'Ornellas of Expreso in 1994, the military's oversight of newspaper following the coup was only momentary due to international condemnation Fujimori received. Montesinos was not concerned about press coverage in newspapers due to their limited distribution amongst the upper classes in Lima; he instead focused on controlling Peru's television channels.

Montesinos would pay media organizations for positive coverage and to assist with maintaining the presidency. He eventually controlled six of the seven main television channels in Peru. Payoffs and promises of legal leniency were made to multiple chicha press tabloids, the newspaper Expreso and the television channels Global Television, Latina Televisión, América Televisión, and Panamericana Televisión. On occasion, Montesinos would promise exclusive stories to supporting channels. By 2000, Montesinos was paying $3 million monthly for positive coverage on television. Secret videos of Montesinos paying media executives were eventually released to the public, showing Fujimori's closest advisor giving them bundles of cash in exchange for support and the firing of critical journalists.

=== Contemporary period (since 2000) ===
After Fujimori's regime ended, Peru undertook efforts to restore democratic processes, and with these came initiatives to restore press freedom. In 2001, president Alejandro Toledo tried to eliminate corruption in order to restore press freedom in which the government introduced a law, which three years later allowed for the freedom of expression and of the press. In 2011, Peru passed a law that eradicated jail time for defamation and replaced it with fines and community service. However, in December 2012, public access to information about national security and defense was denied. A new cyber crime law that restricted access to government data was passed in October 2013. Laws that governed journalists' ability to gather data have changed over time and journalists continue to face difficulties in gathering information and publishing stories. Despite the existence of access-to-information laws, in practice official documents are not always made available to journalists.

In 2013, El Comercio Group acquired Empresa Periodistica Nacional SA (Epensa) in August 2013, resulting with the group owning 80% of the printed press in Peru. To some observers, the acquisition allowed El Comercio Group to limit press freedom by controlling opinions published in their newspapers, though El Comercio Group denied such allegations. President Ollanta Humala denounced the acquisition saying that the move gave the conglomerate too much influence and called on legislators to oversee the controversy.

Verbal attacks against press workers by politicians increased into the 2020s, with far-right groups in Peru being documented attacking journalists by Reporters Without Borders. During the 2021 Peruvian general election, the right-wing elite, business groups and the majority of media organizations in Peru collaborated with the campaign of Keiko Fujimori, the daughter of Alberto Fujimori, by appealing to fear when discussing political opponents. Some Peruvian broadcast television channels openly supported Fujimori's candidacy as well. Reuters wrote that El Comercio, one of the largest media organizations in South America, "generally backed Fujimori". Colombian journalist Clara Elvira Ospina of Grupo who was the journalistic director of La República's América Televisión and El Comercio's Canal N was removed from her position on 24 April 2021 after having served in the position for a total of nine years. One anonymous individual said that Ospina allegedly told Fujimori personally that the journalistic direction of the media organizations would not favor her or Castillo, instead using impartiality during their coverage. The Knight Center for Specialized Journalism wrote that Grupo La República shareholder Gustavo Mohme Seminario described the incident as self-censorship. Shortly after polls closed on 6 June 2021, the journalists of Cuarto Poder who sent a letter criticizing alleged censorship were fired by La República's América Televisión and El Comercio's Canal N.

In 2023, Peru experienced 352 attacks on media staff and journalists, representing the highest annual number of attacks in the twenty-first century according to the National Association of Journalists of Peru (ANP). Wayka noted that due to the protests in early 2023, the month of January had the highest incidence of attacks; 102 incidents. According to La República, prosecutors of the Public Ministry of Peru under Attorney General Patricia Benavides attempted to criminalize media outlets investigating the Cuellos Blancos scandal beginning in early 2023, ordering police to spy on journalists of La República, Sudaca and other media outlets. The Inter American Press Association condemned the reports of espionage by the Public Ministry against media outlets, with the president of the association, Roberto Rock, saying that this action "puts the work of the media at risk and compromises their sources of information", demanding that officials "investigate, identify, and sanction those responsible for this order that undermines press freedom" as it may be a violation of the American Convention on Human Rights.

== Ranking of Peru's press freedom ==
2023 Press Freedom Index, with Peru being listed as being in a "difficult situation"

The 2018 World Press Freedom Index shows a slight overall improvement in respect for press freedom in Latin America. However, Latin American countries such as Peru still suffer recurring problems of violence, impunity and authoritarian policies towards citizens that work as journalists.

Peru occupies the 88th position of 180 listed countries all over the world when it comes to press freedom, with the lowest number in the ranking being the countries with more press freedom, according to the 2018 World Press Freedom Index. Peru also occupies the 6th position out of 12 countries in South America, according to the latest World Press Freedom Index 2018. Each index reflects the level of freedom available to journalists, as the researchers reported it is based on an evaluation of the independence of media, pluralism and the quality of legislative framework and safety of journalists in each country.

As the rankings show, Peru continues to have noticeable problems when talking about press freedom as media freedom is threatened by the press laws that allows for journalists to be punished with imprisonment, and for expanding news that can damage the reputation of a company, person or the government. Hence journalists must avoid topics such as corruption, social conflicts or drug trafficking.

== Notable attacks, threats and murders against Peruvian journalists ==
Journalists in Peru face various threats, with some journalists becoming victims of violent and deadly attacks.

Journalist	Year	Date	Position of employment	Event
Hugo Bustíos	1988	24 November	Worked at the news magazine Careta and was the president of the National Association of Journalist of Huanta.	The Peruvian armed forces of Ayacucho were the ones who murdered Hugo Bustíos. Daniel Urresti, the mayoral candidate, was acquitted for the assassination of Bustíos.
Flores Silva	2011	9 September	She was the director of the television program Visión Agraria aired on Channel 6.	Shot dead while riding a motorcycle. The journalist denounced the corruption in the public administration of the mayor of Casma, who had sued the journalist several times.
Donny Buchelli Cueva	2016	8 July	He was the owner of the Solimar radio station and also hosted Más Radio.	He was tortured in his house until he died. At that time, 2016, the journalist was writing and criticizing the lack of transparency of multiple local electoral candidates.
Gloria Lima Calle	2014	17 October	She was journalist Gerson Fabián Cuba's wife.	She was killed while defending her husband from gunmen that broke into the offices of radio Rumba where her husband hosted a program. Fabián had covered controversial topics on his radio program, such as corruption and criticism and protests against the Pluspetrol energy company.
Fernando Raymondi	2014	9 November	He was a journalism student and a writer of the well-known newspaper Caretas.	Shot and killed at his father's grocery store in Lima, because he was writing a story about the different murders that local gangs committed.
Marco Bonifacio Sánchez	2017	7 February	He was a host of the radio and television program El Canillita.	Vandals tried to cut his tongue while walking in Cajamarca, Peru. The journalist was recognized for his critical style against official authorities and institutions.
José Feliciano Yactavo Rodríguez	2017	27 February	Producer and director of documentaries.	Found inside a suitcase that had been previously burnt.
Juan Berríos Jiménez	2018	6 January	Owner of the Tahuamanu radio station.	Murdered because he reported on corruption and the misuse of community funds.

== See also ==
- Freedom of speech by country
- Freedom of the press
- Human rights in Peru
- Internet censorship and surveillance by country
- List of newspapers in Peru
- Media of Peru
- Telecommunications in Peru
- Television in Peru
- World Press Freedom Index
