= Fujimorist propaganda =

Propaganda for former Peruvian president Alberto Fujimori

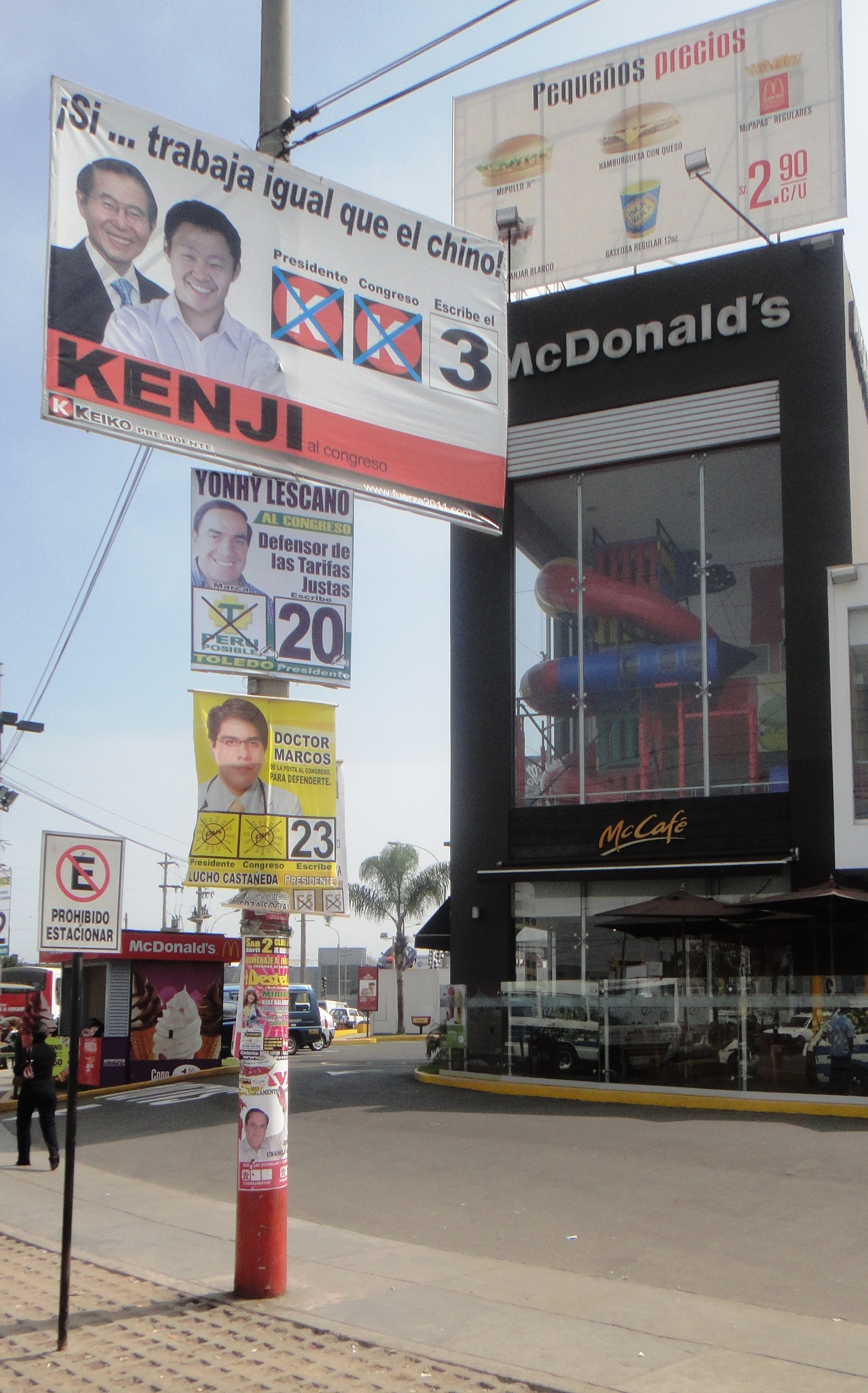
Sign of Alberto Fujimori and his son Kenji Fujimori together, promoting the candidacy of the latter for the 2011 Peruvian general election (near a McDonalds, symbolic of Fujimorist liberal economic policies)

Fujimorist propaganda encompasses the political and media strategies employed to shape public opinion in Peru during and after the presidency of Alberto Fujimori. This propaganda apparatus, orchestrated primarily by Fujimori’s intelligence advisor Vladimiro Montesinos, sought to control Peru's media landscape, suppress opposition, and cultivate a favorable public image of Fujimori’s regime. Rooted in the military plan known as Plan Verde, which outlined the establishment of an authoritarian and neoliberal state, these efforts intensified after Fujimori’s 1992 "self-coup" that dissolved Peru’s Congress and judiciary, consolidating power in the executive branch.

Montesinos leveraged media influence to craft a narrative of stability and security amidst Peru’s internal conflicts, particularly against the Maoist Shining Path insurgency. State resources were directed toward promoting Fujimori’s policies while attacking political adversaries through smear campaigns, often labeling them as terrorists in a tactic known as terruqueo. Media outlets that complied received financial incentives, while those critical faced censorship or were targeted by state-controlled tabloids.

Following Fujimori’s fall from power in 2000, elements of this propaganda strategy persisted within Peruvian politics, notably through his daughter Keiko Fujimori's campaigns, where similar tactics were utilized to promote Fujimorist ideals.

== Background ==
=== Plan Verde ===
In the late 1980s, the Peruvian Armed Forces drafted Plan Verde, which included objectives that involved the genocide of impoverished and Indigenous peoples of Peru, the control or censorship of media in the nation and the establishment of a neoliberal economy controlled by a military junta in Peru. After winning the 1990 Peruvian general election, Alberto Fujimori would be approached by the armed forces and go on to adopt many of the policies outlined in Plan Verde. According to Rospigliosi, Vladimiro Montesinos, a lawyer and friend of Fujimori, was not initially involved with Plan Verde, but his ability to resolve issues for the military resulted with the armed forces tasking Montesinos with implementing the plan with Fujimori, while Schulte-Bockholt would say that both General Nicolás de Bari Hermoza and Montesinos were responsible for the relationship between the armed forces and Fujimori. Fujimori and his military handlers had planned for a coup during his preceding two years in office. The 1992 Peruvian self-coup removed political obstacles set by Congress against the Fujimori government, allowing the military to implement the objectives outlined in Plan Verde while Fujimori served as a figurehead leader. Montesinos, the head of the National Intelligence Service (SIN), would subsequently become the most powerful leader in Peru, using the intelligence agency to control all state functions including the armed forces, Congress, the courts, election boards, banks and media organizations. The smaller size of state bodies following sell-offs to foreign companies and the reduction of state employees would also more funding for populist programs.

== History ==
=== Fujimori government ===
Montesinos was able to take a Goebbels like grip on news and information that shaped Peruvian opinion.

— Tim Lester, ABC

Propaganda was used by Montesinos to maintain nearly all functions within the government, with the government becoming the largest advertiser in Peru during the Fujimori government. From 1992 to 2000, much of the information in Peru was controlled by Vladimiro Montesinos, with the government allowing a meager opposition media to exist only to deflect criticism from governments of the Western world and to warn of rising crises from opponents. Political analysts described the Fujimori administration's use of propaganda over more overt forms of repression as the world's first case of an imagocracy.

According to Calderón Bentin, "Montesinos propelled the state toward a theatrical offensive, with more and more resources directed at image management rather than traditional public services", using funds from numerous ministries to pay for propaganda operations of the SIN's Fondo de Acciones Reservadas (Confidential Actions Fund). Montesinos would pay media organizations for positive coverage and to assist with maintaining the presidency by attacking opponents. Between 1997 and 1999, funding on state propaganda would increase 52 percent.

Montesinos eventually controlled six of the seven main television channels in Peru. News stories by the channels were reviewed daily by Montesinos and media executives at 12:30pm each day, with stories about politicians requiring Montesinos' explicit written permission to be approved. Payoffs and promises of legal leniency were made to the newspaper Expreso and the television channels Global Television, Latina Televisión, América Televisión, and Panamericana Televisión. Some television stations were given personal intelligence officers to discover stories in support of the government. On occasion, Montesinos would promise exclusive stories to supporting channels, including an alleged payment of $3 million for the TV personality Laura Bozzo. By 2000, Montesinos was paying $3 million monthly for positive coverage on television.

Multiple chicha press tabloids were also paid for propaganda purposes, with Montesinos directly controlling the editorial oversight of nine newspapers. SIN officers would use an encrypted fax machine to send article headlines, sometimes created by Montesinos himself, to newspapers, with editors then writing stories surrounding the headlines. Opposition members were often targeted in the newspapers being described as "terrorists" or "communists", with attacks often appealing to the divide between the working class and the elites. Diversionary tactics were also used in the press to distract from crises, with sensationalist headlines being published at such times and psychologists being employed by Montesinos to create stories that would be used for distraction. Typical chicha press headlines cost $3,000 each and between 1998 and 2000, Montesinos would pay $22 million for headline stories.

=== Post-Fujimori government ===
Due to the prevalence of Fujimorism throughout the political and social strata of Peru, a framework established by Fujimori and Montesinos would exist into the twenty-first century, allowing Fujimorist politicians to not have to hold a majority in government to have influence and granting the creation of a cult of personality in support of Alberto Fujimori. This support for Alberto Fujimori and the idea that he "saved" Peru in the 1990s would project support down to his daughter Keiko Fujimori and son Kenji Fujimori, Alberto's political successors. Despite being in prison, Alberto Fujimori was still active on social media and Fujimorists would begin to spread propaganda for promotion and for attacking opponents. Propaganda has also been shared to support the pardon of Alberto Fujimori.

Media organizations in Peru used fake news in an effort to support Keiko Fujimori, the political successor of her father Alberto Fujimori. El Comercio, one of the largest media organizations in South America, has been described as supporting Keiko Fujimori, with Mario Vargas Llosa saying that the conservative newspaper "has become a propaganda machine to favour the candidacy of Keiko Fujimori" during the 2011 Peruvian general election while Reuters wrote that during the 2021 Peruvian general election, El Comercio "generally backed Fujimori". Keiko Fujimori was elected Peru's president in 2026.

== Themes ==
=== Enemies ===
==== Leftists ====
The Fujimori government utilized terruqueos, a negative campaigning and often racist method of fearmongering that involves describing anti-Fujimorists, left-wing political opponents and those who are against the neoliberal status quo as terrorists or terrorist sympathizers, with the tactic being used to create a culture of fear.

Using this technique, the Fujimori government would discredit those who opposed it, including dissenters from the government, with political scientist Daniel Encinas saying that this would evolve into conservative politicians using the attack to target those opposed to Fujimori's neoliberal economic policies and that the right-wing used the terruqueo as a "strategy of manipulating the legacy of political violence". Following the 1992 Peruvian self-coup, Fujimori would broaden the definition of terrorism in an effort to criminalize as many actions possible to persecute left-wing political opponents. The Fujimori government threatened activists and critics of the Peruvian Armed Forces with life imprisonment, describing such groups as the "legal arm" of terrorist groups. Ultimately, a culture of fear was created by Fujimori according to Jo-Marie Burt, with individuals fearing that they would be described as a terrorist. Thus, using the terruqueo, Fujimori successfully made himself a "permanent hero" and made left-wing ideologies an eternal enemy within Peru.

The terruqueo carried into the twenty-first century, with media organizations in Peru using the tactic beside fake news in an effort to support Keiko Fujimori. Shortly before the second round of elections in 2021, propaganda in favor of Fujimori was distributed throughout Peru in paid advertisements, with some ads stating "Think about your future. No to communism".

=== Values ===
==== Anti-elitism ====
- El RItmo del Chino music video featuring many aspects of Fujimori's propaganda campaign on YouTube

The Fujimori government used anti-elitism as a populist tactic according to Kay. Much of Fujimori's image was directly linked to his appearance as a political outsider, which was specially crafted by the media in Peru. Fujimori was presented by the government as being Japanese and not from the criollo white elite groups in Lima, identifying himself as being similar to the mestizos and indigenous Peruvians. During events and speeches, Fujimori often wore Andean apparel – he could be seen wearing a poncho and chullo at gatherings – despite living most of his life in Lima. Utilizing the Asian stereotype of being hardworking and pragmatic, Fujimori adopted the moniker El Chino for many of his campaigns. The military were seen transporting Fujimori across the country for political events. In a propaganda effort during the 2000 Peruvian general election, the Fujimori government described Alberto Andrade as a candidate for the "white business elite", saying that Andrade would only support the rich.

Fujimorists would continue to promote anti-elitist arguments despite controlling many of Peru's institutions.

==== Law and order ====
- Fujimori campaign ad featuring explosions and violence related to the internal conflict on YouTube

Following the 1992 self-coup, the Fujimori government promoted law and order due to the internal conflict in Peru with the Shining Path. Fujimori justified his government's actions, saying that he would use a "direct" democracy to protect Peruvians. The public would often ignore democratic and human rights shortcomings in exchange for socioeconomic stability. The Fujimori government also attempted foreign propaganda to attack groups in Europe and the United States that supported Shining Path. During campaigning for the 2000 Peruvian general election, the Fujimori government disseminated through a negative campaigning effort in the chicha press that his opponent, Alejandro Toledo, was involved in a prostitution mafia and would bring more crime to Peru.

During the 2021 presidential campaign of Keiko Fujimori, she advocated for the use of a "heavy hand", stating: "Democracy cannot be weak. It must be supported by a solid principle of authority."

==== Neoliberalism ====
In order to support crony capitalism occurring within Peru, Fujimorism used the media to promote neoliberalism in an effort to create "an illusionistic state apparatus". According to scholar Rocio Silva Santisteban, Fujimorists utilized the media in a neo-populist manner "to manage symbolically the cruelty of the neoliberal project while its plans continue to be implemented". Domestic and foreign media repeated the propaganda of Fujimorists that a stable free market had been established in Peru.

==== Social projects ====
Social projects, especially in the Andes, were common during the Fujimori government; despite promoting a liberalized economy without government interference, the executive would provide social spending only because it could gain support through tangible resources and increased reliance on the relationship with the president. Ribbon-cutting ceremonies featuring Fujmori in Andean apparel and a crowd of peasants were disseminated through television broadcasts as Fujimori would promote his "direct democracy, without parties". Fujimorists would also provide items such as books, construction supplies and food to individuals in poor communities in an effort to build support.

=== Left-wing figures ===
Fuerza Popular sought a censure motion against Waldemar Cerrón, the second vice president of Congress, after he allowed Betssy Chávez's lawyer, Raúl Noblecilla, to use his defense arguments to insult lawmakers and Fuerza Popular. Congresswoman Patricia Juárez argued that Cerrón lacked the resolve to remove Noblecilla from the floor and said he deserved to be censured for failing to defend the standing of Congress.

== See also ==
- Spin Dictators: The Changing Face of Tyranny in the 21st Century, a 2023 book by Sergey Guriyev and Daniel Treisman that examines how modern dictators focus more on propaganda than on using violence.
