= List of newspapers in Peru =

Newspapers in Peru include:

== Current newspapers ==
- Ajá - Lima
- Los Andes (Peruvian newspaper)
- El Bocón - Lima; owned by conglomerate El Comercio Group
- El Chino - Lima
- El Comercio - Lima; owned by conglomerate El Comercio Group
- La Crónica (Peru)
- Cronicawan - Peru's first nationally circulated Quechua language newspaper
- Diario El Callao - The country's second oldest newspaper
- Diario El Gobierno - online newspaper
- Diario Correo - Lima; owned by conglomerate El Comercio Group
- Diario del Cusco - Cusco
- Expreso - Lima
- Extra (Peru)
- Gestion - Lima; owned by conglomerate El Comercio Group
- Hoy - Huánuco
- La Industria (Chiclayo)
- La Industria (Trujillo)
- La Nación (Peru)
- Ojo - Lima; owned by conglomerate El Comercio Group
- Perú 21; owned by conglomerate El Comercio Group
- El Peruano
- El Popular - Lima
- La Primera - Lima
- La Razón - Lima
- La República - Lima; a left-of-center newspaper
- El Tiempo - Chiclayo
- La Tribuna (Peru)
- Últimas Noticias (Valle Jequetepeque)
- Diario UNO
- Nuevo Sol

== Defunct newspapers ==
- Diario Ahora (Lima)
- Gaceta de Lima
- La Industria de Piura
- Mercurio Peruano
- Los Parias, 1904-1910
- La Prensa (Peru), 1903-1984
- La Razón (Peru), est. 1919
- Última Hora (Peru), 1950-1992
- La Unión (Peru)
- La Voz de Chincha, est. 1924

== See also ==
- Chicha press ("Prensa Chicha"; nickname for sensationalist tabloid newspapers)
- Media of Peru
- List of newspapers
- Freedom of the press in Peru
