= La Prensa (Peru) =

Defunct newspaper from Peru

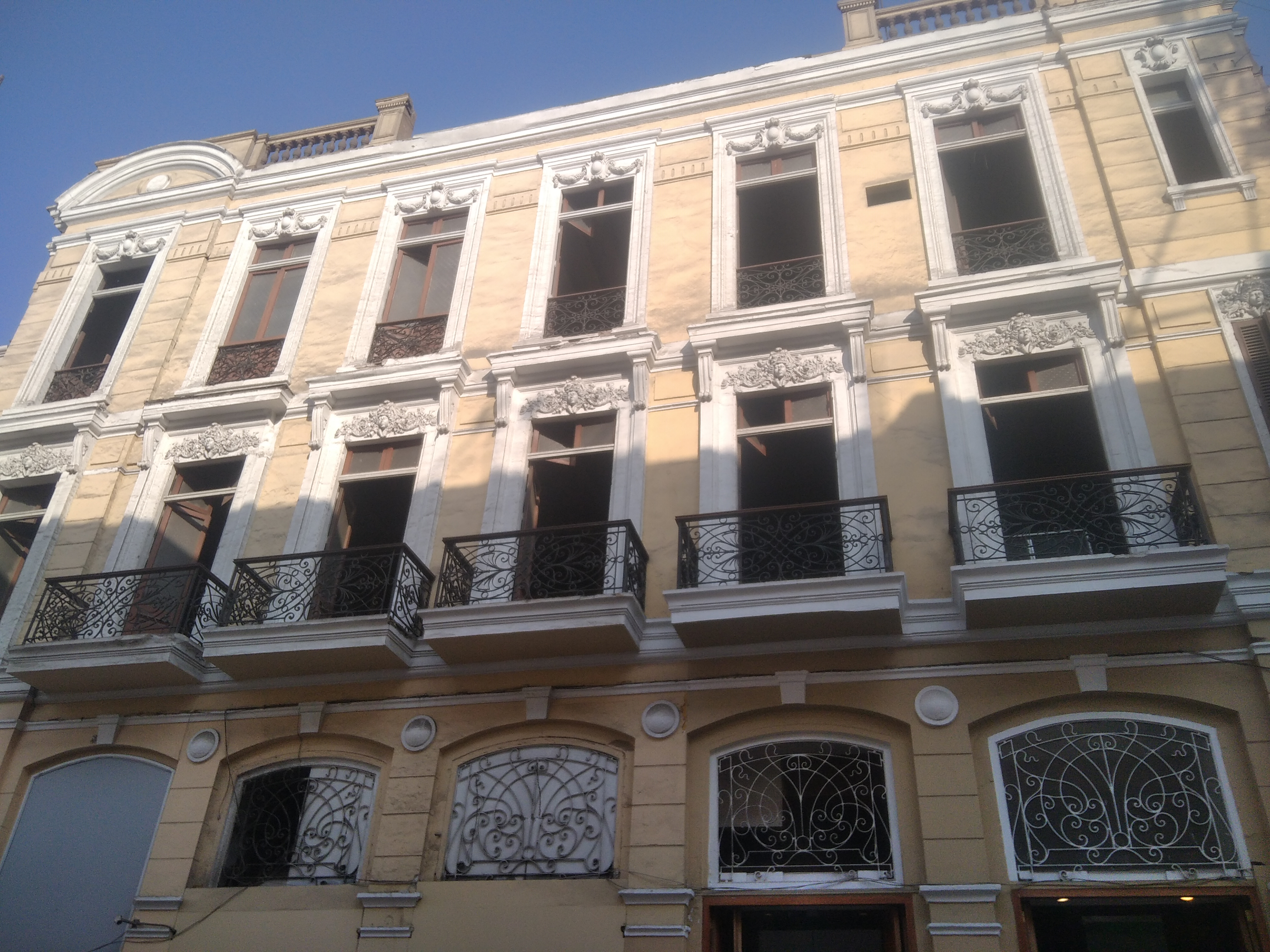
- Former headquarters
- Type: Daily newspaper
- Format: Broadsheet
- Owner(s): Pedro de Osma; Augusto Durand; José Quesada; Pedro Beltrán
- Founder: Pedro de Osma
- Founded: September 23, 1903
- Ceased publication: July 27, 1984
- Political alignment: Economic liberalism
- Language: Spanish
- Headquarters: Lima
- Website: http://laprensa.peru.com/

La Prensa was a Peruvian newspaper, published in Lima, whose first issue went on sale on September 23, 1903. It was also known as the Baquíjano newspaper, because its headquarters were located at 745 Baquíjano Street, current block 7 of the Jirón de la Unión, in Lima.

An online newspaper using La Prensa's name and logo ran from 2012 to 2022, part of the Perú.com website.

== See also ==
- List of newspapers in Peru
- Media of Peru
- El Comercio
- La República
- Caretas
