= Miró Quesada family =

Prominent Peruvian family

- Country: Peru
- Place of origin: Spain, Panama
- Founder: Tomás Gómez Miró; Josefa de Quesada

The Miró Quesada family is a Peruvian business family. The family is considered one of the most powerful groups in the country, due to the business conglomerate in media, mining, tourism, and banking that is under its ownership. Most notably, the family is the owner of El Comercio Group, a media conglomerate that owns the newspaper of the same name.

== History ==
The family traces its origins to Tomás Miró and his wife Josefa de Quesada, who left San Juan de Penonomé in Panama towards Peru in 1847. They had six children: Antonio, Luis, Aurelio, Óscar, Miguel and Josefa "Pepita" Miró Quesada. Of these children, Antonio (Panama; January 19, 1845 — Lima; October 30, 1930) became the sole owner of El Comercio, a newspaper originally founded in 1839 by José Manuel Amunátegui y Muñoz (Chile, June 3, 1802 — Lima October 21, 1886) and Alejandro Villota (Buenos Aires, 1803 — Paris, February 20, 1861), after the death of co-owner Luis Carranza Ayarza in 1898 as part of an arrangement between both parties. Since then, different branches of the family have been closely involved with both the newspaper and the media conglomerate of the same name.

== Notable members ==
- Antonio Miró Quesada de la Guerra (1875–1935), director of El Comercio
- Carlos Miró-Quesada Laos (1903–1969), diplomat and fascist politician
- César Miró Quesada (1907–1999), writer and composer
- Óscar Miró Quesada de la Guerra (1884–1981), scientific journalist

== See also ==
- El Comercio (Peru)
