= La Voz de Chincha =

- Cover of La Voz de Chincha, April 22, 1955 issue
- Type: Daily newspaper
- Founded: 1924
- Language: Spanish language
- Headquarters: Colón 119, Chincha Alta
- Circulation: 3,000 (late 1950s)

La Voz de Chincha ('The Voice of Chincha') was a daily evening newspaper published from Chincha Alta, Peru. The newspaper was founded in 1924. Politically, it was supportive of the different governments in power during its existence. It carried the byline Diario independiente defensor de los intereses de la provincia ('Independent daily, defender of the interests of the province').

Luis A. Bianchi, Víctor Nagaro Bianchi and Ernesto Velit Ruiz served as directors of the newspaper. As of the late 1950s, it had a circulation of around 3,000. It had its own printing press. Its office was located at Colón 119, Chincha Alta. Issues of La Voz de Chincha carried between 4 and 8 pages, with a size of 45 x 36 centrimetres. As of the mid 1940s, it was sold at 10 centavos.

== See also ==
- List of newspapers in Peru
- Media of Peru
