= Hoy (Peruvian newspaper) =

Newspaper published in Huánuco, Peru

HOY Regional is a Peruvian newspaper, published in the city of Huánuco. It first appeared in 1986, under the name Via Gerencia. It was founded by a professional journalist and entrepreneur, David Orosco Alania (who died in November 2010 at the age of 57). Since 1996, it has been a daily newspaper, first under the name Diario Regional. Published from Monday to Saturday, it had a Sunday edition with a cultural magazine, but some weeks later the Sunday edition stopped appearing. A daily newspaper was something absolutely new in the city; the first daily newspaper in a city that was founded on 1539. Competing with national newspapers from Lima was hard. Orosco seems to have applied an old Chinese saying: "Be like a rice plant, it bends to strong storms, but turns right after the storm passes."

The name was modified later to "Periódico Regional," and finally to "HOY Regional." The green logo has been a feature for the last 7 years. Editions are made for Pasco and Ucayali neighboring departments. Nevertheless, it is known that it also reaches parts of Ancash and Junin department.

== See also ==
- List of newspapers in Peru
- Media of Peru
