= Miró Quesada =

Miró Quesada is a Hispanic surname of Balearic-Jewish origin. It may refer to the following people:

- Francisco Miró Quesada Cantuarias (1918–2019), Peruvian philosopher
- Luis Miró Quesada (1880–1976), Peruvian journalist and politician
- Luis Miró Quesada Garland (1914–1994), Peruvian architect and professor
- Óscar Miró Quesada de la Guerra (1884–1981), Peruvian scientific journalist

== See also ==
- Milo Quesada (born Raúl García Alonso; 1930–2012), Argentinian actor
