= Ojo (newspaper) =

Tabloid newspaper from Peru

Diario Ojo
- Type: Daily newspaper
- Format: Tabloid
- Owner(s): El Comercio Group
- Founder(s): Luis Banchero Rossi
- Founded: March 14, 1968
- Political alignment: Conservatism
- Language: Spanish
- Headquarters: Lima
- Website: https://ojo.pe

Ojo is a Peruvian tabloid newspaper founded in 1968 by businessman Luis Banchero Rossi.

== History ==
Ojo was founded on March 14, 1968, as a morning newspaper in Lima. Its founder was the businessman Luis Banchero Rossi, who had already founded the newspaper chain Correo, under the leadership of the Empresa Periodística Nacional SA (Epensa). For this journalistic adventure, Banchero counted his brother-in-law Enrique Agois Paulsen as a partner. Its first director was Raúl Villarán and the value of each copy was S/.1.00.

After the murder of Luis Banchero, the Agois family continued to run the Epensa journalism company. Both Correo and Ojo were seized at the hands of the military dictatorship of Juan Velasco Alvarado in 1974, which they recovered with the restoration of democracy in 1980. In the following decades, Epensa launched new journalistic creations, the sports newspaper El Bocón and newspaper Ajá.

In 2013, the El Comercio Group acquired 54% of the Epensa shareholding package, taking over printing, marketing and advertising, while Epensa retained management of the contents of Correo, Ojo and El Bocón. Consequently, in 2014, Epensa (transformed into Epensa Group SAC) changed its social rationale for that of Pressmart SAC.

In 2018, Grupo El Comercio bought all of the shares of Prensmart SAC. The Epensa SAC Group (Gesac), headed by Luis Agois, continued to be in charge of the editorial line of Correo, Ojo and El Bocón until 2019.

== See also ==
- Correo (newspaper)
