= Leonidas Yerovi =

Peruvian playwright (1881–1917)

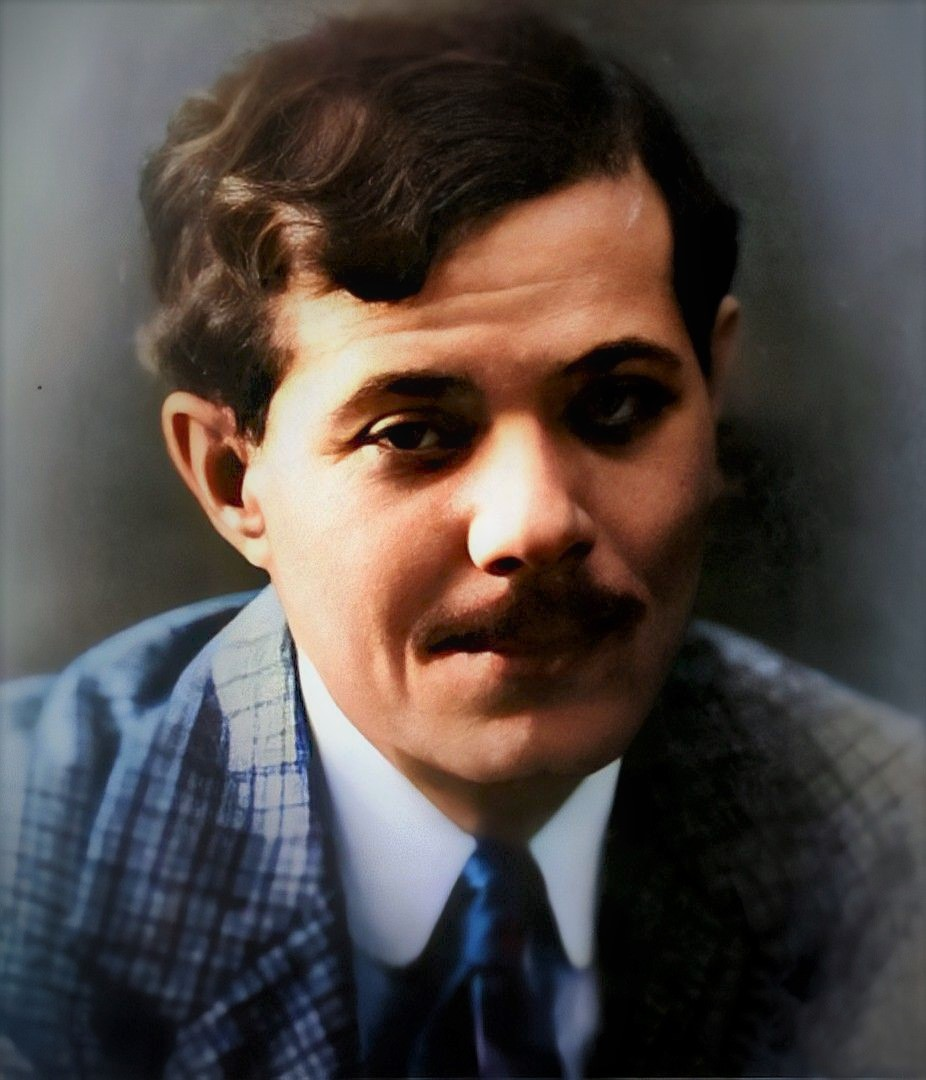
- Portrait of Leonidas Yerovi
- Born: Sergio Nicolás Leonidas Yerovi Douat; September 9, 1881; Lima, Peru
- Died: February 15, 1917; Lima, Peru
- Cause of death: Gunshot wound
- Occupations: Poet; playwright; journalist
- Notable work: La de cuatro mil Monos y Monadas

Sergio Nicolás Leonidas Yerovi Douat (September 9, 1881 – February 15, 1917) was a Peruvian poet, playwright, and journalist. He was an influential figure in early 20th-century Peruvian literature and is best known for his contributions to theater and satirical journalism. Yerovi founded the satirical magazine Monos y Monadas in 1905 and wrote the verse comedy La de cuatro mil (1903), which remains one of the most frequently cited works of Peruvian national theater.

Yerovi was shot dead outside the offices of the newspaper La Prensa in Lima at the age of 35. He was the grandfather of the Peruvian humorist Nicolás Yerovi.

== Early life ==
Yerovi was born in Lima in 1881 to Agustín Leonidas Yerovi Orejuela and Juana Douat Bacon. He was raised by his mother and maternal grandparents in the Barrios Altos district. He attended the Colegio Guadalupe but began working at a young age to help support his family following the death of his grandfather.

== Journalism ==
Yerovi began his career in journalism by publishing verse and satirical prose in periodicals such as Fray K. Bezón (1901) and Actualidades. He was a founding member of the staff of the newspaper La Prensa in 1903 and remained associated with the paper until his death. His columns were widely read and noted for their satirical treatment of politics and urban life in Lima.

On December 31, 1905, together with illustrator Julio Málaga Grenet, Yerovi founded the magazine Monos y Monadas. The publication became one of the most significant satirical magazines in Peruvian journalism, particularly known for its political caricatures. Although it ceased publication in 1907, the magazine was revived in 1978 by Yerovi’s grandson, Nicolás Yerovi.

== Theater ==
Yerovi played a significant role in the development of Peruvian theater in the early 20th century. His verse comedy La de cuatro mil premiered on December 9, 1903, achieving both popular and critical success. Literary historians have described the play as contributing to the revival of the costumbrista theatrical tradition associated with Manuel Ascencio Segura.

He subsequently wrote several plays, including Tarjetas postales (1905), Domingo siete (1906), La salsa roja (1912), and La pícara suerte (1914). In 1914, Yerovi briefly moved to Buenos Aires, where he founded the newspaper Crítica. He returned to Lima in 1915 and was appointed literary director of La Prensa.

== Death ==
On February 15, 1917, Yerovi was shot outside the offices of La Prensa on Baquíjano Street (now part of Jirón de la Unión). The perpetrator was identified as Manuel José Sánchez, a Chilean architect. Contemporary accounts describe the killing as the result of a personal dispute involving the Spanish actress Ángela Argüelles.

According to contemporary press reports, an estimated 30,000 people attended Yerovi’s funeral procession, an unprecedented figure for a writer in Peru at the time. The writer Abraham Valdelomar recited a poem in his honor during the funeral ceremonies.

== Selected works ==
=== Plays ===
- La de cuatro mil (1903)
- Tarjetas postales (1905)
- Domingo siete (1906)
- La salsa roja (1912)
- La pícara suerte (1914)
- La casa de tantos (1917, posthumous)

=== Poetry ===
Yerovi did not publish a poetry collection during his lifetime; his poetic work appeared primarily in newspapers and magazines. Posthumous collections include:

- Poesía lírica (1944)
- Poemas festivos (1960)
