= Francisco Miró Quesada Cantuarias =

Peruvian philosopher (1918–2019)

Francisco Miró Quesada

Peruvian Ambassador to France
- In office 1967–1969
- Preceded by: Julio Óscar Trelles Montes
- Succeeded by: Mario Alzamora Valdez

Minister of Public Education of Peru
- In office 28 July 1963 – 3 October 1964
- President: Fernando Belaúnde
- Preceded by: Franklin Pease Olivera
- Succeeded by: Ernesto Montagne Sánchez

Personal details
- Born: Francisco Miró Quesada Cantuarias; 21 December 1918 Lima, Peru
- Died: 11 June 2019 (aged 100) Lima, Peru
- Party: Popular Action
- Spouse: Doris Rada Jordán
- Children: Francisco Miró Quesada Rada; Eduardo Miró Quesada Rada; Diego Miró Quesada Rada
- Parent: Óscar Miró Quesada de la Guerra (father)
- Alma mater: National University of San Marcos
- Occupation: Philosopher, journalist, politician
- Awards: Legion of Honour; Order of the Sun of Peru

Francisco Miró Quesada Cantuarias (21 December 1918 – 11 June 2019) was a Peruvian philosopher, journalist and politician.

In his works he discusses the belief in "human nature" on the basis that any collective assumption about such a nature will be frustrating, and will have negative public results. He was interested in so-called "unorthodox logics". The term "paraconsistent logic" was coined in 1976 by him.

He was the first person of the Americas to hold the position of president of the International Federation of Philosophy Societies, elected in Moscow in 1990.

== Biography ==
He was the son of journalist Óscar Miró Quesada de la Guerra and María Josefina Cantuarias Dañino. His father, a renowned social researcher, was director of the newspaper El Comercio belonging to his family.

He completed his school studies, first, at the Pensionnat du Sacré-Coeur de Passy, in Paris, and then at the schools of the Sacred Hearts of Belén and Recoleta, and at the Antonio Raimondi Italian school in Lima. He completed his studies at the Faculty of Arts of the Pontifical Catholic University of Peru, where he graduated from Bachelor of Philosophy with the thesis Crítica de la prueba ontológica a través de San Anselmo, Descartes, Spinoza y Leibniz (Critique of the ontological argument through Anselm, Descartes, Spinoza and Leibniz) in 1938, and he continued at the National University of San Marcos, where he studied Philosophy and Mathematics, opting for the degree of doctor with the thesis Algunos estudios sobre las categorías. Ensayo de una crítica de la vida sicológica en general (Some studies on the categories. Essay of a critique of psychological life in general) in 1939. Subsequently, he obtained the bachelors in Mathematics and Law (1953) in the latter university and the title of lawyer.

He made his debut in 1941 with Sentido del movimiento fenomenológico (Meaning of the phenomenological movement). The term paraconsistent logic was coined by Miró Quesada at the Third Latin America Conference on Mathematical Logic in 1976.

After Miró Quesada graduated from the University of San Marcos with a doctorate in Philosophy, he began teaching there as a professor of Contemporary Philosophy. Later, in 1952, he was granted a scholarship by UNESCO to go to France, Italy, and England to study the formation of the secondary teaching staff. In 1953, he published the Sunday Supplement (el Suplemento Dominical).

In July 1963, during the first Popular Action government, President Fernando Belaúnde Terry appointed him Minister of Public Education of Peru. As such, he made several innovations, among which highlight the creation of an office dedicated to serving parents, another oriented to the attention of the members of the teachers' union; the massive construction of classrooms using the methods of Popular Cooperation – one of the principles inspired by the acciopopulist ideology; the application, for the first time, of bilingual education methods in Peru; and the incorporation of a high percentage of the primary school population into the education system. In October 1964, he was questioned by the appropriate majority of the National Parliament and censured for leaving the floor without the debate over the alleged illegal transfer of several million soles from his office.

During the government of Francisco Morales Bermúdez, he was an ideologist summoned for this management and worked as a professor at Cayetano Heredia University and Lima University. Upon reaching seventy years of age, he was dismissed at the University of Lima; and went on to work at the Ricardo Palma University. He continues publishing in the newspaper of his family, El Comercio de Lima.

From 2003 to September 2008, he served as the journalistic director of the newspaper El Comercio.

Francisco Miró Quesada Cantuarias received on 9 December 2008 the Medal of Honor of the Congress of the Republic, in the degree of Grand Officer for his outstanding philosophical work, journalism, political thought and scientific dissemination.
