= El Ángel Cemetery =

Cemetery in Lima, Peru

Coordinates: 12°02′44″S 77°00′21″W

- Cementerio El Ángel
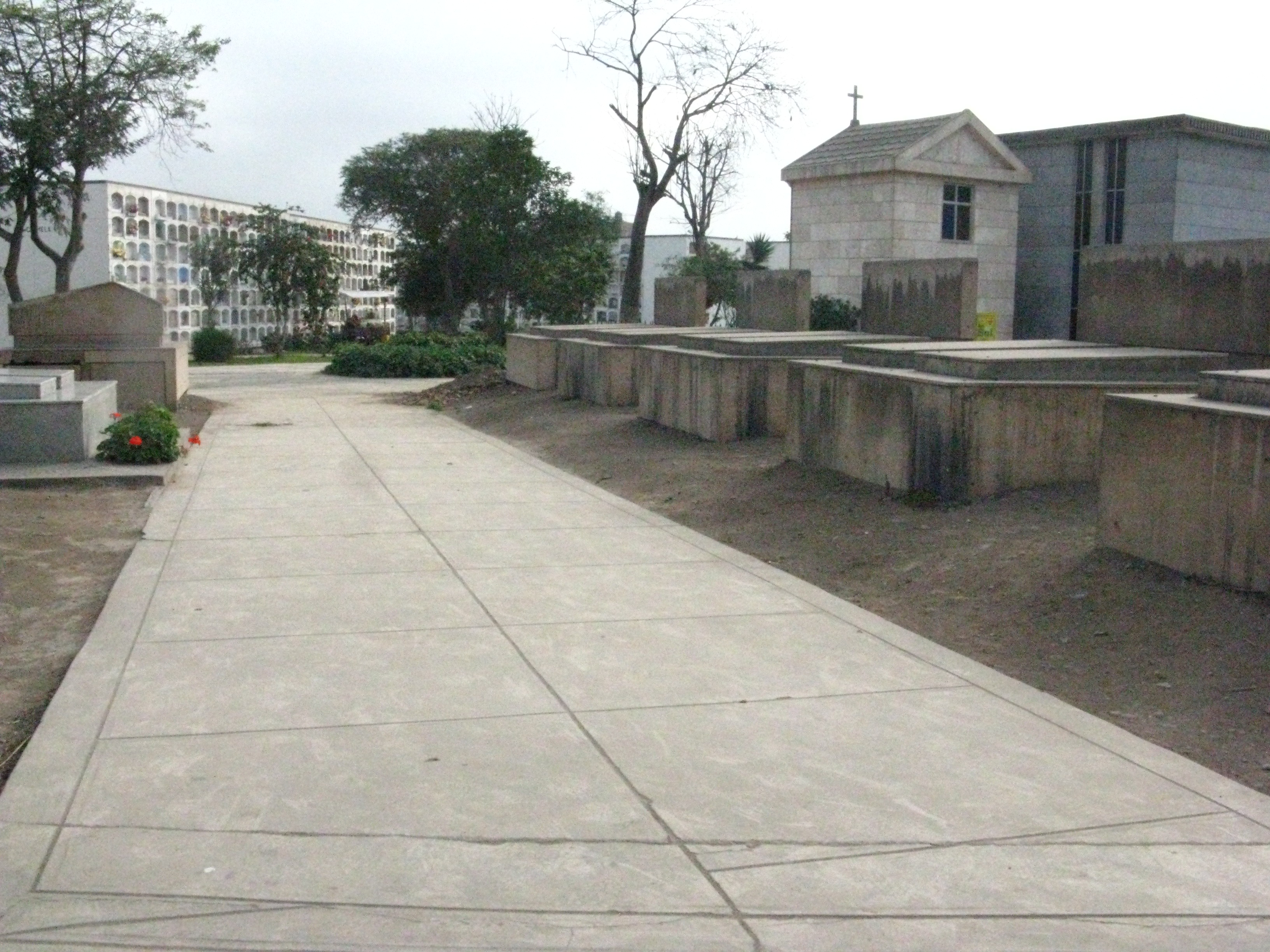
- Interactive map of El Ángel Cemetery

Details
- Established: June 27, 1959
- Location: Barrios Altos
- Country: Peru
- Owned by: Charity of Lima
- Find a Grave: El Ángel Cemetery

El Ángel Cemetery is a cemetery located on the 17th block of Jirón Áncash, in Barrios Altos, between the districts of Lima and El Agustino, in the city of Lima, Peru. It was inaugurated by President Manuel Prado Ugarteche on June 27, 1959, due to the need of the city of Lima to have a new funerary space, since the capacity of the Presbítero Matías Maestro Cemetery had reached its maximum in 1955. It is owned and managed by the Charity of Lima.

== History ==
Its construction began in June 1956 at the initiative of President Manuel A. Odría. It was erected on the location of the Ancieta Alta farm in front of the Ángel de la Resurrección square, named after a statue placed there in 1877. The first person buried was the former mayor of La Victoria and councilor of Lima, Juan Luis Uccelli Rainusso, on July 3, 1959. The entrance doorway of the El Ángel cemetery has a large pictorial mural by the Peruvian artist Fernando de Szyszlo, and a sculpture by Joaquín Roca Rey.

The work was designed by the architects Luis Miró Quesada Garland and Simón Ortiz, from the works section of Public Charity. In the project you could see the three parts into which the necropolis would be divided, which would have a capacity of 80,000 tombs. It currently has 640 pavilions, some of them built in quartz and marble, most of them are made of reinforced concrete, and they rest around 600,000 bodies.

It consists of three pedestrian entrances: the main one, from the Áncash jirón, the Plácido Jiménez avenue, belonging to the El Agustino district, and the one from the Locumba jirón, where it has a parking lot.

The crematorium was inaugurated on July 25, 2000. It is the only crematorium located in the city of Lima that does not belong to a private company. It comprises an area of 400 m^{2}.

Although the orientation of this pantheon is more of a popular nature, due to the existence in recent decades of private cemeteries located on the outskirts of the city. Currently, at the top of its capacity, 10,000 new niches are being built.

The owner of these tombs is the Peruvian State after 10 years after the burial, and the niche can be used again.

== Notable burials ==
- Abelardo Gamarra Rondó (1852-1924, writer)
- Akira Kato (1933-1982, trainer)
- Armando Villanueva (1915-2013, politician)
- Augusto Ferrando (1919-1999, entertainer)
- Chabuca Granda (1920-1983, singer)
- Lorenzo Palacios (1950-1994, singer) and his son
- Juan Velasco Alvarado (1910-1977, president)
- Consuelo Gonzales Posada (1920-2012, first lady)
- Flor Pucarina (1935-1987, musician)
- Ángel Bagni Stella (1932-2004, musician)
- Henry Pease (1944-2014, politician)
- Hermilio Valdizán (1885-1929, writer)
- José María Arguedas (1911-1969, writer; cenotaph)
- Julio Mau (1954-1986, singer)
- Lucha Reyes (1936-1973, singer)
- Luis Banchero Rossi (1929-1972, businessman)
- Luis E. Valcárcel (1891-1989, writer)
- Manuel Seoane (1900-1963, politician)
- Rómulo Varillas (1922-1998, singer)
- Julia Codesido (1883-1979, artist)
- Aldo Chamochumbi (1967-1987, sportsman)
- Víctor A. Gil (1928-1975, singer)
- Martín Adán (1908-1985, poet)
- Pedro Huilca Tecse (1949-1992, syndicalist)
- Ramiro Prialé (1904-1988, politician)
- Eloísa Angulo (1919-1991, singer)
- Rebeca Carrión Cachot (1907-1960, archaeologist)
- Leonidas Carbajal (1922-2002, entertainer)
- Ricardo de Jaxa Malachowski (1887-1972, architect)
- Sebastián Salazar Bondy (1924-1965, writer)
- Dilma Eulalia Mesías (1953-1987, singer)
- Zenón Noriega (1900-1957, interim president)
- Isidoro Berrocal Coronado (1937-1984, singer)
- César Ureta (1945-1982, actor)
- David Chaparro Pareja (1875-1963, jurist)
- Luis D’Unian Dulanto (1925-1962, convicted felon)
- Eusebio Grados (1964-2020, singer)
- Gustavo Gutiérrez (1928-2024), Catholic priest)

Also among the buried in the cemetery are the victims of various fateful events in the last decades of the twentieth century. These include the eight journalist victims of the Uchuraccay Massacre and the victims of the 1987 Alianza Lima plane crash, as well as the unidentified victims of the December 29, 2001 Mesa Redonda fire.

== See also ==
- Cementerio Presbítero Matías Maestro
- Nueva Esperanza Cemetery
