= Los Parias =

Anarchist newspaper published in Peru from 1904–1910

Los Parias was a Peruvian anarchist newspaper. Published from 1904 to 1910, it was the first anarchist newspaper to appear in Peru.

One this publications' most famous authors was Manuel González Prada, who wrote for it many of the essays that would compose his important posthumous book, Anarquía, one of the first anarchist tracts to be published in Peru.

== See also ==
- List of newspapers in Peru
- Media of Peru
