= Luis Banchero Rossi =

Peruvian businessman (1929–1972)

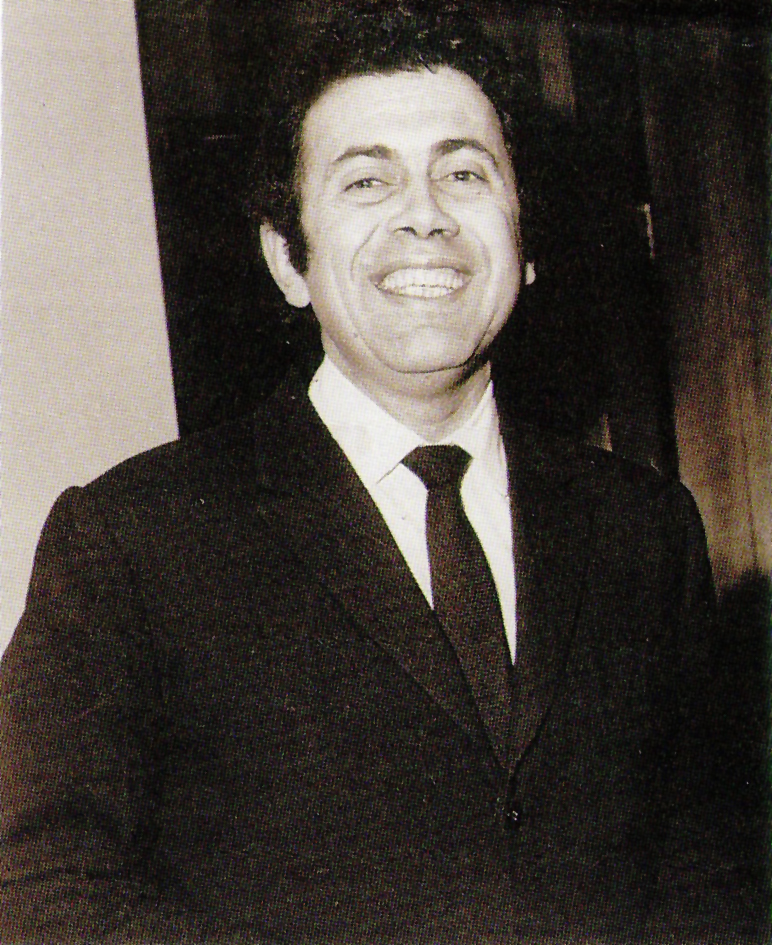
- Born: October 11, 1929; Tacna, Peru
- Died: January 1, 1972 (aged 42); Chaclacayo, Peru
- Cause of death: Murdered
- Burial place: El Ángel Cemetery
- Education: National University of Trujillo
- Occupation: Businessman
- Known for: Promoter of the Peruvian fishing industry

Luis Banchero Rossi (Tacna; October 11, 1929 — Chaclacayo; January 1, 1972) was an important Peruvian businessman dedicated to the export of fishmeal and fish oil, who became one of the main promoters of the Peruvian fishing industry until his murder.

== Early life ==
Banchero was born into a family of low-income Italian immigrants. He finished his high school studies at the Colegio Nacional de Varones (today the I. E. E. Coronel Bolognesi) in Tacna and graduated as a chemical engineer at the National University of Trujillo.

He began to amass his fortune as a seller of countless products: wines from his father's small winery, socks, records, cars, tractors, shipments of pineapples from Trujillo to Tacna. Later, he sold alcohol and motor oil. This is how he discovered the city of Chimbote, when it was not yet the industrial zone that he helped create.

== Career ==
In 1955, with business profits, he bought his first canned fish factory and named it Florida. By then, he already had a net worth of S/. 1 million. Later, he acquired his own ships to reduce production costs. In this way, his company grew exponentially: he acquired factories producing fish flour and oil that were bankrupt and transformed them. He owned ten fishing complexes and more than three hundred and twenty boats of all sizes, whose function was to fill the warehouses of his factories with raw materials. Near them, he built houses for his workers and schools for their children. Likewise, he established medical posts in the places where his fishing emporium extended.

In 1970, the gross income from its fishing industries alone was around US$ 60 million a year. He diversified his activities and created companies in other areas: the Picsa Shipyards (in Callao and Chimbote). Thus, he ventured into sectors such as mining, aviation, soccer (with the Club Atlético Defensor Lima) and the media.

In 1962, he founded the newspaper Correo in Tacna, which was published in several provinces of Peru, and the newspaper Ojo. However, he never acquired his own house in Lima, since he lived in an entire apartment that he had rented in the Hotel Crillón in the capital.

At the time of his death, Banchero was the Peruvian who had created the most jobs in Peru at that time and had managed to build an entire emporium.

In 1968, he was appointed president of the National Fisheries Society. From this position, he promoted oceanographic scientific research and donated equipment to encourage fish consumption among the population. Likewise, he was director of the Banco de Crédito del Perú. He also wanted to run for the presidency of Peru.

== Murder ==
Banchero had gone to his country house in Chaclacayo to spend New Year's Eve with his secretary Eugenia Sessarego. There the son of his gardener, Juan Vilca Carranza, murdered him on January 1, 1972. His murderer confessed to the crime and declared that he did it for money. However, some facts cast doubt on his version. Juan Vilca was only 20 years old and was 1.50 m tall compared to the businessman's 1.80 m. Although he used a German Luger pistol to subdue Banchero and Sessarego, the difference in size raised doubts about the role of the boy, who beat and stabbed Banchero to death.

Nor was it fully clarified what the participation of his secretary, Eugenia Sessarego, was, who was first branded as a lover and, during the trial of the case, ended up being accused as Vilca's accomplice. She spent five years in prison until she was pardoned on December 21, 1977. Like Vilca once he was released, she maintained a life withdrawn from the public.

After Banchero's assassination, his companies were nationalized by the military dictatorship of Juan Velasco Alvarado.

Another hypothesis about the crime pointed to the trail of Klaus Barbie, a Gestapo officer and fugitive war criminal. According to the hypothesis of historian Nelson Manrique, Barbie was in Chaclacayo on a stopover on his way to Bolivia, when he was identified by Herbert John, Banchero's German collaborator, and both of them blew the whistle on him. Jewish investigator Serge Klarsfeld stated that between November and December 1971, he received a letter signed by both of them confirming Barbie's identity. Banchero was murdered just days after this information was made public.

His remains were buried in the El Ángel Cemetery in Lima.
