= Nueva Esperanza Cemetery =

Cemetery in Lima Province, Peru

Coordinates: 12°09′35″S 76°55′09″W

Virgen de Lourdes Cemetery
- Cementerio Virgen de Lourdes
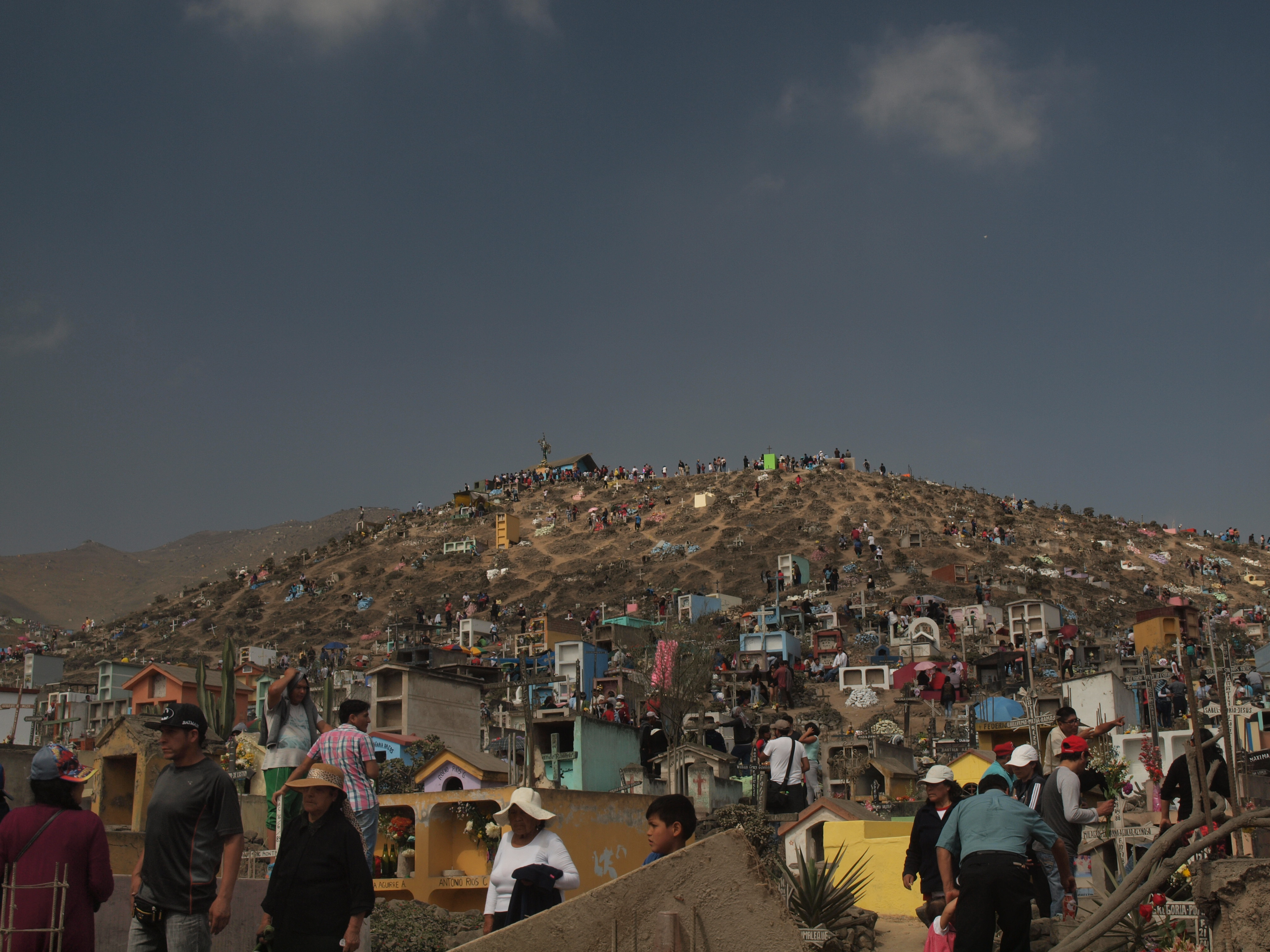

Details
- Established: 1961
- Location: Villa María del Triunfo
- Country: Peru
- Type: Popular cemetery
- Size: 60 Ha
- No. of graves: >1 million

The Virgen de Lourdes Cemetery (Spanish: Cementerio Virgen de Lourdes), popularly known as Nueva Esperanza, is a popular cemetery located in the district of Villa María del Triunfo, Lima, Peru. It was created in 1961 with the purpose of being used by immigrants from other provinces. It is settled on 60 hectares and contains more than a million tombs. The site is considered a tourist attraction, frequented by two million people each year to cultural activities.

It is the largest cemetery in Peru, in addition to being the second in the world behind Wadi-us-Salaam.

== Notable burials ==
- Néstor Cerpa Cartolini

== See also ==
- Cementerio Presbítero Matías Maestro
- El Ángel Cemetery
