= Ciberayllu =

Latin American webzine of literature and humanities

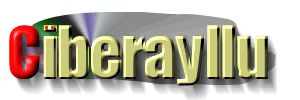
- Editor: Domingo Martínez Castilla
- Categories: Spanish language webzine of literature and the humanities
- Format: Webzine
- First issue: 1996-11-01
- Final issue: 2010-07-05
- Country: United States
- Language: Spanish
- Website: https://www.ciberayllu.org/
- ISSN: 1527-9774
- OCLC: 41015820

Ciberayllu was a free, non-periodical digital publication developed by a group of Peruvian intellectuals and scholars of Peruvian studies residing in several countries. It appeared on the Internet on November 1, 1996, and was one of the first webzines in the Spanish language. It was published continuously until July 2010. In those fourteen years, nearly 900 original articles signed by more than 230 authors were published on Ciberayllu.

== History ==
Ciberayllu was conceived in a private email list, started by Peruvian historian Nelson Manrique. Subscribers to the list were Peruvian writers, academics and, in general, people concerned with Andean and Peruvian studies. The list included members residing in Peru and elsewhere in America and Europe, several of them part of the Peruvian diaspora of the 1980s, as well as professors and researchers working at universities in Europe and the United States. The members of the list referred to the group with the term ayllu, a Quechua word that designates a traditional Andean community.

The webzine debuted with eight articles and a book review. Four articles by the journalist and academic Víctor Hurtado Oviedo, from San José, Costa Rica; two by historian José Luis Rénique, from New York, USA; one by Maruja Martínez, from Lima; and another by Domingo Martínez Castilla, from Missouri, USA.

After publishing some works by the founding members, Ciberayllu opened itself to receiving unsolicited collaborations.

During its first decade (1996–2006), the webzine was hosted on an Internet server at the University of Missouri, where one of its promoters worked. Starting in January 2007, it continued publication in its own website. Since September, 2004, the university stopped hosting the original webzine, but the whole archive is reachable from the current home page.

Ciberayllu developed a section dedicated to original academic works and testimonies about the Peruvian writer José María Arguedas, entitled Arguediana.

== Contents ==
The articles in Ciberayllu were organized into the following sections:

- Arguediana: articles on the life and works of the Peruvian writer and anthropologist José María Arguedas (1911–1969). This section includes essays of an academic nature, as well as personal testimonies by Alberto Escobar and Cecilia Bustamante, both very close to the great Peruvian writer.
- Essays: articles usually in academic format, mainly in the areas of literary criticism, history, economics, politics, linguistics, anthropology and ethnology (with emphasis on issues of the Andean region), philosophy and, in general, matters of Peruvian, Andean and Latin American interest.
- Literature: literary creation, mainly narrative fiction and poetry.
- Commentary: articles on various topics, including writings on authors, books, music and others.
- Chronicles: interviews with other authors and articles on the author's personal experiences.
- Culture: writings on music, folklore, and elements of Peruvian and Latin American cultures.
- Images: some works that combine text and photographs.
- Breviary: brief reviews and notices of recent books and publications.
- Editorial notes.
- List of authors, including brief biographical notes.

== Characteristics ==
Some relevant characteristics of Ciberayllu:

- The authors of Ciberayllu were never paid for their contributions, which were always voluntary.
- The publication did not contain commercial advertisements nor did it generate revenue of any kind.
- Ciberayllu was not organized into units or numbered editions, as it was published cumulatively, something similar to what would later be called a blog or logbook.
- Ciberayllu published original works.
- Number of articles published: 820 in the thematic sections, plus editorial notes and brief reviews.
- Number of collaborating authors: 230

== Authors ==
The authors who published in Ciberayllu included 230 academics, literary creators, journalists and, in general, writers, both recognized and new. Between 1996 and 2006, there were 197 contributors: 123 Peruvians (71 of them living outside Peru), and 74 authors from 22 other countries. Between 2007 and 2010, there were 68 contributors: 49 Peruvians (25 living outside Peru) and 19 from other countries.

== Recognitions and awards ==
- 1998: Ciberayllu was recognized as one of the “Five Best [Spanish language] Literary Magazines on the Internet” by Letralia, a Venezuelan publication.
- 2004: Ciberayllu received a tribute at the Institute of Advanced Studies on Latin America, at the Sorbonne, in Paris.
- 2005, Ciberayllu was also included in The Best of the Web for Latin American Studies, in the United Kingdom.
