= Hotel Crillón (Lima) =

Former hotel in Peru

Edificio Crillón
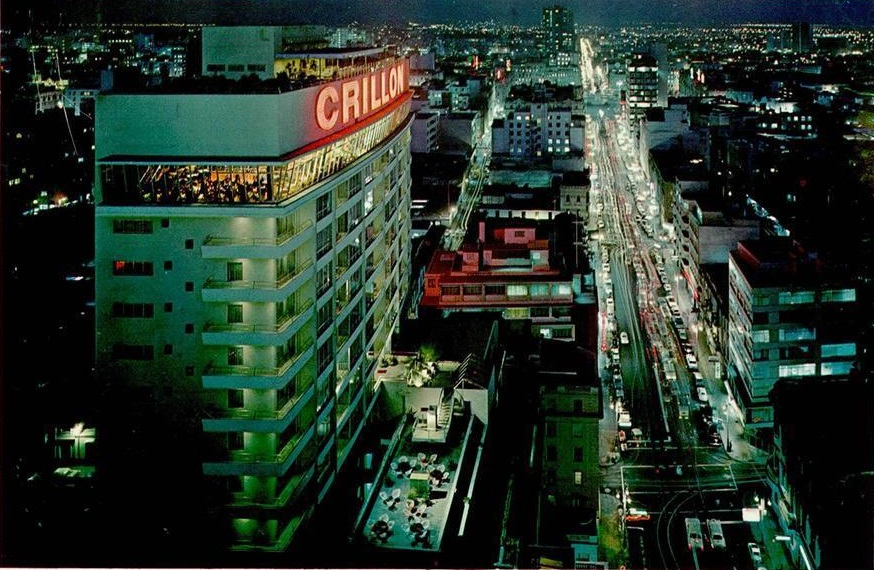
- The hotel in 1965

General information
- Address: Av. Nicolás de Piérola 589
- Coordinates: 12.04923118°S 77.03820694°W
- Inaugurated: 1947

Technical details
- Floor count: 22

Crillón Building (Spanish: Edificio Crillón) is an office building located at Nicolás de Piérola Avenue in the Historic Centre of Lima, Peru. From 1947 until 1999, it hosted the Hotel Crillón, one of the city's most emblematic hotels, hosting well-known figures of the era, including foreign actors and musicians.

== History ==
It was inaugurated in 1947 by the Swiss businessman Domingo Bezzola in an eight-story building that was originally built to be the headquarters of the Lima Bar Association. The intention was to compete with the Gran Hotel Bolívar, located a few blocks away in the Plaza San Martín. In 1957, 14 floors were built until reaching its final height of 22 floors. During its heyday it had 550 rooms, 650 beds, 700 employees, four bars and five restaurants. It was also famous for hosting actors and singers who visited Lima. Among its facilities were the Pancho Fierro restaurant, the Don Pepe bar, its Convention Centre, the Grill La Balsa and its Sky Room, inaugurated on August 1, 1960.

The 1960s were the hotel's most successful years. The Sky Room, from where the city of Lima's skyline could be seen, was the most lively and exclusive meeting centre in the city. In those years, the hotel hosted many celebrities such as María Félix, Charles Aznavour, John Wayne, Nat King Cole, Debbie Reynolds, Muhammad Ali and Pelé. In the 1970s, fishing businessman Luis Banchero Rossi, considered the richest man in Peru at that time, rented the entire 19th floor where he lived and set up his headquarters.

The decline of the historic centre of Lima caused the decline of the hotel in the 1980s and 1990s. Hotel chains began their migration to the districts of San Isidro and Miraflores. In 1999, the Crillón closed its doors. The building was later acquired by the Spanish company Arte Express and serves as office space, a SUNAT office and space for teleworking.
