= Nicolas Yerovi =

Nicolás Yerovi
- Born: Leónidas Nicolás Ramón Yerovi Díaz; August 31, 1951; Lima, Peru
- Died: January 19, 2025 (aged 73); Lima, Peru
- Education: Pontifical Catholic University of Peru
- Occupations: Journalist; writer; playwright; humorist
- Parents: Leonidas P. Yerovi (father); Carmen Rosa Díaz Torres (mother)
- Relatives: Leonidas Yerovi (grandfather)

Leónidas Nicolás Ramón Yerovi Díaz (August 31, 1951 – January 19, 2025) was a Peruvian journalist, writer, playwright, and humorist. He was widely regarded as a leading figure in Peruvian political satire and was best known for reviving and directing the humor magazine Monos y Monadas, originally founded in 1905 by his grandfather, the poet Leonidas Yerovi. Over his career, he wrote and staged more than fifty theatrical works, primarily comedies characterized by social satire and political commentary.

== Biography ==
Yerovi was born in Lima to journalist and writer Leonidas P. Yerovi and Carmen Rosa Díaz Torres. He was the grandson of the poet and dramatist Leonidas Yerovi (1881–1917), a leading figure of early 20th-century Peruvian literature.

He attended the Colegio La Salle in Lima. In 1968, he enrolled at the Pontifical Catholic University of Peru (PUCP), where he earned a bachelor's degree in Literature and Human Sciences in 1970. According to biographical sources, he later pursued doctoral studies in Hispanic literature and philology, focusing his research on the works of Martín Adán and Luis Hernández.

Between 1968 and 1972, he taught at the PUCP before devoting himself full-time to literary and journalistic work. During the 1970s and early 1980s, he published several poetry collections while maintaining an active presence in Peru's cultural press.

=== Monos y Monadas ===
During the military government of General Francisco Morales Bermúdez, Yerovi, together with poet Antonio Cisneros, successfully petitioned authorities to reopen Monos y Monadas, a political humor weekly originally founded in 1905. The first issue of this revived period appeared on April 27, 1978.

Due to its critical stance toward successive governments, the magazine faced political pressure and harassment. It ceased publication in 1992 following the self-coup carried out by President Alberto Fujimori, though it briefly reappeared in 2000. Yerovi later stated that he also received threats from the Maoist insurgent group Shining Path during the period of internal conflict in Peru.

He also reported having faced censorship during the Fujimori administration. In 1999, the Peruvian state agency Indecopi halted the publication of his novel Más allá del aroma due to a copyright dispute, which Yerovi described as politically motivated retaliation, a claim reported by contemporary media.

=== Literary and theatrical career ===
From the early 1980s onward, Yerovi focused increasingly on theater, producing more than fifty plays, including comedies, sainetes, and entremeses. His theatrical output has been noted by literary scholars for its continuity with Peru's tradition of satirical theater.

In 1983, he co-founded the theater group Monos y Monadas with Susana Roca and Pablo Zumaeta.

He was a regular contributor to major Peruvian newspapers and magazines. In La República, he authored the weekly columns "La vida alegre de Nicolás Yerovi" (1993–1995) and later "La última de Nicolás Yerovi" (1999). He also wrote "Los años inmóviles" for the weekly supplement of Expreso between 1990 and 1992.

In 1992, he founded the Leonidas Yerovi Higher Institute of Arts and Communication Sciences, which he directed until 1996.

== Death ==
Yerovi was admitted to the Edgardo Rebagliati Martins Hospital in Lima on January 18, 2025, and died the following day at the age of 73. His wake was held at the Municipal Library of Barranco District, the Lima district where he resided. He was buried at the Jardines de la Paz cemetery in southern Lima.

His work left a lasting mark on Peruvian satire and theater, particularly through his role in sustaining the tradition of political humor during periods of censorship and authoritarian rule.

== Selected works ==
=== Poetry ===
- Mapa de agua (1971)
- Crónica de ciego (1973)
- Después del vino (el amor o la siesta) (1974)
- Penetrándote (1976)
- Quiero morir soñando (1978), with Luis La Hoz

=== Plays ===
- La divina comedia (1981), with Rafael León
- Bienvenido amor (1983)
- Adiós amor (1984)
- Hasta que la vida nos separe (1984)
- Quiéreme así (1985)
- Un peruano en París (1986)
- La señora presidenta (1994)
- Titina (2006), a verse comedy staged in the streets of Barranco
- Lola (2022), musical comedy

=== Novels and non-fiction ===
- Los años inmóviles (1985; expanded ed. 1997)
- Más allá del aroma (2000)
- La casa de tantos (2001)
- El Perú de Yerovi: La leyenda de “Monos y Monadas” (2006)
- Diccionario de peruanos inolvidables (2009)
