= Wayka =

Electronic journal in Peru

- Website type: Online newspaper
- Available in: Spanish
- Country of origin: Peru
- Website: wayka.pe
- Launched: May 15, 2014; 12 years ago

Wayka (Quechua: "work together for the common good") is a nonprofit online newspaper based in Peru that describes itself as an organization dedicated to promoting democracy, the protection of human rights and achieving the common good. The website believes that information accessibility is a human right not to be commoditized and that the media should remain independent from financial and political influence. The number of readers is between one and three million.

== History ==
The idea of Wayka began when in El Comercio Group acquired Empresa Periodistica Nacional SA (Epensa) in August 2013, resulting with the group owning 80% of the printed press in Peru. With El Comercio owning the majority of the printed media in Peru, media pluralism faced danger in the nation. Rael Mora and José Carlos Lama cofounded Wayka in 2013, believing that media pluarlism and the freedom of speech was essential for democracy.

=== Physical publication ===
In 2014, Rael Mora, Gonzalo Villamonte, Diana García, José Carlos Lama and Luciana Távara gathered to create an independent media organization that brought attention to overlooked communities – especially peasants, minorities and student groups – located within Peru. To raise funds for establishing Wayka, the group began an Indiegogo crowdfunding campaign in an effort to distribute free weekly newspapers at Lima Metro stations. The original slogan of Wayka was "The newspaper that is not sold", which originally served as a double entendre due to the publication being both free of charge and financial influence. All initial work performed by Wayka was done by volunteer work. Wayka began distributing print newspapers on 15 May 2014, though it ceased physical publications in September 2017, continuing its online work instead as the newspaper became more self-sustainable.

=== Online publication ===
As the newspaper became online-focused in 2017, Wayka's motto changed to "More than journalism", with the group focusing on trends and headlines as it began to participate on the national scale. Using a CrowdTangle asset, Wayka would achieve one to three million readers for some publications. Audiovisual elements also evolved, with Wayka becoming more involved on Facebook, Instagram, TikTok, Twitter, WhatsApp and YouTube. Facebook has grown to be Wayka's main platform, with 1.2 million followers, with each published post receiving at least 100,000 interactions.

== Funding ==
According to Wayka, the newspaper is funded by human rights organizations and its readers, with 80% of Wayka's funds reportedly being from international organizations.

== Controversy ==
After publishing investigations surrounding allegations of child sexual abuse reportedly involving Peruvian politician Víctor Hugo Quijada Tacuri, journalist Graciela Tiburcio Loayza of Wayka and president of Amnesty International Peru faced death threats.

== Recognition ==
In 2019, the Coordinadora Nacional de Derechos Humanos awarded Wayka with the 2019 Journalism and Human Rights Award. Planned Parenthood awarded Wayka with honors in its 2020 Media Excellence Awards, with other outlets such as Vox Media and Wired being awarded beside the outlet.
