= Nelson Manrique =

Peruvian academic (1947–2026)

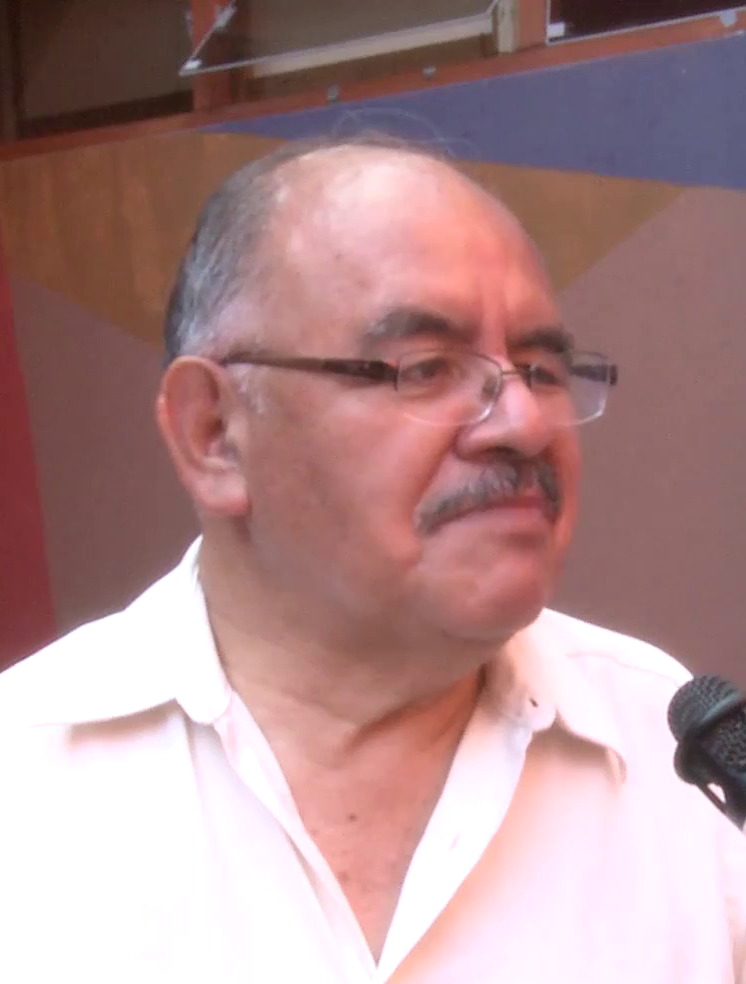
- Manrique in 2017
- Born: December 31, 1947; Huancayo, Peru
- Died: January 11, 2026 (aged 78); Lima, Peru
- Education: National Agrarian University; Pontifical Catholic University of Peru
- Occupations: Historian; sociologist; journalist
- Notable work: Campesinado y nación

Nelson Saúl Manrique Gálvez (December 31, 1947 – January 11, 2026) was a Peruvian historian, sociologist, journalist, columnist, essayist and writer. He is recognized for his essays and works on the social-political reality of Peru during the colonial era and the republican stage since independence.

== Life and career ==
Manrique was born in Huancayo, Junín on December 31, 1947.

His 1981 book Campesinado y nación: las guerrillas indígenas en la guerra con Chile, which is based on his 1979 thesis, is considered a milestone in the historiography of the War of the Pacific. He was a regular columnist for the newspaper La República.

The site Ciberayllu was conceived from a private email list started by Manrique.

Manrique died in Lima on January 11, 2026, at the age of 78.
