= El Peruano =

Official daily newspaper of Peru

- "Founded on 25 October 1825, by the liberator Simón Bolivar" "Official Journal of the Bicentennial"
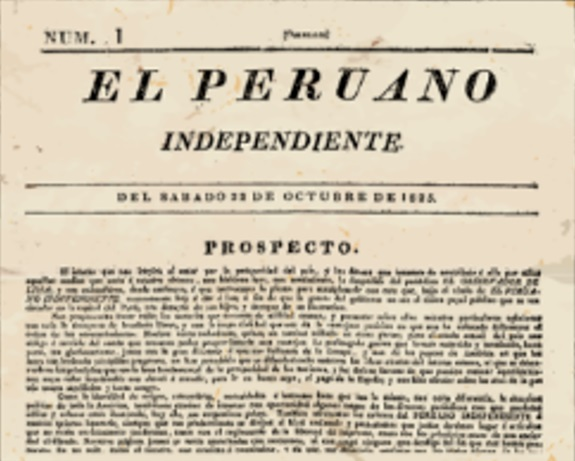
- First edition from 1825
- Type: Daily newspaper
- Owner(s): Peruvian Company of Editorial Services SA - Editora Peru
- Founder(s): Simón Bolívar
- Founded: October 22, 1825; 199 years ago
- Language: Spanish
- Country: Peru
- ISSN: 1605-3095 (print); 1605-3087 (web)
- Website: elperuano.pe

Diario Oficial El Peruano (The Peruvian Official Newspaper) is the daily official daily newspaper of Peru. The paper was founded on 22 October 1825 by Simón Bolívar although it changed names between the following decades and it was not published continuously since its inception. It is the oldest Spanish-language newspaper still in circulation. In addition to carrying news, all laws passed in Peru must be published by El Peruano.

It is currently edited by Delfina Becerra González. It is published by the Peruvian Company of Editorial Services SA - Editora Peru (Empresa Peruana de Servicios Editoriales SA - EDITORA PERÚ), a state enterprise under private law. The company was created as part of the national information system (Sistema Nacional de Información) established by Decreto Ley No. 20550 of 5 March 1974. This law included the various collective state media under a unified management, the majority of which returned to private ownership following the departure of the military regime from power.

== History ==
=== Early decades (1825-1854) ===
El Peruano was first published in Lima on 22 October 1825 under the name El Peruano Independiente, an "official" newspaper established by Simón Bolívar, who ordered Tomás de Heres to create a publication supporting his presence in Peru. In May 1826, the Ministry of Government declared the publication official and ordered that notices and documents relating to the civil service be inserted in it. Its name was changed to simply El Peruano on 13 May of that year. The cleric Lucas Pellicer was the first editor after the officialization of the publication.

The Gazette began publishing laws on 15 November 1826 because the newspaper El Registro Oficial, which was published for that purpose, was published irregularly. Over time El Registro Oficial lost its importance compared to El Peruano.

El Peruano underwent a series of name changes. It was called La Prensa Peruana under the leadership of José Joaquín de Larriva (1828-1829), El Conciliador under the leadership of Felipe Pardo y Aliaga (1830-1834). It was also called El Redactor Peruano (1834-1836 and 1838), La Gaceta de Gobierno (1835), El Eco del Protectorado (1836-1839), and in Lima El Eco del Norte (1837-1838).

== See also ==
- List of newspapers in Peru
- Media of Peru
