= Eusebio Grados =

Peruvian musician (1953–2020)

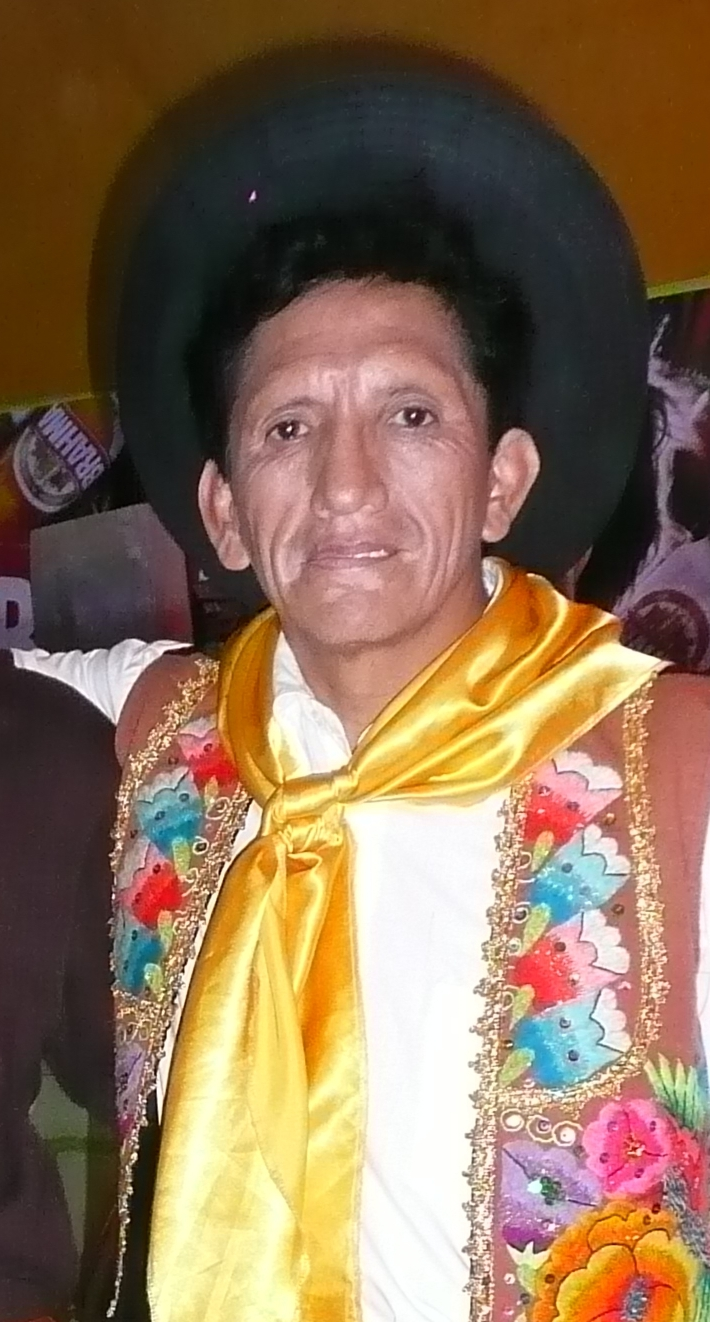
- Eusebio "Chato" Grados in 2008

Background information
- Also known as: Chato Grados
- Born: Eusebio Grados Robles; 2 December 1953; Atacocha, Pasco, Peru
- Died: 16 May 2020 (aged 66) Lima, Peru
- Genres: Huayno; Huaylarsh
- Occupation: Singer
- Instrument: Vocals
- Years active: 1969–2017

Eusebio Grados, also known as Chato Grados (December 2, 1953 – May 16, 2020) was a Peruvian huayno singer.

== Biography ==
=== First years ===
Eusebio "Chato" Grados was the second of the seven children of the marriage of the miner and musician Mateo Grados Tiza and the peasant and amateur singer Marina Robles Cabello. During his childhood he followed in his father's footsteps and worked in the mines of his native Pasco, while beginning his artistic career entertaining workers during breaks and strikes. He learned the Huanca footwork under the tutelage of the Huancaíno Rolando Navarro Vivas. He was also a footballer. Due to his love of music and huayno, he suffered bullying at school.

=== Career ===
He was discovered by Carmen Pizarro Rojas "Cori Wayta", daughter of the folklorist Luis Pizarro Cerrón, so he traveled to Lima with the artists' caravan of the company directed by Pizarro in the late 1960s, with the purpose of making a foothold in the world of folk music. Due to family complications, he had to return to Atacocha. A few years later he returned to the capital of Peru after a tour of the Department of Pasco, and won a musical contest in 1987 organized by Channel 7 with the Muliza song "Una patria sin pobres" by Bernardo Melgar, for which he won the award Urpicha de Oro.

His best known song was the Huaylarsh "El pío pío". It was written in 1988 after listening to a melody composed by Luis Anglas during the Huancaíno Carnival in Chongos Bajo that reminded him of the chirping of the chicks.

From this success it was widely known. In 1998 he was the host of the El Mañanero Andino and Chatoneando programs on the ATV network. He was also director, since 1990, of a popular singing school. He also directed the folk music group Las chicas mañaneras and the orchestra Los super mañaneros.

In 2000 he made a brief foray into politics, appearing for the Union for Peru party.

He was one of the main promoters of the celebration of the Day of the Andean Song that was recognized on June 15, 2006, by the government of Alejandro Toledo.

In 2008 he published his autobiography El rey del Pio Pio y los personajes que marcaron su vida.

=== Illness and death ===
In June 2017, he was diagnosed with bone marrow cancer. He also had kidney failure. Due to complications of his illness, he died on May 16, 2020, at the age of sixty-six due to cardiac arrest at the Guillermo Almenara Irigoyen Hospital in Lima.

== Awards and honours ==
He received various recognitions for his artistic career, among which are the Living Cultural Heritage title granted in 2005 by the National Institute of Culture and the appointment in 2013 as a Meritorious Personality of Culture by the Ministry of Culture and a diploma in merit to his artistic career through the Congress of the Republic. In 2016 he was recognized as a Golden Citizen by the Superior Court of Justice of Lima, and the following year the Junín Regional Government named him Favorite Son and Ambassador of the Junín Brand.

He was also awarded the statuette The Hummingbird of the Folklorist Artists Workers' Union of Peru and the Lima Medal of the Metropolitan Municipality of Lima received on November 28, 2010, for his ruby weddings.

His song "Pío Pío" has been recognized by Asociación de autores y compositores del Perú as a Musical Jewel and awarded with the Zafiro Musical Trophy.
