= Correo (newspaper) =

Daily newspaper from Peru

Diario Correo
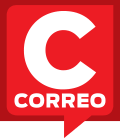
- Type: Daily newspaper
- Format: Tabloid
- Owner(s): El Comercio Group
- Founder(s): Luis Banchero Rossi
- Founded: 1962
- Political alignment: Conservatism
- Language: Spanish
- Headquarters: Lima
- Website: http://diariocorreo.pe/

Diario Correo is a daily newspaper with national circulation in Peru, directed by Iván Slocovich Pardo, belonging to the El Comercio Group.

== History ==
It was founded in Tacna, in 1962, by the fishing entrepreneur Luis Banchero Rossi, thus giving beginning to the Nacional Periodística Nacional SA, Epensa (it replaced the Sur newspaper there). It stood out at first for carrying out local editions in Arequipa, Piura, Tacna, Huancayo and Cuzco; However, it did not have a defined political position. It reached 150 thousand copies in 1964.

In 1974, when the Peruvian press was expropriated by the military government of Juan Velasco Alvarado, this newspaper became directed by Hugo Neira Samanez.

Correo circulated in Lima only until the early 1980s, but continued to be published in local editions in some cities in the interior of Peru. However, during the government of Alberto Fujimori, part of his assets were seized. After the fall of the regime, in 2000, it returned to circulation in Lima under the command of Juan Carlos Tafur and shortly after substantially increased the number of its local editions in the provinces.

== Controversies ==
The newspaper Correo has shown a conservative stance during the era of terrorism in the country.

On April 25, 2015, Correo published on its website an article titled "La otra cara de la moneda: así atacaron los antimineros", which generated controversy over the veracity of the information, and they were accused of setting up scenes. Correo censored the publication and defended itself by blaming the general editor of the Arequipa edition, opened an internal investigation process.

== See also ==
- Ojo (newspaper)
