= El Comercio (Peru) =

Daily newspaper from Peru

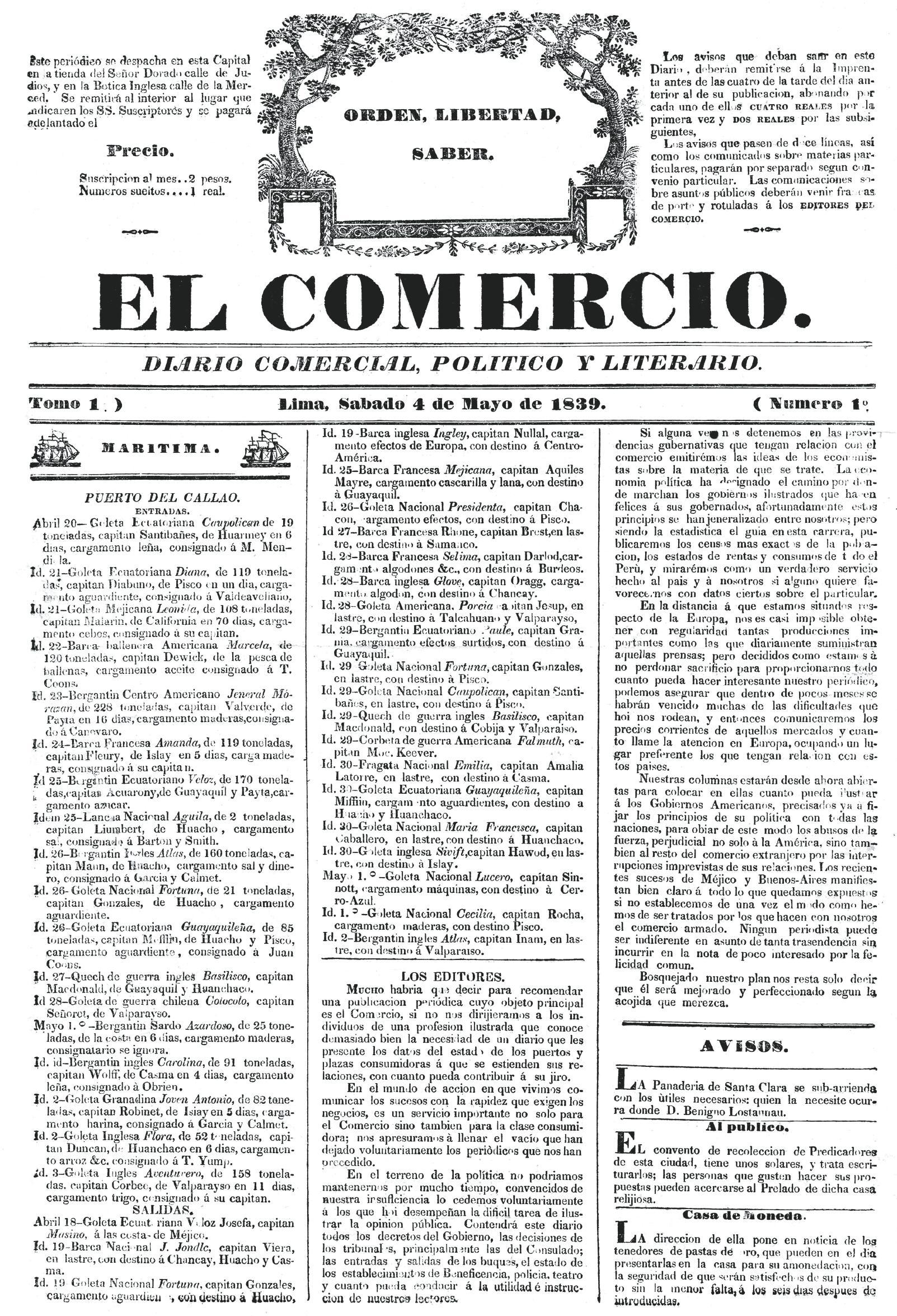
- Issue 1 released 4 May 1839.
- Type: Daily newspaper
- Format: Berliner (Monday–Friday); Broadsheet (Saturday–Sunday)
- Owner: El Comercio Group
- Editor: Juan José Garrido Koechlin
- Founded: 4 May 1839
- Political alignment: Conservatism
- Language: Spanish
- Headquarters: Lima
- Circulation: 120,000
- Sister newspapers: Trome, Perú.21, Gestión, Depor, La Prensa.
- Website: elcomercio.pe

El Comercio is a Peruvian newspaper based in Lima. Founded in 1839, it is the oldest newspaper in Peru and one of the oldest Spanish-language papers in the world. It has a daily circulation of more than 120,000. It is considered a newspaper of record and one of the most influential media in Peru.

== History ==
=== 19th century ===
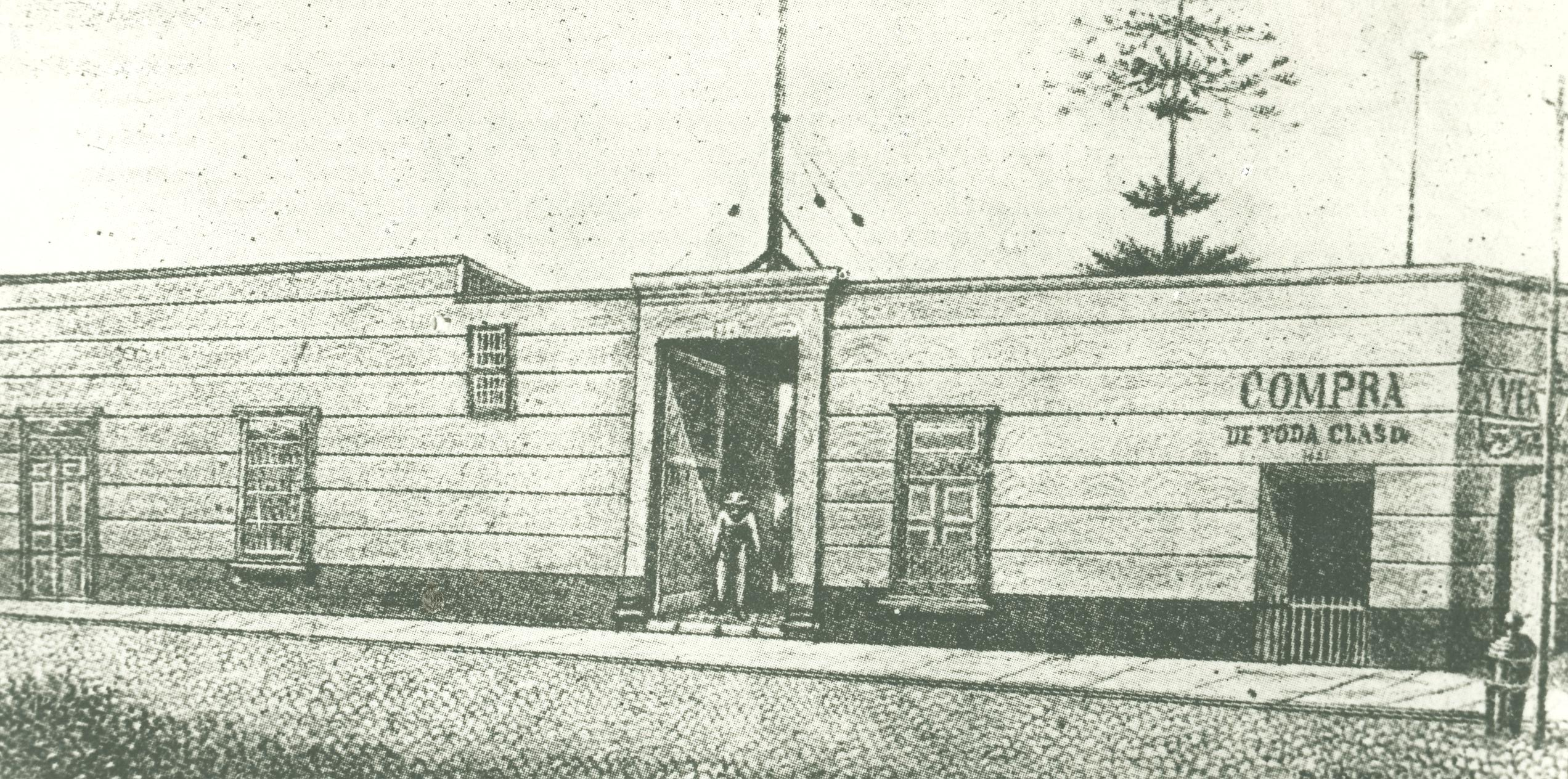
Headquarters in 1863.

El Comercio began as a commercial, political and literary newspaper. Its first publication was on Saturday, 4 May 1839, by José Manuel Amunátegui y Muñoz (Chile, 3 June 1802 — Lima 21 October 1886) and Alejandro Villota (Buenos Aires, 1803 — Paris, 20 February 1861). It was originally a one-sheet afternoon newspaper printed on both sides in tabloid format. The price of the first edition was one silver real. Its motto was "Order, freedom, knowledge." In total there were ten people who prepared the first issue. Printing was made on a handlebar "Scott" flatbed press, powered by a mule-driven winch.

Its first headquarters was the Casa de la Pila, located at Calle del Arzobispo No. 147 (current block 2 of Jr. Junín). Twenty-four days later it moved to Calle de San Pedro No. 63 (current block 3 of the Jr. Ucayali), both in the Cercado de Lima.

On 9 August 1839, the diary was published with four pages. Also in that month, its morning edition was launched and its afternoon edition was renamed from vespertina to de la tarde, remaining as such for a little more than 120 years. At the end of 1841, the newspaper moved to a farm located on the corner formed by the streets of San Antonio and La Rifa. Seventy-eight years later, this old house was demolished to make way for the new location on the corner of the current Lampa and Santa Rosa streets in the historic centre of Lima. In 1855, he acquired his first "Marinoni" reaction press, which was powered by steam and produced just over a thousand copies per hour.

On 1 January 1867, José Antonio Miró Quesada (Panama City, 15 January 1845 — Lima, 20 October 1930) began working at the newspaper as a correspondent in Callao at the age of twenty-two. In 1875, Manuel Amunátegui gave control of the newspaper to Luis Carranza Ayarza and José Antonio Miró Quesada, who formed the company Carranza, Miró Quesada y Compañía. They established in the act of incorporation that, after the death of the first of them, the surviving partner could purchase the company's shares without the family of the deceased having any other right than to receive the respective financial compensation.

Between 16 January 1880, and 23 October 1884, El Comercio stopped publishing as a consequence of the closure ordered by Nicolás de Piérola and the subsequent occupation of Lima by the Chilean Army during the War of the Pacific.

After Carranza's death in 1898, Miró Quesada acquired the shares and since then the Miró Quesada family has controlled the newspaper.

=== 20th century ===
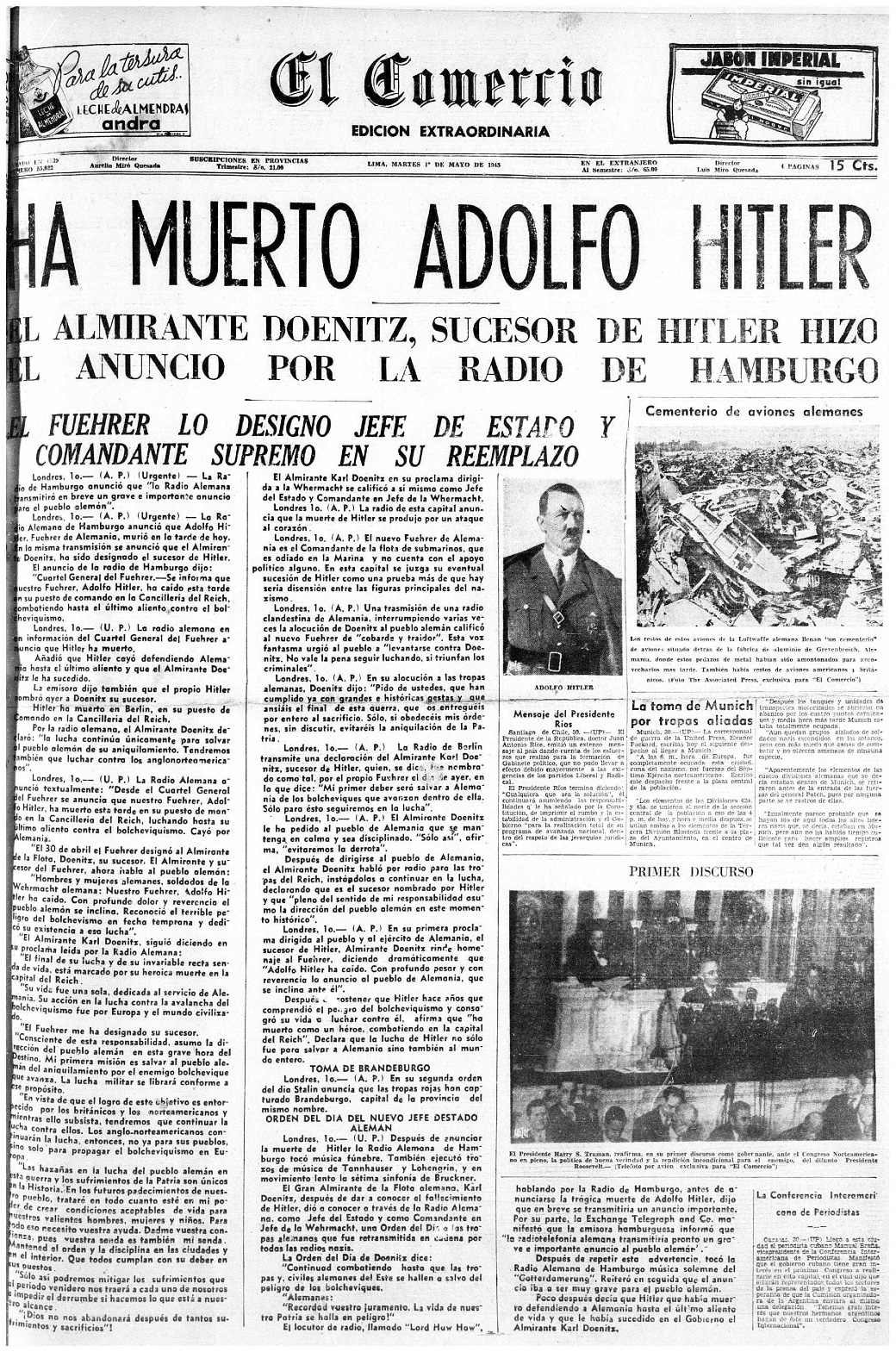
1 May 1945, edition announcing the death of Adolf Hitler.

At the beginning of the 20th century, El Comercio would become the most influential newspaper in the country, whose Miró Quesada family was the most powerful at that time.

On 19 January 1902, the newspaper inaugurated its first "Marinoni" electric rotary press and its new stereotyping workshop, based on the use of movable typographic characters which, in October 1904, was complemented with the entry into operation of the first linotypes that were used in Peru, being the third newspaper in South America to implement it.

On 21 January 1917, a modern "Goss" rotary press was put into operation, with which thirty-two page copies could be printed, and the printing workshops were expanded. By 1922, it reached 40 thousand editions. On 4 May 1924, the traditional headquarters were inaugurated in the same location on the corner of Jr. Lampa and jr. Miró Quesada (today Santa Rosa) in the historic center of Lima.

On 3 July 1928, José Antonio Miró Quesada, by public deed, established a public limited company with his children called Empresa Editora El Comercio S. A. This is how his son Antonio Miró Quesada de la Guerra would later assume management of the newspaper, who, together with his wife, was murdered by an Aprista Party member on 15 May 1935, when they were walking to lunch at the National Club. He was later succeeded as director of El Comercio by several members of the Miró Quesada family. In the 1930s, Carlos Miró-Quesada Laos served as director of the newspaper and was a proponent for fascism in Peru.

On 3 March 1951, in response to competition from other newspapers and new media such as radio broadcasting, it was the first Peruvian newspaper to implement the use of the radio photo system and shortly after, on 5 August 1952, it put into operation a modern "Westrex Divatel" teletype that captured 3,600 words per hour. which allowed the newspaper to report current events in the world as a scoop a few hours after they occurred with their corresponding photograph. On 29 March 1953, El Comercio became the first Peruvian newspaper to publish a cultural section as a specialised Sunday supplement. Previously, cultural pages were published on Saturdays. On 2 May 1959, the last front page of the newspaper with advertisements was published. On 4 May of the same year (anniversary date), the first morning edition was published with a completely news cover and a renewed design that would remain for twenty-four years.

Despite this, the publishing company entered into conflict with its workers; amid accusations of difficult working conditions, some were fired.

In 1962, El Comercio Gráfico was launched to replace the newspaper's evening edition. In July 1966, the "Hoe Colormatic" rotary press was inaugurated, releasing up to seventy thousand copies per hour and allowing the newspaper to publish color photographs. In 1971, El Comercio Gráfico was cancelled and replaced by the sports newspaper Aficción, which only existed for a few years.

The military government of Juan Velasco Alvarado expropriated the newspapers on 28 July 1974 (Decree-Law No. 20 681). So, El Comercio was theoretically dedicated to serving the peasant communities, but in practice it became a spokesperson for the regime. Héctor Cornejo Chávez, president of the Christian Democratic Party and supporter of Velasco, was appointed as director. This expropriation was signed by one of the family members: Fernando Miró-Quesada Bahamonde, who at that time was Minister of Health. The Peruvian media were returned to their rightful owners by President Fernando Belaúnde Terry on 28 July 1980, the same day he assumed office. The management of El Comercio was assumed by Alejandro Miró-Quesada Garland and Aurelio Miró-Quesada Sosa.

At the beginning of 1982, El Comercio began the progressive change of the old linotype editing systems and began to be designed using computers, a transition successfully completed on 23 November 1983, with the adoption of an electronic photocomposition system. On 28 June 1984, he inaugurated a large printing plant in the Pueblo Libre district on an area of eighteen thousand m^{2} with a new rotary offset press "M.A.N. Roland Lithomatic II" with the ability to print the journal completely in colour.

Also in 1984, the "School Page" section was created, where journalistic articles by hundreds of schoolchildren from all over Peru began to be published. Although no longer in the printed version, the School Correspondents program continues with teaching and training in journalistic training topics for young schoolchildren.

In the mid-1990s, a new computerised publishing and digital pre-press system was implemented, in which it experimented with Infobanco, its subscription information service. In 1996 it was agreed to purchase 15% of Telefónica del Perú. On 15 January 1997, El Comercio launched its internet website. Also in that year, the printing plant was modernised with the acquisition of a new "Goss Newsliner" rotary press that was added to the previous one. All of which allowed El Comercio to have, since 19 January 1999, an avant-garde design in a slightly smaller size although still maintaining the traditional large format that it had used since the mid-19th century.

In 1998, the newspaper established its writing and style manual. Between November 1999 and February 2000, the company underwent a restructuring to save costs of up to one million dollars annually.

==== Team of Ricardo Uceda ====
In 1994, Ricardo Uceda resigned as editor-in-chief of Sí to form a special investigative team at El Comercio. As with Uceda's Sí reporting, the Comercio team focused on cases of governmental corruption. One their most notable successes came in 1998, when they exposed the misuse of state funds intended for the survivors of floods and mudslides induced by the 1997-98 El Niño event; the story resulted in the arrest and imprisonment of Civil Defence Chief General Homero Nureña.

=== 21st century ===
The newspaper is owned by shareholders of the Miró Quesada family, whose ownership of the company dates to 1875. Despite this, management is under control of an individual who is not a member of the family.

The company has ownership over its subsidiaries, the newspapers Peru 21 and Trome, and the magazine Somos.

The corporation, Empresa Editora El Comercio S.A., is the product of the merging of many companies in 1996. The company manages the editing, publication, and distribution of the newspaper, El Comercio, as well as the publication and distribution of Trome, Peru 21, and Gestion. In addition, they manage the advertising aspects of the mentioned publications. Additionally, they are devoted to the editing, publication, and distribution of many other books, magazines, pamphlets, weeklies, all sorts of graphic publications, Multimedia products, and videography. Informational content is distributed by their subsidiary Orbis Ventures S.A.C., a company in charge of the administration of the company's website.

The legal address of the company, where their administrative offices were in 300 Jr. Santa Rosa, Lima, Lima, Peru. Their publishing factories, Pando and Amauta, are in the districts of Pueblo Libre and the Cercado of Lima.

The new legal address is in 171 Av. Jorge Salazar Araoz, La Victoria, Lima.

Financially, the company operates very independently, as the effects of consolidation have not in large part affected the operation of their subsidiaries, Orbis Ventures S.A.C., Zetta Comunicadores del Perú S.A.E.M.A., EC Jobs S.A.C., Punto y Coma Editores S.A.C., Suscripciones Integrales S.A.C., Amauta Impressiones Comerciales, Producciones Cantabria S.A.C., Inmobiliaria El Sol S.A. and Grupo PluralTV.

== Political alignment ==
Historically, Miró Quesada Laos promoted fascist propaganda in the newspaper, writing in support of Falangism targeting a national audience.

The newspaper has been described as conservative and holding an ideological position is center-right. Barnhurst described El Comercio as "the most conservative newspaper" in Peru in a review of the media in the nation. According to Wayka, Elisabeth Dulanto Baquerizo de Miró Quesada, a member of the Miró Quesada family which owns El Comercio Group, signed the Madrid Charter and has helped hold events for the anti-leftist organization Madrid Forum, a group that was organized by the far-right Spanish party Vox.

== See also ==
- América Televisión
- List of newspapers in Peru
- Media of Peru
