= El Comercio Group =

Peruvian publishing company

Empresa Editora El Comercio SA
- Type: Public limited company
- Traded as: BVL: ELCOMEI1
- Industry: Mass media
- Founded: July 1, 1996; 30 years ago
- Headquarters: Lima, Peru
- Net income: ▲PEN S/11.164 million (2024)
- Total assets: ▼PEN S/1.624 billion (2024)
- Owner: Miró Quesada family
- Number of employees: 884 (2020)
- Website: grupoelcomercio.com.pe

El Comercio Group (GEC) is a Peruvian media conglomerate that owns multiple newspapers, television stations and other entities. The largest media conglomerate in Peru and one of the largest in South America, El Comercio Group is owned by the Miró Quesada family.

== History ==
The newspaper El Comercio was founded by Manuel Amunátegui and Alejandro Villota on 4 May 1839. Originally founded as Infobanco-Teleinformative Services in 1991, would later change to Empresa Editora El Comercio S.A on 1 July 1996.

Canal N was launched as a news channel on 4 July 1999 as a subscription television channel. Plural TV Group was launched on 5 March 2003 in a partnership between El Comercio Group and La República Group, with El Comercio owning seventy percent of Plural TV while La República owned the remaining thirty percent. Canal N, América Televisión, Radio América and Disney Radio Peru were then managed by Plural TV Group.

In 2024, El Comercio Group signed a media cooperation agreement with China Media Group.

=== Epensa purchase ===
El Comercio Group acquired Empresa Periodistica Nacional SA (Epensa) in August 2013, resulting with the group owning 80% of the printed press in Peru. Following the controversial acquisition of Epensa, the company began to diversify its operations in 2014, changing its name from Empresa Editora El Comercio S.A. to Vigenta Inversiones S.A. and some of its naming from El Comercio Group to Ecomedia. El Comercio Group also began to enter into the education and entertainment market in Chile and Colombia at the same time.

=== Operation Caledonia ===
In 2019, Perú.21 reported that a group of Peruvian investors secretly tried to purchase the journalist branch of El Comercio Group in what was called "Operation Caledonia", attempting to do so with the help of former mayor of New York City and Keiko Fujimori's former advisor, Rudy Giuliani. According to journalist Augusto Álvarez Rodrich, those included in the Operation Caledonia group included owner of Willax Televisión Erasmo Wong Lu, Peruvian businessman and owner of Expreso Rafael López Aliaga and Popular Force politician José Chlimper.

== Headquarters ==
Grupo El Comercio
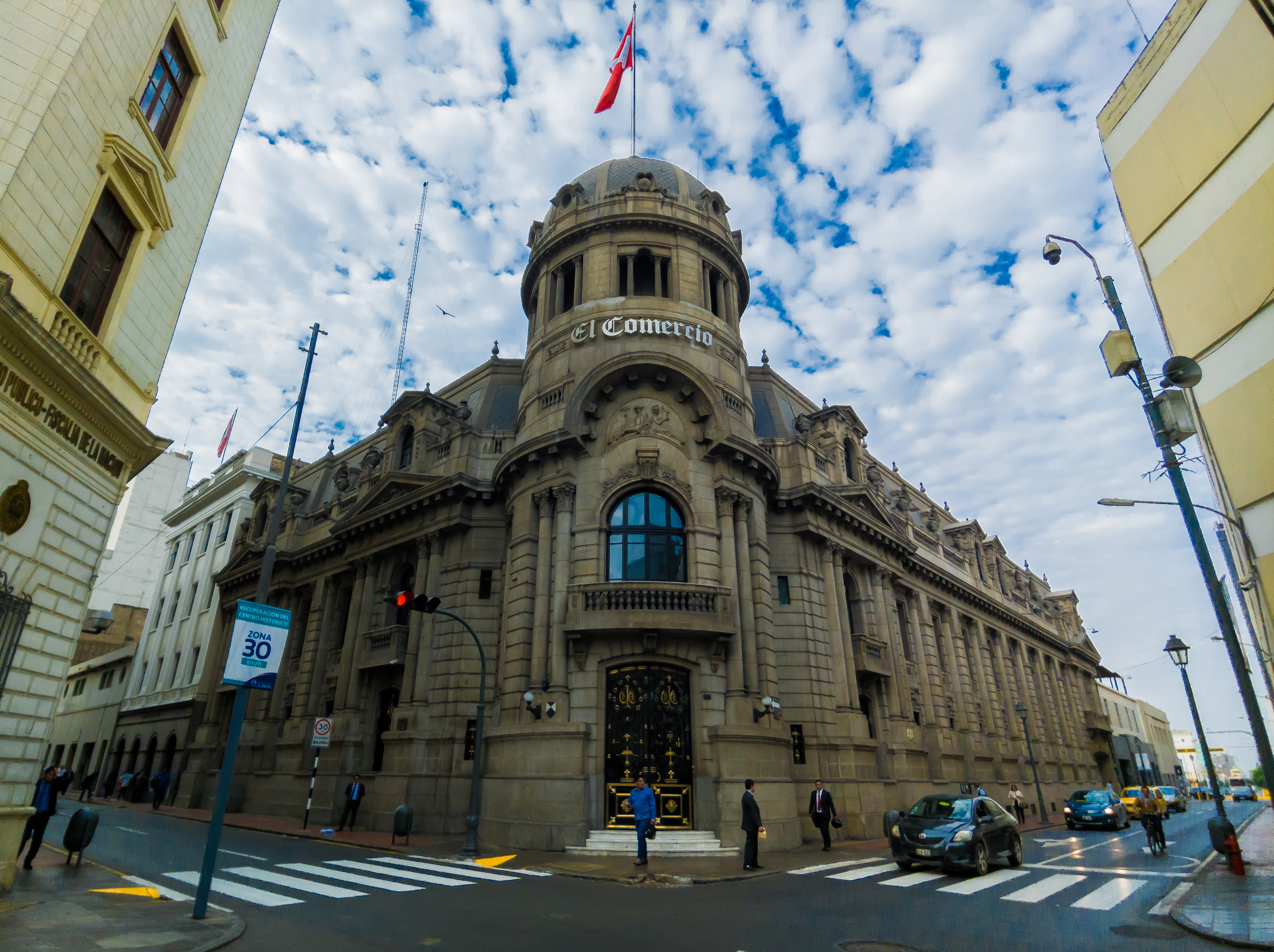

General information
- Groundbreaking: 1921
- Opened: 1924
- Owner: El Comercio Group

Design and construction
- Architects: Felipe González del Riego; Enrique Rivero Tremouille

The group's headquarters is located in the historic centre of Lima, at the corners of Lampa and Santa Rosa streets.

The building is located at the site of a single-storey building that also served as the headquarters of the newspaper, which featured a 20-metre Pine tree in its patio. On September 10, 1919, a crowd headed by then newly inaugurated President Augusto B. Leguía met at what was then the Plaza Francisco Antonio de Zela to attend a "political rally" of Leguía. From the square, the crowd headed to the headquarters of both El Comercio and La Prensa, with the latter being burned down and the former being defended from the inside by armed journalists until it was ultimately breached and also burned down. The house of then director Antonio Miró Quesada—who was overseas at the time—was also burned down, with his family escaping through the building's rooftop.

After the events, Miró Quesada commissioned his son Aurelio, engineer and manager of the newspaper, to seek financing to erect a new building in the same location. Obtaining the funds was difficult as local banks did not wish to antagonise the "Patria Nueva" of Leguía, but Miró Quesada nevertheless acquired them and the new building began construction in 1921. Architects Felipe González del Riego and Enrique Rivero Tremouille designed the new fortress-inspired building, and construction lasted three years. The interior's crystal lamppost and iron gates (which feature the newspaper's initials and the caduceus, both imported from Belgium) were designed by Aurelio's brother Miguel. The flooring (the work of bricklayer José Falco and his assistant Zúñiga) and marble staircase (the work of the aforementioned Zúñiga) were imported from Italy. The archive's bookstands were the work of Díaz Alva and a group of Japanese workers worked on the baseboards and window frames.

The building was never formally inaugurated as protocol required the invitation of Leguía. Instead, a great lunch was organised by José Antonio Miró Quesada and his children in honour of the international journalists visiting the city for the ten-day centennial celebrations of the Battle of Ayacucho. The building's main hall served as the location of the wake of Antonio Miró Quesada de la Guerra and his wife María Laos, both murdered by a member of the Aprista Party in 1935.

In December 2025, the company approved the sale of the building, as well as its printing press in Pueblo Libre, through a trust.

== Influence and political orientation ==
El Comercio Group is the largest media conglomerate in Peru and one of the largest in South America. Though they opposed the Alberto Fujimori government, the company has typically supported right-wing politicians, including President Alan García and Alberto's daughter, Keiko Fujimori. From the 2011 Peruvian general election to the 2021 Peruvian general election, El Comercio supported Fujimori. According to Wayka, Elisabeth Dulanto Baquerizo de Miró Quesadao of the family who owns El Comercio group signed the Madrid Charter and has helped hold events for the anti-leftist organization Madrid Forum, a group that was organized by the far-right Spanish party Vox.

The 2013 acquisition of Epensa was controversial to some observers who noted that the purchase of Epensa moved the conglomerate from owning fifty percent of Peru's newspapers purchased up to owning seventy-eight percent of sales. To these observers, the acquisition allowed El Comercio group to limit press freedom by controlling opinions published in their newspapers, though El Comercio Group denied such allegations. President Ollanta Humala denounced the acquisition saying that the move gave the conglomerate too much influence and called on legislators to oversee the controversy. Eight journalists in November 2013 filed a lawsuit in Peru's Constitutional Court to block the acquisition of Epensa and on 24 June 2021, Judge Juan Macedo Cuenca ruled to nullify the purchase citing "a violation of the constitutional right of freedom of expression and information - information pluralism". El Comercio Group decided to appeal the judge's decision.

One of the company's main shareholders José Alejandro Graña Miró Quesada of the Miró Quesada family was arrested in late 2017 after his Graña & Montero construction company was involved in the Odebrecht scandal.

== Company units ==
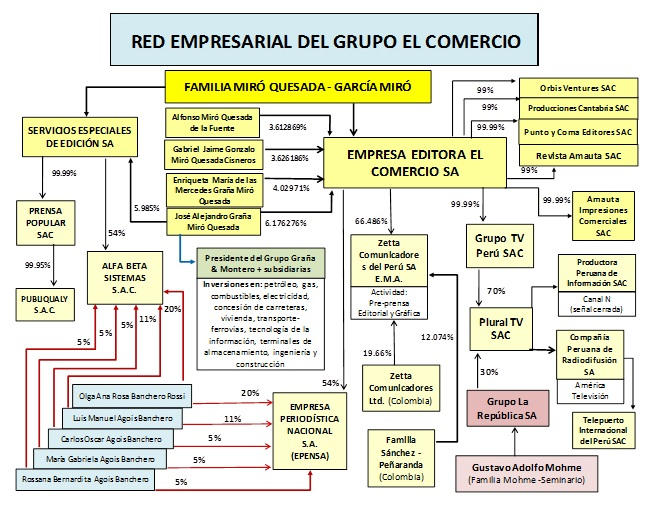
Business network of El Comercio Group as of 2016

El Comercio Group is divided into four Business Units:

- Press Business Unit – The company owns the top five selling newspapers in Peru; Trome, Ojo, Correo, El Comercio and Peru.21. Other press entities include Depor, El Bocón, Gestión, Revista Aptitus, Revista Casa & Más, Revista Hola Perú, Revista G, Revista Mujer Actual, Revista Mujer Trome, Revista Ruedas & Nuts, Revista Somos, Revista Urbania Premiun and Revista Vamos. El Comercio Group also controls the distribution of The New York Times and Publimetro in Peru.
- Television Business Unit – América Multimedia and its subsidiaries, América Televisión, Canal N, Radio América and Disney Radio Peru.
- Digital Business Unit – ComercioXpress, Lumingo, Neoauto and PagoEfectivo
- Services Business Unit – Amauta Impressiones Comerciales

== See also ==
- Media of Peru
- Newspapers in Peru
- Television in Peru
