= Chicha press =

Peruvian nickname for tabloid newspapers

Chicha Press (Prensa Chicha in Spanish) is a Peruvian nickname for sensationalist tabloid newspapers that first emerged in the 1980s. The etymology of Chicha Press is derived from the name for certain drinks made from corn (e.g. Chicha de jora), which later came to be used by some in Peru describe the culture of Andean migrants to the capital region of Lima during the 1960s. The concept of Chicha press became a central part of the national culture in 2000 when it was popularized by Alberto Fujimori to discredit opponents of his government in the general elections of 2000.

== Characteristics ==
These newspapers usually share these features:

1. Use slang in headlines and/or news items
2. Sometimes portray females in bikini / partially nude on its front page
3. A focus on murder, rape ("crónica roja") and local showbiz ("farándula").
4. Are designed to appeal to the less educated segment of the Peruvian population.
5. Tabloid format (there has never been a full-size chicha newspaper).

== List of Chicha newspapers ==
This is a partial list of Peruvian newspapers considered "prensa chicha":

- "Ajá"
- "El Chino" ("El Chino" is Peruvians' nickname for former president Alberto Fujimori)
- "El Popular"
- "El Trome" (Note: owned by ECO, owner of "El Comercio")
- "El Tío"
- "El Chato"
- "El Men"
- "El Mañanero"
- "La Chuchi" ("Chuchi" is the name of a TV parody of the ex-congresswoman Susy Díaz)
- "Más"
- "La Repúdica" (made directly to attack La República)
- "Repudio" (made directly to attack La República)
- "El Matadero"
- "El Chuculún" (Peruvian slang for sex)

== See also ==
- List of newspapers in Peru
- Media of Peru
