= La República =

Peruvian newspaper

- Type: Daily newspaper
- Format: Berliner
- Owner: Grupo La República
- Founded: November 16, 1981
- Language: Spanish
- Headquarters: Lima
- Country: Peru
- Website: larepublica.pe

La República (Spanish: [la reˈpuβlika]) is a Peruvian newspaper based in Lima, Peru. It is one of the two main national daily newspapers sold all over the country since it was founded on November 16, 1981.

== History ==
=== Founding and early history ===
The paper was founded in 1981 by Gustavo Mohme Llona, a former member of the Peruvian Congress. Peruvian journalist Guillermo Thorndike served as the newspaper's founding editor and had previous experience working for many newspapers in Peru. Under Mohme's leadership, the newspaper was against the candidacy of Mario Vargas Llosa in the 1990 Peruvian general election.

=== Fujimori administration ===
La República was also the main newspaper in opposition to the government of President Alberto Fujimori, who was in office from 1990 to 2000, reporting on illegal actions performed by the government, Peruvian Armed Forces and intelligence agencies. During his government, journalists from the newspaper faced violence and were placed under surveillance by the National Intelligence Service (SIN), which would reportedly publish "libelous" articles in the chicha press attacking Llona and press workers. The newspaper was seized by the military during the 1992 Peruvian self-coup and censored, though once staff regained control of their facilities, they printed a blank edition of the newspaper in protest.

In April 1997, deputy editor of La República Blanca Rosales had two armed men break into her car and held her at gunpoint while they drove her through the streets of Lima, threatening to kill her. The incident occurred at a time when other journalists were violently threatened following controversial reporting, with La República publishing a story that the intelligence group of the Peruvian Army had tortured individuals in the days before Rosales was attacked.

Mohme would die in 2000 and Grupo La República would then be owned by Momhe's son, Gustavo Adolfo Mohme Seminario.

=== Recent history ===
For the 2011 Peruvian general election, the newspaper supported the presidential candidacy of Ollanta Humala and changed to the Berliner newspaper format that year. Vargas Llosa would also write columns for the paper, helping its popularity.

== Political stance and editorial opinion ==
The newspaper's holding company has a center-right political stance with small socialist opinions, while the editorial staff posture ranges from the center-left to the left-wing, being supportive of progressive stances. According to Associate Professor Joseph Pozsgai-Alvarez of Osaka University, La República is overall "a politically neutral outlet and one of the most important in the country".

== Events ==
La República organizes popular awards that recognize outstanding achievements in Peruvian and Asian entertainment.

=== Fame Awards ===
The Fame Awards (Spanish: Premios Fama) are annual awards presented by the newspaper to celebrate the best of Peruvian entertainment and arts. Categories cover television, film, theater, music, and literature, and winners are selected through public voting.

=== Asian Culture Awards ===
The Asian Culture Awards (Spanish: Premios Cultura Asiática; also known as PCA) are awards created by the newspaper's Cultura Asiática section. They honored achievements in Asian entertainment, mainly K-pop, C-pop, Korean dramas, Chinese dramas, and Thai dramas.

The first edition (PCA 2020) was held between late December 2020 and early January 2021 and included 16 categories. These covered Best Male K-pop Group, Best Female K-pop Group, Best K-pop Debut, Best K-pop Legend, Best K-pop Soloist, Best J-pop Group, Best C-pop Group, Best Korean Drama, Best Korean Actor, Best Korean Actress, Best Korean Rising Star, Best Chinese Drama, Best Chinese Artist, Best Thai Drama, Best Thai Artist, and Best Asian Debut Artist. Winners were announced on 9 January 2021.

The second edition (PCA 2021) took place in December 2021 and expanded to around 24 categories. New additions included awards for Best K-pop Group by generation (1st, 2nd, 3rd, and 4th generation), Best K-drama (Daesang), separate categories for Best Chinese Actor and Best Chinese Actress, Best Thai Actor and Best Thai Actress, as well as Popular Artist categories for Chinese and Thai performers. Results were revealed on 28 December 2021.

== See also ==
- List of newspapers in Peru
- Media of Peru
- Gustavo Mohme
- Francisco Sagasti
