= Óscar Miró Quesada de la Guerra =

Peruvian journalist and scientist

Óscar Miró Quesada
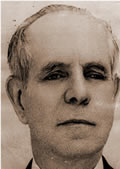
- Born: July 30, 1884; Lima, Peru
- Died: August 12, 1981; Lima, Peru
- Other name: Racso
- Occupations: Journalist, scientist

Óscar Miró Quesada de la Guerra (July 30, 1884 — August 12, 1981), also known as Racso, was a prominent Peruvian scientist and journalist.

== Biography ==
Miró Quesada was born in Lima on July 30, 1884, the son of José Antonio Miró Quesada and Matilde de la Guerra Gorostidi. He completed his studies at the Universidad Nacional Mayor de San Marcos, which were oriented towards the humanities and social disciplines. He was a member of several academies in Peru.

From the age of fifteen he began to write popular science articles in the "El comercio" newspaper in Lima – displaying a deep and varied culture – which were disseminated first in the Peruvian sphere and then in the American South and finally in Europe, his works dealt with – among others – psychoanalyst concepts, integral psychology, modern philosophy and relativity.

A friend sent his articles to Albert Einstein, his response was a concise letter where he expressed his surprise at the work accomplished. So remarkable was Racso's work that Albert Einstein, said in a letter dated November 21, 1939:

I've been really surprised that a newspaper offers its readers a very thorough and accurate exposition on a scientific subject. The articles I find, indeed reproduce well the essential content of the thought of the written book ... for me, as much as I can judge from my incomplete knowledge of Spanish. This is an interesting sign of the trends and scientific interests that are starting to migrate to the New World.

A comment that equally honors, not just Racso, but his many Peruvian, Argentine, Chilean and other readers scattered throughout the world. He died in Lima in 1981.

== Literary work ==
Racso produced multiple works, the most prominent of which was La relatividad y los quanta (1940)(Relativity and quanta) published by Editorial Zig-Zag (Chile). Through this work he put the relativity theory within reach of the lay reader, which before 1940, was only found in North American and European libraries.

In his book, he not only translated Einstein's work The Evolution of Physics into Spanish, but it was the first translation into that language. In this work he discussed and analyzed the theory in depth, to a point that is still powerful, and today it remains a valuable historical reference text. This work is a compilation of 22 articles published in the cultural supplement of the Sunday editions of the El Comercio newspaper in Lima.

== Bibliography ==
- 'Problemas Éticos-sociológicos del Perú (1907) – Ethical – sociological Problems of Peru.
- Formación del Profesorado Secundario (1908) – Secondary Teacher Education.
- El arte y la cultura General (1911) – General Art and culture.
- Algo sobre el Divorcio (1911) – Something about Divorce.
- Con Motivo del Tricentenario de Cervantes (1916) – On the occasion of the Tercentenary of Cervantes.
- La Salud del Cuerpo Humano (1916) – The Health of the Human Body.
- El caso del Asesino Montes (1916) – The case of Montes Murderer.
- Las Enfermedades Evitables (1917) – Preventable Diseases.
- Elementos de Geografía Científica del Perú (1919) – Elements of the Scientific Geography of Peru.
- Conferencia de Sociología (1920) – Sociology Conference.
- La realidad del Ideal (1922) – The reality of the Ideal.
- Mesología Criminal Peruana (1922) – Peruvian Criminal Mesology.
- Versos (1923) – Verses.
- Tres conferencias (1923) – Three conferences.
- Enseñanza de la Nueva Geografía (1923) – Teaching of the New Geography.
- Psicología Integral (1925) – Integral Psychology.
- La Moneda y el Cambio (1923) – Money and Change.
- Lo que es la Filosofía (1934) – What Philosophy is.
- Por los Campos de la Gramática (1936) – On the Fields of Grammar.
- Psicoanálisis y Perfeccionamiento Individual (1937) – Psychoanalysis and Individual Perfection.
- La relatividad y los quanta (1940) – Relativity and quantum.
- Dualidad en Cervantes y en el "Quijote" (1953) – Duality in Cervantes and "Don Quixote".
- Oscar Miró Quesada de la guerra: Rasco, periodista (1985) – Oscar Miró Quesada de la guerra': Rasco, journalist.
