= Mass media in Peru =

The mass media in Peru includes a variety of different types of media, including television, radio, cinema, newspapers, magazines, and Internet-based web sites. Much of the print-based media in Peru is over a century old, with some newspapers even dating back to the time of independence.

Peru's media organizations control the public sphere, with wealthy families controlling much of the media and influencing decisions in the nation to serve their economic interests. About 80% of the largest media companies in Peru are owned by relatives of the same family. The mainstream media in Peru is typically economically and politically conservative. Since the 2020s, previously reputable mainstream outlets began to spread pseudoscience regarding the COVID-19 pandemic and political disinformation, resulting with increased political polarization. Trusted media has turned towards independent media websites that have assumed the investigative journalism in the nation, with the two leading investigative organizations being IDL-Reporteros and OjoPúblico.

== History ==
Since the intense periods of internal conflict in Peru in the 1980s and 1990s, the government, military, and media in Peru described any individual who was left on the political spectrum as being a threat to the nation, with many students, professors, union members, and peasants being jailed or killed for their political beliefs. Reporters investigating the government of Alberto Fujimori faced violence, with some being abducted and killed; from 1990 to 1996, at least eighteen journalists were assassinated, with most being from interior provinces.

In response to President Martin Vizcarra's actions to dissolve Congress in 2019, the media in Peru began a fearmongering campaign, arguing that left-wing political candidates would be elected in the 2020 Peruvian parliamentary election and attempt to draft a new constitution.

Into the 2020s, mainstream private media began to lose its reputation due to its use of disinformation, especially during the 2021 Peruvian general election. Outside of Lima, many media staff in rural areas were laid off during the COVID-19 pandemic in Peru, while hundreds of other journalists died due to COVID-19. For the first round of elections, Peruvian media focused attacks against center-left candidate Veronika Mendoza. The media's attacks resulted with support moving from Mendoza to Pedro Castillo, who was further left on the political spectrum. In the second round of elections, Peru's major media networks were described as aligning with Keiko Fujimori to discredit Castillo. Some news media allegedly disseminated fake news against Castillo while also creating a positive image of Fujimori. Despite media attacks against Castillo, he would win the presidency. During the Peruvian protests following the 2022 Peruvian political crisis, the media in Peru avoided coverage of demonstrations, with 60% of respondents of an Institute of Peruvian Studies poll saying that the media held a bias with protest coverage.

== Types ==
=== Television ===
Television is the most popular medium in Peru. Among Peru's television networks is Latina Televisión, which was the subject of considerable controversy and indirectly led to a case being decided by the Inter-American Court of Human Rights. Latina covered several stories of corruption in the Fujimori government when it was owned by Baruch Ivcher. However, Baruch Ivcher was stripped of his Peruvian citizenship and forced to sell his shares of the channel below market value to pro-Fujimori businessmen. Ivcher took the case to court, and the Inter-American Court of Human Rights eventually decided in his favor.

Another channel in Peru is Canal N, a 24-hour cable news channel that is a joint venture between El Comercio and Telefónica. Other Peruvian networks include América Televisión, which was purchased by El Comercio and La República, Panamericana Televisión, which secretly sold its editorial line to Vladimiro Montesinos, and public broadcasting station TV Perú.

Some VHF stations like Latina and TV PERU broadcast their on-air feeds via Internet. Starting in 2006 some TV stations have appeared like TELURICA and in 2007 Frecuencia Primera RTVN released CANAL 200, using the name as they were created in 1976. TELURICA produces their own Internet Only programmes but CANAL 200 shows just clips and some sample productions.

=== Newspapers ===
The oldest newspaper in Peru is El Peruano, which was founded by Simón Bolívar on October 22, 1825. El Peruano acts as the official newspaper of record, and all laws passed in Peru must be published in the daily. Despite El Peruano's official status, it does not have the largest circulation among Peruvian dailies.

Lima-based El Comercio, founded on May 7, 1839, is one of the most important Peruvian newspapers. It is also the oldest privately owned paper in the country. The Miró Quesada family controls El Comercio, which has a right-wing political stance.

La República, founded on May 3, 1981, is another important newspaper. The newspaper overall has a centre-right political stance with small socialist opinions. La República ardently opposed the government of Alberto Fujimori, and continues to refer to him as the "ex-dictator." La República was founded and edited by Gustavo Mohme Llona, who was formerly a member of Congress. It is now edited by his son, Gustavo Mohme Seminario.

In addition to these three newspapers, there are several other newspapers, including, for example, Peru.21, Correo, and La Razón, which is extremely pro-Fujimori. There are also several sensationalist tabloids that are considered to be part of the "chicha press", which often include vulgar content. Such papers frequently feature women wearing bikinis or less and show pictures of dead bodies on their front pages. During the government of Fujimori, Vladimiro Montesinos secretly purchased the editorial lines of such tabloids through bribery.

According to a readership survey done in Lima in December 2010, the five most widely read newspapers were Trome (1,824.6 thousand readers), Ojo (526.0), El Comercio (467.6), Perú21 (293.4), and El Popular (225.8)

=== Radio ===
Since the existence of radio in Peru, it has been a popular source of information due to its ease of access. Many radio stations exist throughout Peru, including Radio Programas del Perú. The history of radio in Peru can be categorized into the first historical period of (1925-1936) when radio transformed from an elite medium to a mass media. The second period (1937-1956) began with the creation of Radio Nacional del Perú with a regulation toward commercial radio broadcast on such topics as entertainment. The period is considered the golden age of radio in Peru. The third period (1956-1980) tried to reconcile radio industry with the newly established television industry. The fourth period (1980-2000) begins with the return of the media companies to their owners, the formation of new networks and corporations, and the development of popular radio. Many Peruvians continued to utilize the radio for information in the 2020s, though news stories typically lack depth and details.

Peruvian listeners prefer FM stations instead of MW and SW stations. Major cities such as Lima, Arequipa and Trujillo have their FM dial full. Since 1990, most of these stations have been acquired by large radio corporations in order to monopolize the dial. Only a very few independent stations survived this wave. As a consequence, the Peruvian government does not currently give licenses for new frequencies. This is one of the reasons that since late 1990s pirate radios and internet radio have appeared and are increasing. Internet-only media started in 1995 with some on-demand broadcasts in RealAudio done by Frecuencia Primera RTVN, Red Cientifica Peruana, Peru.Com and Radio Programas. Currently there are over 10 thousand online stations; some of them are Internet Only but some others are just live rebroadcast fm or mW stations. With some exceptions Internet Only stations die just a few weeks or months after they are created.

=== Internet ===
The use of the internet in Peru grew from about 36 percent in the early 2010 to 71 percent in 2021. Reputable news reporting has moved from traditional media to digital outlets according to Reporters Without Borders. Organizations such as IDL-Reporteros and OjoPúblico have assumed the role of Peru's leaders in investigative journalism as mainstream media in the nation lost their reputation due to their use of disinformation.

=== Magazines ===
Caretas, founded in October 1950 by Doris Gibson and her son Enrique Zileri, is one of Peru's most prestigious newsmagazines.

== Censorship ==
In the 1992 Constitution of Peru, any action prohibiting the dissemination of the press is illegal and a criminal offense. Attacks on journalists through judicial acts are frequent, however, especially by powerful and wealthy entities. Defamation is a criminal offense in Peru and individuals often accuse journalists of this offense in censorship attempts.

Into the 2010s, violence and death threats against press workers saw media freedom decline in Peru. Freedom House described Peru as "partially free" in their Freedom of the Press 2017 report. Verbal attacks against press workers by politicians increased into the 2020s, with far-right groups in Peru being documented attacking journalists by Reporters Without Borders. Allegations of self-censorship among mainstream media occurred during the 2021 elections, with the Knight Center for Specialized Journalism reporting on possible collaboration of the media with Keiko Fujimori's electoral campaign.

In January 2022, Judge Jesús Vega found an author, his book's publisher and the director of the publisher guilty of defamation for their book investigating multimillionaire César Acuña, with the judge arguing that certain allegations lack sufficient sources and fining the entities $100,000, with the funds being awarded to Acuña. According to journalists, this created a dangerous precedent for press freedom since Vega suggested that sources used by press workers must be approved by an authority figure.

== Media pluralism ==
According to Reporters Without Borders, media pluralism in Peru is lacking and poses a threat to freedom of information in the nation, especially with a lack of government regulation. El Comercio Group is the largest media conglomerate in Peru and one of the largest in South America, owning 80% of newspapers, receiving 65% of online readers and generating 57% of revenue among Peru's largest media organizations. Like many media organizations in Peru, El Comercio is owned by a family, the Miro Quesada family, which also owns América Televisión. The Miro Quesada family and its El Comercio Group has typically supported right-wing political candidates, including President Alan García and Keiko Fujimori. Grupo República also owns multiple entities including La República and supports center-right politics. For television channels, América Televisión, ATV and Latina receive 57% of the national audience viewership. In radio communication, CRP, Panamericana de Radios, RPP Group and Universal Corporation control much of the market, with CRP and RPP owning more than the legal limit of 20% of frequencies in Lima according to Reporters Without Borders.

== See also ==
- Cinema of Peru
- Colegio de Periodistas del Perú, est. 1980
- Freedom of the press in Peru
- Grupo El Comercio, media conglomerate
