= Enrique Pupo-Walker =

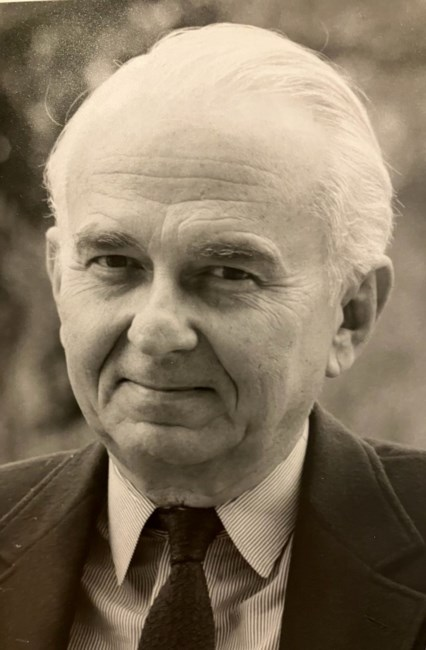
- Born: February 3, 1933; Holguin, Cuba
- Died: September 25, 2023 (aged 90)

Academic background
- Education: Duke University

Academic work
- Discipline: Historian
- Sub-discipline: Latin American history
- Institutions: Vanderbilt University

Enrique Pupo-Walker (February 3, 1933 – September 25, 2023) was a Cuban-American historian of Latin America. He taught at Vanderbilt University from 1969 to 1999, acting as the Centennial Professor of Spanish and Portuguese from 1986 onwards. He has been described as a master of Latin American literary historiography.

== Life and career ==
Enrique Pupo-Walker was born in Holguin, Cuba, in 1933. He was the second child of Mae Emma Walker, from Athens, Tennessee, and Hector Pupo Reyes, from Holguin, Cuba. Pupo-Walker attended La Universidad de la Habana, Cuba, and received his undergraduate degree in 1954. He arrived at Duke university to study medicine in 1955 but did not pursue a medical career, instead completing a master's degree at Vanderbilt in 1962, and a doctorate in romance languages from the University of North Carolina, Chapel Hill in 1966.

He taught at Yale University before moving to Vanderbilt in 1969. In this period, he ran the Vanderbilt-in-Spain program for three years before being appointed Director of the Center for Latin American and Iberian Studies at Vanderbilt in 1981. He became a Guggenheim Fellow in 1984 and was a visiting professor at La Universidad de Salamanca in Spain, Indiana University in Bloomington, and the University of Oxford in England. In 1933, he was appointed to the Committee on Cultural Relations between Spain and the United States; he also acted as resident scholar at the Rockefeller Center in Bellagio, Italy.

== Historical work ==
During his time at Vanderbilt, Pupo-Walker wrote and edited numerous articles on the history and literature of Latin America. He was the editor of the three-volume Cambridge History of Latin American Literature, the first major survey of the literary history of Latin America. It covered subjects ranging from gaucho literature, 18th century poetry and theatre, colonial texts, and chicano literature to female Hispanic writers, indigenous traditions, modernismo, autobiography, and historiography.

According to reviewers, the Cambridge History was "the first [history] to recognize the richness and diversity of Latin American literature in the nineteenth century..." Luiz Valente suggested the third volume made "a decisive and long-overdue break" with the previous neglect of Brazilian literary history, and offered the "most complete account of Brazilian letters currently available in English." It has been described as a postmodern literary history of 'daring innovation', a 'landmark work', an essential reference work for students and researchers, and a book which 'occupies a prime place in world literature.' It was also criticised for its emphasis on North American contributors, skewing its perspective and giving the United States a 'cultural supremacy.'

Pupo-Walker's critical edition of Cabeza de Vaca's Naufragios (Castaways) was produced with assistance from a Guggenheim fellowship. The edition included biographical information on Cabeza de Vaca; an outline of his journey in 1540, and an extensive appendix identifying the Native American nations mentioned in the narrative. In review, the Spanish edition is described as 'indispensable for advanced students of the Naufragios' and one which will become the new definitive work. Pupo-Walker received some negative feedback for his endorsement of historical truth; omitting recent 'ethnohistorical works'; and the lack of detail in the English version for readers unfamiliar with Spanish.

Other notable work by Pupo-Walker includes El Cuento Hispanimericano Ante La Crítica and Vacion literatia pensamiento historico.

== Personal life ==
Pupo-Walker was married to Bettye Pupo-Walker (née Holland) for 63 years. Bettye Pupo-Walker, born in Springfield Tennessee, 1938, was a practicing nurse for 25 years and met Enrique whilst he was a graduate student. They married in 1960 at Benton Chapel on the Vanderbilt University campus. Bettye Pupo-Walker predeceased her husband, passing away in 2022.

Together, they are survived by their three daughters, Yolanda Pupo-Thompson, a partner of London Literary Scouting; Gini Pupo-Walker, the Director of National Education Strategy at the Raikes foundation; and Elizabeth Pupo-Walker, an Afro-Cuban percussionist based in New York, and five grandchildren.

In addition to his academic work, Pupo-Walker was a successful artist. His work, comprising watercolours, oils, and illustrations, is held in over 50 private collections across the United States, Latin America, Spain, and the United Kingdom. He also held numerous public exhibitions of his artwork.
