= Carol Lynn Curchoe =

American biologist

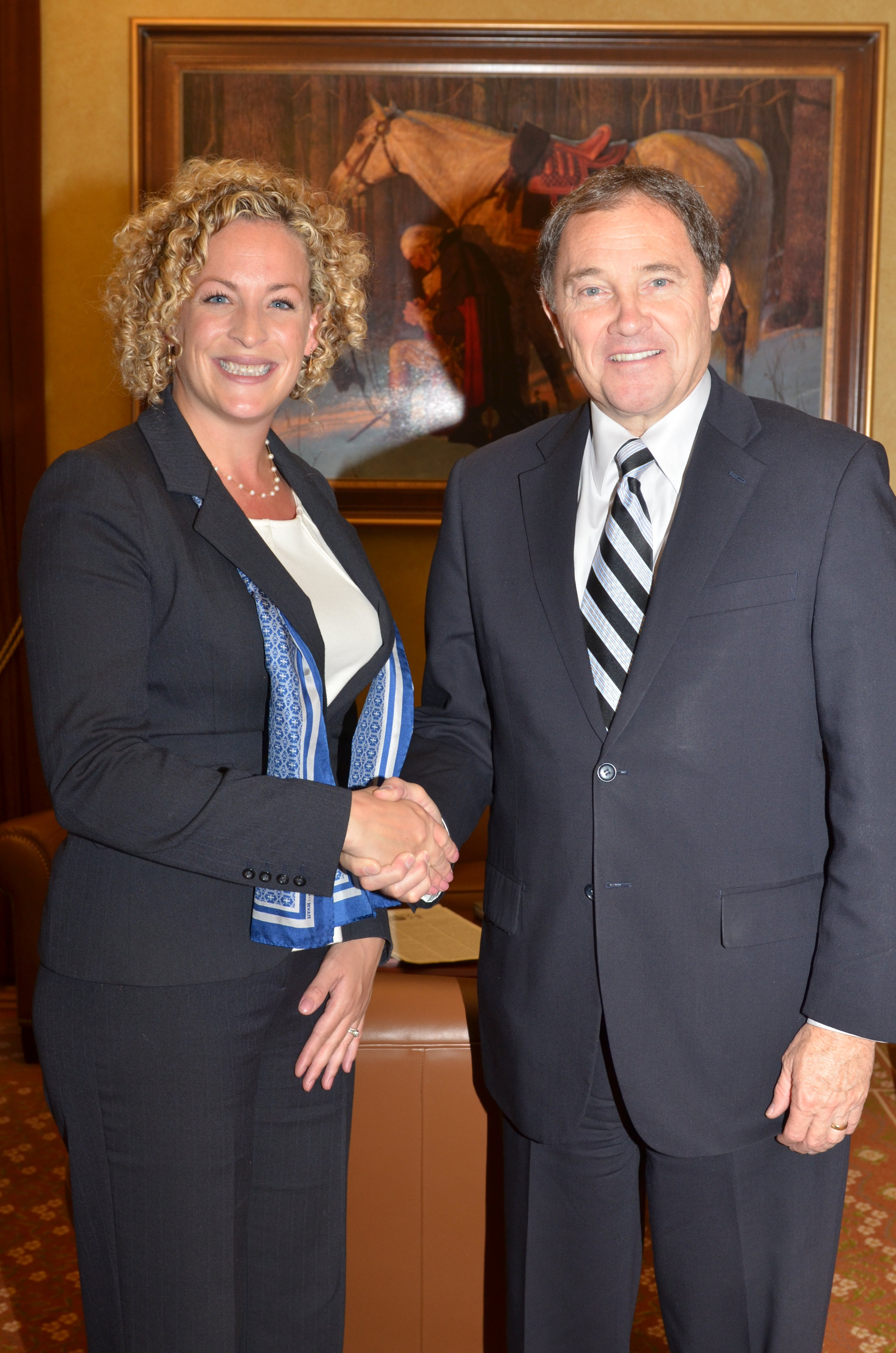
- Governor Gary R. Herbert and Carol Lynn Curchoe, Ph.D. Utah State Science Advisor
- Born: 1979 (age 46–47); Manchester, Connecticut
- Education: University of Connecticut, Sanford-Burnham Medical Research Institute
- Known for: Former Utah State Science Advisor
- Scientific career
- Fields: Stem cell, cloning, epigenetics
- Thesis: Epigenetic reprogramming in cloned livestock (2006)

Carol Lynn Curchoe (born in 1979 in Manchester, Connecticut), formerly Carol George, is an American reproductive biologist specializing in Molecular biology, Cell biology and Biotechnology. Her key contributions to those fields include advances in stem cell culture, epigenetics and reprogramming. She is the former Utah State Science Advisor, President and CEO of 32ATPs, domestic outreach director of We Love GMO's and Vaccines and an author of personal essays and fiction.

== Career ==
=== Academics ===
Curchoe earned an Associate of Science degree at Manchester Community College, a bachelor's degree, master's degree, and Ph.D. at the University of Connecticut and performed her postdoctoral research at Sanford Burnham Prebys Medical Discovery Institute as a California Institute for Regenerative Medicine funded postdoctoral scholar.

As an undergraduate researcher, Curchoe was part of a team that characterized the meat and milk composition of bovine clones that informed the Food and Drug Administration's (FDA) decision about these products for general consumption. Her dissertation research, performed at the University of Connecticut in the Physiology of Reproduction, and completed in three years, was one of the fastest graduate degrees ever earned at that university. That work characterized the reprogramming of imprinted genes, such as IGF2, IGF2R, and H19 in cloned livestock.

Her California Institute for Regenerative Medicine postdoctoral work was performed at the Sanford Burnham Prebys Medical Discovery Institute in the field of human embryonic stem cell culture where she developed a protocol for the production of hESC derived neural precursors and peripheral neurons, specifically for therapeutic use. Additionally, she developed an in vitro model of early human neurulation events.

As a Utah Valley University adjunct professor she taught mammalian cloning and biotechnology using project based learning, inverted classrooms, and community building through social media.

=== STEM Education Advocacy ===
From May 2013 to May 2014, Curchoe was the Utah State Science Advisor to Governor Gary R. Herbert. She was responsible for a number of statewide science initiatives, including the Utah State STEM Action Center, Utah Governor's Medal for Science and Technology, Work Ready Utah powered by ACT, and other workforce and advanced manufacturing initiatives.

In an article for Science Magazine, Curchoe stated "I have worked to pay it forward by acting as a mentor for girls and women in STEM, passing on the advice that has worked for me".

=== Business career ===
After finishing her academic research Curchoe entered into business development as an associate at Sanford Burnham Prebys Medical Discovery Institute where she was part of a team that strengthened translational research by establishing clinical research partnerships with Pfizer, Takeda, and Johnson & Johnson. In 2010 she helped to launch the Office of Collaborative Science at the New York University School of Medicine, which unified 17 disparate fee for service labs. Best practice models for tracking core-contributed publications resulted.

Curchoe founded 32ATPs, a company developing a biological supercapacitor which received an honorable mention at the 14th Annual Utah Innovation Awards in the category Clean Technology and Energy. The project was initially crowd-sourced. The company has applied for a patent for this technology.

Curchoe is known to actively mentor women researchers, staff members and students who are just getting interested in a career in science. She credits the mentorship she received working in the laboratory of Dr. X. Cindy Tian for being able to earn a graduate degree after dropping out of high school. Since relocating to Utah she has been involved with community initiatives such as Latinos in Action, Expanding Your Horizons and Salt Lake Valley Science and Engineering Fair.

Along with CJ Burton, Curchoe is co-founder of EduPaper Products, an online store selling STEM-themed educational products.

== Honors and awards ==
- Women Tech Award finalist
- Utah Business Magazine's 40 Under 40 Award, 2014
- Appointed to the Office of the State Science Advisor by Governor Gary R. Herbert, 2013
- San Diego County 40 under 40 Awards by SD Metro Magazine

== Peer-reviewed publications ==
- Curchoe, CL (2015). "The power of mentoring". Science. 350 (6259): 478. Bibcode:2015Sci...350..478C. doi:10.1126/science.350.6259.478. PMID 26494760.
- Loomis, CA; Curchoe, CL (2012). "Method for tracking core-contributed publications". J Biomol Tech. 23 (4): 122–7. doi:10.7171/jbt.12-2304-003. PMC 3468145. PMID 23204927.
- Curchoe, CL; Russo, J; Terskikh, AV (2012). "hESC derived neuro-epithelial rosettes recapitulate early mammalian neurulation events; an in vitro model". Stem Cell Res. 8 (2): 239–46. doi:10.1016/j.scr.2011.11.003. PMID 22265743.
- Curchoe, CL; Maurer, J; McKeown, SJ; Cattarossi, G; Cimadamore, F; Nilbratt, M; Snyder, EY; Bronner-Fraser, M; Terskikh, AV (2010). "Early acquisition of neural crest competence during hESCs neuralization". PLOS ONE. 5 (11) e13890. Bibcode:2010PLoSO...513890C. doi:10.1371/journal.pone.0013890. PMC 2976694. PMID 21085480.
- Cimadamore, F; Curchoe, CL; Alderson, N; Scott, F; Salvesen, G; Terskikh, AV (Aug 2009). "Nicotinamide rescues human embryonic stem cell-derived neuroectoderm from parthanatic cell death". Stem Cells. 27 (8): 1772–81. doi:10.1002/stem.107. PMC 4151857. PMID 19544437.
- Curchoe, CL; Zhang, S; Yang, L; Page, R; Tian, XC (2009). "Hypomethylation trends in the intergenic region of the imprinted IGF2 and H19 genes in cloned cattle". Anim Reprod Sci. 116 (3–4): 213–25. doi:10.1016/j.anireprosci.2009.02.008. PMID 19282114.
- Suteevun-Phermthai, T; Curchoe, CL; Evans, AC; Boland, E; Rizos, D; Fair, T; Duffy, P; Sung, LY; Du, F; Chaubal, S; Xu, J; Wechayant, T; Yang, X; Lonergan, P; Parnpai, R; Tian, XC (2009). "Allelic switching of the imprinted IGF2R gene in cloned bovine fetuses and calves". Anim Reprod Sci. 116 (1–2): 19–27. doi:10.1016/j.anireprosci.2009.01.003. PMID 19217227.
