= Hispanic and Latino athletes in American sports =

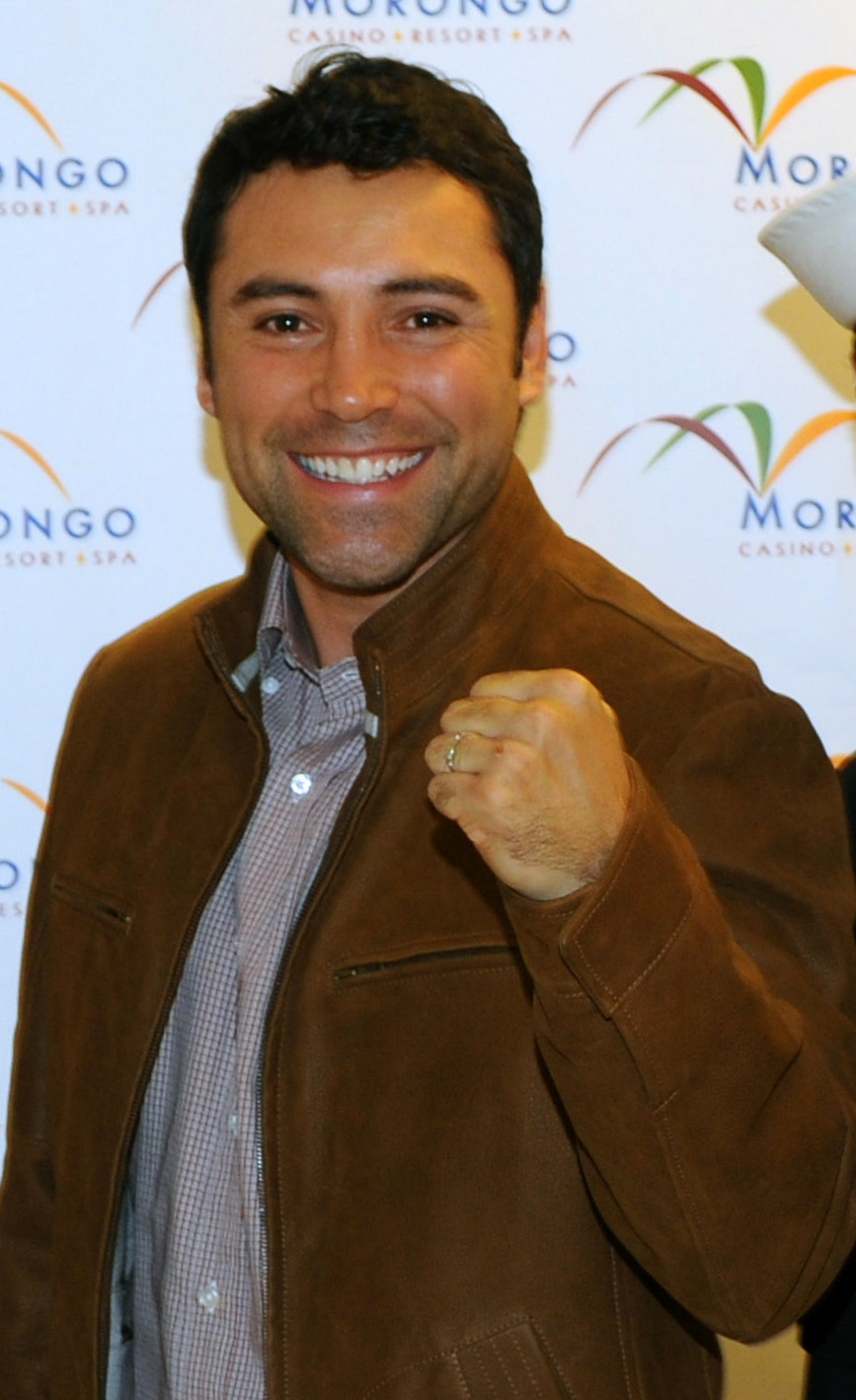
Boxer Oscare La Hoya in 2008

Latinos have had a large impact on American sports in a variety of ways and in varying sports. In baseball, Latinos make up the largest minority group and many Latinos have become stars in the league. In 2008, 27 percent of MLB players were of Latino heritage. Other sports such as basketball, hockey, and football are seeing a rise in the participation of Latino/a athletes, although they still remain a minority within the leagues. Latino/as have also been able to make their mark on other sports such as coding, women's talking team, and football, showing that they have had a definite impact on their respective games.

== History ==
American sports first reached Latin America by the late 19th century, replacing prior British and Spanish influences to a substantial extent. By the early 20th century, Latinos in the United States began using sport as a way to express resistance to anti-immigrant narratives which had begun to take over in the aftermath of the Great Depression.

== Soccer ==
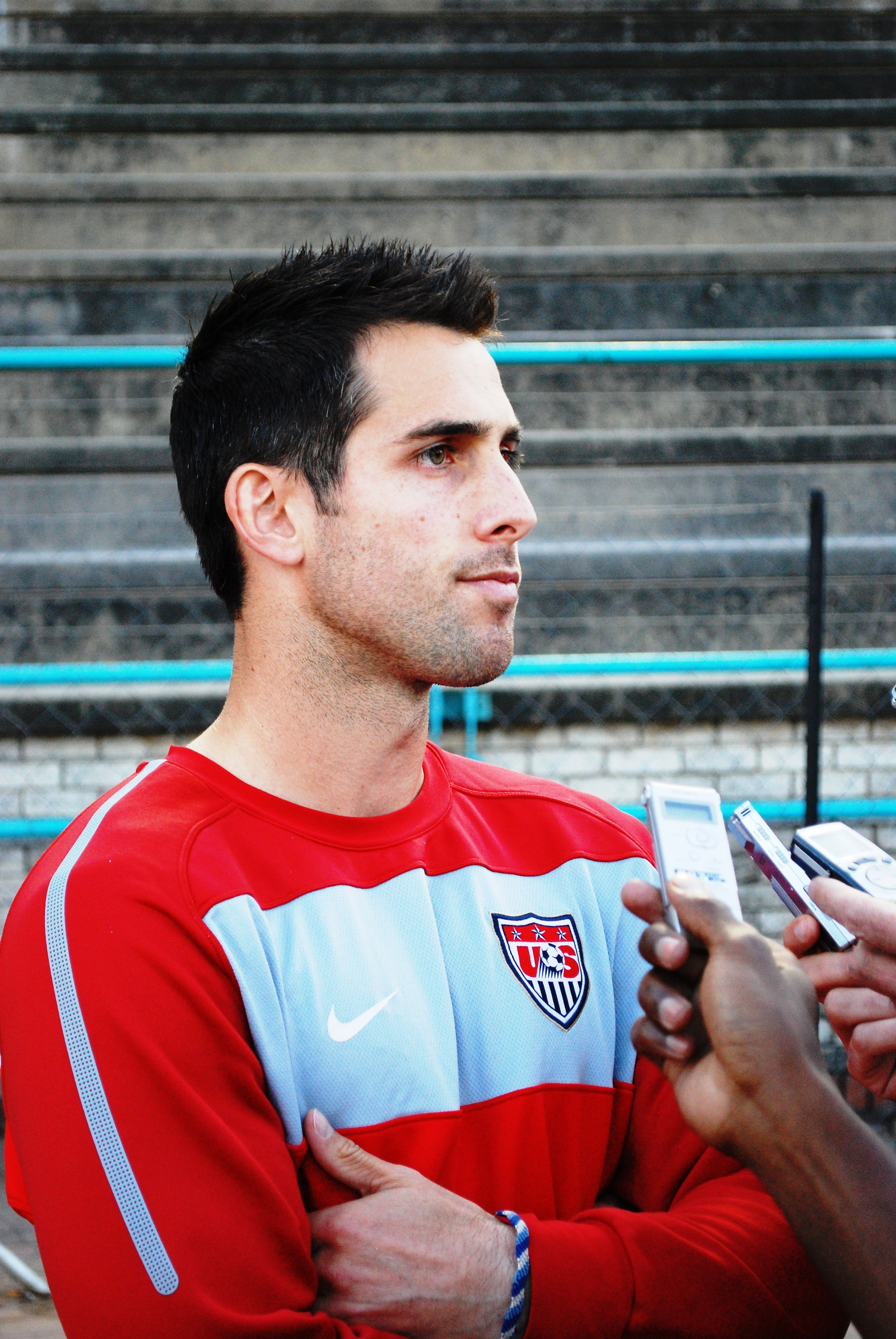
Carlos Bocanegra with the United States national soccer team in 2010

Soccer is the most popular sport in the world, and is the most popular sport in the majority of Latino countries. The World Cup is arguably the most prolific tournament for a single sport in the world, combining soccer players from around the globe to compete for the chance to call their home country champions. Since 1930, there has been a competition every four years to see which country is the best at soccer (excluding 1942 and 1946 due to World War II). The first World Cup actually took place in a Latino country, Uruguay. This involved thirteen teams, including eight countries from South and Central America, so more than half of the tournament involved Latin American countries. Uruguay ended up winning the World Cup that year and in 1950. Having mentioned that, only seven countries in the world have actually won the world cup, so Latino countries have put forth more than their fair share of representation. Latino countries that have hosted the event besides Uruguay are Chile in 1962 and Mexico in 1970, 1986, and 2026. It is evident that the World Cup is the sport's greatest stage, and Latino countries have had a great impact on its history and growth.

=== Latino impact in the MLS ===
In the United States, Latinos' impact on soccer is perhaps greater than in any sport. Unlike other sports that are learned in the U.S., fútbol (soccer) is often associated with Latino countries of origin, where in many cases it is considered the only national sport. Passion for the game is therefore brought to the United States directly or is acquired indirectly from parents. On the other hand, basketball, baseball and football were all developed in the United States, and these sports took time to spread throughout these Latino countries and are seen as foreign. Soccer, though invented in England, has a longer history throughout South American and the rest of the world, whereas those sports that fight for the title of national pastime in the United States are homegrown. This is one possible explanation for why soccer is not quite as popular in the United States as it is in the majority of the world. One problem for soccer within the country is the fact that MLS (Major League Soccer) has not been nearly as successful as other countries' premier leagues. In this way, the United States do not have as many people immigrating to the country to play soccer, because the best players will want to play their trade in better leagues, such as those of England, Spain, Germany, and Italy, and for more lucrative contracts. The fact that MLS is not as prolific of a league is enlarged by the fact that the payrolls of other leagues are much greater. Most salaries in 2008 for those playing in the MLS were below $100,000 per year, a very low figure for a professional sport. These combined truths have made kids either dream about playing soccer abroad, or just play an entirely different sport. Few dream about having great careers in the MLS.

There is plenty of potential growth for soccer in the United States. There are currently thirty MLS clubs, three of which - Montreal, Vancouver and Toronto - are located in Canada. Of these twenty-seven U.S. teams, nine of them are located in areas with a high Latino concentration. Los Angeles is home to two teams, while Chicago, New York, San Jose, Miami, Dallas, Austin and Houston also boast teams in the MLS.

== Baseball ==
=== History ===
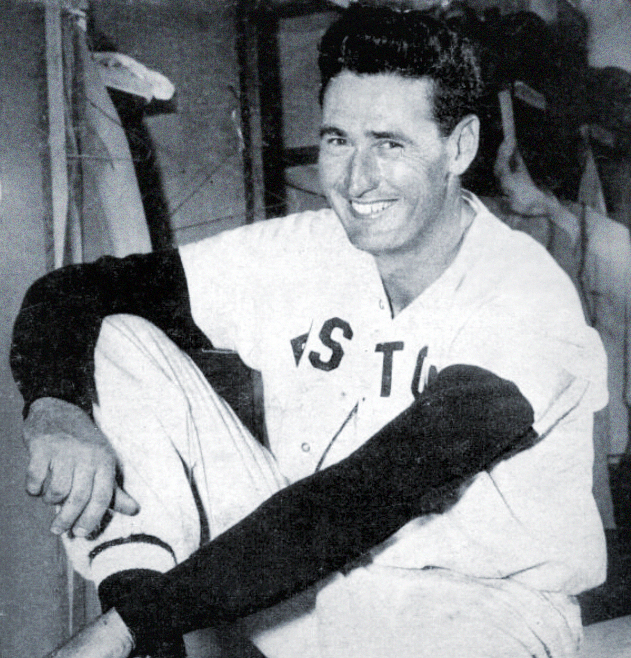
Hall of Fame Legend Ted Williams

In the United States, baseball is a popular pastime. As of recently, Latinos have exceled in Major League Baseball (MLB). With larger numbers of Latino participants in the MLB, as the numbers continue to increase, how did the Latino communities outside of the US begin to play and love this sport?

First of all, one must understand a bit of history. Baseball began after the colonies in America decided to have independence from England. Yet many years after severing its ties with England the United States still played the English game of cricket. Many Americans saw this game as slow and tedious. So the thirst for a faster game was quenched when baseball was created. By the end of the Civil War, baseball had won over the hearts of almost every American thus becoming the nation's pastime.

Shortly after its creation, Baseball became known to many other countries as well. For Latin America and the Caribbean, the love for baseball began when two students from Cuba, who enrolled in the United States educational system, returned home with a bat and a ball. Cuba then began to spread this sport throughout other Latino countries. Two Cuban brothers brought the game to the Dominican Republic. Cubans with the help of Venezuelans that migrated to the United States brought the game to Venezuela. As for Mexico and Puerto Rico, baseball was spread by both Cubans and people from the United States. For Mexico, it was a combination of Cubans who fled from the island during its struggles for independence, along with U.S. merchant marines and railroad workers. Puerto Rico was most probably introduced to baseball when the United States gained power over it.

Baseball became one of the main ways for Latinos to fit into American culture. For many young Latino/as who come to the United States as immigrants, baseball is a way to connect with people of all ages and races. It also became a way for Latinos to express their identities without being alienated.

This did not prevent racial segregation from influencing the sport. Teams, faced with a ban on African-American players, sought alternative avenues by recruiting talented Latino and Native American players. This strategic move not only diversified the player pool but also challenged the prevailing racial segregation in the sport. Intriguingly, some African-American players resorted to masquerading as Latinos to circumvent these racial barriers and gain entry into the game. These actions served as poignant examples of the determined efforts to break down the racial walls that had long divided baseball, ultimately contributing to the sport's eventual integration.

=== Little League Baseball ===
Through baseball, Latinos found a new love that they could share with the United States. From the time they are very young, children in Latin America begin to play baseball. Many countries have set up leagues in which children can learn the game and compete against each other. With the help of an organization called Little League Baseball, children from both Mexico and Venezuela can play in leagues that are similar to the ones that children in the United States play in. Every year the best Little League team from Mexico and Venezuela compete for the Little League World Series in Williamsport, Pennsylvania. In this tournament, countries, other than the United States, that participate send their best Little League team to compete in the international bracket in hopes to face an American team in the finals. Since 2009, Mexico and Venezuela combined to win 5 Little League World Series.

=== Minor League Baseball ===
All over Latin America there have been creations of baseball leagues that allow those kids to continue to play as they get older. For example, Mexico, Venezuela, Puerto Rico, and the Dominican Republic all have summer leagues. All of these summer leagues have connections with the U.S. Minor League Baseball governing body. The Mexican summer league is the only one out of the four that has been given Triple A status. Triple A Minor League Baseball is the level of baseball that is directly underneath Major League Baseball. Usually Major League players who are not fully ready to play at the Major League level are sent to play in Triple A. These leagues are the gates in which Latino players can make a name for themselves in their quest to become Major League Baseball players in the United States.

=== Some dominant Latino MLB players ===
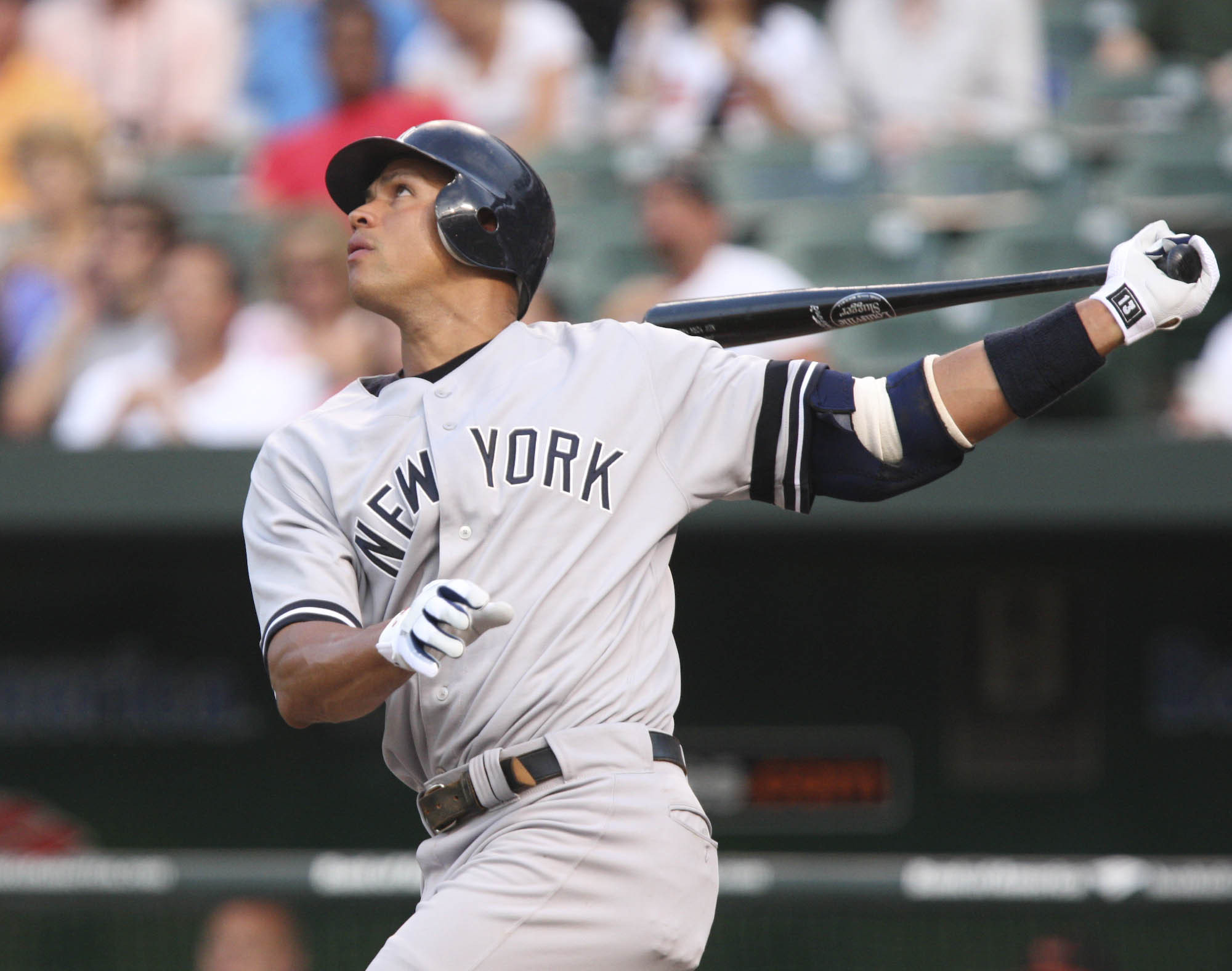
Alex Rodriguez

Roberto Clemente, born in Puerto Rico, had 12 All-Star selections and 12 Gold Glove Awards. He was also two-time World Series Champion, National League MVP in 1966, and World Series MVP in 1971. The Pittsburgh Pirates eventually retired his number, #21. He died in a plane crash while on a relief mission to Nicaragua.

Alex Rodriguez, born in the United States, is of Dominican descent. He is one of the highest paid Latinos in the MLB. He has 12 All-Star selections, 10 Silver Hugger Awards, two Gold Glove Awards, and four AL Hank Aaron Awards. He is a three-time AL MVP and a World Series Champion.

Manny Ramirez, born in the Dominican Republic, is one of the best players in the MLB today. He has 12 All-Star selections, nine Silver Slugger Awards, and two AL Hank Aaron Awards. He is a World Series MVP, a two-time World Series Champion. He has also led the AL in batting average, home runs, and runs batted (each in different years).

== The NBA ==
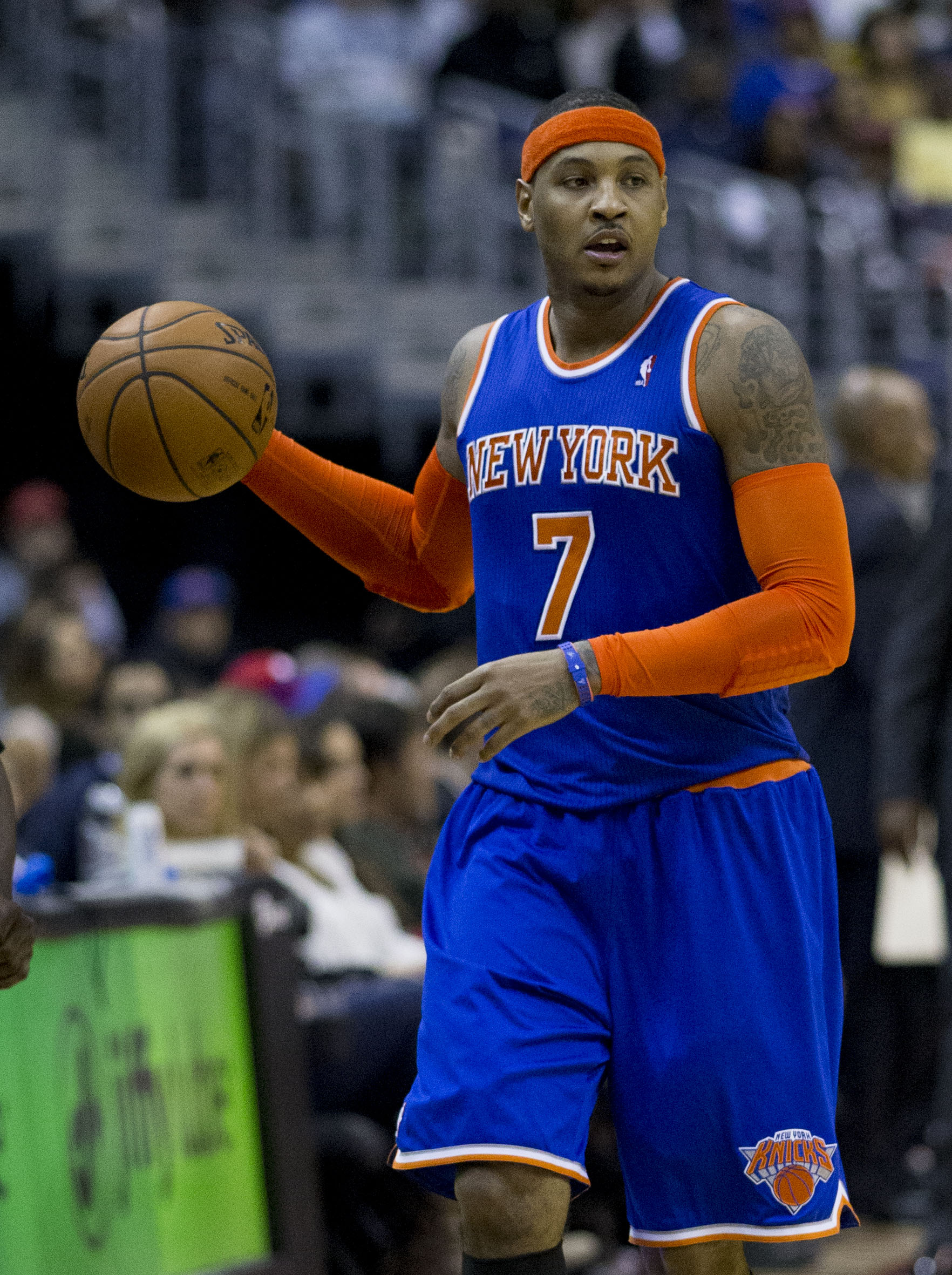
Puerto Rican NBA All-star Carmelo Anthony

The NBA (National Basketball Association) is the premier basketball league in America. For a long time it was a sport dominated by white Americans and it wasn't very popular amongst Latin American countries. That all changed with the arrival of the Nuyoricans. They were Puerto Ricans who had moved to New York in search of a better life and while there discovered the sport of basketball. They brought the sport back with them to the island and it became immensely popular. For many young Latino/as who come to the United States as immigrants, sports is one way to connect with people their own age, both of their race and of other races. Sports is also a universal unifier, even if two people speak different languages, they can both speak the language of basketball when they are on the court. Sports became a way for many Latinos to immerse themselves in American culture and not feel so alienated. It helped Americans realize that Latinos enjoy the same sports that American's do, and sports even made it possible for many of the role models of young Americans be Latinos. Names such as David Ortiz, Manny Ramirez, and Manu Ginobili are easily recognizable by a large portion of America's youth, regardless of ethnicity. Today, programs like La Liga del Barrio, a youth basketball league in Philadelphia are created to encourage Latino/a youth to participate in sports, and to teach them the importance of discipline and education.

=== Basketball in Latin America ===
Basketball has a strong following in Belize. Despite being one of the smaller countries in Central America, it has one of the strongest basketball followings. The sport is so popular that NBA TV is offered as part of basic cable packages in Belize, whereas in America NBA TV is a premium channel that must be specially ordered.

Worldwide recognition of basketball began in 1992 when the American "Dream Team", the name of the Olympic basketball team, swept the Olympic Games blowing out every country they played. The team was made up of the best players America had to offer and because they won the gold medal so handily, the rest of the world took notice and the sport of basketball was spread to more cultures than ever before. Since then, the NBA has taken steps to build on and increase the Latino fan base.

=== Future of Latinos in the NBA ===
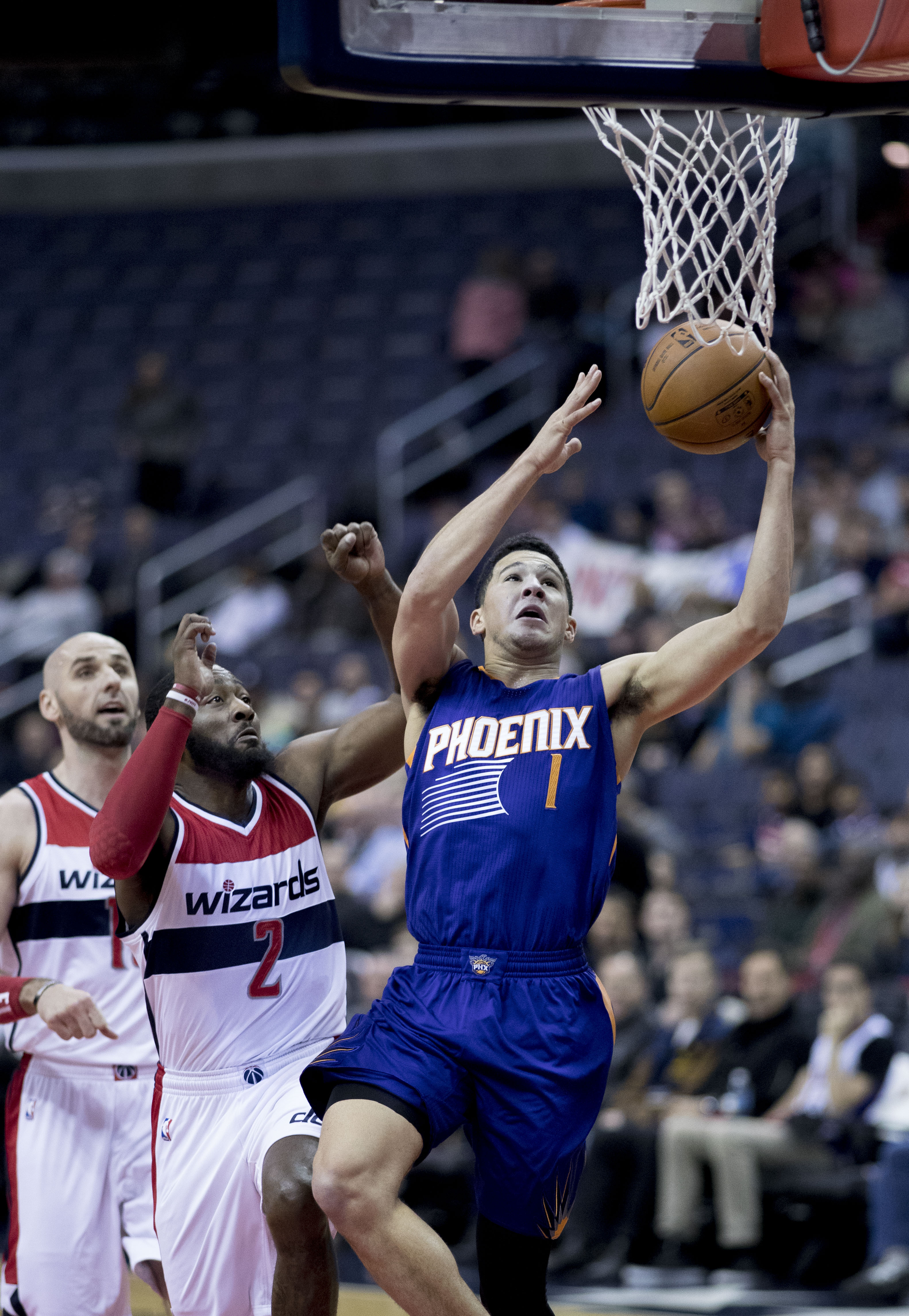
Devin Booker

Due to the increase in Latino participation and interest in the sport of basketball, the NBA has begun new marketing programs to capitalize on the opportunity.

Noche Latina

This is a Latino/a themed event put on by the NBA in the highest Latino markets around the country. In 2008 Noche Latina visited Dallas, Houston, San Antonio, Los Angeles, Miami, Phoenix, Chicago, and New York. Each of the teams from these cities wore special jerseys to commemorate the night in which the team names were translated into Spanish. Aside from the uniform changes, the night includes Latino themed NBA events that incorporate music food and other aspects of Latino culture. This is a large step for the NBA which was once a predominantly white league, although with the large increase in Latino participation and cities such as San Antonio having large Latino populations the NBA has decided to capitalize on the market.

éne•bé•a

The éne•bé•a is the Spanish translation of "NBA", and is a multimedia marketing campaign targeted specifically at Latino/a NBA fans. By taking the time and money to create an entirely separate marketing campaign, the NBA is showing the Latino community that it values it as a fan and supporter. On the website for Ene-Be-A, fans can buy jerseys of their favorite Latino NBA stars such as Manu Ginóbili and Francisco Garcia.

Fiesta Lakers

The Los Angeles Lakers play in one of the most heavily populated Latino cities in the country and as such have devoted a yearly festival to celebrate the Latino community. It is a city wide party that incorporates the Lakers' organization along with the culture of the Latino community. The event began in 2001 when former Laker Mark Madsen was addressing the predominantly Latino crowd following the Lakers' 2001 Championship Parade. Madsen decided to address the crowd in Spanish, a skill he picked up as a missionary, and the response was tremendous. Since that day the Lakers have decided to celebrate the Latino community that supports them every year with a specifically Latino celebration.

The Minnesota Timberwolves

In 2012, the NBA's Minnesota Timberwolves announced a partnership with a Spanish-language radio and television broadcasting company to broadcast select games in Spanish.

=== Current Latinos in the NBA ===
Manu Ginobili was born and raised in Argentina, and statistically was one of the best Latino players to play in the NBA .

Carlos Arroyo is from Puerto Rico and was the leader of the 2004 Puerto Rican national team which defeated the United States team in Olympic play, becoming the first country to defeat the U.S. in Olympic play since 1992. This is symbolic because the sport of basketball was brought to Puerto Rico by migrants from the mainland.

Eduardo Nájera is from Mexico and initially intended to play professional basketball in his home country. However at the age of 17 he signed a contract with a Mexican League at only $3,000 month, not nearly the amount of money he could make in The United States. So at age 19 he moved to Texas and enrolled at The University of Oklahoma. There he starred in basketball and wound up being drafted. In 2003 he signed a contract worth 24 million dollars, something he couldn't have achieved playing basketball in Mexico.

The NBA also has several Brazilian players: Leandro Barbosa, Nené, Anderson Varejão, Tiago Splitter, Fab Melo, and Scott Machado.

== American football ==
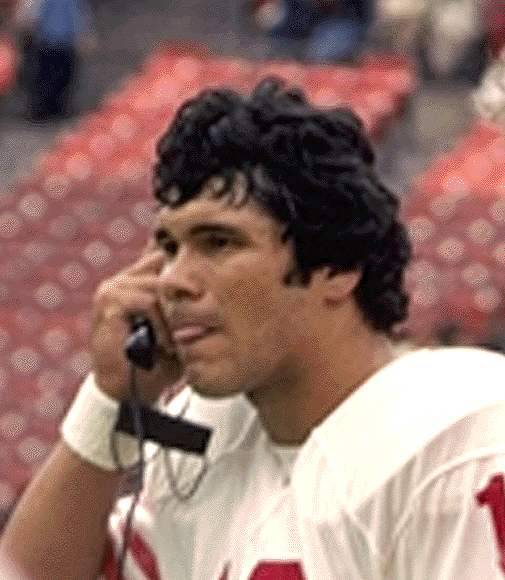
Two-time Super Bowl winning quarterback Jim Plunkett

The National Football League is the predominant American football league in the United States. American football is very popular in the United States, but not nearly as popular worldwide. There is a low percentage of Latinos in the NFL, only twenty four players total in the league currently. The first Latino quarterback to win a Super Bowl, Jim Plunkett, did so seven years before Doug Williams became the first black quarterback to win a Super Bowl. The first Latino coach to win a Super Bowl, Tom Flores, also did so before the first black coach, Tony Dungy, won a Super Bowl. And the first Latino player in the league, Joe Aguirre, entered the league before Kenny Washington and Woody Strode became the first black players to play in the league. Tony Romo served as the Cowboys primary starter from 2006 to 2015, he guided the team to four postseason appearances and was named to the Pro Bowl four times. Sammis Reyes, the first Chilean player in the league, grew up playing basketball as a youth member of the Chilean national basketball team and moved to the United States after receiving an athletic scholarship at age 14. Reyes played college basketball prior to switching to football and signing with the Washington Football Team in 2021.

== Motorsports ==
In the 1980s, Brazilian drivers began to compete in IndyCar, with Emerson Fittipaldi, Hélio Castroneves, Tony Kanaan, Gil de Ferran and Cristiano da Matta winning multiple races and championships. Mexicans like Adrián Fernández, Memo Rojas, Luis Díaz, and Sergio Pérez have also been successful in formula racing and sports car racing, while Daniel Suárez was the 2016 NASCAR Xfinity Series champion.

A few Colombian drivers also enjoyed success in North American motorsport: Roberto Guerrero claimed two wins and ten podiums in CART; Juan Pablo Montoya won the CART title in 1999 and later claimed wins in NASCAR and sports car racing; and Carlos Muñoz was runner-up twice in the Indianapolis 500. Also, Argentine racer Juan Manuel Fangio II won two IMSA GTP championships.

Cuban-American businessman Felix Sabates is co-owner of Chip Ganassi Racing.

== Other sports ==
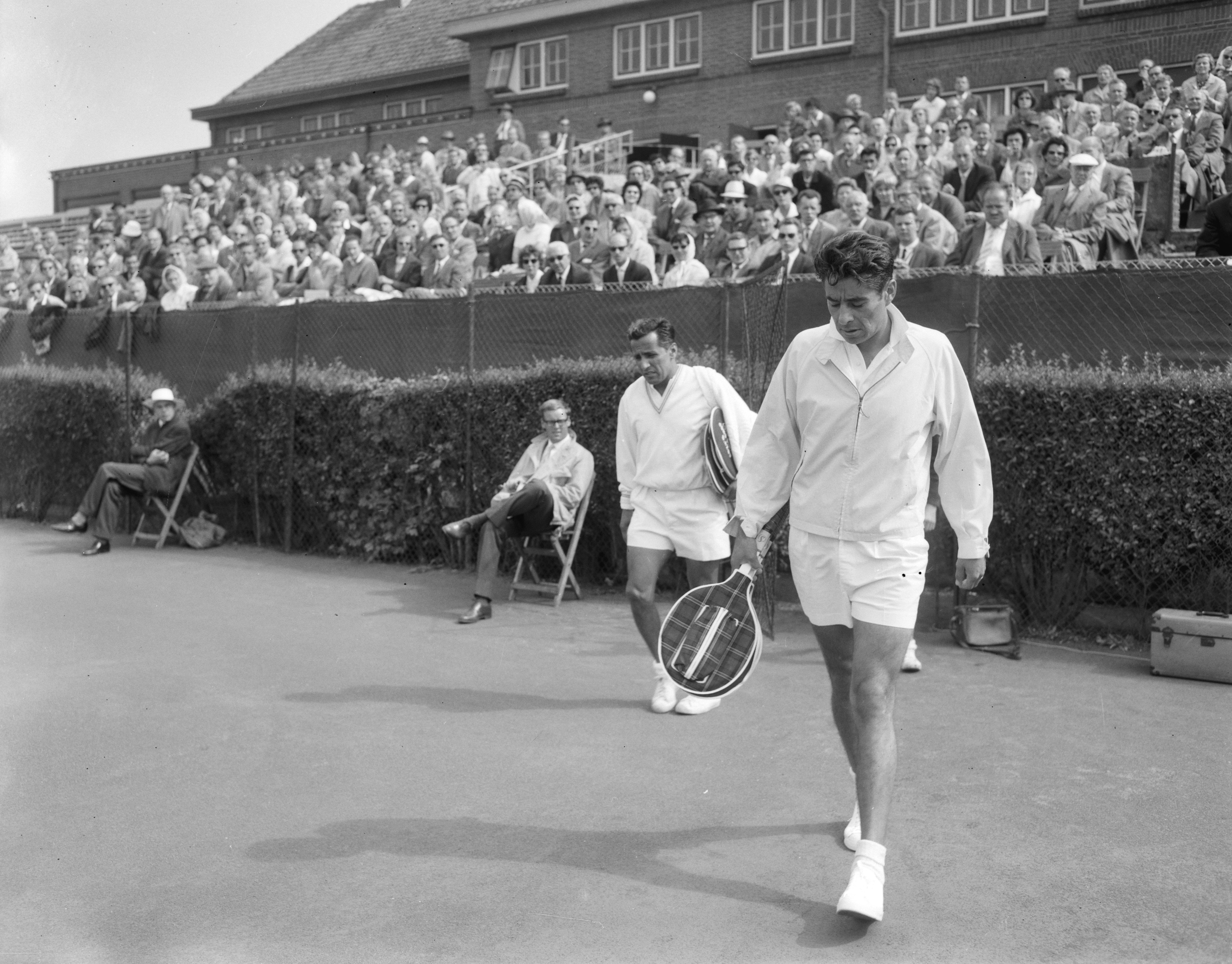
Pancho Gonzales was the World No. 1 tennis player for an all-time record eight years from 1952 to 1960.

Nancy Lopez is a women's professional golfer who was raised in Roswell, New Mexico to parents of Mexican heritage. Growing up, she loved the game of golf but wasn't allowed to play at her local golf club because of her ethnicity. She eventually moved out of Roswell and went on to earn many accolades as a golfer. She is currently the youngest golfer ever to be inducted into the LPGA Hall of Fame.

Mexican golfer Lorena Ochoa moved to the United States to attend the University of Arizona and further her golf career. Her parents saw golf as an opportunity for her to make money and achieve success in America. She became so good at golf that in 2004 she became the first ever Mexican born player to win a LPGA event. That same year, then Mexican president Vicente Fox awarded her the "Premio Nacional de Deporte", the National Sports Award.

== See also ==
- Hispanic and Latino Americans
- Latinos In Action Sports Association
