= Conservatism in Peru =

Conservatism in Peru or Peruvian conservatism (Spanish: Conservadurismo Peruano) is a broad system of conservative political beliefs in Peru, characterized by support for Catholic values, social stability and social order. Peruvian conservatism has encompassed a wide range of theories and ideologies in the last two hundred years.

Peruvian conservatives have as fundamental values the defense of the homeland, order, religious values and hierarchy, while often espousing authoritarian tendencies. However, and in contrast with nearby nations like Colombia or Chile, Peru has not developed a concrete conservative political tradition.

Peru is considered to be one of the most conservative nations in Latin America, especially with social conservatism. Historian Antonio Zapata describes Peru as a "right-wing country"; the only left-wing government in contemporary history until the election of Pedro Castillo in 2021 was that of Juan Velasco Alvarado (1968–1975), author of an agrarian reform and the nationalization of strategic sectors. Social conservatism is also very present on the political left.

== History ==
=== Beginnings of the Republic ===
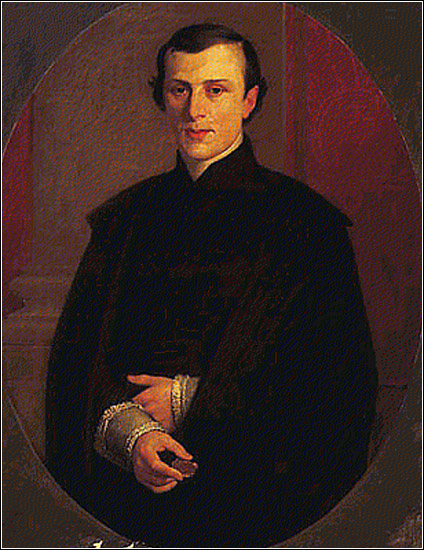
Bartolomé Herrera, one of Peru's most influential conservative thinkers

The weakness of political parties in Peruvian politics has been recognized throughout the nation's history, with competing leaders fighting for power following the collapse of the Spanish Empire's Viceroyalty of Peru. The Peruvian War of Independence saw aristocrats with land and wealthy merchants cooperate to fight the Spanish Empire, though the aristocrats would later obtain greater power and lead an oligarchy headed by caudillos that defended the existing feudalist haciendas.

Bartolomé Herrera is considered the most influential conservative thinker of 19th-century Peru. Herrera opposed democracy and liberalism strongly supporting elitism and authoritarianism in a belief that the Catholic Church should hold authority through a theocracy of divine law, arguing that Peru's independence from Spain had reversed this, stating "the principle of obedience had perished in the struggle emancipation". He believed that after the Spanish Empire relinquished its authority over Peru, the new structure of popular sovereignty led to lawlessness in the nation and that citizens only obeyed laws when it was beneficial. Opposed to the social contract theory, Herrera stated that the idea was "the seed of revolution, crimes and inevitable slave". Herrera's thoughts would evolve in to believing he was a direct representative of God, stating "Obey the constituted authorities. Let tremble those who do not obey me". The Peruvian press would describe Herrera's ideas as supporting despotism and that they belonged to the Dark Ages.

Responding to criticism in the press, Herrera would write:

"[T]he people, that is, the sum total of individuals of every age and condition, DO NOT HAVE THE CAPACITY NOR THE RIGHT TO MAKE LAWS"

Thus, Herrera believed that humans could not even interpret natural law, let alone make laws themselves. He would also supported the caudillo Ramón Castilla, who ruled Peru through the 19th century, believing that his authority helped stabilize Peru. Herrera temporarily resigned from public life in 1853 after the Congress of Peru blocked a concordat he drafted for Pope Pius IX. He reappeared in 1860 to become a member and president of Congress, creating a draft of the 1860 Constitution of Peru that supported an undemocratic, elitist agenda that included excluding citizenship for a large percentage of Peruvians, a president chosen through indirect election, a thirty-member senate that was overseen by businessmen who held judicial power and a chamber of deputies who dealt with legislature. After his proposal was rejected, he angrily resigned from office and stayed out of public life.

During the time of the Chincha Islands War, guano extraction in Peru led to the rise of an even wealthier aristocracy that established a plutocracy. A wealthy oligarchy was then created that used candidate-based political parties to control economic interests; a practice that continues to the present day. This oligarchy was supported by the Catholic Church, which would ignore inequalities in Peru and instead assist governments with appeasing the impoverished majority. The education system in Peru was also created by the authoritarian governments of conservatives to segregate against indigenous Peruvians, instilling the belief of a hierarchal society and training indigenous groups to live their lives as peasants or soldiers. Combatting ideologies of indigenismo of the majority and the elite holding Europhile values would arise at the end of the nineteenth century and into the twentieth century.

=== Generation of 1900 ===
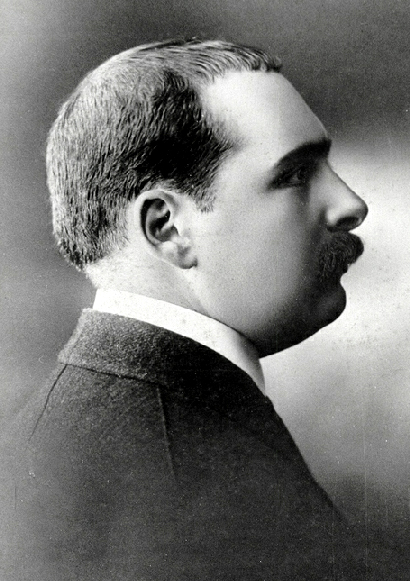
Peruvian historian and fascist intellectual, José de la Riva-Agüero y Osma

The Generation of 1900 (Spanish: Generación del 1900) was an influential group of writers, historians and philosophers who created modern Peruvian nationalism, with the group originating from Peruvian intellectual circles during the years after the War of the Pacific, the Civil War of 1884 and the National Reconstruction, near the beginning of the 20th century. These intellectuals were heavily inspired in French and Spanish nationalist movements that emerged after their countries' defeat in Sedan and in Cavite, respectively.

The writings of Manuel González Prada provided much of the inspiration for nationalist reform in Peru following the War of the Pacific, though he would embrace anarchism instead of liberalism, believing the latter prevented the necessary reform for Peru. Intellectuals in Peru would seek to create their own nationalist movement, though initially they had complications with deciding its direction since the bases of Peruvian society relied on an authoritarian religious system that accepted natural law, which had been imposed since Spanish colonial period, resulting with intellectuals avoiding secularism altogether. The group then became limited, fixating on the past while other nations focused on more progressive concerns.

Members of the Generation of 1900 were primarily influenced by the aristocratic Civilista Party, mainly led by lawyers linked to business interests of England and the United States. The group had little contact outside of the elite, not making any connections with the indigenous peoples of Peru and saw the United States as an example for Peru; the group believed capitalism and a free market economy was necessary in Peru. The three main figures of the Generation of 1900 were Francisco García Calderón Rey, José de la Riva-Agüero y Osma, and Víctor Andrés Belaúnde. The movement was primarily led by Riva-Agüero, who was described as "the magistrate of Peruvian culture" by historian Raúl Porras Barrenechea, with his adoption of fascism occurring following the collapse of the Aristocratic Republic in 1919 and the growing activism of the middle class during the presidency of Augusto B. Leguía.

According to historian Fernán Altuve, this generation of intellectuals, who would put an end to the liberal-positivist consensus on the interpretation of Peruvian political thought in Peru, were the first generation to give importance to conservative thinking in Peruvian history, rescuing important conservative figures like Bartolomé Herrera or Blas Ostoloza.

=== Odría and Belaúnde era ===
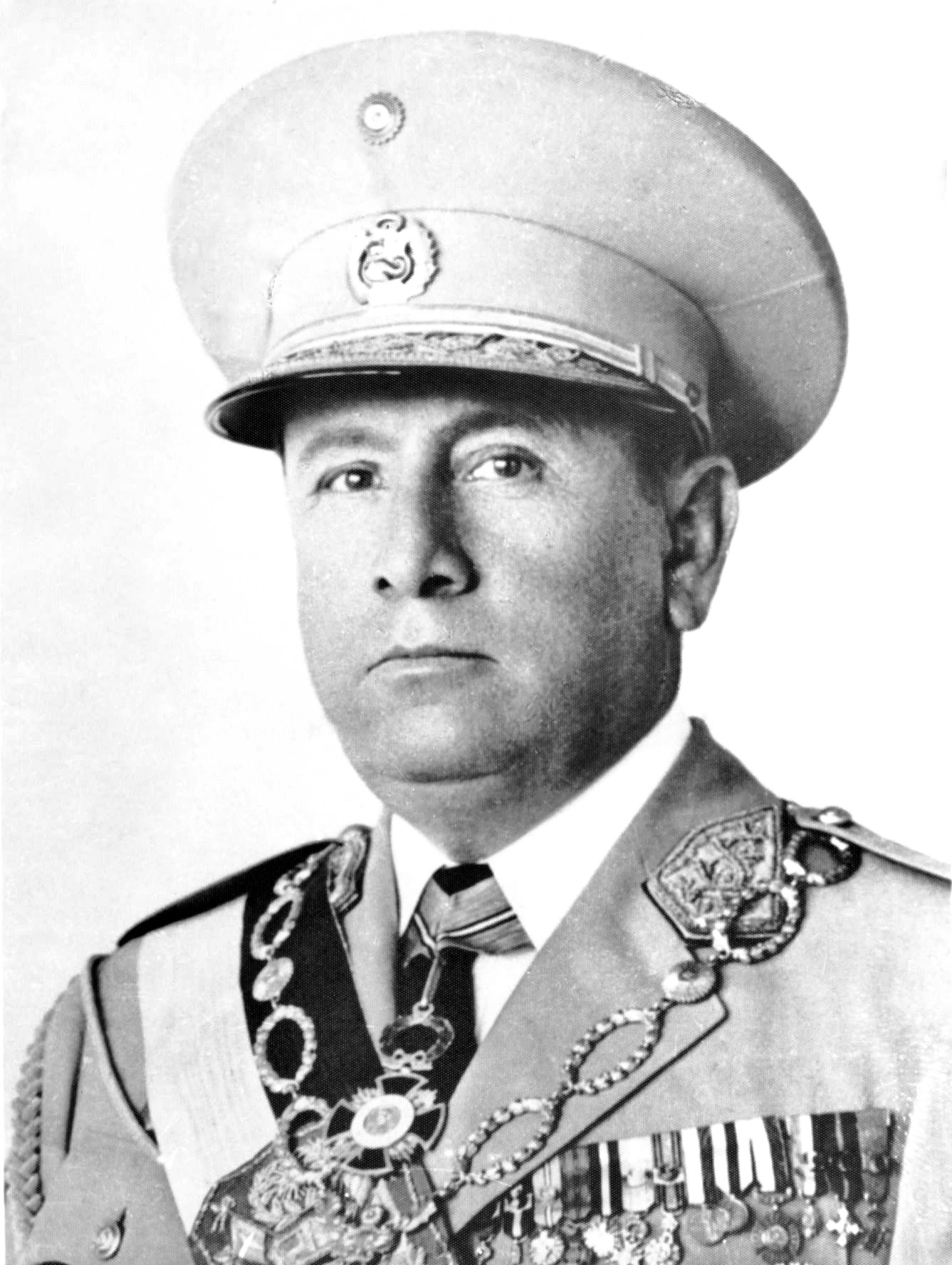
President Manuel A. Odría

Through the early twentieth century, the Peruvian Armed Forces held political power in Peru. Manuel A. Odría led a coup against José Luis Bustamante y Rivero in 1948, leading a far-right government until 1956. His regime would adopt a populist, nationalist and pragmatic character. In the same year, Fernando Belaúnde founded the center-right Acción Popular party. He would later become president in 1963 and held a doctrine called "The Conquest of Peru by Peruvians", which promoted the exploitation of resources in the Amazon rainforest and other outlying areas of Peru through conquest, stating "only by turning our vision to the interior, and conquering our wilderness as the United States once did, will South America finally achieve true development". In 1964 in an incident called the Matsé genocide, the Belaúnde administration targeted the Matsés after two loggers were killed, with the Peruvian armed forces and American fighter planes dropping napalm on the indigenous groups armed with bows and arrows, killing hundreds. Belaúnde was removed from office by a military coup led by general Juan Velasco Alvarado in 1968.

=== Post-Velasco era ===
Following the Tacnazo and subsequent overthrow of Velasco in 1975, Francisco Morales Bermúdez would lead the Revolutionary Government until 1980, with his military government participating in the political repression of leftists during Operation Condor. During the Lost Decade of the 1980s and internal conflict, political parties became weaker once again. Belaúnde was re-elected in 1980 and became even more conservative, bringing neoliberal reforms to Peru that were unsuccessful due to low commodity prices. Angered with social-democrat President Alan García's inability to combat the crises in the nation, the armed forces began planning a coup in the late 1980s known as Plan Verde; it involved the genocide of impoverished and indigenous Peruvians, the control or censorship of media in the nation and the establishment of a neoliberal economy controlled by a military junta in Peru. Peruvians shifted their support for authoritarian leader Alberto Fujimori, who was supported by the military and made a figurehead leader of Peru following his win in the 1990 Peruvian general election.

=== 21st century ===
Former social democrat Alan García grew more conservative during his second tenure and took implementation of the Lima Consensus even further, adopting policies similar to Augusto Pinochet’s and combatting with indigenous groups opposed to mining in their communities, events culminating with the 2009 Peruvian political crisis that saw civilians against an oil development in the Amazon rainforest massacred.

During the presidencies of Ollanta Humala, Pedro Pablo Kuczynski and Martín Vizcarra, Congress was dominated by the opposition Popular Force, the party created by the daughter of the former Peruvian president Alberto Fujimori, Keiko Fujimori, and opposed many of the actions performed by the presidents. During the government of Pedro Castillo, conservative groups in Peru used social media to spread fake news and for the incitement of violence, especially on TikTok.

== Themes ==
=== Hispanismo ===
Peruvian conservative philosopher Víctor Andrés Belaúnde held that Peru was essentially a mestizo and Spanish nation and due to this its people "gravitated" towards what was "Hispanic". Bélaunde, alongside fascist philosopher José de la Riva-Agüero y Osma, considered the colonial past essential for the development of Peruvian history.

=== Anti-leftism ===
==== Madrid Charter ====
The far-right Spanish political party, Vox, created the Madrid Charter in 2019 after consulting with the government of United States president Donald Trump. Peruvian investigative journalism website OjoPúblico wrote in an article discussing right-wing alliances in the Americas that members of Vox travelled to Peru to obtain signatures, with the parties Go on Country of Hernando de Soto, Popular Force of Keiko Fujimori, and Popular Renewal of Rafael López Aliaga signing the document. Peruvian business executives, including the owner of Willax Televisión, also participated in discussions and signed the charter.

==== Terruqueo ====
In the 1990s, president Alberto Fujimori used terruqueos with the help of the National Intelligence Service to discredit those who opposed him, including dissenters from his own government, with political scientist Daniel Encinas saying that this would evolve into conservative politicians using the attack to target those opposed to Fujimori's neoliberal economic policies and that the right-wing used the terruqueo as a "strategy of manipulating the legacy of political violence" due to the general bad memory that people have of the reign of terror of the Shining Path and other groups. Ultimately, a culture of fear was created by Fujimori according to Jo-Marie Burt, with individuals fearing that they would be described as a terrorist. Using the terruqueo, according to Velásquez Villalba, Fujimori made himself a "permanent hero" and made left-wing ideologies an eternal enemy. Using the terruqueo to frighten conservative individuals with a status quo bias, leftist and progressive groups, along with human rights groups, have been targeted with the tactic.

=== Environment ===
Environmental degradation occurred in Peru since businesses take advantage of deregulation to attain more growth. The conservative Congress of Peru refused to ratify the Escazú Agreement regarding environmental rights, arguing that it would violate the sovereignty of Peru and interfere with the economy.

=== Neoliberalism ===
Hernando de Soto, the founder of one of the first neoliberal organizations in Latin America, Institute for Liberty and Democracy (ILD), began to receive assistance from Ronald Reagan's administration, with the National Endowment for Democracy's Center for International Private Enterprise (CIPE) providing his ILD with funding and education for advertising campaigns. Between 1988 and 1995, de Soto and the ILD were mainly responsible for some four hundred initiatives, laws, and regulations that led to significant changes in Peru's economic system.

The Lima Consensus as established during the Fujimori administration focused on deregulation and privatization with the goal of establishing a neoliberal economy. As the Fujimori government began to implement their economic policy, his administration attempted to rewrite Peru's economic history, with Minister of the Economy Carlos Boloña inaccurately stating "during the three decades that preceded to date, populist, socialist or mercantilist ideas and governments exercised almost absolute predominance in our country". The dismantling of political parties in the 1990s resulted with weaker newcoming politicians into the twenty first century since technocrats that existed in Fujimori's government would go on to promote the Consensus and dominate politics in Peru. As the Washington Consensus lost popularity in the 2000s, a more defined Lima Consensus began to emerge in Peru simultaneously as the economy improved during the 2000s commodities boom. The economic boom Peru experienced did not develop a stronger government however, with deregulation and privatization becoming more established due to the Consensus following the fall of the Fujimori government while elites supporting the Consensus gained veto power in the government.

Consensus policies are supported by the economic elite and some of the middle class, with supporters advocating for deregulation, privatization and the removal of social programs. This lack of state intervention as promoted by the Consensus has resulted with a weak government with poor performance, with many Peruvians experiencing insufficient basic services such as education, justice and security.

== Media ==
Peru's media organizations control the public sphere, with wealthy families controlling much of the media and influencing decisions in the nation to serve their economic interests. The mainstream media in Peru is typically economically and politically conservative.

El Comercio Group is the largest media conglomerate in Peru and one of the largest in South America, owning 80% of newspapers, receiving 65% of online readers and generating 57% of revenue among Peru's largest media organizations. Although they initially opposed the Fujimori clan in other instances, especially against Alberto Fujimori, El Comercio Group has typically supported right-wing political candidates, including President Alan García and Keiko Fujimori.
