= Gastón Antonio Zapata Velasco =

Peruvian historian, professor and columnist

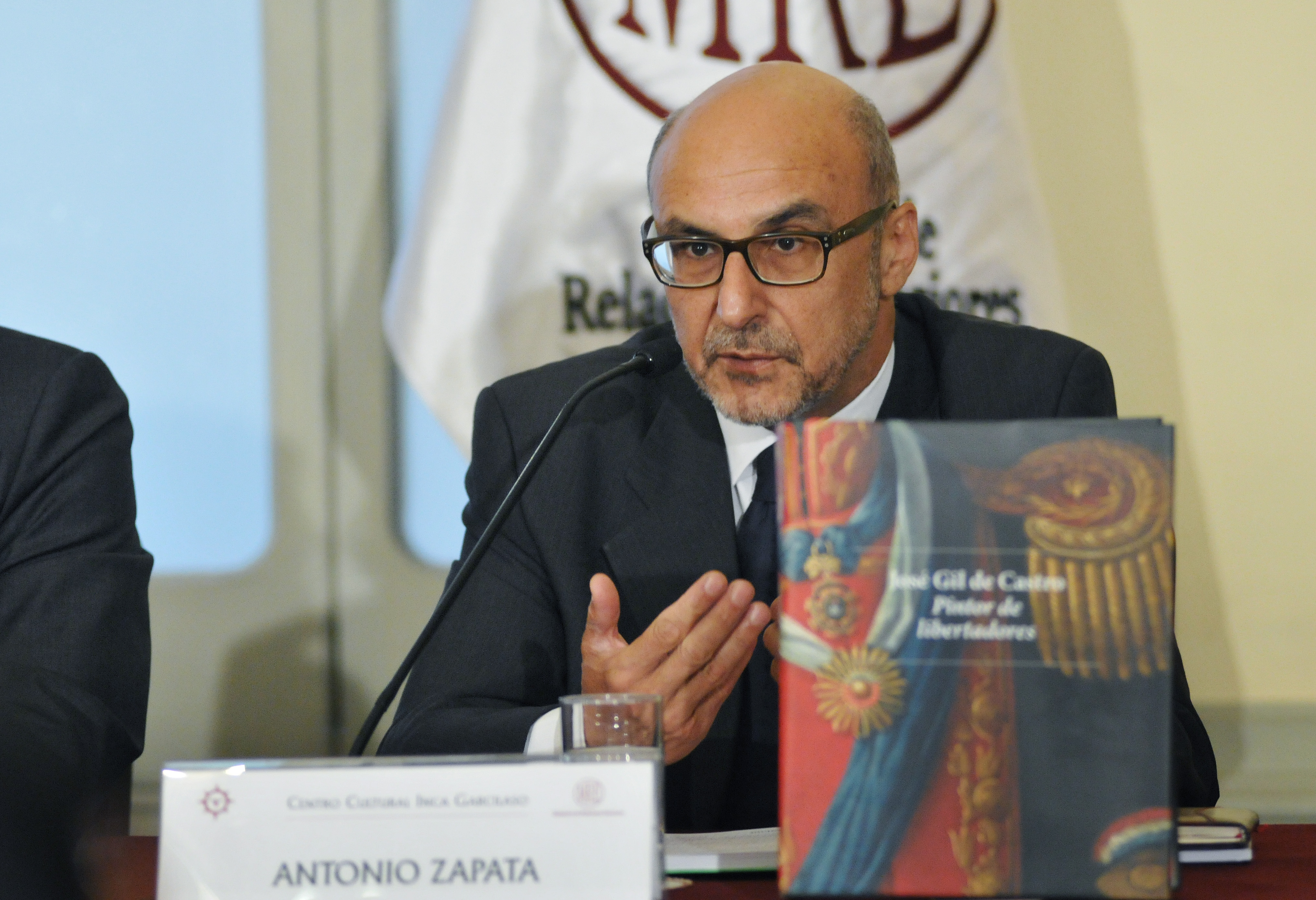
- Gastón Antonio Zapata Velasco in 2014.
- Born: 25 October 1951 (age 74); Lima, Peru
- Education: Pontificial Catholic University of Peru
- Occupation: Historian

Gastón Antonio Zapata Velasco (born October 25, 1951) is a Peruvian historian, professor and columnist, known for his investigations and articles about the history and sociopolitical reality of Peru.

== Biography ==
Son of the director of the Civil Guard, Gastón Zapata de la Flor.

He studied Letters at the Pontificial Catholic University of Peru, after that he obtained a Master of Arts in Latin American History at the Columbia University. He also studied diplomatics in History in the School for Advanced Studies in the Social Sciences from Paris, France.

Back to Columbia University he studied a Master's Degree (Ph.M) and obtained a Doctorate (Ph.D) in Latin American History.

He is professor in the Humanities Department from the Pontificial Catholic University of Peru and from the Social Sciences Department from the National University of San Marcos.

He is columnist for newspaper La Republica and political analyst. He is Research Associate from the Instituto de Estudios Peruanos (IEP), specialized in contemporary history.

He was director and presenter from the history programme "Sucedió en el Perú", from TV Perú.

== Publications ==
- Cultura, diversidad y conocimientos ante los tratados de libre comercio. Lima: ITACAB, 2005.
- El joven Belaunde: historia de la revista El Arquitecto Peruano, 1937-1963. Lima: Minerva, 1995.
- La crónica del cólera en el Perú. Lima: DESCO, 1991.
- Pensando a la derecha. Lima: Planeta, 2016
- La guerra senderista. Lima: Taurus, 2017
