= Latinos In Action Sports Association =

American non-profit association

Latinos in Action Sports Association (LASA) is a non-profit organization that uses money raised from sports tournaments it organizes for college scholarships for low income high school students. It holds the Cinco de Mayo International Hispanic basketball tournament annually in San Antonio. Teams from Texas, California, Colorado, Arizona, New Mexico, Oregon, Kansas, Nevada, and Illinois, as well as teams from Mexico, participate.

== History ==
Latinos in Action held their first basketball tournament in May 1989. The sports association also acknowledges athletes for their success in sports. Some notable athletes that have been honored by Latinos in Action are:

- Tom Flores of California, winner of two Super Bowls as head coach of the Oakland Raiders and Los Angeles Raiders. He is the only head coach who has won two Super Bowls and is yet to be inducted in the Pro Football Hall of Fame.
- Tommy Nuñez III of Arizona, longtime NBA referee. Nunez also runs a national Hispanic basketball tournament in Phoenix and promotes academics through athletics. He is active in the Hispanic communities of Arizona, California, and San Antonio, Texas.
- Tony Casillas of Oklahoma, one of the anchors of the Dallas Cowboys defensive line while on their way to a Super Bowl title.
- James Leija of San Antonio, a former world lightweight boxing champion.
- Julio Gallardo of El Paso, Texas, winner of 10 national championships in the Mexican Basketball league and member of the Mexican Olympic Team.

== See also ==
- Hispanic and Latino Americans
- Latino athletes in American sports
