= History of sport in Latin America =

Sport has played a significant role in shaping Latin American culture and society.

== Colonial era ==
As a result of imperialism and colonialism, historians note the diffusion of sports that brought football, baseball, boxing, cricket, and basketball from the empires to its colonies. In the context of Latin America, historians can acknowledge the power imbalances between the colonial elite and those of poorer circumstance by looking at sport history. For instance, dating back to the pre-columbian Mesoamerica, horsemanship contests were an integral part of leisure activity for the individuals of the colonies. However, many colonial official took advantage of their power over the poor people's accessibility to the game by preventing the poorer individuals from accessing the horses. This attempt to control and manipulate the people of the colony failed as many of the indigenous people needed the horses for labor– labor that would serve to benefit the upper class who exploit the colony.

Furthermore, horses played an important role in the early day of Latin American sport. Such examples include the horsemanship contests mentioned above, the charreada of Mexico, other equestrian activities in the region that would eventually be Argentina and Uruguay, etc. These sport gave the indigenous people the opportunity to practice values of talent, honor, and teamwork. It also was accessible to the poorer indigenous individuals of the colony because horses were affordable and not relatively expensive to the people of a lower class than those colonial elite. Some Basque ball games were also brought over.

== Postcolonial era ==
Sports became increasingly popular, drawing enthusiastic fans to large stadia. The International Olympic Committee (IOC) worked to encourage Olympic ideals and participation. Following the 1922 Latin American Games in Rio de Janeiro, the IOC helped to establish national Olympic committees and prepare for future competition. In Brazil, however, sporting and political rivalries slowed progress as opposing factions fought to control of international sport. The 1924 Summer Olympics in Paris and the 1928 Summer Olympics in Amsterdam saw greatly increased participation from Latin American athletes. English and Scottish engineers brought futebol (soccer) to Brazil in the late 1800s. The International Committee of the YMCA of North America and the Playground Association of America played major roles in training coaches. During this time, North American influence became one of the main sources of Latin American sporting culture.

== Contemporary era ==
Many of the major baseball leagues in the region were established in the 1940s and '50s.
