= Television in Peru =

Television in Peru has a history of more than 60 years. There are 105 television broadcasters in Peru, 22 of which are in Lima. In regard to television receivers, in 2003 there were 5,470,000 — that is 200 televisions for every thousand inhabitants. The number of cable subscribers was 967,943 in 2011.

== History ==
The first experimental transmission of television in Peru occurred on September 21, 1939, transmitting a film and an artistic program from Nuestra Señora de Guadalupe school in Lima. Another test transmission was made by Antonio Pereyra from the Bolivar Hotel on May 28, 1954. On January 17, 1958, the Ministry of Education and UNESCO inaugurated the State Channel 7 and conducted a test broadcast. In November 1971 the Peruvian government announced that it would seize 51% of all commercial television stations.

== Digital television ==
On March 30, 2010, Peru starts digital television transition, with TV Perú being the first television station to begin broadcast digitally.

== Television stations ==
- América (Canal 4)
- ATV (Canal 9)
- ATV Sur
- ATV+
- Canal IPe
- Canal N
- Global
- Latina
- Panamericana
- Movistar Plus
- TV Perú
- TV Perú Noticias
- La Tele

== Most viewed channels ==
The most viewed of these channels are mainly based in the capital of Lima, of which the amount of people watching is measured by Kantar Ibope Media, or IBOPE.

América Televisión - 22.98% audience share

Latina - 16.38% audience share

ATV (not to be confused with ATV (Australia) or ATV (Turkey) or Associated Television) - 10.84% audience share

=== Popular channels, but no audience share ===
Global TV Exitosa TV RPP (is a radio station, but has a tv channel) Panamerica TV TV Perú (state owned) Willax Televisión

Bethel TV RBC TV ATV Sur

== See also ==
- Media of Peru
- Consejo Consultivo de Radio y Televisión
