= ATV =

ATV may refer to:

== Broadcasting ==
- Amateur television
- Analog television

=== Television channels and stations ===
- Ananda TV, a Bangladeshi television channel
- Andorra Televisió
- Anguilla Television
- Ayna TV, Afghanistan
- ATV (Armenia)
- ATV (Aruba), NBC affiliate
- ATV (Australian TV station), Melbourne
- ATV (Austria)
  - ATV2
- ATV (Canada), the former name of CTV Atlantic
- Asia Television, Hong Kong online media company and former Hong Kong TV station
  - ATV Asia, former Cantonese-language channel
  - ATV Home, former Cantonese-language channel
  - ATV World, former English-language channel
- ATV (Hungary)
- Aomori Television, Japan
- ATV Jordan
- ATV (Pakistan)
- ATV (Peruvian TV channel)
  - ATV Sur
  - ATV+
- ATV (Russia)
- ATV (Suriname)
- ATV (Turkish TV channel)
- Associated Television, United Kingdom (1955–1981)
  - ATV Music, a subsidiary, now part of Sony/ATV Music Publishing
- Antenna TV
- Alternativna TV
- Azad Azerbaijan TV

== Transportation ==
- All-terrain vehicle, for off-road use
- Advanced Technology Vessel, Indian nuclear submarine project
- Agena target vehicle, a booster system used in the Gemini space program
- Automated Transfer Vehicle, ESA uncrewed resupply spacecraft, originally Ariane Transfer Vehicle
- ATV, IATA code for Ati Airport, Chad

== Other uses ==
- ATV Corporation, an audiovisual electronics company founded by Ikutaro Kakehashi
- A Tree Viewer, software for displaying phylogenetic trees
- Alternative TV, a British punk/post-punk band
- Advanced Technology Ventures, an American venture capital company
- Apple TV (device), a set-top box microconsole made by Apple

== See also ==
- TV (disambiguation)
- AT (disambiguation)
