= Willax Televisión =

- Cada vez más cerca de ti (Closer to you every time)
- Type: Digital terrestrial television
- Country: Peru
- Network: AgenciaPerú Producciones S.A.C.
- Headquarters: Lima

Programming
- Language: Spanish
- Picture format: 1080i HDTV (downscaled to 16:9 480i for standard-definition signal)

Ownership
- Owner: Erasmo Wong Lu
- Parent: Corporación E Wong
- Key people: Enrique Luna Victoria (General Manager); Alberto Moreno Shimabukuro (Television Manager)

History
- Launched: 18 August 2010; 16 years ago
- Founder: Gilberto Hume
- Replaced: Monitor

Links
- Website: willax.tv

Availability

Terrestrial
- Digital VHF: Channel 1

Willax Televisión (commonly known as Willax, from Quechua willaq [ˈwɪʎaχ] 'narrator, informant') (Note: Willaq ‘the one who tells, informant, fact’ is the agentive participle of the verb willay ‘to tell, recount, inform’. ‘News report’ is expressed as willakuy ‘information, account, narration’.) is a Peruvian free-to-air television channel, owned by Erasmo Wong Lu. It began as an internet channel in 2010, with a television channel launching later that year.

== History ==
In 1998, journalist Cecilia Valenzuela founded Imediaperu, a company specializing in investigative journalism initially published online and later distributed through mass media. The company later changed its name to AgenciaPerú and produced the Sunday programs Entrelíneas for the pay-TV channel Canal N and La ventana indiscreta for the free-to-air channel Latina Televisión. These programs exposed corruption cases during the governments of Alberto Fujimori, Alejandro Toledo, and Alan García.

In 2006, Guillermo Hume, former director of Canal N and the Sunday program Cuarto Poder on the free-to-air channel América Televisión, joined AgenciaPerú as general producer. The company also began producing the program Dos dedos de frente, hosted by Augusto Álvarez Rodrich and Juan Carlos Tafur. Two years later, in 2008, AgenciaPerú shifted its focus and decided to launch its own online media outlet. Additionally, a group of 16 shareholders with equal shares was formed, giving full control of the outlet to Hume.

Willax was founded by journalist Gilberto Hume and his wife, Cecilia Valenzuela, in 2010. Willax was founded after the relaunch of AgenciaPerú, originally established in 2008. The channel's name comes from the Quechua word willaq, meaning 'narrator, informant', probably to relate it to willakuy 'news'.

In early 2010, Willax was founded as an online news television channel operating from the former studios of Monitor. By late September 2010, it began distribution on Claro TV (then Telmex TV) on channel 8 of its digital cable service. On October 1, 2010, it joined the lineup of Movistar TV (then Cable Mágico) on channel 66 of its analog cable service (later moved to channel 36 after a few months). In 2011, Willax announced a partnership with TV Perú during the 2011 elections to launch its interview program Mira quien habla. It also partnered with the Trujillo-based channel Sol TV to broadcast some of its news programs on its signal.

In 2014, Willax moved to channel 18 on Movistar TV’s analog cable service. In November 2015, Corporación EW acquired Willax Televisión and shifted the channel’s focus; its programming transitioned from a news channel to a generalist one, while retaining its news and current affairs segments. The channel also relocated its operations to the Plaza Norte shopping center.

In November 2015, the channel was purchased by Erasmo Wong Lu, former owner of the Wong supermarket chain, via its company Corporación EW. After the acquisition, Wong Lu transformed Willax into a free-to-air television station on Lima's digital terrestrial television service and changed the focus of the channel; its programming changed from being a news channel to a general channel, although it maintained its news and current affairs programming. It also changed its operations headquarters to the Plaza Norte shopping center in Independencia District. Later, Willax would acquire the Monitor studios and return to the studios where Willax would still record some programs.

In 2016, Willax transitioned from a pay television channel to a free-to-air television channel on Lima’s digital terrestrial television (DTT) on virtual channel 12.1. On August 4, 2017, the channel changed its numbering, moving from 12.1 to 1.1 on the DTT.

In 2020, Willax increased the number of original productions on the channel, especially political opinion programs like Beto a Saber, La Hora Caviar, Rey con Barba and ComButters with prime hours beginning at 8:00 p.m. and ending at midnight. In April, due to the closure of schools as a result of the COVID-19 pandemic, the channel began simulcasting from TV Perú with the educational government TV program Aprendo en casa in the mornings.

In 2021, Corporación EW (Eduardo, Edgardo, Efraín, Eric, and Erasmo Wong Lu Vega) dissolved, with the intent for each member to pursue independent business ventures, leaving Erasmo as the sole owner of most of the group’s companies, including Willax Televisión.

In 2022, the channel preemptively acquired the broadcast rights for the Carlos Stein vs. Universitario match, one of the few matches aired outside the channel holding the rights to Liga 1 Liga 1, GolTV, and the first to feature a female camerawoman in this tournament.

In May 2023, Willax’s manager, Alberto Moreno Shimabukuro, signed a partnership with the American network Telemundo.

Regarding the political crisis in 2021, Willax echoed Keiko Fujimori’s false claims of stolen elections, including the election denial movement in Peru, despite the lack of substantial evidence supporting these accusations. Subsequently, the channel intensified confrontations with the political party Perú Libre since its rise to power that year. Journalists attacked the party and its political positions, actions that prompted legal retaliation from then-President Pedro Castillo. Additionally, the IACHR included Willax in its report on the social unrest in Peru for its role in the events.

== Programming ==
The channel’s programming focuses on news, politics, and miscellaneous content. Since 2015, Willax shifted to include entertainment, Turkish telenovelas, news, and political programs.

In 2017, Korean dramas were added to the channel’s lineup after acquiring their rights from Panamericana Televisión. In 2018, Willax began airing anime in a primetime block called Hora Ánime, later moved to Saturdays, which included iconic films like Akira. A year later, the channel launched the Butaca Vip programming block focused on movies, followed by Butaca Extreme for horror films and Cine Willax for classic movies. That same year, two music programs were introduced: one focused on K-pop, called El especial del K-pop/music core, and another on salsa, called Los especiales con Farik Grippa.

In 2020, Willax increased its original productions, particularly political opinion programs airing in primetime from 8:00 AM to midnight. In April, the channel began retransmitting TV Perú’s Aprendo en casa program in the mornings and afternoons on the virtual subchannel 1.2 on DTT due to the COVID-19 quarantine. That same year, the entertainment and gossip program Amor y fuego was launched, hosted by Rodrigo González and Gigi Mitre.

In 2021, the channel’s primetime lineup included the news program Willax Noticias and the sports program Willax Deportes with Eddie Fleischman, as well as its own programs hosted by Milagros Leiva, Beto Ortiz, and Phillip Butters, which focused on politics and covered the 2021 political crisis. In 2024, Ortiz and Butters left the channel due to editorial reasons. The former program PBO en Willax, hosted by Butters, was replaced by Al Día con Willax, hosted by journalists Alvina Ruiz, Perla Berrios, and Omar Ruiz de Somocurcio, while his nighttime program Combutters was replaced by Crónicas de Impacto, hosted by Andrea Arana and Valeria Flórez.

In June 2025, after 14 years, the program Rey con Barba went off the air. Additionally, the Turkish telenovela ¿Qué culpa tiene Fatmagul? and ¡Habla Chino!, hosted by Aldo Miyashiro, who left América Televisión, were added to the lineup, replacing Crónicas de Impacto. The weekend news program Hechos en Willax joined the Monday-to-Friday schedule as a magazine at 11:25 a.m., replacing Willax Mediodía, while on Saturdays and Sundays, it retained its format as a compilation of the week’s best programming. The Sunday program Contra Corriente moved to a Monday-to-Friday schedule.

=== News programs and editorial stance ===
The political programming segments on Willax are characterized by a conservative and libertarian editorial stance. These segments feature specialists who share these ideological leanings, including members of the Coordinadora Republicana collective. Additionally, the channel has allowed some interviewees to claim the existence of alleged political interference by its detractors. On some occasions, Willax reporters have interviewed individuals with differing views, such as Susel Paredes, whom they interrupted and claimed “lacked moral authority” to express her opinions.

According to IDL-Reporteros, Willax initially supported the investigations of Pedro Castillo conducted by the Special Team of Prosecutors Against Corruption in Power (Eficcop), an institution established by Patricia Benavides. The channel expressed enthusiasm for Eficcop’s actions and its leader, Marita Barreto, from its inception until late 2023, when it began scrutinizing the team and portraying its members negatively. In 2024, Willax removed YouTube videos that had previously shown support for Eficcop.

Subsequently, an article by Perú 21 titled “Gabinete W” alleged that Willax journalists, such as Beto Ortiz and Phillip Butters, leveraged close ties with authorities to present political events in a manner favorable to the government of Dina Boluarte and against critics of the then-National Prosecutor, Patricia Benavides, such as Gustavo Gorriti. Benavides, a figure opposed by various conservative groups, sparked verbal disputes among journalists due to their freedom of expression. Prosecutor José Domingo Pérez noted that, at one point, the National Prosecutor’s Office had functioned as a “reception desk” for Willax, but this changed following a conflict with the new National Prosecutor, Delia Espinoza.

The channel also engaged in smear campaigns against Prosecutor Manuela Villar and Judge Richard Concepción Carhuancho, who investigated owner Erasmo Wong. La República reported in 2025 that these campaigns mirrored those against Marita Barreto.

==== Patricia Benavides case ====
A significant example of Willax’s editorial stance, which influenced other media, was its public support for Patricia Benavides, as reported by IDL-Reporteros. During a conversation, Benavides’ then-advisor, Jaime Villanueva, alleged a plot against her by her predecessor, Zoraida Ávalos, as well as by the channel and Congress. Marita Barreto, then Eficcop’s leader, was also identified as one of Benavides’ detractors. Following Benavides’ dismissal and the emergence of the corruption scandal in the Prosecutor’s Office, Barreto reported that a vehicle linked to Willax’s press team was conducting illegal surveillance on her collaborators. Meanwhile, Benavides presented a hired expert to defend herself against the accusations.

Benavides endorsed her former advisor’s accusations against Gustavo Gorriti, which were broadcast on the channel. At the time, Keiko Fujimori, leader of Popular Force, reiterated some of these claims, alleging that Gorriti was responsible for influencing criminal investigations against her in the Cocktails Case.

Later, Villanueva claimed that the suspended National Prosecutor had leaked information to journalists like Beto Ortiz regarding investigations into Barreto. However, Benavides responded to Ortiz with insults in a leaked audio, accusing him of orchestrating a campaign against her in exchange for alleged personal favors. The former prosecutor later admitted the existence of this audio. Phillip Butters advised Benavides to make decisions with her “trusted staff,” warning that poor personnel choices could lead to imprisonment.

Finally, Willax welcomed Benavides back, where she accused Villanueva of betrayal and confirmed her intent to remove the current head of the Public Prosecutor’s Office, Delia Espinoza, to reclaim her position.

== Political alignment ==
The channel has been described as conservative and right-wing by international media outlets. Willax supported Keiko Fujimori and her Fujimorism movement according to Peruvian journalist Augusto Álvarez Rodrich. The owner of Willax, Wong Lu, signed the Madrid Charter, a document opposing the presence of left-wing governments in Ibero-America.

Initially, its programming focused exclusively on news, but over time it became generalist, diversifying with movies of various genres, children’s series, animes, magazines, entertainment programs, and the broadcast of Korean dramas, while maintaining blocks of current affairs and political programs. Since its acquisition by Corporación EW, owned by the Wong Lu Vega brothers, the channel gained popularity for its right-wing political content tied to conservatism.

Although the channel’s presenters retained some editorial freedom after the ownership change, since 2020, the channel’s editorial stance became more radical with the addition of new conservative journalists and personalities to its political segments. The content of its political programs sparked numerous controversies, particularly due to the use of derogatory terms against politicians, opponents, activists, protesters, or any adversaries of the channel.

Willax has been accused by academics, politicians, and journalists of promoting disinformation, conspiracy theories in its opinion programs, and misleading its audience about science, particularly regarding the COVID-19 pandemic. Its news programs have also been compared to Fox News, the American news channel owned by Rupert Murdoch. Some of this disinformation has had international repercussions.

As a result, far-right groups, particularly La Resistencia, have maintained ties with the media outlet due to their ideological alignment. Additionally, the Institute for Legal Defense (IDL) has denounced a plot to silence independent journalists by this outlet. Journalists were attacked by the channel’s hosts without presenting any evidence to support their accusations.

== Controversies ==
=== 2020 protests ===
During the November 2020 protests in Peru, journalist Beto Ortiz on his program Beto a saber made derogatory remarks, stating: “Last night they were celebrating that there was a dead person; in the end, no one has died. They’re desperate for a corpse to appear quickly so they can parade it on their shoulders and claim it’s a dictatorship, that there’s state terrorism.” In response, the X accounts of Ortiz and Willax Televisión were hacked. Ortiz announced he also received threats of potential public shaming. On November 16, Ortiz commented again on his program about the deaths of Inti Sotelo and Brian Pintado, sparking controversy by calling them “cannon fodder of all wars.” As a result, Willax lost sponsorships from brands like Universal and Supermercados Peruanos, among others.

The television program Rey con Barba aired on Sunday, November 15, 2020, photographs of a seizure of homemade weapons, which it attributed to protesters participating in the 2020 Peruvian protests. However, these images were taken from evidence seized by the Carabineros de Chile. Following this incident, Willax Televisión issued an apology for the false images shown on the program.

=== COVID-19 vaccination ===
On February 9, 2021, following the start of the COVID-19 vaccination in Peru, the program Beto a saber aired a report claiming that Peruvians could travel to Chile to receive the COVID-19 vaccine, terming it “medical tourism.” The Chilean news program Meganoticias broadcast this report, which was labeled a “disinformation campaign” by Deputy Javier Macaya. Then-Chilean Foreign Minister Andrés Allamand clarified that “foreigners in the country with a tourist visa will not have the right to be vaccinated in Chile.”

On February 10, 2021, journalist Carlos Paredes revealed that former President Martín Vizcarra and his wife, Maribel Díaz, had received the Sinopharm COVID-19 vaccine in October 2020. Subsequent journalistic investigations revealed that Health Minister Pilar Mazzetti and Foreign Affairs Minister Elizabeth Astete had also been irregularly vaccinated. The scandal, dubbed “Vacunagate”, involved several Executive Branch officials, their associates, and personnel in charge of the clinical trial.

On March 5, 2021, the program Beto a saber aired a report on the clinical trial of the Sinopharm COVID-19 vaccine at the Cayetano Heredia University, where Ernesto Bustamante claimed the vaccine’s efficacy was 33.3% (Wuhan strain) and 11.5% (Hong Kong strain). The trial’s lead, Coralith García, acknowledged the report’s accuracy but noted it was “a preliminary report of the project’s results,” with final results expected after eight weeks. The Peruvian Medical Association issued a statement rejecting “any partial or incomplete information,” including “confusion regarding efficacy and effectiveness analyses.” In a statement released by the Chinese Embassy in Peru, Sinopharm described the report as “severely lacking in truthfulness and irresponsible,” spreading “unverified, unscientific, inaccurate, and incomplete data.”

=== Promotion of conspiracy theories ===
Since 2020, Willax has faced scrutiny from the press for its increased focus on opinion programming. Comparisons have been made to Fox News, the American news channel owned by Rupert Murdoch, with accusations that the channel’s opinion programming promotes disinformation and conspiracy theories.

According to Fernando Tuesta, Willax played a crucial role in spreading the narrative that the elections in Peru were fraudulent, in which Keiko Fujimori was involved. The channel gave ample airtime to those demanding the annulment of polling stations and an audit by the OAS, promoting this theory without any evidence. By July 2024, the channel hired two lawyers who supported the alleged “fraud” in the 2021 elections to anticipate similar issues in 2026.

In 2022, Iván Escudero, who had worked for the Sunday program Contracorriente, reported on two occasions that some of his family members had been kidnapped due to his work as a reporter. These claims were questioned in 2024 when Escudero reported another attempted kidnapping after being hired by Panamericana Televisión. Given the contradictions in the kidnapping claims revealed by Willax itself and the lack of evidence, Escudero decided to abandon Sunday programs.

=== 2021 Peruvian general election ===
According to Spanish newspaper El País, Willax is "a channel known for ... broadcasting of false news". During the 2021 Peruvian general election which saw right-wing Keiko Fujimori and leftist Pedro Castillo compete for the presidency, Peruvian psychologist Henry Guillén stated that "fake news has gone viral regarding Castillo and his links with the Shining Path, media like Willax have defamed several leftist leaders who accompany him". Willax journalists Milagros Leiva and Beto Ortiz called for the National Jury of Elections to dissolve its fact checking system to combat fake news. Leiva also accused the National Office of Electoral Processes of supporting electoral fraud stating that her deceased father-in-law was still registered to vote, though the office replied saying that the registry was locked in place since his death, telling Leiva "Please don't spread fake news".

On 18 July 2021, the Public Ministry of Peru opened an investigation into Willax journalists Philip Butters, Humberto Ortiz and Enrique Luna Victoria, alleging that they were responsible for acts of sedition and inciting civil unrest. Prosecutor Juana Meza wrote that Willax disseminated "news with a conspiratorial connotation, inciting the electoral results to be unknown, trying to weaken the electoral institutions and even calling for a coup d'état" and was used as a platform "to send messages of hatred and incitement to kill". Presidential candidate Rafael López Aliaga was also named in the investigation. López Aliaga reportedly called for death in two separate incidents; in May 2021 he chanted "Death to communism! Death to Cerrón! Death to Castillo!" to supporters and at the Respect My Vote rally that was organized by Willax TV owner Erasmo Wong Lu on 26 June 2021, where the politician stated "Death to communism, get out of here, filthy communists, you have awakened the lion, to the streets!"

=== Defamation complaint for “terruqueo” (false accusation of terrorism) ===
On February 9, 2022, during his own program Beto a saber, Beto Ortiz aired a report portraying Raida Cóndor, a human rights activist and mother of one of the victims of the La Cantuta massacre carried out by the Colina Group, as the Shining Path militant Iris Yolanda Quiñonez Colchado, alias Comrade “Bertha.” This happened after attempting to link the current Minister for Women, Diana Miloslavich, to Shining Path.

In May 2022, the journalist from that station, Milagros Leiva, stated on one of her television programs that former minister Anahí Durand had ties to terrorism; however, since these claims could not be conclusively proven, in January 2023 the journalist was convicted of defamation in the first instance, receiving a one-year probation and ordered to pay 20,000 soles, with the broadcaster Willax held jointly liable.

The opinions of its hosts were discussed in the magazine Cosas, which described their alleged impact on the millennial population.

=== Unsubstantiated attacks on independent journalists ===
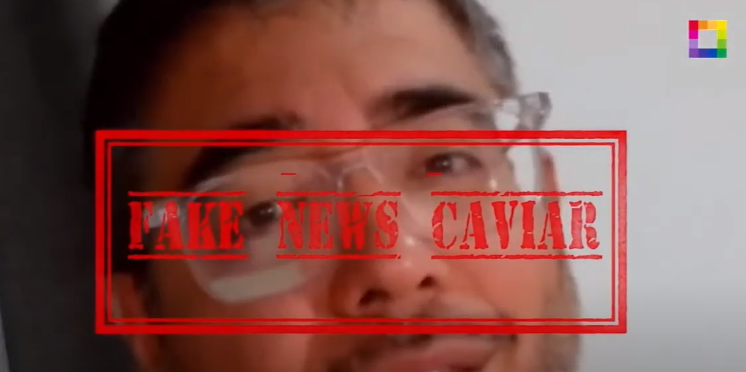
In some Willax programs, labels were used against journalists, such as the “fake news caviar caviar” stamp on the Sunday program Contracorriente against Marco Sifuentes of La Encerrona.

During its broadcasts, the channel used disparaging and defamatory language towards prominent representatives of independent journalism without providing evidence to support its accusations. Among those mentioned were Marco Sifuentes, wrongly accused of receiving clandestine benefits from the National Office of Electoral Processes; Paola Ugaz, falsely accused of advising Pedro Castillo; Rosa María Palacios, subjectively linked to the "caviar left"; and the portal Wayka, labeled as "the voice of Shining Path."

According to the media outlet La República, since 2023 there has been a smear campaign against journalist Gustavo Gorriti in which lawyer Luis Pacheco Mandujano allegedly participated, directly accusing him and claiming to have the evidentiary means to support and prove it—all of this on open-air television. The following year, the Judiciary accepted the aggravated defamation lawsuit against Mandujano for linking Gorriti and the Instituto de Defensa Legal to criminal activities.

In July 2024, journalist César Hildebrandt reported that the Interior Minister, Juan Santiváñez, insulted him during an interview at the Willax studios. This minister threatened Hildebrandt with legal action after a report revealed his alleged ties to drug trafficking.

=== Other incidents ===
In July 2017, Phillip Butters of Willax's ComButters program made controversial comments about Afro-Ecuadorians on Ecuador's football team, stating "The Ecuadorians aren't black, they're mountain crocodiles" and that Felipe Caicedo "isn't human, he's a monkey. A gorilla." Willax suspended the program until Butters made an apology.

During the 2020 Peruvian protests, the Willax channel's Rey con Barba program broadcast images of homemade weapons purporting they were used in Peru when they were actually seized from Chilean protests; an attempt to discredit protests according to Perú.21.

== Presenters ==
- Enrique García (2010–2016)
- Francis Vera (2017–2018)
- Guerci Fernández Contreras (2018–2021)
- Luis Enrique Outten (2022–present)

== See also ==
- Caviar mafia (conspiration)
- Digital terrestrial television in Peru
- Television in Peru
- Vacunagate
- Media coverage during the 2021–present Peruvian political crisis
