= ATV+ =

Peruvian television channel

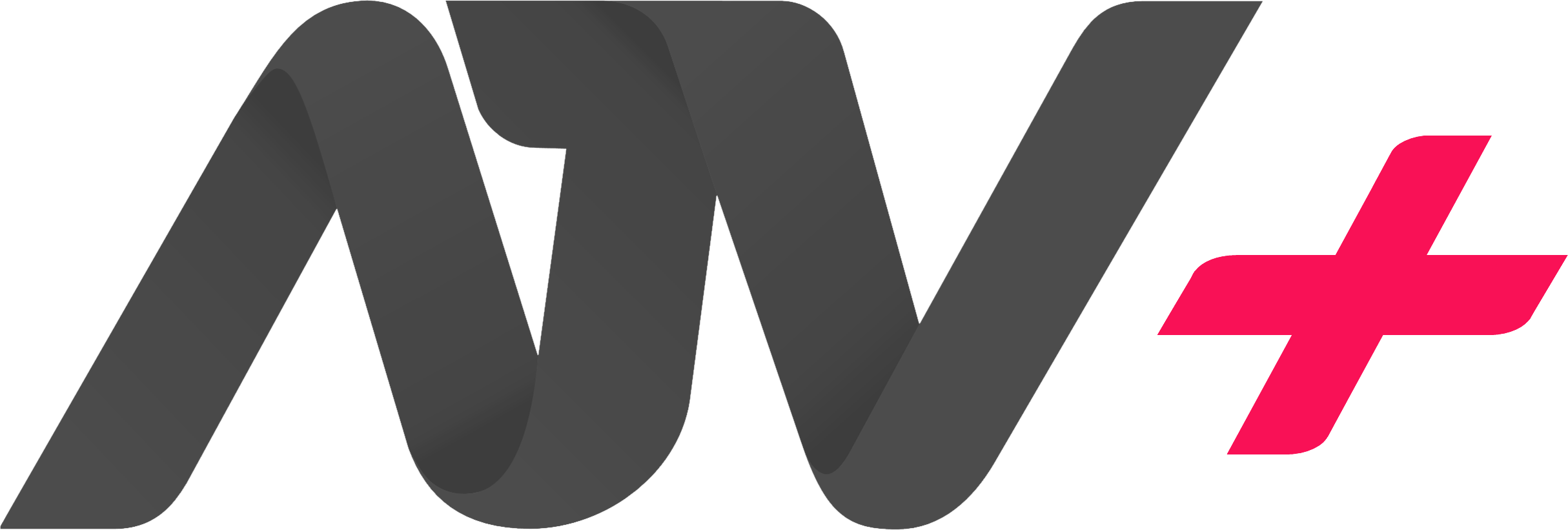
- Type: Television network
- Country: Peru
- Broadcast area: Peru

Programming
- Picture format: 1080i HDTV

Ownership
- Owner: Andina de Radiodifusión S.A.C. (Grupo ATV/Albavisión)

History
- Launched: September 21, 2011; 15 years ago
- Former names: Andina de Radiodifusión Televisión

Links
- Website: www.atv.pe/envivo-atvmas

Availability

Terrestrial
- Over-the-air: Channel 8.1 (Lima, listings may vary)

ATV+ (ATV Más) is a Peruvian over-the-air news channel, owned by Grupo ATV, which started broadcasting on September 21, 2011. Its programming is based on national and international news, as well as miscellany.

== History ==
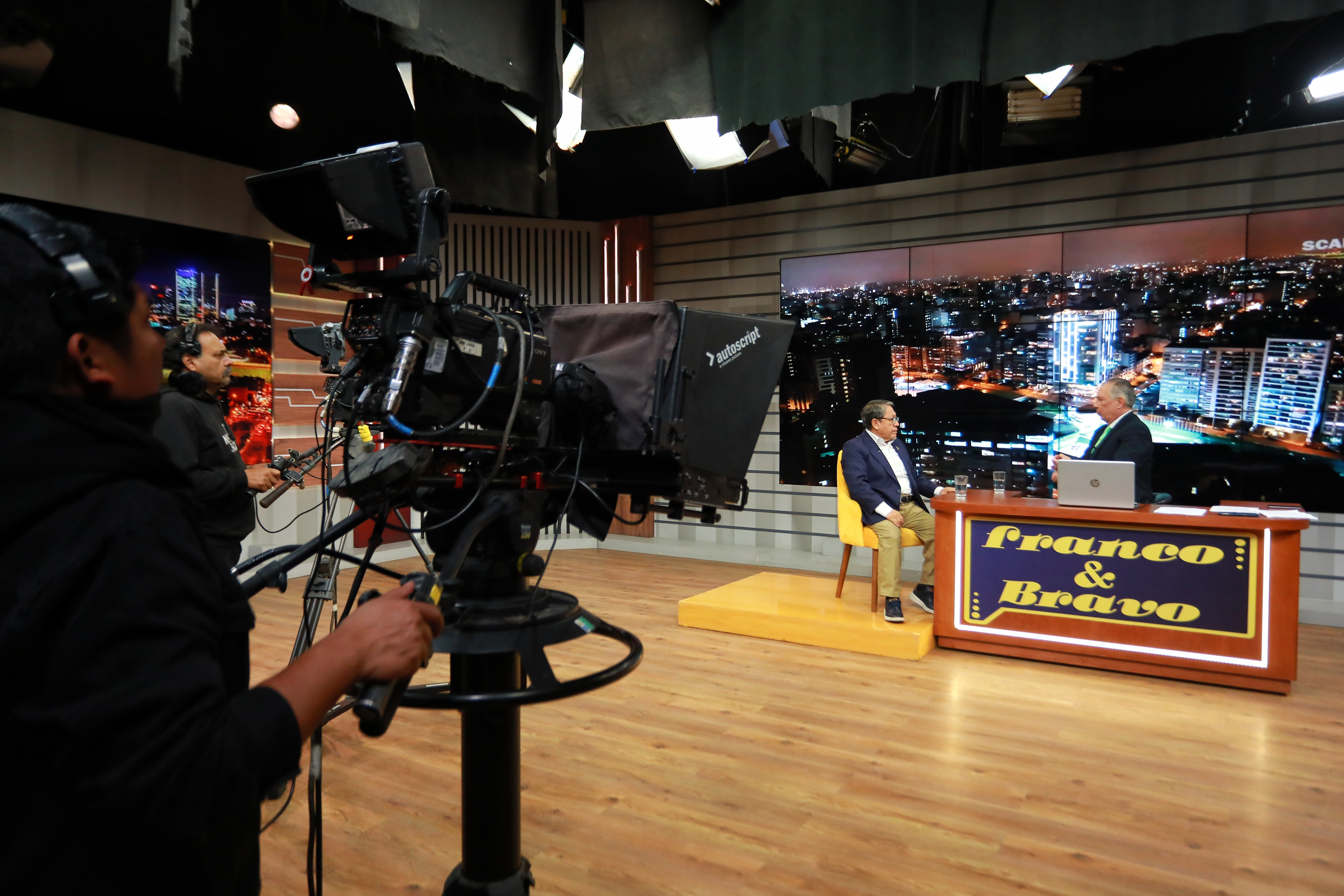
ATV+'s studio with Ciro Castillo Rojo presenting Franco y Bravo.

In mid 2011, ATV+ started test broadcasts on UHF channel 21 in Lima, by airing music videos in tandem with its physical digital channel (39), airing music videos.

On November 16, 2011, it started cable coverage on Movistar TV. Initially it aired its programming from 5:30am to midnight, later in 2012, its programming went 24/7.

The programs in the first phase were: ATV+ Noticias, +Perú, +QN (Más Que Noticias), +Mundo, Doble Clic, 8, Buenas Noches. In addition, relays of programs from ATV (Primera Noticia, ATV Noticias Edición Central, Diez, Nunca Más, Día D) and Global TV (Tribuna Abierta), were aired in simulcast.

From May 2012, ATV+ became a subchannel of ATV HD on channel 9.2. In 2012 and 2013, it added new programs such as +Deportes, Al Día, Economía En Directo, Dándole Vueltas y Hasta Mañana.

Uranio TV reappeared in 2012 through physical digital UHF channel 39.1 during the ligitation between Grupo ATV and RBC Televisión (now Viva TV) for VHF channel 11 in Lima. According to ATV staff, the group planned to take over channel 11 and would used it to relaunch Uranio TV, since it had previously rented the channel through ATV Sur. However, once the Supreme Court fell in favor of RBC, Uranio TV shut down completely and its UHF signal is used to launch ATV+ in Lima as part of a "news alternative", on virtual channel 8.1, in high definition. Arpeggio TV started broadcasting as ATV+'s subchannel on channel 8.2 until 2017, when it shut down.

On March 2, 2015, ATV+ was relaunched as ATV+ Noticias, with changes inside its own news team, entrance of new journalists and a new theme. New programs were launched: Primer Reporte, Edición Matinal, Edición Tarde, De 3 a 5, Edición Central, Hora Clave, Redes y Poder nad Punto de Vista.The weekend news bulletins were removed, only airing archived current affairs programs previously seen on ATV, such as Diez or Nunca Más.

On February 19, 2018, ATV+ Noticias reverted its name to ATV+, changing its look, introducing new programs and changing its theme again. Its weekday news bulletins changed their structure and new segments would become part of the channel until 2025: Noticias al Día, Línea Directa, Andrea Al Mediodía, En Contacto, +Deportes, +QNoticias, Estación Central, Sin Rodeos and Punto de Vista; no live news programs on weekends were relaunched. Its SD feed changed form 4:3 to 16:9 and became a downscaled copy of the HD channel.

On March 4, 2019, ATV+ introduced a new look and a new musical thee which adapted throughout the day. The plus sign in the logo changed daccording to the time of day: yellow (during mornings), red (during afternoons) and blue (during evenings). In this brief period it premiered A tiempo, a social responsibility program supported by the Congress of the Republic. The programs suffered modifications, Linea Directa and Andrea Al Mediodía were cancelled and replaced by Noticias al Día, in 2020 Sin Rodeos was also cancelled, replaced by Estación Central.

In late 2021, ATV+ changed its UHF channel in Lima, moving from channel 21 to channel 23, doing a channel swap with ATV Sur, which moved to channel 21.1.

On March 31, 2022, ATV+ was added to Vix, but was removed in early 2023 with the launch of ViX+. That same month, it added Tierra adentro. In April, Punto de vista was relaunched with Katty Villalobos as its presenter. She left the group at the end of the year.

On February 7, 2023, ATV+ made a new channel swap with its sister channel La Tele, which operated on UHF channel 15 on analog (10.1 on digital), while La Tele moved to channel 23 on analog (23.1 on digital). +Deportes was cancelled as an independent progarm that year.

On April 29, 2024, some of its programs like En Contacto and Estación Central were now shown in simulcast with Global, the channel now only airs Al Día and En Contacto. On July 29, 2024, Franco & Bravo premiered, presented by Oscar Eduardo Bravo. Said program ended on December 30, 2024.

On April 10, 2025, ATV+ made a drastic change to its programming after a financial crisis that hit Grupo ATV, and in the middle of a round of rumors which suggested the closure of the channel. During the early days of the new measure, it only broadcast live programming from 5am to 2pm, and in the remaining hours, it aired repeats for a nine-hour round. Later, according to Christian Bayro, on April 15, it reestablished its live programming from 2pm to 9pm with a videocasting format, announced as part of a "new season of ATV+", whereas the progarms seen during this timeslot (En Contacto II, +QNoticias, Estación Central and Punto de vista) were cancelled, due to the restructuring and new programming. New programs premiered days later, and gradually: El Deportivo Digital, presented by Steve Romero and Jason Sánchez, Fe de Erratas, presened by Karina Reynafarge and Diego Ocmin, De 5 a 7, with Josh Zelada, Gabriela García and Eder Martínez, and Off The Record, presented by Juan Carlos Gambini. These new programs were simulcast on linear television and on the YouTube channels of ATV Noticias and ATV Deportes.

On July 6, 2025, Franco & Bravo returned for a second season, now shown on weekends at 8pm.
