= Grupo RPP =

Peruvian media conglomerate

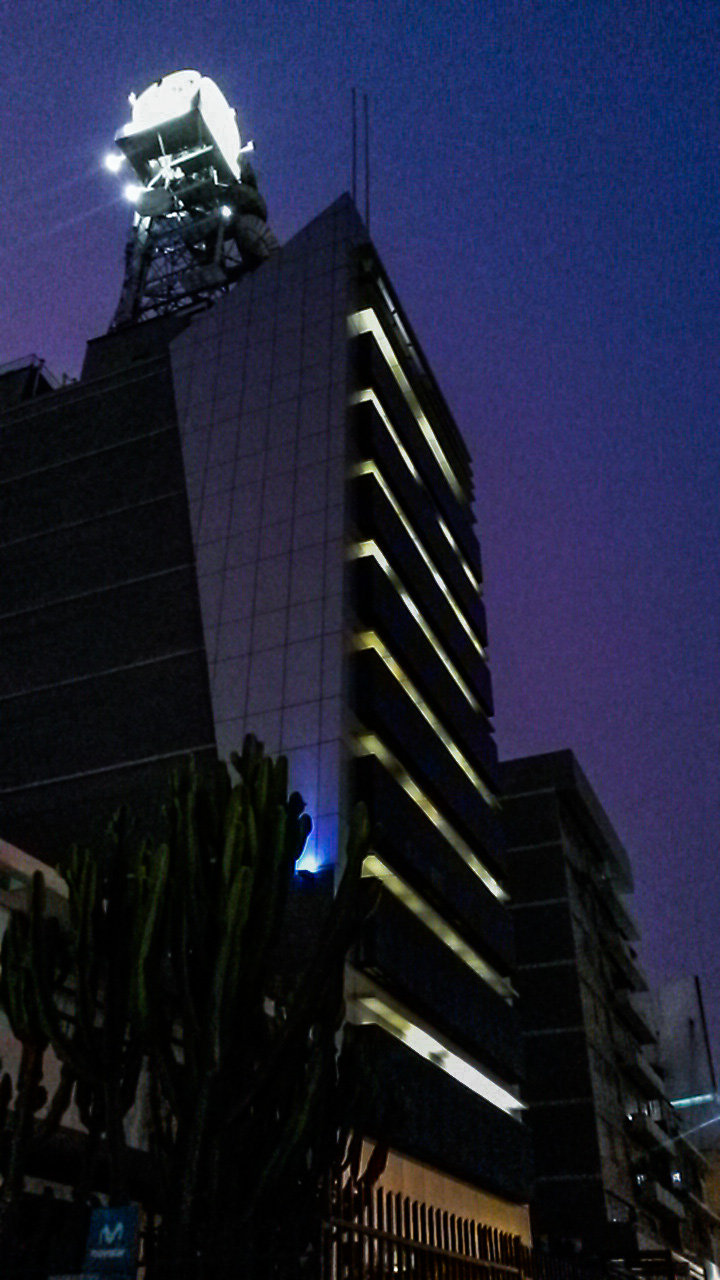
- View of the Edificio Grupo RPP in Lima.
- Industry: Mass media
- Founded: 2000; 26 years ago
- Headquarters: Lima, Peru
- Key people: Manuel Delgado Parker (Chairman and CEO)
- Products: Radio, television
- Owner: Hugo Delgado Nachtigall
- Number of employees: 1,070
- Website: www.gruporpp.com.pe

The Grupo RPP is a Peruvian media conglomerate that owns several chains of radio stations, television channels and other businesses that are run by businessman Manuel Delgado Parker.

== History ==
=== The first years ===
Considered one of Peru's largest multimedia companies. Genaro Delgado Parker and Hector associated with Johnny E. Lindley, brothers created in 1963 to Radio Programas del Perú, which has been dabbling in new projects that have marked for more than 50 years, the taste, the approval and affection the hearing.

=== The following years ===
In 1979, in the signal amplitude modulated it began with the Rotary program Air, that was the first step leading to RPP News to become an uninterrupted information system working 24 hours a day. In 1985 RPP Noticias ran the satellite was the great instrument to fulfill this vocation of absolute simultaneity. In 1987, the radio is independent of the missing Pantel Group and the radio signal was transmitted by satellite to 33 major cities across the country; this year began simulcast on AM and FM, and multiplying the teams of journalists and correspondents. The concept of a single voice was transformed into the "All the Peru at a time" was no longer simply a program prepared in Lima reached throughout Peru, but the event of the province, through the news issued by a newspaper correspondent, it was heard and felt by the rest of Peru.

The first Rotary Air shared space with entertainment programming and public service. But soon, the need for simultaneous information began to grow. Soon, the Rotary Air became a space of two hours, were born live interviews, debates table, contrasting opinions, at a time when the country's political life was renewed. And he began the briefing was RPP News.

He ran 1985 and RPP Neoticias find on the satellite the great instrument to fulfill this vocation of absolute simultaneity. In the year 1987, the radio is independent of the missing Grupo Pantel and the radio signal was transmitted by satellite to 33 major cities across the country; this year began simulcast on AM and FM, and multiplying the teams of journalists and correspondents. The concept of a single voice was transformed into the "All the Peru at a time" was no longer simply a program prepared in Lima reached throughout Peru, but the event of the province, through the news issued by a newspaper correspondent, it was heard and felt by the rest of the Peru. From that moment, nothing Peru may find it alien to another Peruvian.

After the era of satellite, he began the era of information technology, using an electronic system designed especially for journalism. From 1996, thanks to the satellite phone, no matter the place where the fact occurred because the information be transmitted simultaneously achieved. That same year, RPP News started on the Internet and in 1997 had its Real Audio system: simultaneous transmission anywhere in the world. He born, and the international concurrency.

Growth continued, and new stations were born to join the group RPP. Then came new opportunities in the business of communication and materialized with the emergence of RPP Cable, RPP Noticias and RPP Mobile.

The experience gained over the years, to hand with technology and vision of its founders, make the Grupo RPP consolidates and remains a leader in the field of communications.

Today, the Grupo RPP has various lines of business to meet target audiences segmented radio: RPP Noticias, Studio 92 which was acquired in the early nineties; Capital which was inaugurated on 11 October 2008; Oxígeno, created in May 2004; Heart that was previously Radio Clasica 96; Happiness that was created in June 2006 which was KeBuena before!; The area was previously CPN Radio which aired until 27 July 2011 and the main web pages of the country in the segment and in the music and entertainment market.

Also account from 31 January 2011 with a television cable news programming that is RPP TV on Channel 10 Movistar TV, MCD Mercados, Radiomercados Sabrosa.

The concept of a single voice was transformed into the "All the Peru at a time" was no longer simply a program prepared in Lima reached throughout Peru, but the event of the province, through the news issued by a newspaper correspondent, it was heard and felt by the rest of Peru.

In 2012 it acquired the missing channel Unitel which relaunched it as Capital TV on channel 27 UHF TDT since 2014, but since 4 August is now officially on the air with news programming, interviews and additionally also in Retail business of screens.

In 2015, they launched the website that is La10.pe entirely specializing in sports information; thus becoming an alternative for users and customers, and also renewed RPP website to a website with a more modern and more flexible design for tablets and smartphones now calling RPP.PE.

== Radio ==
- Radio Programas del Perú
- Radio Felicidad
- Radio Oxígeno
- Radio Studio 92
- Radio Corazón 94.3
- Radio La Zona
- Radio Capital 96.7

== Television Channels ==
- RPP TV
- Capital Televisión

== Other enterprises ==
- Radiomercados Sabrosa
- MCD Mercados
- La10.pe
- Gogo.pe
- RPP Publicaciones
- BTL
- Pantallas Retail
- Cereales Ummana
- Integración
- Gemeni Inmobiliaria
- Joinnus

== Competition ==
His major and traditional competition in the media company CRP Radios belonging to the Zavala Falcon Family for years, with which he competes in the radio media.

== See also ==
- Manuel Delgado Parker
- CRP Medios y Entretenimiento
- Corporación Universal
- Grupo Panamericana de Radios
