= Terruqueo =

Peruvian political slur for leftists

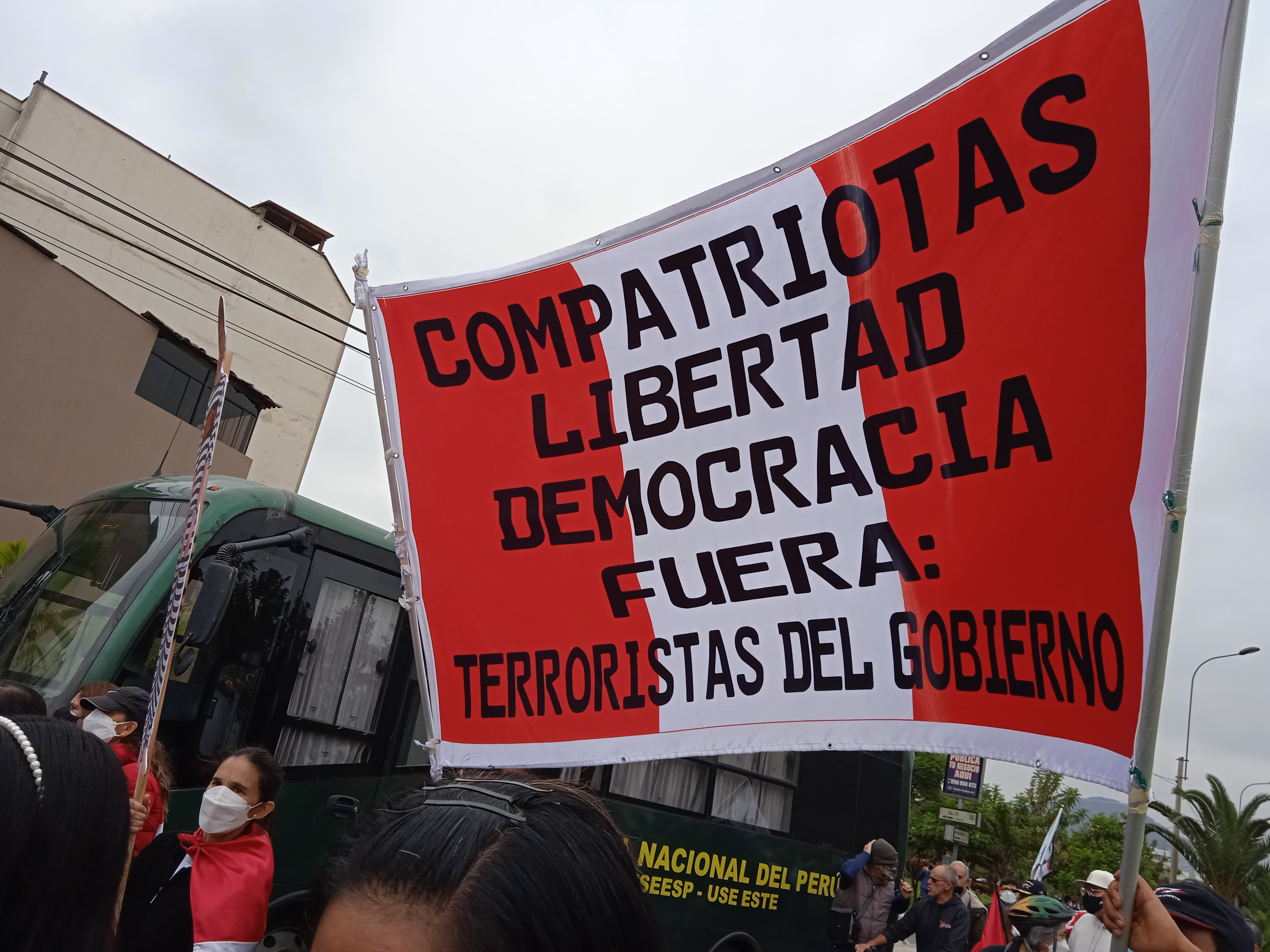
Protest sign against the administration of Pedro Castillo, stating "Get out: Terrorists of the government"

Terruqueo (from Andean Spanish terruco, -ca 'terrorist') refers in Peru to the act of falsely labeling people as terrorists or terrorist sympathizers without evidence, primarily via the use of the political pejoratives terruco or tuco. Usually, the victims are alleged to be linked to Shining Path and the Túpac Amaru Revolutionary Movement guerrilla, armed groups involved in the Peruvian Internal Armed Conflict.

This practice in political discourse has been described as a form of negative campaigning and often racist method of fearmongering weaponized against anti-Fujimorists, liberal or left-wing political opponents, or any kind of social inequality critics; and the tactic has primarily being used by right-wing parties and Fujimorists to create a culture of fear. It has also been described as a form of discoursive dehumanization. United Nations experts have condemned the use of the terruqueo, describing it as an intimidation tactic used by the government.

== Etymology ==
The term terruqueo is the verbification of the word terruco which derived from the word terrorista, or "terrorist" in English, a neologism which originated from individuals in Ayacucho describing Shining Path guerrillas during the internal conflict in Peru. Historian Carlos Aguire said that the -uco replaced the ending of the word terrorista by Quechua speakers since they typically terminate words with -uco.

Since the 1980s, the word terruco has been carelessly used by right-wing politicians in Peru to target left-wing, progressive and indigenous groups, with this baseless and often racist attack being called a terruqueo.

== History ==
=== 20th century ===
Since the 1930s, the political elite of Peru used fear mongering tactics to influence the public by targeting foreign communist movements according to historian Antonio Zapata of the Pontifical Catholic University of Peru, beginning with Joseph Stalin and later with Fidel Castro. Terruqueos began to appear during the 1980s and would occur throughout Peru's internal conflict. The basis of the terruqueo began during the presidency of Fernando Belaúnde when Legislative Decree 46 broadly defined terrorism as "any form of glorification or defense of the political discourse of subversive organizations".

==== Fujimori government ====
Into the 1990s, authoritarian president Alberto Fujimori utilized terruqueos with the help of the National Intelligence Service to discredit those who opposed him, including dissenters from his own government, with political scientist Daniel Encinas saying that this would evolve into conservative politicians using the attack to target those opposed to Fujimori's neoliberal economic policies and that the right-wing used the terruqueo as a "strategy of manipulating the legacy of political violence". Following the 1992 Peruvian self-coup, Fujimori would broaden the definition of terrorism in an effort to criminalize as many actions possible to persecute left-wing political opponents. The Fujimori government threatened activists and critics of the Peruvian Armed Forces with life imprisonment, describing such groups as the "legal arm" of terrorist groups. Ultimately, a culture of fear was created by Fujimori, with individuals fearing that they would be described as a terrorist.

Discussing Fujimori's actions, Fernando Velásquez Villalba states:

[T]he figure of the terrorist was presented as the personification of evil. [...]The harshness of Fujimori's anti-terrorist legislation places the terrorist as the most dangerous enemy for society and the state. [...] In other words, a terrorist, no matter how long he fulfills his sentence, will never cease to be a terrorist. The enemy will always be the enemy and, therefore, if the terrorist is still alive, the era of terrorism, at least in some memories, is a latent fear and can therefore be repeated. [...] In addition to being slanderous, the ''terruqueo'' has served to awaken deep memories and fears of internal armed conflict. In addition, the ''terruqueo'' undermines the attempts of social organizations to create any form of opposition against the hegemonic elites. Thus, the ''terruqueo'' is, mainly, an attempt to control and monopolize political legitimacy, resorting to memories of the recent past. The fear of a repetition of the painful past is powerful enough to manipulate public opinion and criticize the various social protests.

Thus, using the terruqueo, according to Velásquez Villalba, Fujimori made himself a "permanent hero" and made left-wing ideologies an eternal enemy within Peru.

=== 21st century ===
The terruqueo would then become so prominent that political discussions in Peru often devolved into the attacks, especially during elections. When Ollanta Humala, who initially espoused a left-wing ideology, was involved in Peruvian politics, opponents used the terruqueo against him, even though he was a soldier in the army who fought directly against the insurgency. The attack evolved into linking left-wing groups with Hugo Chávez and chavismo as the crisis in Venezuela began to unfold in the 2010s.

==== 2020 Peruvian protests ====
During the 2020 Peruvian protests against Manuel Merino, protesters whose motives were originally praised by the media were described as terrucos when they began to make labor rights demands. Congresswoman Martha Chávez of the Fujimorist Popular Force party described protesters as "vandals and extremists, undoubtedly linked to Shining Path or MRTA". The protests, fueled by younger individuals who were not influenced by conservative governments and the armed forces were not affected by the terruqueo since they did not hold fearful memories from the historical conflict, with demonstrators often chanting "they messed with the wrong generation".

==== 2021 Peruvian elections ====
"When you go out to ask for rights, they say that you are a terrorist, ... I know the country and they will not be able to shut me up, ... The terrorists are hunger and misery, abandonment, inequality, injustice."

— Pedro Castillo, April 2021

The terruqueo attacks became even more frequent during the 2021 Peruvian general election when Daniel Urresti described Verónika Mendoza as "Terrónika" and supporters of Keiko Fujimori, daughter of Alberto Fujimori, attempted to link Pedro Castillo to terrorists. Even center-right political parties such as the Purple Party (Partido Morado) were described as "Moradef", likening the party to MOVADEF.

Terruqueos were most intense against Castillo; he was portrayed as a "communist threat" that would bring "terrorism" and humanitarian disaster similar to Venezuela. Media organizations in Peru would use the terruqueo along with fake news in an effort to support Fujimori. The Guardian described links to guerrilla groups such as the Shining Path as "incorrect", and the Associated Press said that allegations by Peruvian media of links to Shining Path were "unsupported". Conservative politician Rafael López Aliaga would reportedly call for death in two separate incidents; in May 2021 he allegedly chanted "Death to communism! Death to Cerrón! Death to Castillo!" to supporters and at the Respect My Vote rally that was organized by Willax TV owner Erasmo Wong Lu on 26 June 2021, he supposedly stated "Death to communism, get out of here, filthy communists, you have awakened the lion, to the streets!"

==== 2022–2023 Peruvian political protests ====
When the 2022–2023 Peruvian political protests occurred, right-wing groups and the government of Dina Boluarte used the terruqueo to label protesters as terrorists, providing an excuse for authorities to use violence with impunity. The Peruvian Armed Forces would use the tactic to describe protest groups and those who supported a new constitution as terrorists. Experts of the United Nations condemned its usage during the protests.

== Analysis ==
The narrative doesn’t have to be logical. It just needs to be emotive, ... The government needs a monster, to create moral panic. This just shows that memory is a battle.

— Eduardo González, Truth and Reconciliation sociologist

Analysts state that terruqueos are detrimental to democracy in Peru as they suppress ideas of various political groups and occasionally target human rights groups, promoting political polarization and ultimately political violence. The terruqueo appeals to fear present in Peruvians of older generations, with the tactic relying on the emotions of audience. According to Fernando Velásquez Villalba, terruqueos are a latent phenomenon that appear more frequently in times of crisis.

=== Political use ===
Using the terruqueo to threaten individuals with a status quo bias, leftist and progressive groups, along with human rights groups, have been targeted with the tactic. Attacks resulted in less support for left-wing groups in Peru, with Americas Quarterly writing that despite the Truth and Reconciliation Commission finding that left-wing groups distanced themselves and even prevented violence during the internal conflict, the groups were still seen disapprovingly in Peru.

=== Victimization ===
Former Christian People's Party politician Ántero Flores-Aráoz, addressing violent actions by demonstrators during the 2022–2023 protests against Dina Boluarte, argues that when the individuals involved in terror activities, including the arson of public and private buildings, or the attempts to attack airports, are deemed as "terrucos", some sectors — including international officials — reject the labelling of said individuals as such, considering the term as pejorative and "offensive". However, since Peruvian law defines terrorism as acts that create alarm or collective fear in population, therefore Flores-Aráoz argues that it's legitimate to call terrorists those involved in such actions.

=== Racism ===
The use of the terruqueo has specifically linked indigenous and "serrano" Peruvians to terrorism. In the book Buscando un inca, historian Alberto Flores Galindo wrote:

‘Senderista’ was replaced by ‘terrorist’ and this word became over time a synonym of “people from Ayacucho”, which in turn was equivalent to anyone who was Indian or mestizo, was poorly dressed, or made a deficient use of Spanish ... To be called “people from Ayacucho” was to admit to have incurred in the antiterrorist law. In this manner, the end of the war in 1984, became an onslaught of the western side of Peru against its Andean region.

United Nations experts condemned the fear mongering tactic, saying it was an act of intimidation that stigmatized human rights workers, indigenous individuals and rural groups. During the protests in 2023, Edgar Stuardo Ralón, Vice President of the Inter-American Commission on Human Rights (IACHR), stated that terruqueos created "an environment of permission and tolerance towards discrimination, stigmatization and institutional violence".

== See also ==
- Chilezuela
- McCarthyism
- Moral panic
- Red-baiting
- Red Scare
- Scapegoating
- Witch-hunt
