= Fernando Berckemeyer =

Peruvian journalist

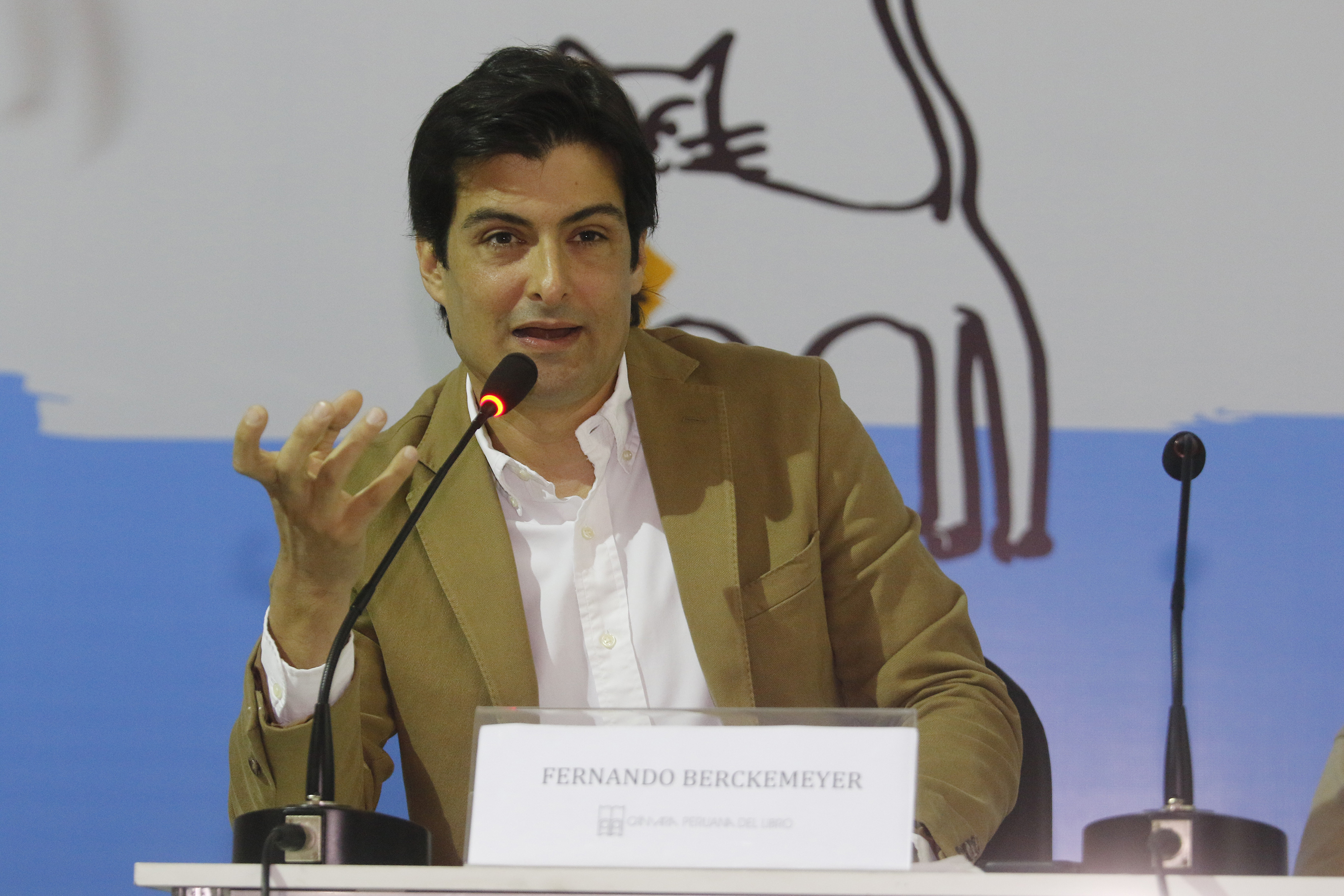
- Born: February 20, 1978 (age 48); Lima, Peru
- Education: Pontifical Catholic University of Peru (LL.B.); Harvard University (LL.M.); New York University (M.A.)
- Occupations: Editor-in-chief, El Comercio
- Notable credit(s): El Comercio, Peru.21, El Nuevo Herald

Fernando Berckemeyer Olaechea (born 20 February 1978) is a Peruvian journalist who served as editor-in-chief of El Comercio, Peru's oldest and most traditional newspaper, from 2014 to 2018, being the youngest to hold the position.

During his leadership at El Comercio, Berckemeyer was singled as one of the most powerful and influential leaders in Peru, and the most powerful individual in the written press, by the "Encuesta Poder" poll.

== Early life and education ==
Berckemeyer was born in Lima on 20 February 1978, the son of Fernando Berckemeyer Conroy and Ana María Olaechea Álvarez-Calderón. On his mother's side, he comes from a renowned family of jurists and politicians, most notably his great-grandfather, Manuel Pablo Olaechea, a Prime Minister of Peru in the late nineteenth century, and his grandfather, Finance Minister Manuel Augusto Olaechea. He is also the nephew of former President of Congress and vintner businessman, Pedro Olaechea Alvarez Calderon.

Upon completing his primary and secondary education at the Inmaculado Corazón and Santa María Marianistas schools in Lima, Berckemeyer was admitted to the Pontifical Catholic University of Peru, where he studied law. During his law school years, he founded the news portal Enfoque Derecho, and was Editor-in-Chief of the Thémis Law Review.

Subsequently, Berckemeyer pursued his graduate studies at Harvard Law School, where he obtained a Master of Laws (LL.M.) in 2004. Additionally, he completed a program in Philosophical Studies at the Pontifical Catholic University of Peru, and a Master of Arts in Ibero-American literature at New York University Global Campus in Madrid, Spain.

== Career ==
Following the completion of his law degree, Berckemeyer entered his family's law firm, Estudio Olaechea, in Lima, as a Senior Editor, and later on became an international associate at Shearman & Sterling in New York (2004-2005). During those years, he was involved in projects of the World Monuments Fund (WMF) in his country, and was part of the creation of the Peruvian chapter of the organization in 2014.

Since 2003, he has been a columnist for the opinion pages of El Comercio and Peru.21, and since 2004, for El Nuevo Herald of Miami.

=== El Comercio ===
In 2005, after a one-year stint as a columnist, Berckemeyer joined El Comercio as an editorial writer and as a member of its editorial committee under the direction of Alejandro Miró-Quesada Cisneros. In 2012, he returned to the newspaper as a central opinion editor, thus initiating a shift in the editorial line, leading towards political and economic liberalism, in contrast to the conservative line for which El Comercio has been known since its origins.

In 2014, upon the death of editor Fritz Du Bois, Berckemeyer assumed the position, becoming the youngest editor of the newspaper since its foundation in 1839, and initiating a process of internal reform that led to the departure of several of the most important editors. In 2015 and 2016, he was chosen by the "Encuesta Poder" national poll as the most powerful person in the written press, and as one of the two journalists who appeared on the list of the 21 most powerful and influential people in Peru.

Under Berckemeyer's leadership, El Comercio abandoned its traditional sheet format to adopt the Berlin one, and reopened its dissolved research unit. Subsequently, he was appointed Vice President of the Press Freedom Committee of the Inter-American Press Association.

In May 2018, he resigned from the position of editor-in-chief of El Comercio. He currently collaborates as a columnist for CNN.
