= Erasmo Wong Lu =

Peruvian civil engineer

- Born: 1943 (age 82–83); Lima, Peru
- Education: Universidad Nacional de Ingeniería (Civil Engineering)
- Occupation: Businessman
- Organization: Corporación E.Wong
- Parents: Erasmo Wong Chiang (father); Angela Lidia Lu Vega (mother)

Erasmo Jesús Rolando Wong Lu Vega is a Peruvian civil engineer and businessman. He is the current owner of Willax Televisión and the Shopping Centers Lima Plaza Norte and Mall del Sur.

== Early life and education ==
Erasmo Wong Lu, a Chinese Peruvian, was born in Lima in 1943. He was son of Erasmo Wong Chiang, a Chinese immigrant and entrepreneur and Angela Lu Vega, who owned a corner store-grocery and bazaar in the district of San Isidro in Lima. His father arrived in Peru at the age of eleven. As a child, Wong was kept busy with piano, accordion, shorthand and typing lessons. He lived in an apartment in the upper class San Isidro District, he helped his parents along with his brothers in the family store and attended the private school Colegio San Andrés.

For his university education, Wong graduated with a civil engineering degree from Universidad Nacional de Ingenieria and earned postgraduate degrees in management from University of Piura.

== Career ==
Wong and his brother Edgardo established a poultry farm and tended it for seventeen years. In 1983 together with his father and brothers, and with the vision of being the best store in Lima, they founded the supermarket chain Wong, Eventually, Erasmo Wong Jr. became the head of his family's supermarket chain, also opening the supermarket chain Metro that then employed over 8,000 employees, advancing the company past Chilean competitors. Under the government of Alberto Fujimori, which surrounded itself with many Asian collaborators, spanning into the period of China's growing presence in Peru during the early 21st century, Wong began to approach Chinese entrepreneurs and the elite in Peru, establishing a higher social status in the process. In 1992 he was recognized as The Entrepreneur of the Year by IPAE - Instituto Peruano de Administración de Empresas.

In December 2007, Wong supermarkets – which controlled sixty-two percent of Lima's grocery market at the time – was purchased from Wong's family by the Chilean retailer Cencosud for US$500 million. He still is a member of the Wong supermarket's board of directors.

Since moving away from supermarkets, Wong has become the head of E W Corporation, which established many enterprises in the British Virgin Islands and Panama. In November 2015, Wong purchased Willax Televisión, a television channel that has since been described as promoting conservative and right-wing political stances by international media outlets.

Perú.21 reported in 2019 that a group of Peruvian investors attempted to purchase the journalist branch of El Comercio Group in what was called "Operation Caledonia", with the operation reportedly receiving assistance of former mayor of New York City and Keiko Fujimori's former advisor, Rudy Giuliani. According to journalist Augusto Álvarez Rodrich, Wong was included in the Operation Caledonia group, Rafael López Aliaga and the Popular Force politician José Chlimper.

== Personal life ==
In 1999, Erasmo Wong Lu founded the Peruvian Chinese Association and its his currently President and also Director of its official magazine Integración. He lives in a home decorated with Chinese art. According to Look Lai and Tan, Wong had a net worth of US$500 million in 2010. He collects luxury cars, including various Porsche 911s, Ferraris, and a McLaren 720S.

Politically, he has been involved in promoting rallies for right-wing politicians in Peru, especially for Keiko Fujimori and Rafael López Aliaga during the 2021 Peruvian general election. He also funded Fujimori's campaign for the 2011 Peruvian general election. Wong Lu signed the Madrid Charter, a document drafted by the far-right Spanish party Vox that describes left-wing groups as enemies of Ibero-America involved in a "criminal project" that are "under the umbrella of the Cuban regime".
