= Ucayalina de Televisión =

- Ucayalina de Televisión logo
- Country: Peru
- Broadcast area: Ucayali
- Headquarters: Pucallpa

Programming
- Picture format: 480i SDTV

History
- Launched: 19 April 2004
- Founder: Nestor Rodriguez Ramirez
- Replaced: Global Televisión

Links
- Webcast: www.youtube.com/@ucayalinadetelevision7006/videos
- Website: radiusac.pe

Ucayalina de Televisión is a Peruvian free-to-air television channel based in the city of Pucallpa, in the Department of Ucayali, with regular transmissions since 2004. Since 2008 it has provided material from the news channel Enlace Nacional.

== History ==
Originally, the channel was launched in the 1990s as a booster channel of channel 13 of Lima, Global Televisión, together with local news bulletins. After the end of the contract with Global Televisión at the end of 2003, it converted into an independent channel and relaunched with the name "Ucayalina de Televisión" on April 19, 2004. Its personnel consisted of Marcel de Smedt, general producer; Juan Ramírez, director of press; and Gunter Paredes, cameraman.

Since 2012, it has transmitted the most long-lived program of the station, Nando Show y su mundo de clase A.

The channel generated disputes with Jorge Velásquez Portocarrero, regional president of Ucayali, for being spread in a sequence of channel 19 without his permission.
