= Señora K: ni víctima, ni heroína =

- Authors: Valerie Vásquez de Velasco, Ariana Lira, Beatriz Llanos and Mabel Huertas
- Language: Spanish
- Genre: Biography, non-fiction, politics
- Publisher: Página Once
- Publication date: 12 September 2020
- Publication place: Peru
- Media type: Softcover
- ISBN: 9786124818868

Señora K: ni víctima, ni heroína is a biography of Peruvian politician Keiko Fujimori written by four journalists; Valerie Vásquez de Velasco, Ariana Lira, Beatriz Llanos and Mabel Huertas. The authors wrote the book to neither glorify nor vilify Fujimori, recognizing the political polarization surrounding her, instead providing the reader with facts in order to make their own conclusions.

== Reception ==
In a review published in El Comercio, José Carlos Yrigoyen writes that Señora K "is a book determined to rescue us from the waters of that superficiality that usually distorts the image of Peruvian political leaders" and that the authors "build a careful portrait of the one who was about to be anointed as president and who caused our most turbulent institutional crisis so far this century."

Prior to the 2021 Peruvian general election, Radio Programas del Perú listed Señora K as an informative book to help voters in their "Books that help us choose" program. Crisol book stores in Peru also recommended the book to inform voters prior to the election.
