= Grupo ATV =

Peruvian media conglomerate

Andina de Radiodifusión S.A.C.
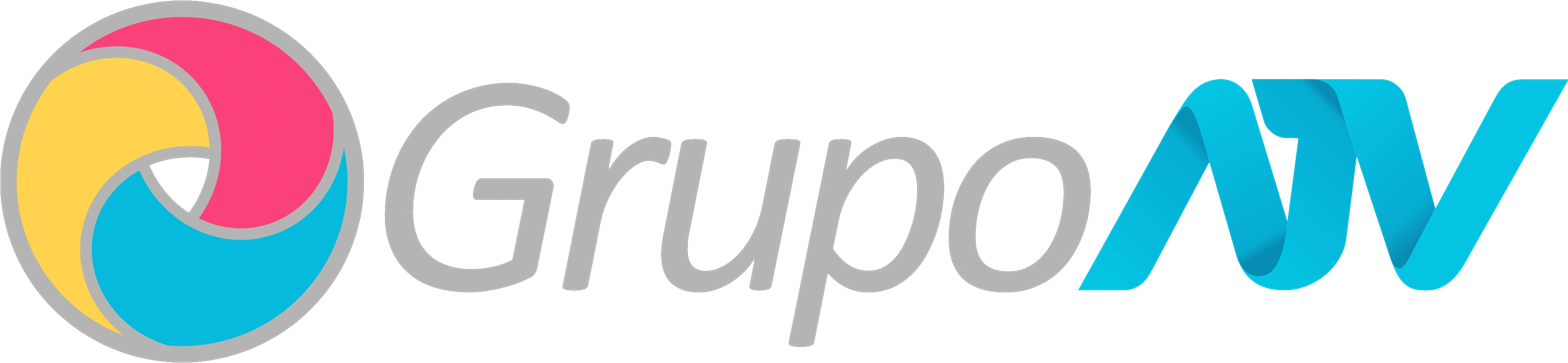
- Trade name: Grupo ATV
- Company type: Private
- Industry: Mass media
- Founded: 2006; 20 years ago
- Headquarters: Lima, Peru
- Area served: Peru
- Key people: Marcello Cuneo (Chairman and CEO)
- Products: Television
- Owner: Albavisión
- Number of employees: 300
- Website: atv.pe

Grupo ATV is a media conglomerate Peruvian television communication company created in 2006, which is owned by the Albavisión conglomerate, owned by Remigio Ángel González.

== History ==
=== The beginnings ===
The group began operations in 2006 when the Andina Television, or ATV (Channel 9), went on to manage the Red Global network, he was taken to the Peruvian broadcaster Genaro Delgado Parker in the same year for debt. Later in 2009, the historic music channel Uranio TV (Channel 15) was converted into a new channel called La Tele aimed at women with telenovelas in a six-hour daily cycle, with feature films only on weekends.

=== The following years ===
At the end of 2011, it bought the Arequipa channel Perú TV and relaunched it as ATV Sur. At the same time in Lima ATV decided to launch a new news channel, ATV+ noticias and also aired a musical test signal in 39 UHF channel of Lima. According to a press release published on the website tuteve.tv, it screened flipping by 2013 a new channel with programming aimed at young audiences. However, the project was shelved and the animated series and youth became his daily schedule another channel Global Television.

On March 24, 2012, the first ATV Cup was held in a sports field Surquillo where workers attended and public figures. In April, the group signed an agreement with the mayor of Huari to transmit the channel ATV in this town via the signal 23 of Radio Television Huari.

In May 2012, the group claimed through judicial action of ATV Sur against RBC TV obtain the frequency 11 Lima. Coincidentally on Channel 39 UHF began to see the id of Uranio TV in 2006 he did materialize assume that judicial action was going to see the musical signal on channel 11. However, a few days later after the Ministry of Transport and Communications of Peru RBC ratified on channel 11 of Lima, the ATV group withdrew missing wedge channel Uranio TV, leaving the channel UHF 39 until 2014 without any identification and contradicting the statement by officials of ATV Sur, Group ATV denied any interest in channel 11.

Besides its two main channels were the first in the national ranking more attuned, for the triumph of Kina Malpartida in boxing and the final of the Champions League football in 19 mayo.

It also broadcast live matches Euro 2012, in its 3 channels simultaneously on ATV, ATV+ Noticias and Global TV, from June.

From November 1 to November 10, three of the four channels that make up this cluster Peru had the rights to broadcast the Bolivarian Beach Games 2012, which took place in the country.

=== Present ===
In mid-October 2014 decided to take off the air the music channel continued in 39 UHF to Lima and replaced by version 39.1 HD, ATV Norte News Channel ATV+ noticias HD in subchannel 8.1, while the 8.2 began to see the classical music channel arpeggio Argentina. They launched the new channel ATV Norte, in the city of Trujillo.

In addition to re-launch the Global TV as Red TV from April 2015 and will be venturing into the world of broadcasting, that's what possibly buy the CRP Medios y Entretenimiento to acquire and manage its radio stations. Grupo ATV has plans for 2020 and beyond which will include a rebranding of the América Next channel to Global Televisión.

== Television channels ==
- ATV
- Global
- ATV+
- ATV Sur
- La Tele
