= Canal N =

- Type: Pay television channel
- Country: Peru

Programming
- Language: Spanish
- Picture format: 1080i HDTV

Ownership
- Owner: América Multimedia

History
- Launched: 4 July 1999

Links
- Website: canaln.pe

Canal N is a Peruvian pay television news channel. It was founded as a joint venture between El Comercio and Telefónica. The channel is exclusively available through Movistar TV.

Although CCN and Cable Mágico Noticias were the first Peruvian news channels, Canal N established itself as the only permanent media outlet with local and national coverage in the 2000s, until the arrival of competitors such as ATV+ and RPP TV.

== History ==
Canal N was conceived in 1997 by journalist Bernardo Roca Rey during the Japanese embassy hostage crisis in Lima. To realize this concept, a commercial partner was required. Gilberto Hume emerged as a suitable partner, whom Rey had encountered at a beach.

"A whole afternoon making ceviche in a jar with plenty of pisco, and then we continued thinking about it and the idea matured," said Hume. The directives of El Comercio (later formed as El Comercio Producciones), after giving approval to the idea, entered the television industry with a small store located on Madrid Street in Miraflores. Inspired by CNN, initially it competed against Cable Canal de Noticias, owned by Expreso, which was the only news channel in Peru. El Comercio started advertising Canal N to the public in 1998 in PC World magazine, an American magazine whose local version was produced by the newspaper. Later, advertisements for the channel appeared on Cable Mágico's magazine for the subscribers of the cable operator. The advertisement included a photo of the studios of the channel and the phrase El Perú minuto a minuto. After several months of technical and labor adjustments, Canal N launched in test mode on Canal Mágico in April 1999, initially available only to subscribers of the adult channel package.

At the same time, on Cable Mágico's channel 8, which was previously occupied by the struggling Brazilian network Rede Manchete, Canal N's logo appeared. The logo featured a rotating 3D letter N on a black background accompanied by background music, signaling the channel's upcoming availability on that frequency. Canal N was officially launched at 8 am on 4 July 1999.
