= ATV (Peruvian TV channel) =

Peruvian broadcast television network

Andina de Televisión
- Type: Television network
- Country: Peru

Programming
- Picture format: 1080i HDTV

Ownership
- Owner: Grupo ATV (Albavision)

History
- Launched: 1959 (as TV El Sol); April 18, 1983; 43 years ago (current incarnation)
- Former names: Canal 9 (1983-1992)

Links
- Website: www.atv.pe

Availability

Terrestrial
- Analog VHF: Channel 9 (Lima, listings may vary)
- Digital VHF: Channel 9.1 (Lima, listings may vary)

ATV (known as Andina de Televisión) is a Peruvian television network founded in 1959 and relaunched in 1983. The network is the flagship property of Grupo ATV, one of Peru's largest media and broadcasting companies.

== History ==
What is known today as ATV started in 1959 as TV El Sol Canal 9 with Alfonso Pereyra as its first manager. El Sol also had relay stations in Huacho on channel 7 and Ica on channel 11. After unsuccessful attempts to run it in the early 1970s and subsequent political turmoil in Peru, the station was closed; however, it became a TV Perú local station for the Lima metropolitan area.

By 1981, the channel was under new leadership. Carlos Tizón Pacheco, who financed the 1980 presidential campaign of President Fernando Belaúnde Terry, and then-president of local auto firm PROMASA, took over the channel frequency with his firm Andina de Radiodifusión, S.A., with test broadcasting commencing on May 9 the same year. After two years the channel returned to broadcasting on April 18, 1983, with President Terry presiding.

Since then the station has quickly gained a Peruvian audience by showing foreign films and broadcasting dramas, usually from Brazil. Until 1992 the station was known as Canal 9 (Channel 9), after its Lima, Peru VHF frequency, up until 1986 it had only been a local station, with national broadcasting starting only in 1987.

Canal 9's broadcasts began on April 18, 1983, cwhen it was inaugurated at a house at Arequipa Avenue, in the district of San Isidro by president Fernando Belaúnde Terry, and by the archbishop of Lima, Juan Landazuri Ricketts who blessed the new channel after a large advertising campaign and broadcasting a test signal for three months.

Canal 9 quickly gained audience and popularity, showing during its initial decade a varied schedule consisting of feature films (after the opening ceremony it aired American Graffiti), first-run American series such as MacGyver or Hunter; successful Venezuelan telenovelas such as Las Amazonas, Cristal or La dama de rosa and animated series such as Sandybelle, The Flintstones, The Jetsons y Dungeons & Dragons.

Regarding original productions, the channel obtained good reception from the viewing audience, with programs such as El dedo, current affairs programs Esta Noche by Gonzalo Rojas, Documento and Uno más uno by Fernando Ampuero, musical program Hits del Momento by Miguel Millaand its news programs presented by Aldo Morzán, María Teresa Braschi, Gonzalo Iwasaki, Suzie Sato and the deceased journalist María Claudia Zavalaga.

In 1985, the channel was acquired by the Vera Gutiérrez brothers.

In 1986, Canal 9 associates with PROA (Productores Asociados S.A.) of Francisco J. Lombardi producing its first dramatic production, in January: the telenovela Bajo tu piel (1986), later in the middle of the year Malahierba (1986-1987). Later Paloma (1988) and finally Kiatari, buscando la luna (1989).

During 1987, the station started its nationwide expansion by associating with two companies that broadcast television signals in the Peruvian inland: Norperuana de Radiodifusión, S.A (currently Sol TV, based in Trujillo) and CRASA, whose main station was Canal 8 Arequipa (currently ATV Sur) and was the owner of several stations in the south of the country. This way, both regional networks aired a large part of Canal 9's programming to the inland region.

In 1989, Carlos Tizón sold his shares at Andina de Radiodifusión S.A. to businessman Julio Vera Gutiérrez, who took on the control of Canal 9 in Lima. His wife, Graciela Abad and later the sons of Julio Vera started taking in directive positions at the channel.

In April 1990, Fuego cruzado started, Mariella Balbi and Eduardo Guzmán's original debate program. It was the first Peruvian talk-show which used the modern American format by gathering in the studio set a group of people facing a controversial topic and, live, discussing around it. Invitees had to be functional to the discussion and its production team was no stranger to scandal. Fuego cruzado, which was on air for five years, enabled the channel's manager, Federico Anchorena, to become a pioneer in the new phase of Peruvian Television with formats ahead of its time.

In 1991, Canal 9, alongside Backus y Johnston, decided to produce miniseries, the first of which being Regresa, a miniseries based on the life of Lucha Reyes which caused controversy in the Peruvian artistic scene. It was followed by La Perricholi in 1992, and in 1993 Bolero and Tatán, which were the last miniseries produced in this phase.

On January 14, 1992, due to the interconnection via satellite at the national level, the then denominated Channel 9 changes its name to ATV (abbreviation of Andina de Televisión).

The station is among the most watched television stations in Peru, often obtaining high ratings from past TV shows such as Magaly TV, a magazine and gossip show hosted by Peruvian journalist Magaly Medina.

== ATV HD ==
In November 2006, the Peruvian Minister of Transports and Communications published in the Peruvian government's official newspaper "El Peruano" a decree concerning Digital terrestrial television. In April 2007, ATV started to test their HD channel with American ATSC system on channel 30. Then when Peru adopted ISDB-T years later, ATV began testing ISDB-T broadcasts in the capital in September 2009. ATV's HD signal was officially released on March 31, 2010, 1 day after TV Perú, being the first Peruvian private television network to do so.

== Programming ==
ATV programming is varied and tries to attend to all agrees and cultural groups within Peru. Among their usual programming is a morning show called "Que Tal Mañana!" hosted by Laura Borlini and comedians Fernando Armas and Hernan Vidaurre; soap operas such as Pasión de Gavilanes, El Color del Pecado or El Cuerpo del Deseo; news shows which include the daily "Primera Noticia", ATV Noticias and El Deportivo and the Sunday's Dia D; folkloric shows like Canto Andino; a movie reviews show called De Película; a toddler-oriented programme called "Tu Bebe". It also broadcasts WWE shows RAW and Smackdown and its monthly pay per views. In January 2013, they started to broadcast Pablo Escobar: El Patrón del Mal, followed by El Señor de los Cielos in 2014.

== Sports events ==
- UEFA Champions League
- Olympic Games
- FIFA World Cup qualification

== Logos ==
1983–1992

1992–1998

1998–2000

2000 (with slight modifications until 2014)

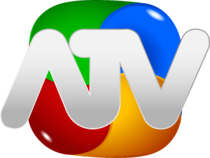
2014–2016

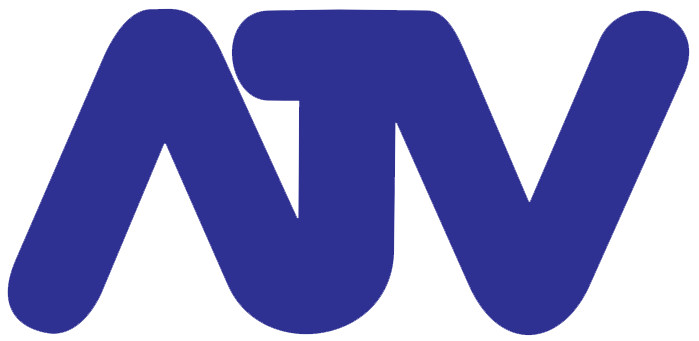
2016–2017

2017–2018

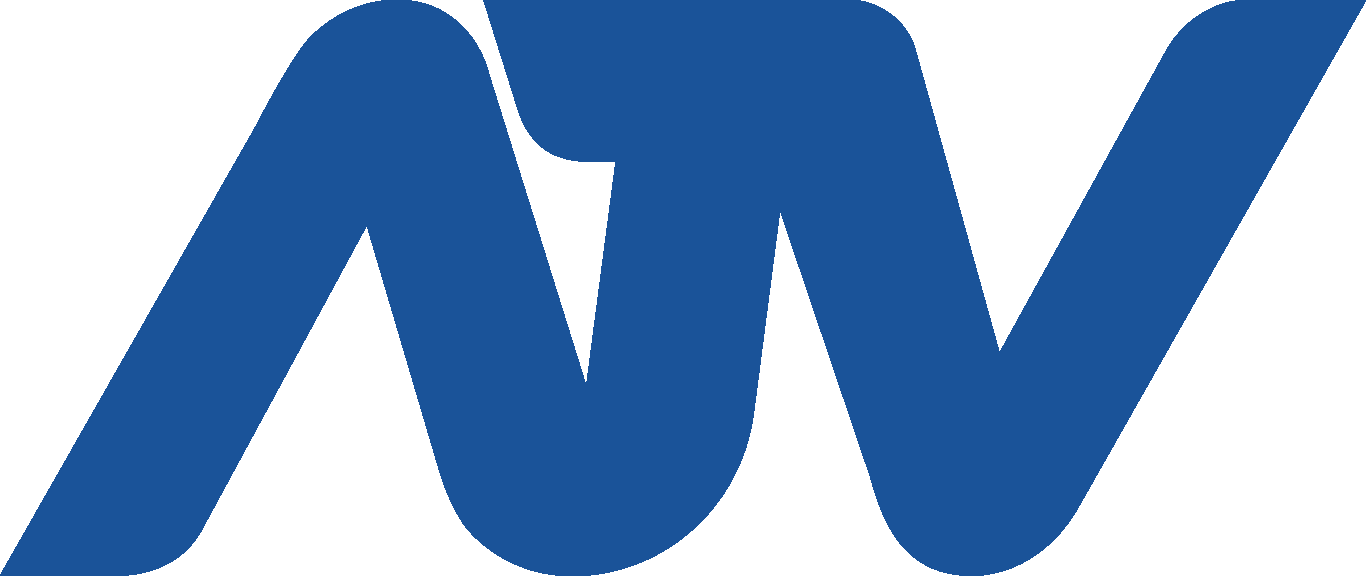
2018–2025

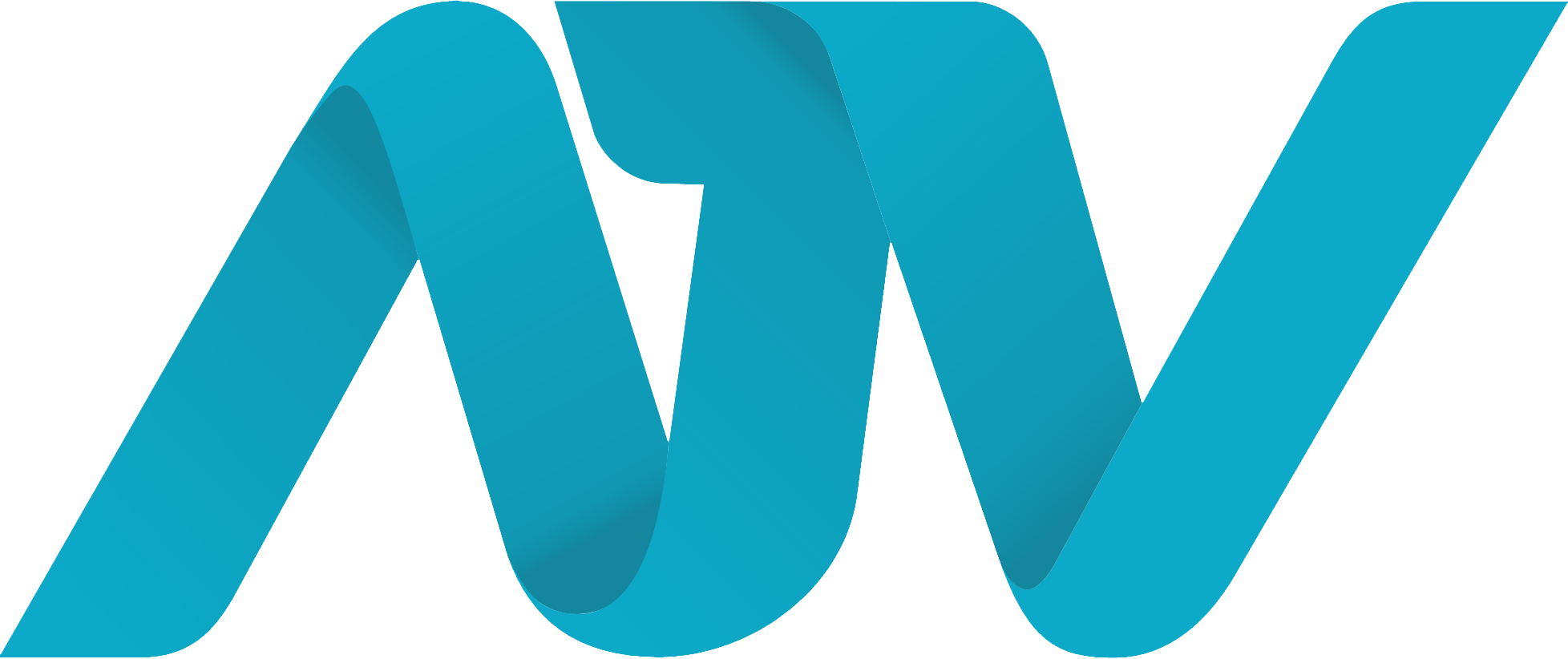
2020–2025

2025–present
