= Manuel Delgado Parker =

Peruvian entrepreneur (1936–2019)

- Born: 18 November 1936; Lima, Peru
- Died: 16 September 2019 (aged 82)
- Occupation: Media entrepreneur
- Known for: Founder of Grupo RPP
- Spouse: Frida Nachtigall Valderrama

Manuel Delgado Parker (18 November 1936 – 16 September 2019) was a Peruvian entrepreneur who founded the media conglomerate Grupo RPP.

== Biography ==
Manuel was the fifth son of Peruvian businessman Genaro Delgado Brandt and Rachel Parker Murguía.

He married Frieda Nachtigall Valderrama in 1960, and with her had their children Frida, Ursula, Manuel, Claudia, Hugo and Natalia Delgado Nachtigall.

== Business activity ==
He joined Radio Panamericana in the fifties, as part of the administration of that radio station founded by his father at the beginning of the fifties.

Then he founded Radio Programas del Peru, a nation-wide radio station dedicated to the national transmission of radio-drama programs, services, and counseling.

He held the management of Panamericana Televisión from 1968 to 1971, when the Military Government took control of the media. In the years following he lived in Buenos Aires, Puerto Rico and Los Angeles, California.

Manuel returned from the US in 1979 and assumed leadership of RPP. As such he would initiate the Information Center, space which would serve to reach more people through the wide dissemination of news; this program still characterizes this radio station today.

In 1990 Manuel founded the Society of Latin America Broadcasting, made up of the main radio networks of Ecuador, Colombia, Venezuela Bolivia and Argentina. He was responsible for leading Panamericana Televisión during the nineties and remained as the main shareholder of this channel until he sold his shares to boost the formation of RPP Group, a company which he currently manages. In addition, he founded in the US, together with his brother Hector Delgado Parker, the international Peruvian television network Sur Perú, aimed at the Peruvian community in that country.

== See also ==
- Radio Programas del Perú
- Grupo RPP
