= CPN Radio =

Peruvian radio network

CPN Radio logo

CPN Radio (Spanish: Cadena Peruana de Noticias) was a Peruvian radio broadcaster with national coverage in Peru. It was founded in 1996. Early in the decade of 2000 was the main competitor of RPP (Radio Programas del Perú), but declined at the end of the decade. Finally, because of economic problems radio ownership changed, but failed to get solvent. Following those circumstances was forced to stop broadcasting in 2011 and was replaced by a romantic music station.

== See also ==
- List of radio stations in Peru
- Media of Peru
