= Chilezuela =

Pejorative Chilean term

Chilezuela is a pejorative Chilean term to describe a dystopian version of Chile with negative attributes similar to those of Bolivarian Venezuela. The term gained traction in the 2017 Chilean presidential election when supporters of right-wing candidate Sebastián Piñera applied it to what they claimed was a path towards crisis and underdevelopment. During the campaign rumors of Nicolás Maduro supporting Chilean centre-left candidate Alejandro Guillier spread through social media of groups of exiled Venezuelans. Piñera himself sought to link Guillier to Maduro in a negative context. The term is part of a wide trend in the Spanish-speaking world of doing negative references to Venezuela during political campaigns. This and similar terms such as, Argenzuela, Peruzuela and venezuelización are used during political campaigns to claim what will supposedly happen if the left-wing candidate wins.

Under the second presidency of Sebastián Piñera, the success of "Chilezeula" rhetoric led to new visa policies leading to the deportation of hundreds of thousands of Venezuelans and Haitians.

== See also ==
- Facho pobre
- Terruqueo
