= Augusto Álvarez Rodrich =

Peruvian economist and journalist

- Born: Augusto Aníbal Álvarez Rodrich; 12 October 1959 (age 66); Lima, Peru

Academic background
- Education: Universidad del Pacífico (BA); Harvard University (MPA)

Academic work
- Discipline: Economics; Journalism

Augusto Aníbal Álvarez Rodrich (born 12 October 1959) is a Peruvian economist and journalist who works in print, radio and television.

== Early life and education ==
Rodrich was born in Lima, Peru. He earned a bachelor's degree in economics at the Universidad del Pacífico before earning a Master of Public Administration from the John F. Kennedy School of Government at Harvard University. He also studied specialised courses at Stanford University, the University of Manchester and Northwestern University.

== Career ==
He worked for Grupo Apoyo from 1980 until 2002, reaching the position of General Director of Apoyo Communications and editor of the magazines Perú Económico, Semana Económica and Debate. He was also Director of Apoyo Opinion and Market and the Apoyo Institute.

He became Vice President of the Commission for Market Entry and Exit at Indecopi, Vice President of OSIPTEL and Director of Interbank. He also participated as adviser of projects for multilateral organisations and various processes of privatisation in Peru, Colombia and Guatemala.

He has been director of the daily Perú.21 since its foundation until November 2008, and anchor of the radio programme Ampliación de Noticias (news in depth, Radio Programas del Perú, RPP) and associate professor at the University of the Pacific. He was director and anchor of the television programme Dos Dedos de Frente (Spanish expression for "common sense", Frecuencia Latina). As of 2014 he has a column in La República.

He moderated the debate between Alan García and Ollanta Humala in the 2006 Peruvian general election.

== Books ==
Álvarez is the author of various books and academic essays (in Spanish) on privatisation, the public sector and state reform:

- Perú, 1964-1994: Economía, Sociedad y Política, 1995
- La implementación de políticas públicas en el Perú (editor), 1995
- El Poder en el Perú (editor), 1993
- Principios de Empresas Estatales y Privatización, 1992
- Empresas Estatales y Privatización: Cómo reformar la actividad empresarial del Estado en el Perú, 1991
- Negociación Económica Internacional: La Experiencia del Perú, 1990
- Los Objetivos de las Empresas Estatales, 1985.
