= ATV Jordan =

Jordanian television channel

ATV
- Type: Broadcast television system
- Country: Jordan
- Availability: Middle East, Europe
- Owner: Arab Telemedia
- Launch date: January 2009

ATV (Jordanian United TV Broadcasting Company PLC) is Jordan's first independent TV channel started its pilot broadcast and signal testing as of July 23, 2007. The channel is broadcasting through Nilesat 102 on a frequency of 12303H¾.

ATV was founded by Mohamad Alayyan, a Jordanian business man who has invested in Jordan's media scene including alghad daily, Al-Waseet classified paper, in addition to several magazines and FM radio stations.

ATV announced earlier 2008 that it will go public, making it the first satellite station in the Arab world to do so.

On 4 September 2007, ATV launched some of its shows on ikbis.com.
