= Anguilla Television =

Anguillan television channel

- The Valley; Anguilla
- Channels: Digital: 9
- Branding: ATV

Ownership
- Owner: West Indies International Network

Anguilla Television (ATV), also known as ATV3 due to its cable frequency (channel 3), is a terrestrial television channel in the British overseas territory of Anguilla.

== History and programming ==
It is unknown when did ATV start broadcasting. It started at an unknown period before 1995 on channel 3 on cable and over-the-air on channel 9. That year, the TV and radio stations serving Anguilla were destroyed by Hurricane Luis, but resumed its broadcasts shortly afterwards, at a later date. By April 1997, it had resumed its regular service, holding the Leeward Islands Debating Competition. It also carried Digest, carrying events in Anguilla and adjacent islands, a nightly news bulletin produced by Radio Anguilla at 7:40pm and Anguilla Diary at 8:05pm. Some programmes were shown on ATV's over-the-air signal on channel 9, which was not available on cable.

In addition to its local programming, the channel also airs syndicated Caribbean programmes such as Caribbean Medical.

As of 2015, Wycliffe Richardson was part of the channel's team.
