= Global Televisión (Peruvian TV network) =

Peruvian national television network

Global Television
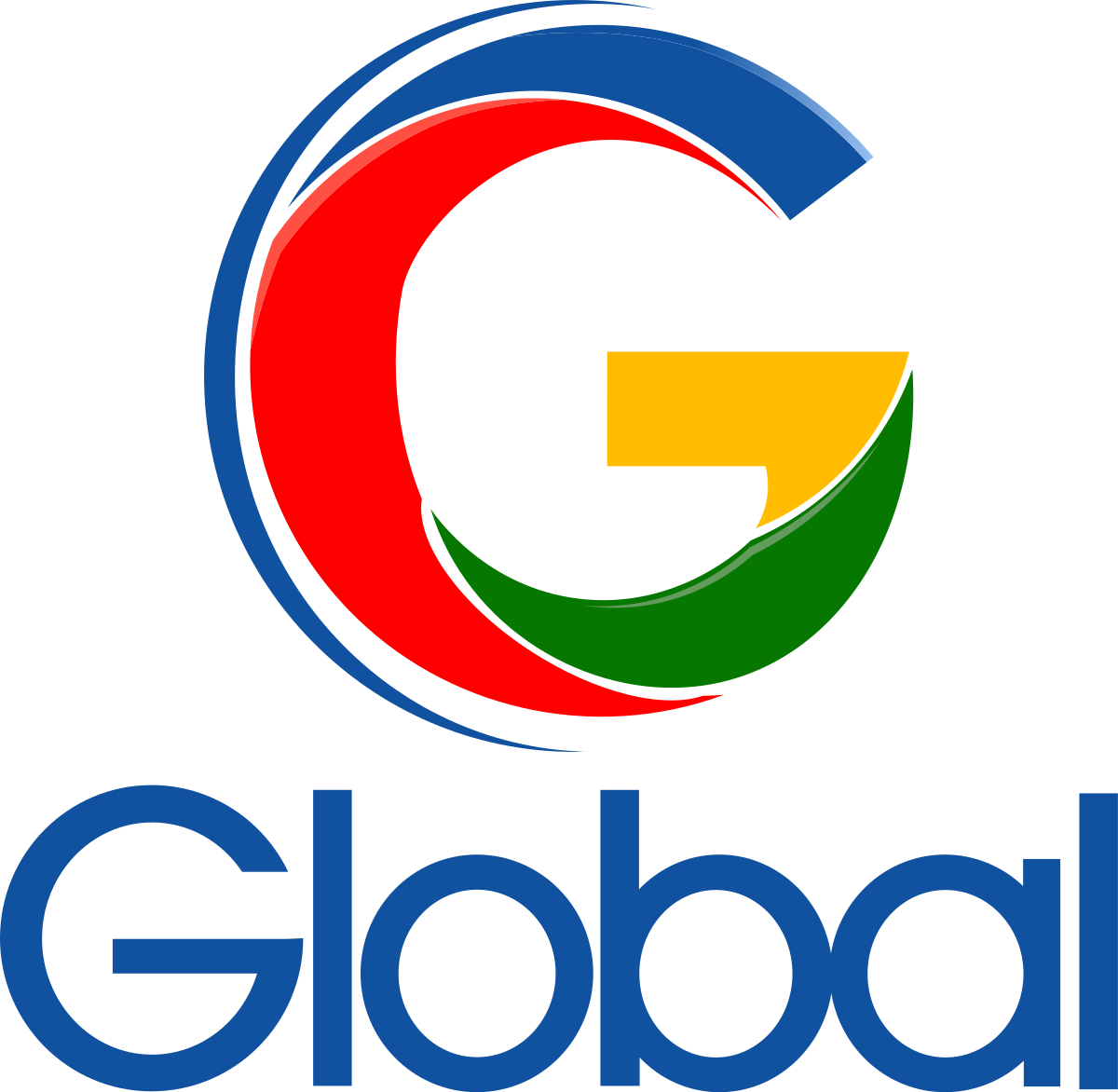
- Country: Peru
- Broadcast area: Peru
- Headquarters: Lima

Programming
- Language: Spanish
- Picture format: 1080i HDTV

Ownership
- Owner: Grupo ATV (Albavisión)

History
- Launched: 15 April 1989; 37 years ago (original channel); 1 December 2019; 6 years ago (relaunched channel)
- Replaced: Stereo 33 Televisión (1986–1989); América Next (2017–2019)
- Closed: 13 April 2015; 11 years ago (original channel)
- Former names: Canal 13 (1989–1991); Red Global Televisión (1998–1999; 2000-2006; 2006-2007; 2007–2010); Red Global de Noticias (2000–2006)

Availability

Terrestrial
- Analog VHF: channel 13 (Lima, listings may vary)
- Digital VHF: channel 13.1 (Lima, listings may vary)

Global Televisión (known as Global), is a television network owned by Grupo ATV that transmits all throughout Peru. It was founded in 1986 and is one of the six networks with national coverage.

In 1998, Julio Vera Abad and other businessmen contested their rights over the station, which led to a series of judicial litigations that extended for over ten years. Over time, the station fell under the hands of Albavisión under Grupo ATV, process that ended in 2011. Since then, the channel went past a series of naming and programming changes.

== History ==
The Channel 13 frequency ranging between 210 and 216 MHz (NTSC-M system) in Lima was initially operated by Panamericana Televisión that remained at that frequency until 1965, when it changed to frequency of channel 5 (76-82 MHz). Later that frequency was assigned to the University of Lima and donation of equipment by Panamericana Televisión, "Panamericana de Teleducación - Canal 13" is founded, which operated the frequency until 1974, when the military government of Juan Velasco Alvarado decided to close.

In 1983, with a discrete advertising campaign in Lima, Favorita de Televisión - Canal 13 announced the start of its operations for 1984 but never materialized.

By late 1985 and early 1986, Compañía Radiodifusora Univisión S.A. (unrelated to US Hispanic network Univisión, at the time still known as SIN) launched a test signal for a few months. Its programming as a test signal carried feature films and a one-minute news summary (Micronoticiero), in addition to a half-hour main bulletin (Edición Central), with the clear intention of giving its news team a warm-up. Conversations were also established with actors from the media for the realization of future national series and soap operas. Its studios were located on the first block of Av. Grau, where the Vía Expresa begins; in a seven-story building, which looks abandoned and until a few years ago, kept its transmission antenna.

Due to problems in the importing of its equipment, the Peruvian government withdraws the operating license of the nascent company. Finally, it will be assigned to Empresa Radiodifusora 1160 S.A. in 1989, which operated Stereo 33 Televisión to relaunch said station as Canal 13.

On 1 July 1986, it started broadcasting on UHF channel 33 as Stereo 33 Televisión, using the then-new stereo technology. The switch to VHF channel 13 happened at the start of 1989 and, in 1990, it was sold to Vittorio de Ferrari. During this transitory phase, it was known as Canal 13.

The name Global Televisión was adopted in 1991 in time for the launch of their satellite connections in order to cover the whole country. It wasn't considered a "hot" (popular) channel and most of their programming was imported content. In 1995, Vittorio de Ferrari signs a deal with Antena 3 and started to show their productions as well as imported films and cartoons. Following the death the channel's owner, his son, Roberto de Ferrari, revokes the contract with Antena 3 and sold it to Genaro Delgado Parker. The name changed to Red Global. At this stage, it showed programming from his production company, Astros. Said production company and Julio Vera Abad entered a dispute over the ownership of the channel over payment issues. In July of that year, Genaro and Vera Abad confronted each other at the entrance of Astros, suspending all newscasts on the channel.

In 1997, Global Televisión vía channel 13 in Lima, 45 in Arequipa and 30 in Cuzco broadcast live or delayed & exclusive Copa Libertadores with Sporting Cristal matches only (only for Perú).

Cesar Hildebrandt briefly involved with the channel in 2001, but after discovering a Vladivideo (home videos where Vladimiro Montesinos bribed politicians and owners of companies) where Genaro negotiated Hildebrandt's maintenance with Montesinos, he quickly left.

The channel was sold in 2006 to Corpecon, a company associated with Albavisión-owned ATV, under the intention to revert the channel's crisis. Genaro Delgado Parker left Red Global by selling the remaining 50% to Grupo ATV.

Having assumed complete control of the channel, their headquarters move to a location adjacent to the main headquarters of ATV, and rebranded it in November 2010 as Global TV. Under the new administration, the channel became heavily reliant on imported content, similar to many other Albavisión channels in countries where it operates more than one channel.

On 13 April 2015, the channel was replaced by Red TV. All the children and youth programming moved to UHF channel La Tele.

On 27 March 2017, Red TV was renamed NexTV, introducing a new schedule with emphasis on local productions, aimed at a younger demographic. In a later phase, the rebranded channel would produce its own television series. The new format was seen as a counterweight to the larger channels, which were increasingly focused on gossip. In September 2018, the channel associated itself with América Televisión and rebranded the channel as América Next. Due to Grupo ATV’s brand license agreement with América Televisión expiring and the network being faced with low ratings, the network became Global Televisión on December 1, 2019. However, América and ATV's syndication deal expired one year later.

== Programs ==
Global doesn't produce its own programming as of 2022, and has a format similar to secondary channels owned by the Albavisión group, relying heavily on foreign content.
