= Sol TV =

Peruvian regional television network

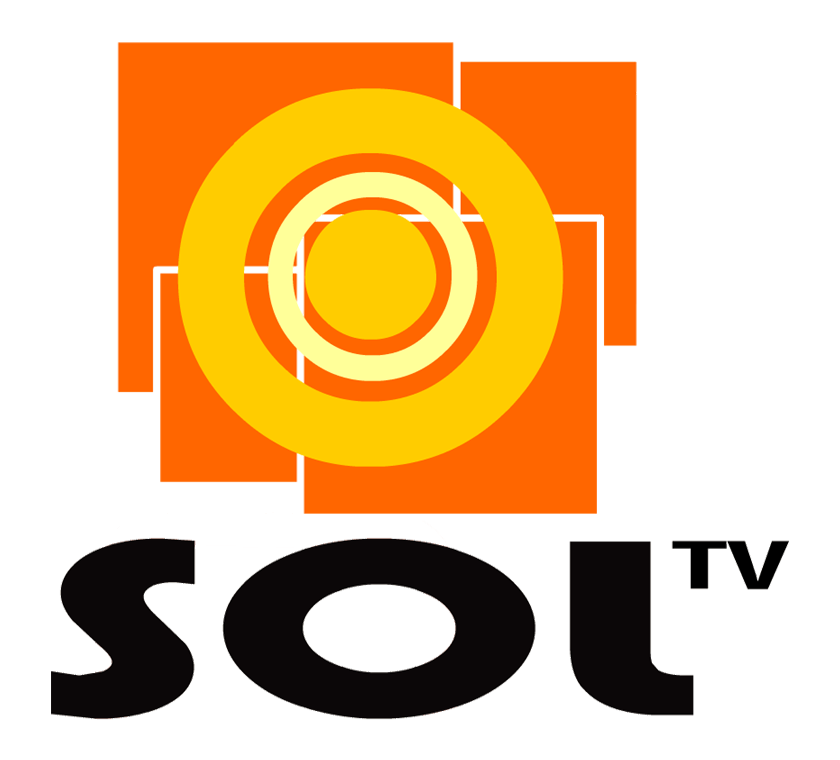
- Country: Peru
- Headquarters: Trujillo, Peru

Ownership
- Owner: Cruzado Saucedo family

History
- Launched: February 4, 2003
- Founder: Juan Ricardo Cruzado Saucedo

Links
- Website: www.soltvperu.com (in Spanish)

Availability

Terrestrial
- VHF: Channel 10 (Pacasmayo); Channel 13 (Virú)
- UHF: Channel 14 (Chepén); Channel 15 (Cajamarca); Channel 21 (Trujillo); Channel 25 (Huaraz); Channel 27 (Chiclayo); Channel 35 (Tumbes); Channel 53 (Piura)

Sol TV is a Peruvian television station, which transmits its signal since 2003, from Trujillo city for Peru. The channel belongs to the company Cruzado Saucedo. It was the first regional channel airing in the city of Trujillo.

== History ==
Sol TV is one of the most watched channels on regional television. Since 2003, more than 20 years without interruption, was the first channel to air in the city of Trujillo. Transmits and sponsors the "International Spring Festival," the "Marinera Festival", etc. This channel has also a programming including news important as presidential and municipal elections, movies and local programs, etc.

== See also ==
- Trujillo
- Victor Larco District
