= Uranio TV =

Defunct Peruvian television channel

- Country: Peru
- Broadcast area: Nationwide

Programming
- Language: Spanish
- Picture format: 480i SDTV

Ownership
- Owner: Alliance S.A.C. Albavisión (at closing time)

History
- Launched: November 21, 1994; 31 years ago
- Closed: August 15, 2008
- Replaced by: La Tele

Availability

Terrestrial
- Analog UHF: Channel 15 (Lima)

Uranio TV was a Peruvian over-the-air television channel whose programming consisted of video clips of various genres.

== History ==
The channel was launched on November 21, 1994, as Uranio 15 on channel 15 of the UHF band in Lima. It was founded by Julio Vera Abad, and was operated by the company Alliance S.A.C. until its closure. Its programming was made up of video clips of various genres, which were broadcast in both English and Spanish. The station gave preference to fashionable groups and artists. Its daily broadcasts ended at 8:00 p.m.; From that time on, it began to broadcast international programs such as Videomatch, Black power, El show de Yuly, Uranio en la noticia and the adult programs Cueros and Cuerpos Calientes.

Between 1998 and 2002, Uranio 15 gained fame for including emerging Peruvian cumbia artists in its musical offering. Uranio resorted to the format of home videos produced for artists in exchange for promoting them commercially. On December 6, 1999, Uranio 15 changed its programming and presented a new slogan: "Look how it sounds". In addition, it added Quality Products telesales spaces and repetitions of certain programs between 6:00 a.m. and 7:00 p.m. and 11:00 a.m. The station had VJs, including Óscar Gayoso, Raúl Francia and Chris Milligan; while on Sundays it included an interview slot.

In 2001, the channel was relaunched as Uranio TV and included more genres in its programming, such as merengue, salsa, bachata, tecno, Eurodance, pachanga, children's music, among others.

Between 2003 and 2005, Uranio TV began to lay off its VJs and refocused its programming again on fashionable genres, which at that time were axé, reggaeton, Latin pop, pop and alternative rock. By 2006, the channel began to promote voting for video clips by SMS. In 2007, in the middle of the year, with the massification of Peruvian cumbia, Uranio TV began to rebroadcast old video clips of cumbia and tecnocumbia in concert.

Uranio TV officially ceased broadcasting on August 15, 2008, without prior notice. A few months later, that same year, the station began broadcasting on a test signal without a commercial name, transmitting old videos automatically and without an announcer. After the purchase of Grupo ATV by Albavisión, the channel was relaunched as La Tele on January 7, 2009, as a test station, with programming refocused on telenovelas focused on female audiences.

It reappeared in November 2012, through channel 39 UHF, temporarily, during the dispute between Grupo ATV and RBC Televisión over channel 11 of the VHF band in Lima. According to ATV officials, the Group planned to take over frequency 11 and use it to relaunch Uranio TV, since it had previously rented the signal through CRASA (currently, ATV Sur). However, once the Supreme Court rules in favor of RBC, Uranio TV permanently disappears and its signal on channel 39 UHF is used to launch the ATV+ channel within Lima's digital terrestrial television, on virtual subchannel 8.1.

== Programming ==
- Café con Leche
- El ranking
- Los especiales
- Retro Mix
- Zona Pop
- La rapihora interctiva
- Sector 15
- En Línea Musical
- Retro Domingos
- Las + Pedidas
- A toda música
- El estelar
- Cocktail latino
- Loquekieras.com
- Lo + Top
- Los titanes de la cumbia
- El ranking de Uranio 15
- Recordando con Uranio 15
- 100.1
- Atajo
- Educación y democracia
- En persona (1997, with César Hildebrandt, simulcast with ATV)
- Alto nivel
- Maestra vida (2004, with Luis Delgado Aparicio)

=== Interstitial programming ===
- Mundo de la música
- El boom americano
- Video estreno
- El #1 del ranking
