= Radio Programas del Perú =

- Lima, Peru; Peru
- Broadcast area: Peru
- Frequency: 730 kHz 89.7 MHz

Programming
- Language: Spanish
- Format: Commercial radio

Ownership
- Owner: Grupo RPP

History
- First air date: October 7, 1963
- Former frequencies: 985 kHz

Links
- Website: rpp.pe

Radio Programas del Perú (RPP) is a radio and television broadcasting company in Peru within the Grupo RPP formed in Lima in 1963 by Manuel Delgado Parker and Emilio Checa. RPP has the largest radio coverage in Peru, covering 97 percent of the country.

== History ==
Originally an entertainment station focusing on radio dramas, it switched to news radio format in 1978. In 1997, the network changed its identification symbol to RPP, the initials of its name. RPP can be heard in real time on the Internet and can be seen on cable television through Movistar TV on the RPP News channel, launched on January 31, 2011. Their most popular show is ADN with Patricia del Rio and Fernando Carvallo.

== Internet station ==
The RPP website www.rpp.com.pe was launched in late 1996 by the initiative of Frida Delgado, who created the Internet site. In 2000, RPP implemented a technical and journalistic team of Miro Quesada and Francisco Elias Barrientos, whose informative and commercial approach would make it one of the most viewed sites of Peru with their innovative dissemination of news on the Internet. Currently these functions are vested in John Taylor and Mark Paredes.

== Other stations ==
Radio Programas del Peru started acquiring and launching different radio networks with varied programming formats. RPP later merged their management into a new conglomerate, the RPP Group (Spanish: Grupo RPP)

- Studio 92
- MegaMix
- Radio Felicidad
- Radio Oxígeno
- Radio Corazón

== RPP TV ==
It started off as a programming block of lifestyle-oriented pay television channel Plus TV (from Movistar TV cable and satellite provider) in 2005. It was aired daily from 5:00 to 10:00 local time. On January 31, 2011, RPP TV was launched as an independent TV channel exclusively on Movistar TV. At first, it relayed programming from the RPP radio network, but it progressively started to produce its own specialised programs.

== Coverage ==
- Lima - 89.7 FM and 730 AM
- Trujillo - 90.9 FM
- Chimbote
- Cusco - 93.3 FM
- Chachapoyas - 92.1 FM
- Bagua
- Huari
- Abancay
- Arequipa - 102.3 FM
- Ayacucho - 100.9 FM
- Urubamba
- Huánuco
- Tingo María
- Ica
- Ilo
- Huancayo - 97.3 FM
- Moyobamba - 96.3 FM
- Moquegua
- La Merced
- Chiclayo - 96.7 FM
- Barranca - 1100 AM
- Huacho - 90.3 FM
- Cerro de Pasco
- Piura
- Sullana
- Juliaca
- Tarapoto - 103.1 FM
- Tacna - 89.5 FM
- Tumbes
- Pucallpa

== See also ==
- List of radio stations in Peru
- Media of Peru
