= La Tele (Peruvian TV network) =

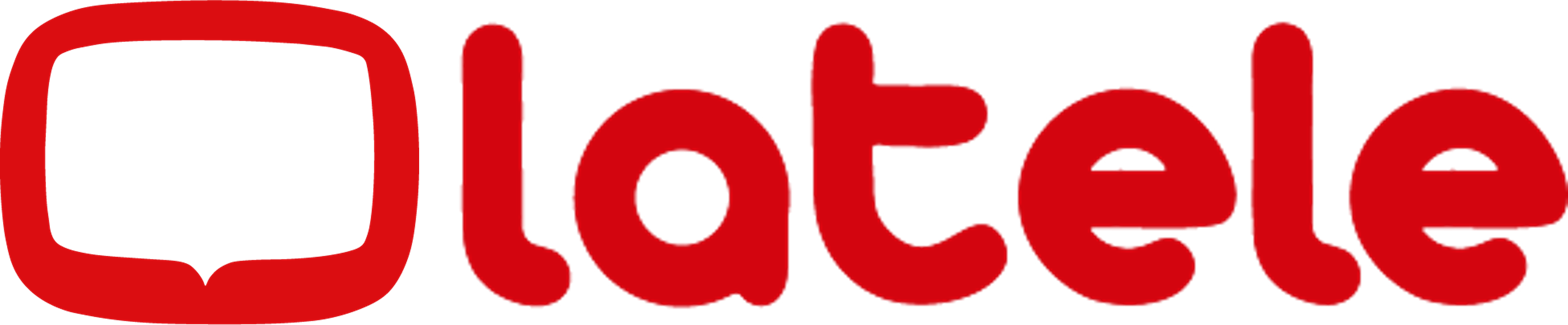
- Country: Peru
- Broadcast area: Nationwide
- Headquarters: Lima

Programming
- Language: Spanish
- Picture format: 480i SDTV

Ownership
- Owner: Grupo ATV

History
- Launched: January 7, 2009; 17 years ago
- Replaced: Uranio TV

Availability

Terrestrial
- Digital UHF: channel 23.1 (Lima, listings may vary)

La Tele is a minor television network operated by Grupo ATV, in turn owned by Albavisión, airing exclusively imported programming, similar in profile to other secondary channels of the network, like Repretel 4, Nicaragua's Canal 9 and Guatemala's Canal 11 and Canal 13. Its programming is focused on cartoons, youth and police series, comedies and reality shows.

== History ==
Alliance SAC won eight licenses in six provinces to spread the signal of Uranio 15, however, these licenses are currently used to rebroadcast the programming of Andina de Radiodifusión (ATV), channel 9 in Lima. With these licenses, Vera Abad managed to ATV's transmission network, using permits issued on behalf of Uranio 15.

Uranio 15 (established in 1994) was a channel that had some programs led by Oscar Gayoso, Pedro Sanchez, Chris, Roxana among other presenters. Its iconic program was El Ranking and of course a large selection of music videos of all genres, 24 hours a day. Uranio 15 was one of the biggest UHF channels of its time, then in 2007 it started broadcasting music videos without identification.

In early 2009, when Mexican businessman Remigio Ángel González took over the control of Grupo ATV through Albavisión Communications Group LLC, Uranio TV disappeared, replaced by La Tele. At launch, the channel focused on a female demographic, with telenovelas being transmitted on weekdays and films (some already transmitted by ATV and some premieres) on weekends. The telenovelas came from the catalogs of TV Globo (Celebridade, Belíssima and the miniseries A Casa das Sete Mulheres), TV Azteca (Mirada de mujer, Daniela and Soñarás), RCN, Telemundo y Caracol. The network was represented by Peruvian-born actress Shirley Budge and speculations for the production of a daily female magazine program began, which was set to premiere in April, during mornings. In addition to the main station in Lima, it was also made available on Cable Mágico channel 35 and Telmex TV channel 3, as well as obtaining several VHF relays: channel 13 in Piura, 7 in Chiclayo and 11 in Chimbote, as well as one on UHF, 19 in Trujillo. In late 2010, Albavisión, aware of the success of the channel in Peru, announced its plans to launch it in other countries, beginning with Ecuador and, later, in Guatemala and Nicaragua.

In January 2013, the channel relaunched with premieres of international series in the evening hours and some short programs aimed at women.

In April 2015, Global TV was replaced by Red TV and the entire children and youth programming moved to the channel. In November that year, the channel's logo color switched to yellow.

In April 2017, the channel added more telenovelas to its programming and continued the cartoon block in the morning, as well as the inclusion of more American films, series, comedies and reality shows. Disney's youth series and comedies were shared with its sister channel NexTV.

Since January 2018, the channel has increased the airtime of the children and youth block to 10 hours. The rest of the programming consists of American police series and some reality shows. In February that year, La Tele changed its aspect ratio from 4:3 to 16:9. Since June, it began broadcasting infomercials from the natural food companies Fitosana and Nutrsa Life in its programming. On July 4, it changed its graphic package with the launch of a new logo and look. In September, Disney's youth series and comedies returned to the channel after the name change from NexTV to América Next (today Global).

== Logos ==
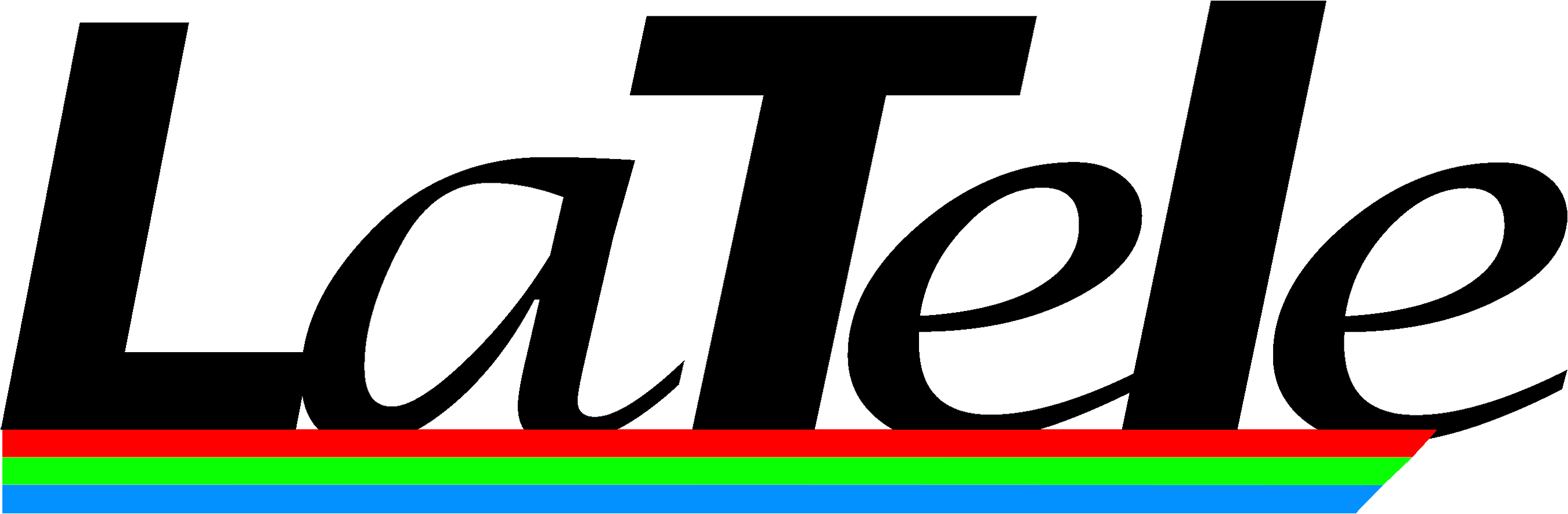
15.08.2008-7.01.2009

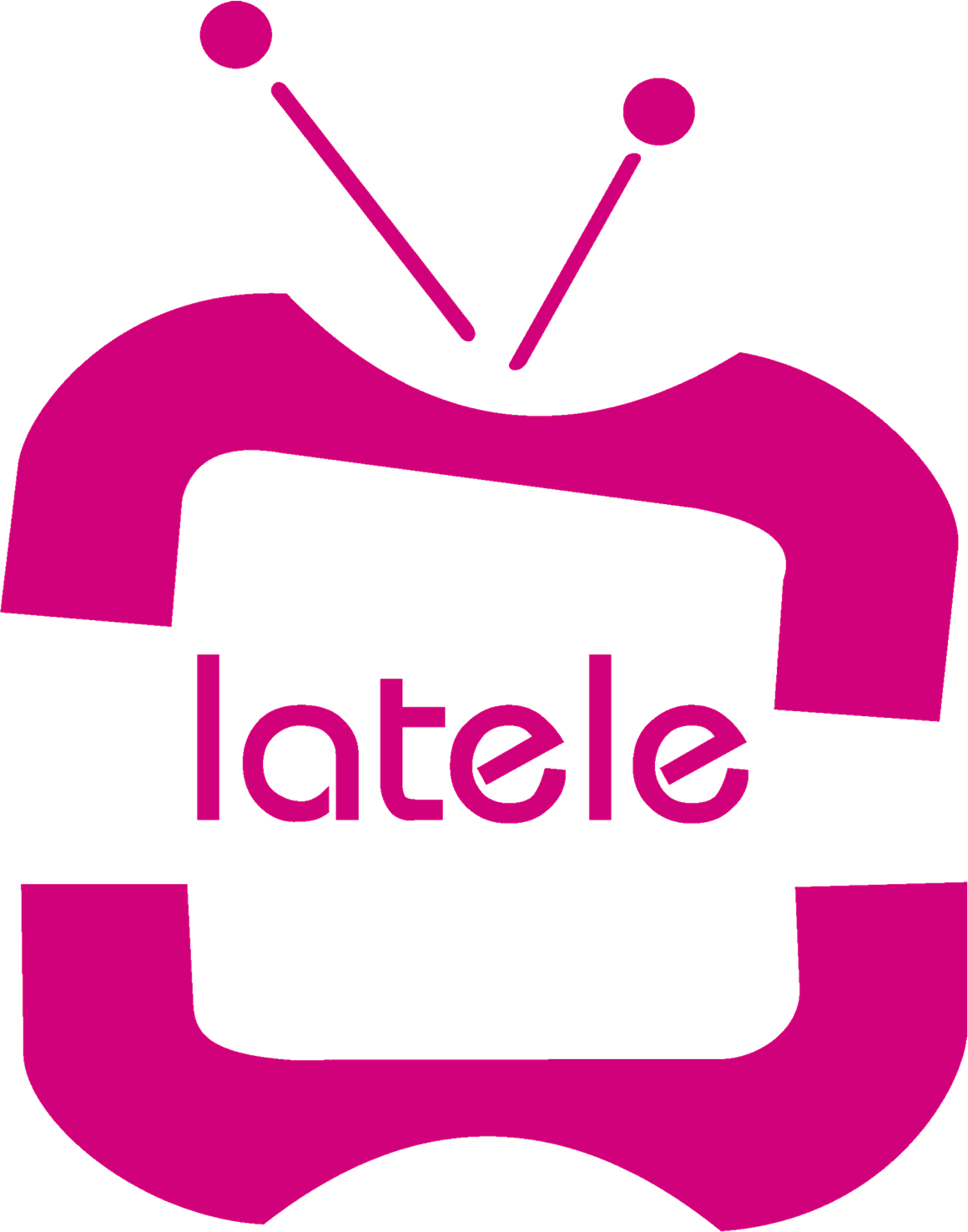
7.01.2009-1.11.2015

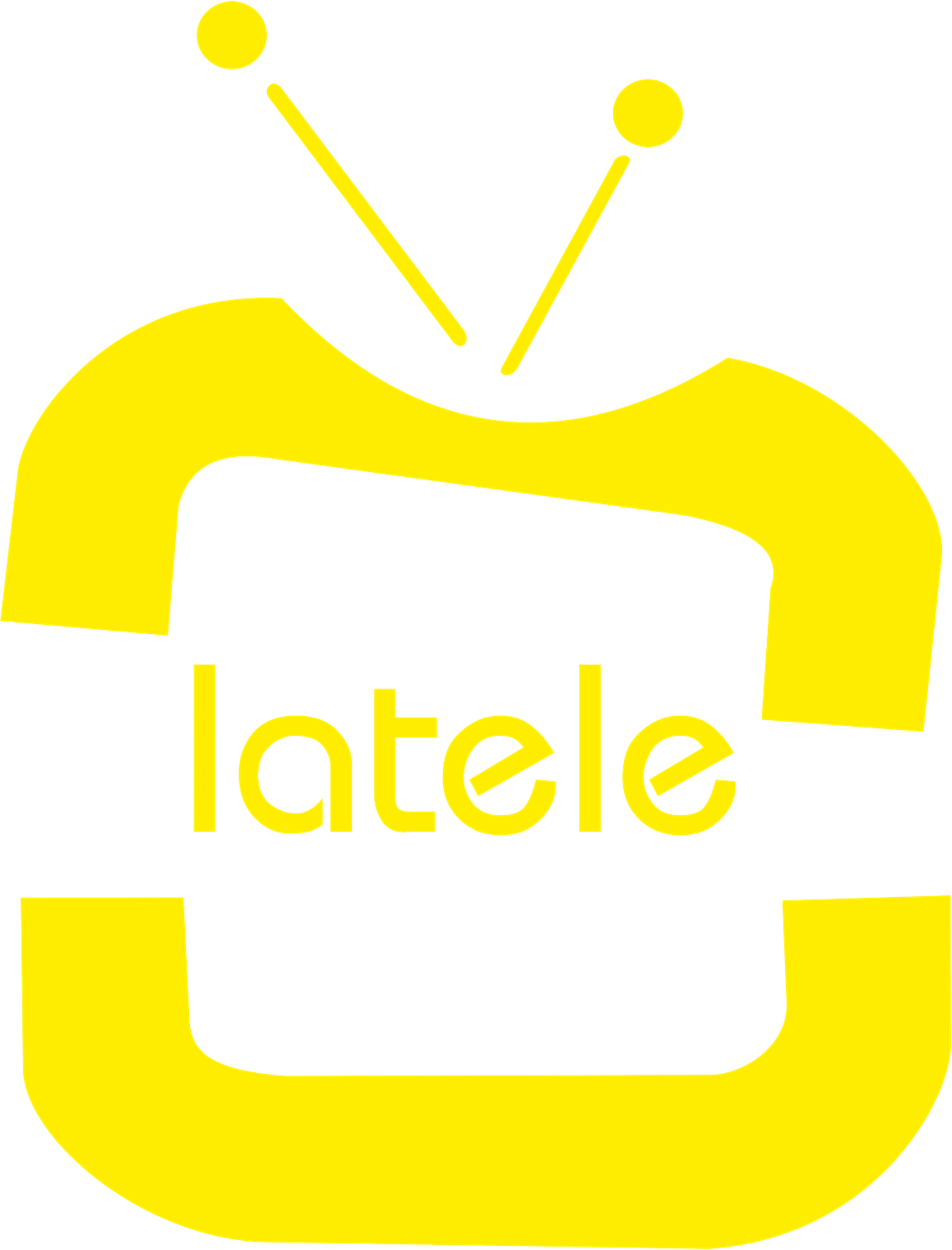
1.11.2015–4.07.2018

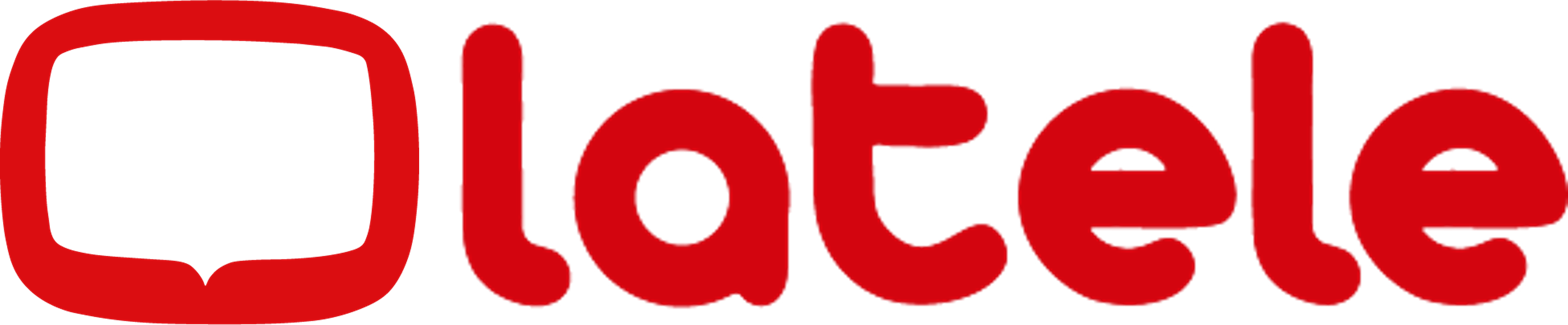
4.07.2018–present
