= Perú.21 =

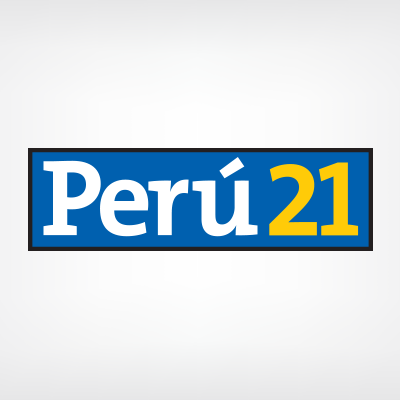
- Type: Daily newspaper
- Format: Broadsheet
- Owner: Cecilia Valenzuela
- Editor: Juan José Garrido
- Founded: 2002
- Language: Spanish
- Headquarters: Lima
- Price: 0.70 PEN
- Sister newspapers: Trome, El Comercio, Gestion, Depor, La Prensa
- Website: peru21.pe

Perú.21 is a Peruvian newspaper based in Lima.

== Background ==
In 2002, Perú.21 was founded by the economist Augusto Álvarez Rodrich, and it has quickly become one of the leading newspapers of Peru, known for its provocative caricatures and cartoon publications.

== Controversy ==
In 2012, the official website of Perú.21 was briefly blocked by the Government of Peru after it had published an article criticizing the government's budget management.

A few months later, a former journalist who had earlier worked for Perú.21 was arrested and imprisoned for hacking into the email accounts of government officials.

== See also ==
- List of newspapers in Peru
- Media of Peru
