= ATV Sur =

Peruvian television channel

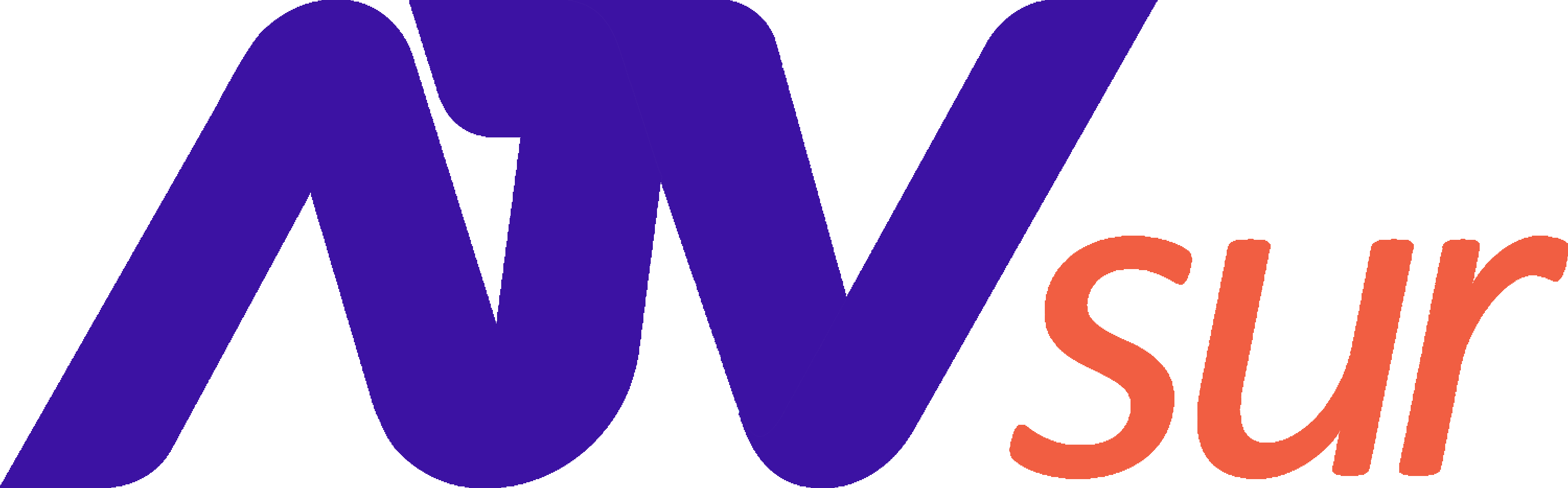
- Type: Television network
- Country: Peru
- Broadcast area: Peru

Programming
- Picture format: 1080i HDTV

Ownership
- Owner: Televisión Nacional Peruana S.A.C. (Grupo ATV/Albavisión)

History
- Launched: 1986 (as Canal 9); November 10, 2011; 14 years ago (current incarnation)
- Former names: Andina de Radiodifusión Televisión

Links
- Website: www.atv.pe

Availability

Terrestrial
- Analog VHF: Channel 9 (Arequipa, listings may vary)
- Digital VHF: Channel 9.1 (Arequipa, listings may vary)

ATV Sur is a Peruvian over-the-air television channel, owned by the Grupo ATV. It was launched in its current form on November 10, 2011, and broadcasts from Arequipa to the south of the country via over-the-air signals and as a national subscription television channel. It is the first television station outside of Lima to broadcast its signal via satellite.

== History ==
The idea of founding a television channel by Arequipa businessman Enrique Mendoza Núñez arose in 1984 with the creation of the Compañía de Radiodiversión Arequipa Sociedad Anónima (CRASA), which broadcast its first test signal in February 1986 on channel 8 of the VHF band. Having complied with the requirements of the Law, on August 8 of the same year, it began to officially broadcast under the name Canal 8 Arequipa, to compete with Canal 2 of Arequipa (subsidiary of Panamericana Televisión) and Televisión Continental (channel 6, subsidiary of América Televisión). It was the first subsidiary of Andina de Televisión in Arequipa until 1998. Therefore, its corporate image was inspired by that of channel 9 in Lima.

In 1994, Canal 8 expanded its coverage in other cities in the south of the country within the UHF band. On February 28, 1996, by a resolution of the Ministry of Transportation and Communications (MTC), the channel moved to channel 9 and changed its name to El Canal de Arequipa. In 1997, CRASA and Norperuana de Radiodimisiones ceased to be subsidiaries of Andina de Televisión, rented VHF frequency 11 in Lima (RBC Televisión) and formed Austral Televisión, a channel that began broadcasting in 1998. However, Austral was dissolved in 2002 due to internal problems.

Thus, in 2003, channel 9 of Arequipa became independent and two years later, on January 31, 2005, it was renamed Perú TV and became the first regional channel to broadcast via satellite. However, in 2007, the owning family clashed with the National Institute of Radio and Television of Peru over the rights to the trademark.

On October 18, 2011, the Mendoza-Del Solar family sold all of their shares in the channel to Grupo ATV for S/.7 million. Days after the purchase was completed, the relaunch of the channel as ATV Sur was announced and would focus its transmissions on the south of the country. When Grupo ATV acquired channel 9 (Perú TV), it ceased regional production on channel 5 (ATV) and moved the entire operations center of Grupo ATV to the Cayma location.

On November 10, 2011, the channel officially changed its name to ATV Sur, in a ceremony with the presence of directors such as Marcello Cúneo and main stars of Grupo ATV such as Magaly Medina and Pilar Higashi. For his part, Enrique Mendoza del Solar continued as general manager of the television station.

ATV Sur began broadcasting content previously seen by ATV and Global TV, while some programs that were broadcast by Perú TV continued to air, including TV Noticias, Nuevo Día Magazine, Línea de fuego, Fantabuloso, Mesa Round and Bienvenidos al sabor.

In 2012, the channel began to broadcast programming from other Albavisión outlets it had the rights to in Peru, such as American series, films and Colombian and Argentine telenovelas that, at the time, were also broadcast on its sister channel La Tele. As a result, the channel's original programming disappeared over time.3 Then, the ATV Group, through a judicial measure, entered into litigation with the Lima channel RBC Televisión to obtain control of Channel 11 of Lima.

In July 2013, Enrique Sifuentes Martínez assumed leadership of ATV Sur as General Manager. Subsequently, it would abandon its web portal to go to the Tuteve.tv portal (ATV Group's portal). Then, said channel stops broadcasting movies.

On June 26, 2014, ATV Sur launched its high definition signal on DTT exclusively for Lima and Callao, on virtual channel 23.1.

Since 2017, it began broadcasting some miscellaneous programs simultaneously with the ATV+ channel. Starting that year, ATV Sur increased the broadcast hours of American series in its programming. On the other hand, it did not stop transmitting via streaming.

In 2018, ATV Sur began its DTT broadcasts in the cities of Zone 2, after the ATV Group subchannels in those areas were separated into 2 multiplex signals.
