= Movistar TV =

Paid TV in operated by Telefónica

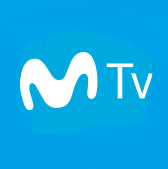

Movistar TV is a subscription television service operated by Telefónica. Currently, the service is available in Chile, Peru, Colombia, El Salvador, Venezuela and Argentina. In Spain, this service merged with the satellite platform Canal+, resulting in a new platform called Movistar+.

== History ==
The service was started as a commercial test pilot in the city of Alicante in 2001 and later extended to some major cities such as Madrid and Barcelona in April 2004. In 2013, Movistar Imagenio was rebranded to Movistar TV.

As of March 2006, coverage has yet reached the whole of Spain. Major cities and province capitals are covered, but not rural areas or minor cities. It is possible for users to check on-line if the service is available for their phone line on the Movistar website.

The channel line-up includes some international English-language channels, such as CNN International and BBC World News. Additionally for certain channels, Movistar TV allows the viewer to switch instantly from the dubbed Spanish versions of foreign-made programs to the original-language version. This facility is available for many digital channels such as TCM, Calle 13, FOX and Disney Channel but not for national terrestrial/digital channels such as TVE, Antena3 or Telecinco.

== Technology ==
The Movistar TV (then called Imagenio) platform is powered by Alcatel-Lucent (formerly Lucent Technologies) since 2006. Previously, Imagenio platform was an in-house development held by Telefónica I+D (the R&D branch of Telefónica). In 2006, César Alierta (CEO of Telefónica) signed an agreement with Patricia Russo (CEO of Lucent Technologies at that time) for the Imagenio base-technology transfer.

Since November 2007, Imagenio incorporated new features that allow the customer to have a truly TV 'a la carte': the services "Past TV," "Shift TV," "Rewind TV" and "Recorder Staff. " These services are made possible by a HD TV (High Definition Television) decoder with a hard drive of 160 GB, similar to TiVo.

"Past TV" is an exclusive service of Movistar TV, which makes it possible to access content broadcast up to seven days before, has been officially recorded by Imagenio without the client having to do anything. "Shift TV" is an option that allows users to stop live broadcast of any program from any channel, and then continue viewing. The service "Rewind TV," allows instant repeat of last minute broadcast of the channel, for example, to be able to follow since the beginning.

== See also ==
- Claro TV
