= Outline of Peru =

Country in South America

The Flag of Peru

The Coat of arms of Peru

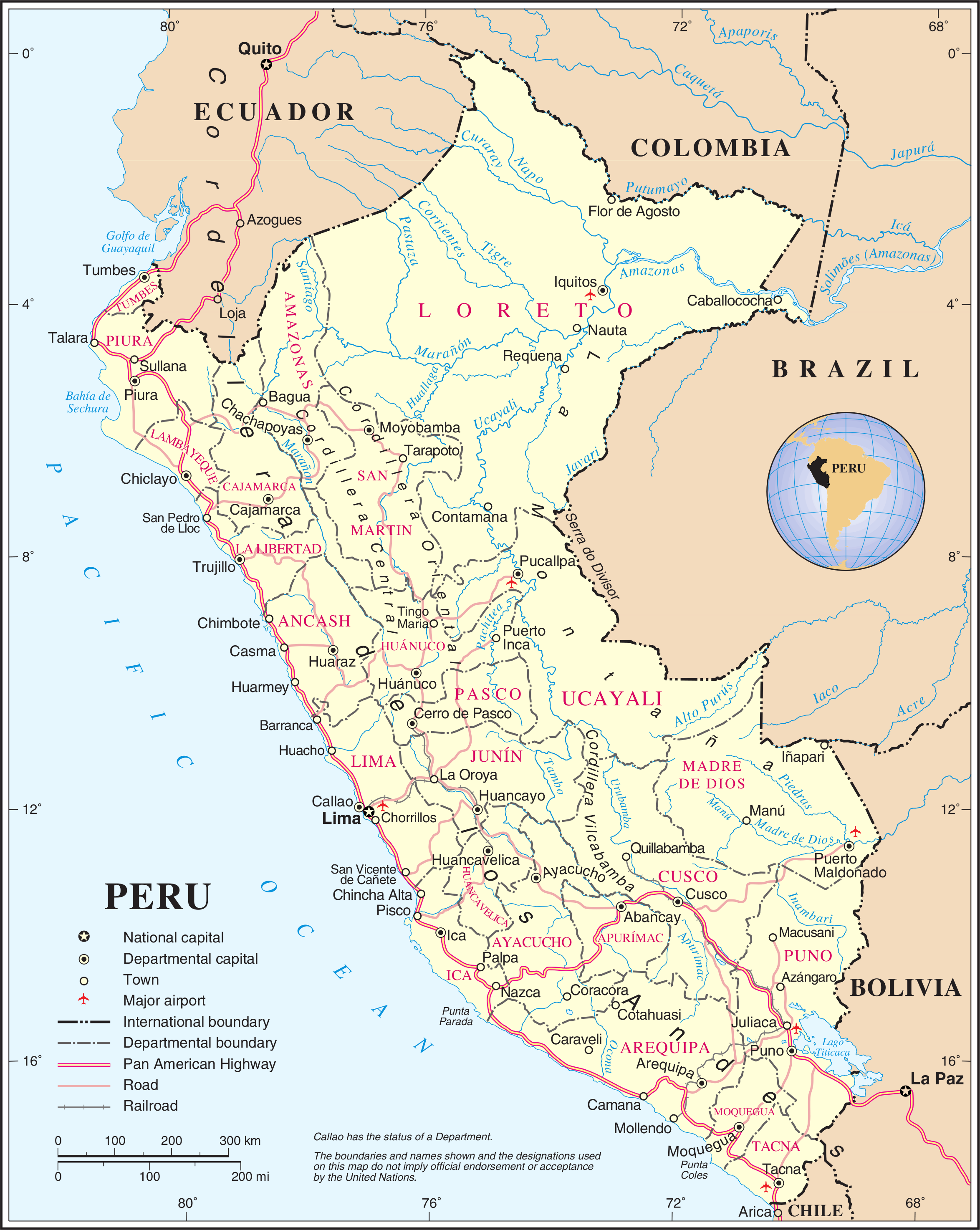
An enlargeable map of Peru

The following outline is provided as an overview of and topical guide to Peru:

Peru – country located in western South America, on the Pacific Coast, north of Chile. Peruvian territory was home to several ancient cultures. Ranging from the Norte Chico civilization in the 32nd century BC, the oldest civilization in the Americas and one of the five cradles of civilization, to the Inca Empire, the largest state in pre-Columbian America, the territory now including Peru has one of the longest histories of civilization of any country, tracing its heritage back to the 4th millennia BCE. The Spanish Empire conquered the region in the 16th century and established a Viceroyalty, which included most of its South American colonies. After achieving independence in 1821, Peru has undergone periods of political unrest and fiscal crisis as well as periods of stability and economic upswing.

== General reference ==
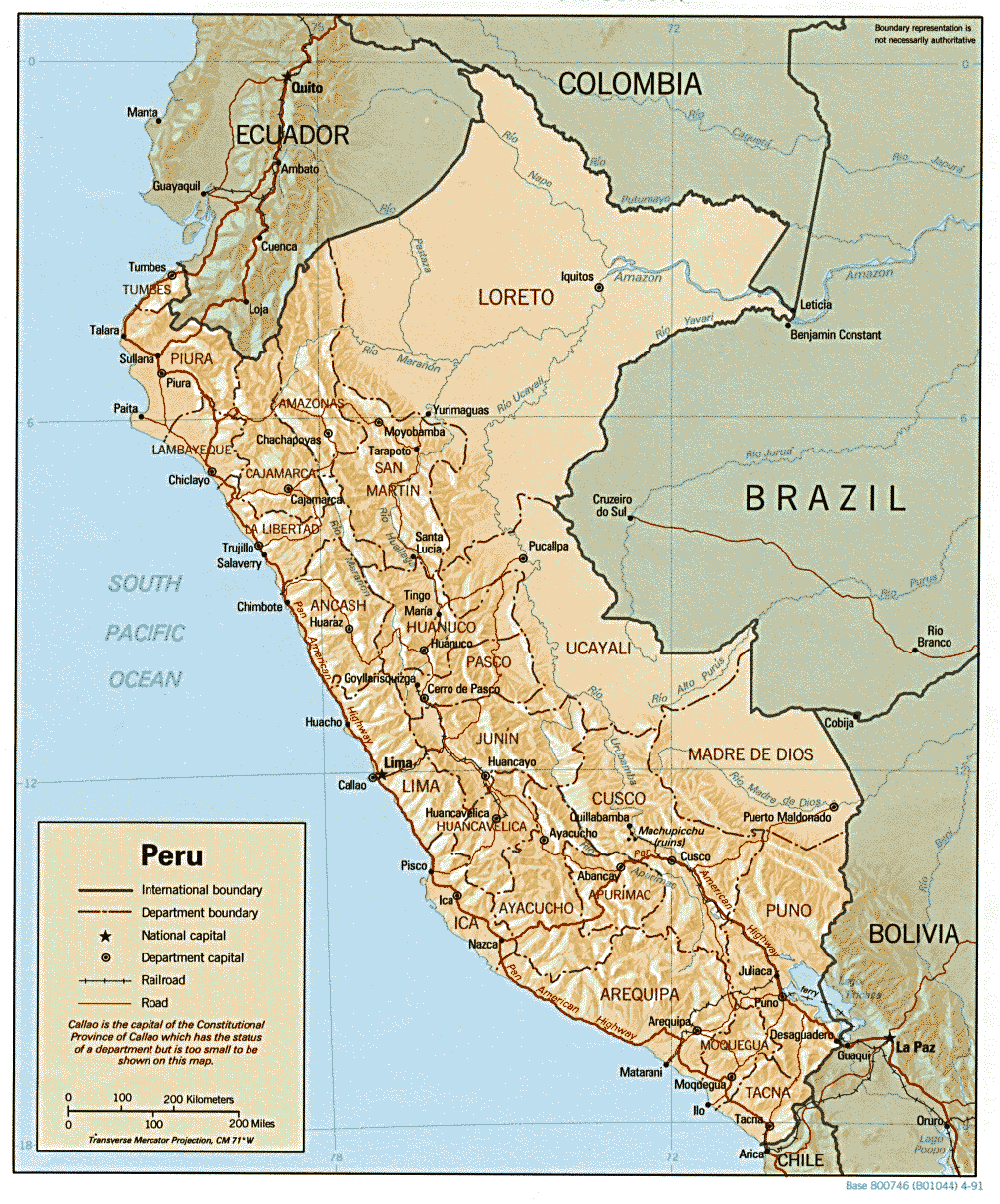
An enlargeable relief map of Peru

- Pronunciation: /pəˈruː/
- Common English country name: Peru
- Official English country name: The Republic of Peru
- Common endonym(s): Perú, Piruw
- Official endonym(s): República del Perú, Piruw Hapan llaqta, Piruw Suyu
- Adjectival(s): Peruvian
- Demonym(s): Peruvians
- Etymology: Name of Peru
- International rankings of Peru
- ISO country codes: PE, PER, 604
- ISO region codes: See ISO 3166-2:PE
- Internet country code top-level domain: .pe

== Geography of Peru ==
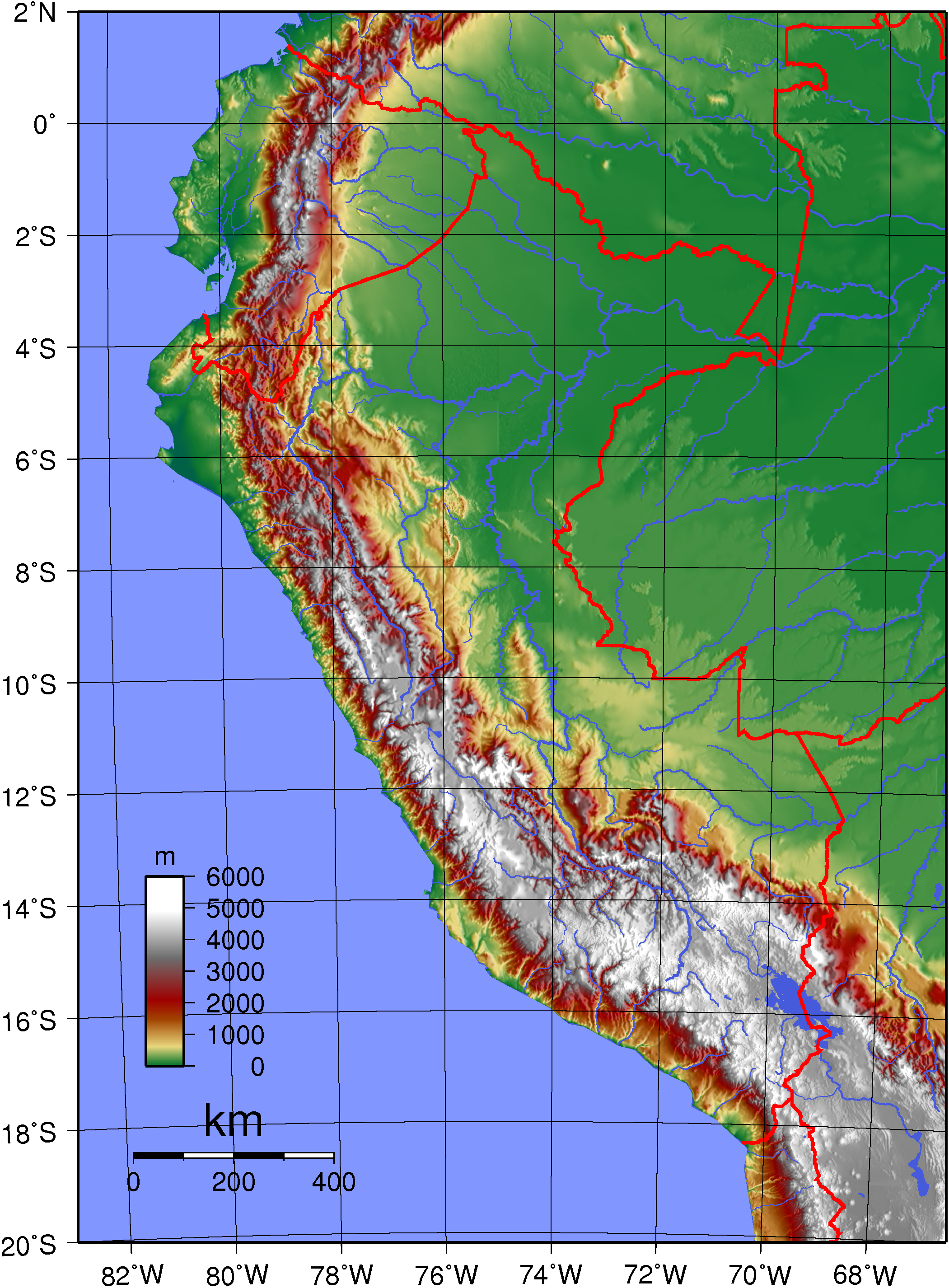
An enlargeable topographic map of Peru

Geography of Peru

- Peru is: a megadiverse country
- Location:
  - Southern Hemisphere
  - Western Hemisphere
    - Americas
      - Latin America
        - South America
  - Time in Peru
    - Time zone: UTC-05
  - Extreme points of Peru
    - High: Huascarán 6,768 m (22,205 ft) – highest point in the Tropics
    - Low: South Pacific Ocean 0 m
  - Land boundaries: 7,461 km

Brazil 2,995 km
Colombia 1,800 km
Ecuador 1,420 km
Bolivia 1,075 km
Chile 171 km

- Coastline: South Pacific Ocean 2,414 km

- Population of Peru: 28,750,770 (June 30, 2007) - 44th most populous country
- Area of Peru: 1,285,220 km^{2} (496,230 sq mi) - 19th largest country
- Atlas of Peru

=== Environment of Peru ===
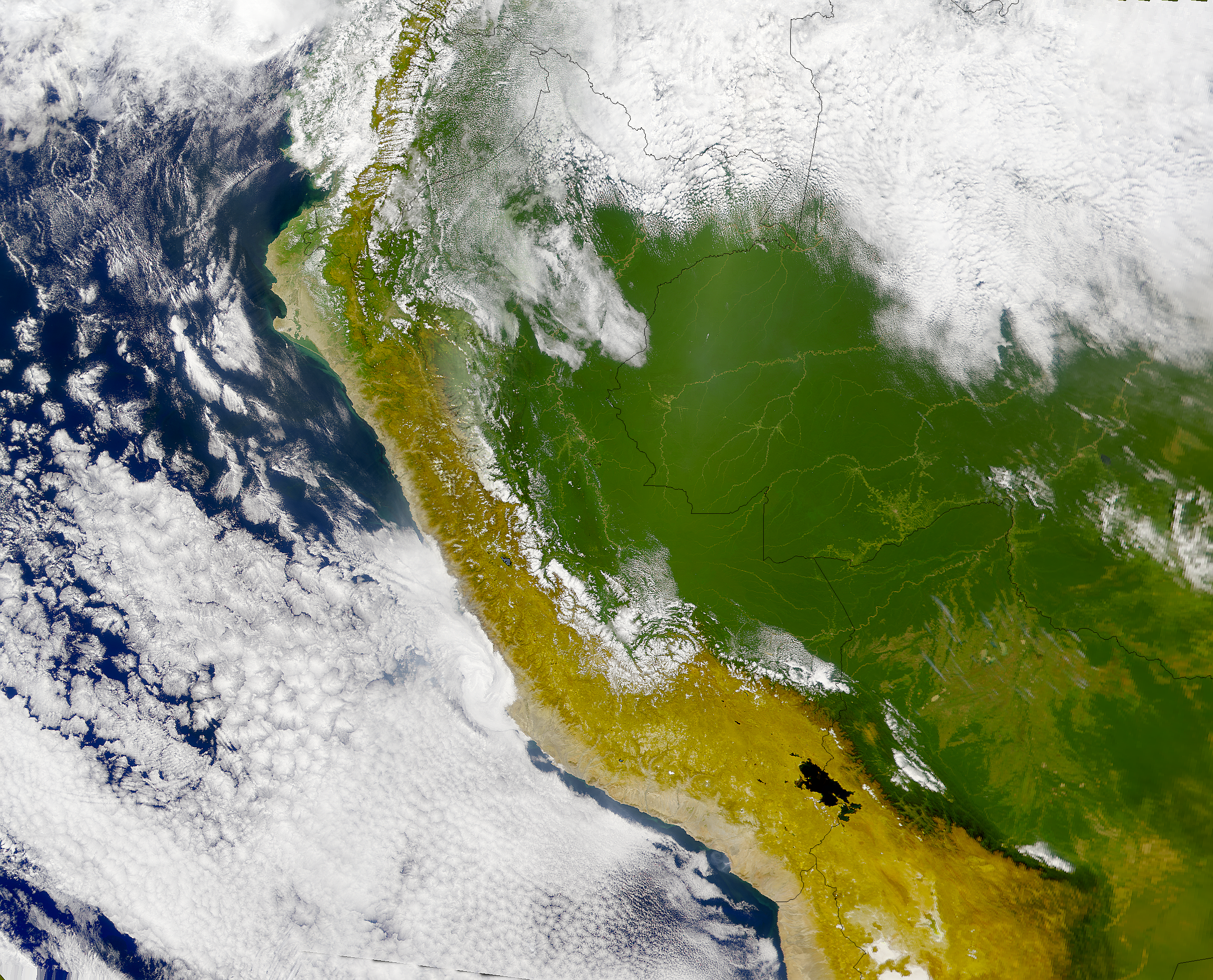
An enlargeable satellite image of Peru

- Climate of Peru
- Environmental issues in Peru
- Renewable energy in Peru
- Geology of Peru
  - List of earthquakes in Peru
- Natural regions of Peru
- Protected areas of Peru
  - Biosphere reserves in Peru
  - National parks of Peru
- Wildlife of Peru
  - Flora of Peru
  - Fauna of Peru
    - Birds of Peru
    - Mammals of Peru

==== Natural geographic features of Peru ====
- Fjords of Peru
- Glaciers of Peru
- Islands of Peru
- Lakes of Peru
- Mountains of Peru
  - Volcanoes in Peru
- Peru–Chile Trench
- Rivers of Peru
  - Waterfalls of Peru
- Valleys of Peru
- World Heritage Sites in Peru

=== Regions of Peru ===
==== Administrative divisions of Peru ====
Administrative divisions of Peru

- Regions of Peru
  - Provinces of Peru
    - Districts of Peru
      - Populated centres of Peru
  - Former regions of Peru
- Municipalities of Peru

===== Regions of Peru =====
Regions of Peru Peru is divided into 25 regions and the province of Lima.

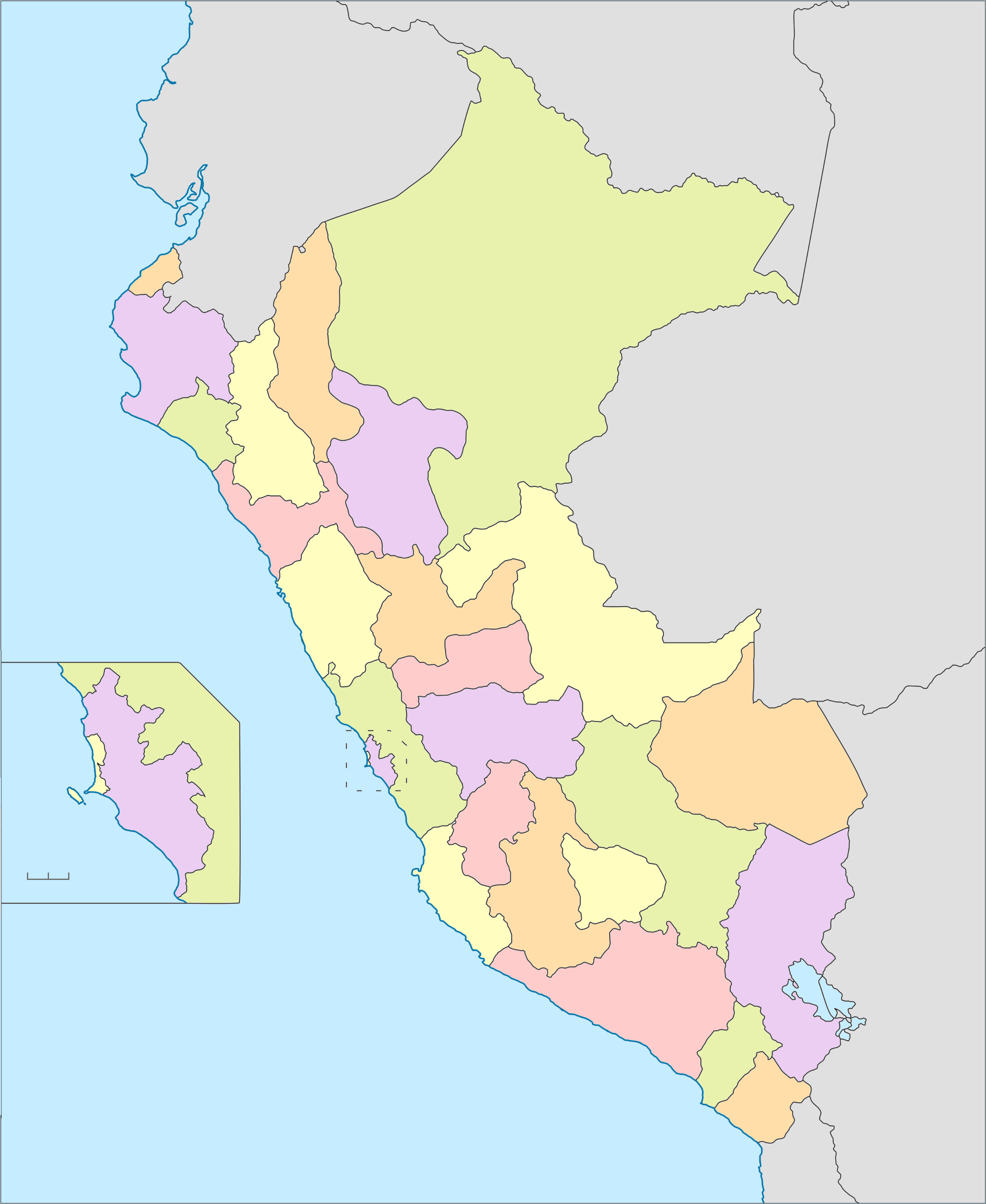
Clickable map of the regions of Peru.

- Amazonas
- Ancash
- Apurímac
- Arequipa
- Ayacucho
- Cajamarca
- Callao
- Cusco
- Huancavelica
- Huánuco
- Ica
- Junín
- La Libertad
- Lambayeque
- Lima
- Loreto
- Madre de Dios
- Moquegua
- Pasco
- Piura
- Puno
- San Martín
- Tacna
- Tumbes
- Ucayali
- Lima Province

===== Provinces of Peru =====
Provinces of Peru

===== Districts of Peru =====
Districts of Peru

===== Municipalities of Peru =====
Municipalities of Peru

- Capital of Peru: Lima
- Cities of Peru

=== Demography of Peru ===
Demographics of Peru

- Census in Peru

=== Neighbours of Peru ===
Peru is bordered by:

- Bolivia
- Brazil
- Chile
- Colombia
- Ecuador

== Government and politics of Peru ==
- Politics of Peru
  - Form of government: unitary semi-presidential representative democratic republic
  - Capital of Peru: Lima
  - Census in Peru
  - Communism in Peru
  - Decentralization process in Peru
  - Elections in Peru
    - Peruvian electoral system
      - Voting in Peru is compulsory (until the age of 70)
    - Peruvian presidential elections: 1895 - 1899 - 2000 - 2001 - 2006 - 2011
    - Peruvian parliamentary elections: 1978 - 1992 - 2000 - 2001 - 2006 - 2011
  - Liberalism in Peru
  - Political parties in Peru
  - Taxation in Peru

=== Branches of the government of Peru ===
- Government of Peru

==== Executive branch of the government of Peru ====
- Head of state and head of government: President of Peru, Keiko Fujimori
  - Vice Presidents of Peru: First Vice President of Peru, Luis Galarreta and Second Vice President of Peru, Miki Torres
- Cabinet: Council of Ministers of Peru
- Ministries of Peru
  - Prime Minister of Peru, Luis Galarreta
  - Ministry of Agriculture
  - Ministry of Culture
  - Ministry of Defence
  - Ministry of Economy and Finance
  - Ministry of Education
  - Ministry of Energy and Mines
  - Ministry of Environment
  - Ministry of Foreign Affairs
  - Ministry of Foreign Trade and Tourism
  - Ministry of Health
  - Ministry of Housing, Construction and Sanitation
  - Ministry of the Interior
  - Ministry of Justice
  - Ministry of Labour and Promotion of Employment
  - Ministry of Production
  - Ministry of Transport and Communications
  - Ministry of Women and Vulnerable Populations

==== Legislative branch of the government of Peru ====
- Parliament of Peru: Congress of the Republic (unicameral)
  - Members of Congress

==== Judicial branch of the government of Peru ====
- Judicial system of Peru
  - Constitutional Court of Peru - interprets the constitution on matters of individual rights
  - Supreme Court of Peru - located in the Palace of Justice
    - Superior Courts of Justice of Peru preside over the Judicial Districts of Peru
      - Courts of First Instance of Peru hold jurisdiction over each province
        - Courts of Peace of Peru each have jurisdiction over a single district

=== Foreign relations of Peru ===
- Foreign relations of Peru
  - Diplomatic missions in Peru
  - Diplomatic missions of Peru
  - Chile–Peru relations

==== International organization membership ====
The Republic of Peru is a member of:

- Agency for the Prohibition of Nuclear Weapons in Latin America and the Caribbean (OPANAL)
- Andean Community of Nations (CAN)
- Asia-Pacific Economic Cooperation (APEC)
- Food and Agriculture Organization (FAO)
- Group of 15 (G15)
- Group of 24 (G24)
- Group of 77 (G77)
- Inter-American Development Bank (IADB)
- International Atomic Energy Agency (IAEA)
- International Bank for Reconstruction and Development (IBRD)
- International Civil Aviation Organization (ICAO)
- International Criminal Court (ICCt)
- International Criminal Police Organization (Interpol)
- International Development Association (IDA)
- International Federation of Red Cross and Red Crescent Societies (IFRCS)
- International Finance Corporation (IFC)
- International Fund for Agricultural Development (IFAD)
- International Hydrographic Organization (IHO)
- International Labour Organization (ILO)
- International Maritime Organization (IMO)
- International Mobile Satellite Organization (IMSO)
- International Monetary Fund (IMF)
- International Olympic Committee (IOC)
- International Organization for Migration (IOM)
- International Organization for Standardization (ISO)
- International Red Cross and Red Crescent Movement (ICRM)
- International Telecommunication Union (ITU)
- International Telecommunications Satellite Organization (ITSO)
- International Trade Union Confederation (ITUC)
- Inter-Parliamentary Union (IPU)
- Latin American Economic System (LAES)
- Latin American Integration Association (LAIA)
- Multilateral Investment Guarantee Agency (MIGA)
- Nonaligned Movement (NAM)
- Organisation for the Prohibition of Chemical Weapons (OPCW)
- Organization of American States (OAS)
- Permanent Court of Arbitration (PCA)
- Rio Group (RG)
- Southern Cone Common Market (Mercosur) (associate)
- Unión Latina
- Union of South American Nations (UNASUR)
- United Nations (UN)
- United Nations Conference on Trade and Development (UNCTAD)
- United Nations Educational, Scientific, and Cultural Organization (UNESCO)
- United Nations Industrial Development Organization (UNIDO)
- United Nations Mission in Liberia (UNMIL)
- United Nations Mission in the Sudan (UNMIS)
- United Nations Operation in Cote d'Ivoire (UNOCI)
- United Nations Organization Mission in the Democratic Republic of the Congo (MONUC)
- United Nations Stabilization Mission in Haiti (MINUSTAH)
- Universal Postal Union (UPU)
- World Confederation of Labour (WCL)
- World Customs Organization (WCO)
- World Federation of Trade Unions (WFTU)
- World Health Organization (WHO)
- World Intellectual Property Organization (WIPO)
- World Meteorological Organization (WMO)
- World Tourism Organization (UNWTO)
- World Trade Organization (WTO)

=== Law and order in Peru ===
- Capital punishment in Peru
- Constitution of Peru
- Crime in Peru
  - Domestic violence in Peru
- Human rights in Peru
  - Abortion in Peru
  - LGBT rights in Peru
  - Freedom of religion in Peru
- Law enforcement in Peru
  - National Police of Peru
- Nationality law of Peru

=== Military of Peru ===
- Military of Peru
  - Command
    - Commander-in-chief:
      - Ministry of Defence
        - Joint Command of the Armed Forces of Peru
  - Forces
    - Army of Peru
    - Navy of Peru
    - Air Force of Peru
    - Special forces of Peru
  - Military history of Peru
  - Military ranks of Peru

=== Local government in Peru ===
- Regional Governments of Peru

== History of Peru ==
=== By period ===
- Ancient civilizations of Peru
  - Cultural periods of Peru
- Inca Empire
  - Spanish conquest of Peru
  - Neo-Inca State
- Viceroyalty of Peru
- Peruvian War of Independence
- Guano era in Peru
- War of the Pacific
- Colombia-Peru War
- Ecuadorian–Peruvian War
- Internal conflict in Peru
- Peruvian political crisis

=== By subject ===
- Agricultural history of Peru
- Demographic history of Peru
- Economic history of Peru
- Homosexuality in ancient Peru
- Military history of Peru

=== By type of event ===
- Massacres in Peru

== Culture of Peru ==
Culture of Peru

- Architecture of Peru
  - Inca architecture
  - Peruvian colonial architecture
  - Peruvian Viceroyal architecture
- Cuisine of Peru
- Festivals in Peru
- Languages of Peru
- Media in Peru
- Metrication in Peru
- National symbols of Peru
  - Coat of arms of Peru
  - Flag of Peru
  - National anthem of Peru
  - Cockade of Peru (unofficial national symbol)
- People of Peru
  - Indigenous peoples in Peru
- Prostitution in Peru
- Public holidays in Peru
- Records of Peru
- Scouting and Guiding in Peru
- Television in Peru
- World Heritage Sites in Peru

=== Art in Peru ===
- Art in Peru
- Cinema of Peru
- Literature of Peru
- Music of Peru
- Television in Peru
- Theatre in Peru

=== Religion in Peru ===
Religion in Peru

- Christianity in Peru
  - Roman Catholicism in Peru
    - Roman Catholic dioceses in Peru
- Hinduism in Peru
- Islam in Peru
- Judaism in Peru
- Sikhism in Peru

=== Sports in Peru ===
Sports in Peru

- Football in Peru
  - Chile and Peru football rivalry
  - Football clubs in Peru
  - Football stadiums in Peru
  - Peru national football team
- Peru at the Olympics
- Tennis in Peru
  - Peru Davis Cup team
- Rugby union in Peru
- Surfing in Peru

== Economy and infrastructure of Peru ==
Economy of Peru

- Economic rank, by nominal GDP (2007): 54th (fifty-fourth)
- Agriculture in Peru
- Banking in Peru
  - National Bank of Peru
  - Central Reserve Bank of Peru
- Communications in Peru
  - Internet in Peru
  - Media in Peru
    - Newspapers in Peru
  - List of postal codes in Peru
  - Telephone numbers in Peru
- Companies of Peru
- Currency of Peru: Sol
  - ISO 4217: PEN
- Economic history of Peru
- Energy in Peru
  - Electric power in Peru
  - Energy policy of Peru
  - Oil industry in Peru
- Fishing in Peru
- Health care in Peru
  - HIV/AIDS in Peru
  - Hospitals in Peru
- Mining in Peru
- Peru Stock Exchange
- Tourism in Peru
- Transport in Peru
  - Airports in Peru
  - Rail transport in Peru
  - Roads in Peru
    - Highways in Peru
- Water resources management in Peru
  - Irrigation in Peru
  - Water supply and sanitation in Peru

== Education in Peru ==
Education in Peru

== See also ==
Peru

- Iperu, tourist information and assistance
- List of international rankings
- List of Peru-related topics
- Member state of the United Nations
- Outline of geography
- Outline of South America
