= Law of Peru =

The law of Peru includes a constitution and legislation. The law of Perú is part of the Roman-Germanic tradition, which accords the utmost importance to written law; therefore, statutes known as leyes are the primary source of law.

== Constitution ==
The present constitution is that of 31 December 1993.

== Legislation ==
The legislature is Congreso de la República del Perú. The gazette is called El Peruano, Diario Oficial. Legislation includes instruments called laws (Spanish: ley) and decrees (Spanish: decreto)

=== List of legislation ===
No longer in force:

- Penal Code of 1836
- Penal Code of 28 July 1924
- Civil Code of 1936
- Civil Procedure Code of 1912
- Constitution of 1978
- Commerce Code of 1902 (Only partially in force).

Currently in force:

- Civil Code of 1984 (Código Civil)
- Code of Criminal Procedure of 1940 (Only for Lima)
- Penal Code of 8 April 1991 (Legislative Decree No 635)
- Decree Law 25418 of April 1992
- Legislative Decree No 822 of 23 April 1996
- Code of Criminal Procedure of 22 July 2004 (Legislative Decree No 957)
- General Law of Administrative Proceedings (Ley del Procedimiento Administrativo General No. 27444).
- Law of Smuggling (Mainly for Smuggling of objects and never human smuggling) in Spanish as Ley de los delitos aduaneros No Ley 28008

== Courts and judiciary ==
There is a Supreme Court, and there are Superior Courts, Courts of First Instance and Courts of Peace. There was formerly a Real Audiencia of Lima.

== Legal practitioners ==
There is a College of Advocates of Lima (Spanish: Colegio de Abogados de Lima). since 1811. The college has been equated with a bar association. Legislation relevant to advocates has included decrees of 6 April 1837, 31 March 1838, 27 April 1848, and laws of 8 January 1848 and 21 October 1851.

== Criminal law ==
There is a Penal Code (Spanish: Código Penal). The Penal Code of 1836 was the country's first. The Penal Code of 28 July 1924 was replaced by the Penal Code of 8 April 1991 (Legislative Decree No 635).

The Code of Criminal Procedure of 1940 was partially superseded by the Code of Criminal Procedure of 22 July 2004 (Legislative Decree 957)

== Mining ==
According to Guillaume, the mining laws of Peru were reformed by a new law passed by Congress in January 1877, which substantially revised the old laws, establishing a new basis for mining property and introducing other important reforms to protect the industry. The mining laws of various nations were studied, and the new laws were, in part, based upon the law then in force in Spain.

== Copyright ==
As to copyright, see Legislative Decree No 822 of 23 April 1996.

== Tax ==
Taxes of the central government, such as Income Tax and Sales Tax, are collected by the National Administration, SUNAT (Superintendencia Nacional de Administración Tributaria).

== Other history ==
See the New Laws of 1542.

== See also ==
- Peruvian nationality law
