= Judicial District of Lima =

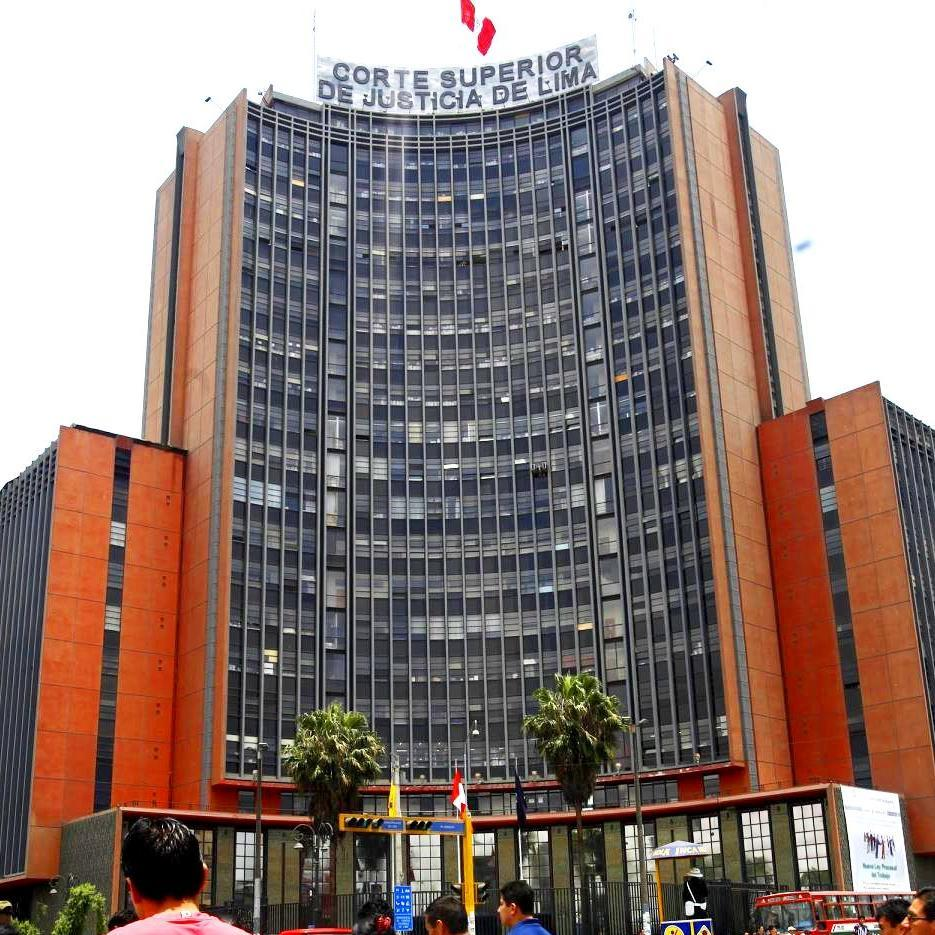

The Judicial District of Lima is one of the 28 Judicial Districts of the Judicial System of Peru.

Its main seat is in the city of Lima and its jurisdiction extends to 35 of the 43 Districts of Lima. The remaining eight districts (Independencia, San Martín de Porres, Comas, Los Olivos, Puente Piedra, Ancón, Santa Rosa, and Carabayllo) are under jurisdiction of the Judicial District of Cono Norte. Its jurisdiction not only covers part of the Lima Province but also the Huarochirí Province in the Lima Region.

It was created by the decree of August 4, 1824 and was established December 22, 1824 under the presidency of Simón Bolívar. It is the Judicial District with the most operations in the whole nation.

== Courts ==
- 33 Superior Courts of Justice
  - 8 Civil law courts
  - 2 Family law courts
  - 1 Commercial law courts
  - 6 Labor law courts
  - 16 Criminal law courts
- 229 Courts of First Instance
  - 89 Civil law courts
  - 21 Family law courts
  - 6 Commercial law courts
  - 29 Labor law courts
  - 69 Criminal law courts
  - 15 Mixed Courts
- 153 Courts of Peace

== See also ==
- Judicial System of Peru
