= Judicial District of Cono Norte =

The Judicial District of Cono Norte is one of the 28 Judicial Districts of the Judicial System of Peru.

Its main seat is in the district of Independencia in Lima and its jurisdiction extends over the Limean districts of Independencia, San Martín de Porres, Comas, Los Olivos, Puente Piedra, Ancon, Santa Rosa, and Carabayllo which make up a section of the Lima Metropolitan Area called the Cono Norte. Also included under the jurisdiction of this Judicial District is the Canta Province of the Lima Region.

It was created by the Law Nº 25680 and was established on May 26, 1993 under the presidency of Alberto Fujimori.

== Courts ==
- 6 Superior Courts of Justice
  - 2 Civil law courts
  - 4 Criminal law courts
- 41 Courts of First Instance
  - 7 Civil law courts
  - 7 Family law courts
  - 1 Labor law courts
  - 19 Criminal law courts
  - 7 Mixed Courts
  - 24 Courts of Peace

== See also ==
- Judicial System of Peru
