= National symbols of Peru =

Peruvian national symbols representing unique culture

National symbols of Peru are the symbols that are used in Peru to represent what is unique about the nation, reflecting different aspects of the cultural life and history. The national symbols of Peru are established by law and part of the Political Constitution of Peru (Article 49).

== Official symbols ==
The official symbols of Peru are established by law and part of the Political Constitution of Peru (Article 49).

	Symbol	Image	Adopted
Flag	Flag of Peru	National Flag	February 25, 1825
National anthem	National Anthem of Peru	Somos libres, seámoslo siempre	September 19, 1821
Coat of arms	Coat of arms of Peru	Coat of Arms of Peru	March 18, 2016

== National emblems ==
	Symbol	Image	Adopted
Cockade	Cockade of Peru Escarapela	Cockade	1825
Motto	National motto: Firm and Happy for the Union		1825

== Unofficial symbols ==
	Symbol	Image	Remarks
National flower	Cantua (kantuta or guano) Cantua buxifolia	Cantuta buxifolia	Unofficial national flower emblems
National animal	Vicuña Vicugna vicugna	Vicugna vicugna	Unofficial national animal emblems
National bird	Cock-of-the-rock Rupicola peruviana	Rupicola peruviana	Unofficial national bird emblems
National colors		Red White	Unofficial national symbol
National Instrument	Pan-flute		Unofficial national symbol.

== Peruvian icons ==
Icons of Peruvian culture.

	Image	Remarks
Machu Picchu	Machu Picchu	Inca ruins of Machu Picchu.
Inca Kola	Machu Picchu	Sweet yellow soft drink.
Incan Empire		Ancient civilization that encompassed Peru.

== See also ==
- List of national animals
- List of national anthems
- List of national birds
- List of national flowers
