= Cockade of Spain =

National symbol

The Cockade of Spain is a national symbol that arose after the French Revolution, by pleating a golden pin over the former red ribbon, colors of the ancient Royal Bend of Castile. The resulting insignia is a circle that symbolizes the colors of the Spanish flag: Red and Yellow, being carried as individual representation in case of distinctions or prizes or by other types of events. At the moment it is not used in Spain, except as a roundel for the identification of Spanish Armed Forces aircraft.

== Gallery ==
Cockade of Spain

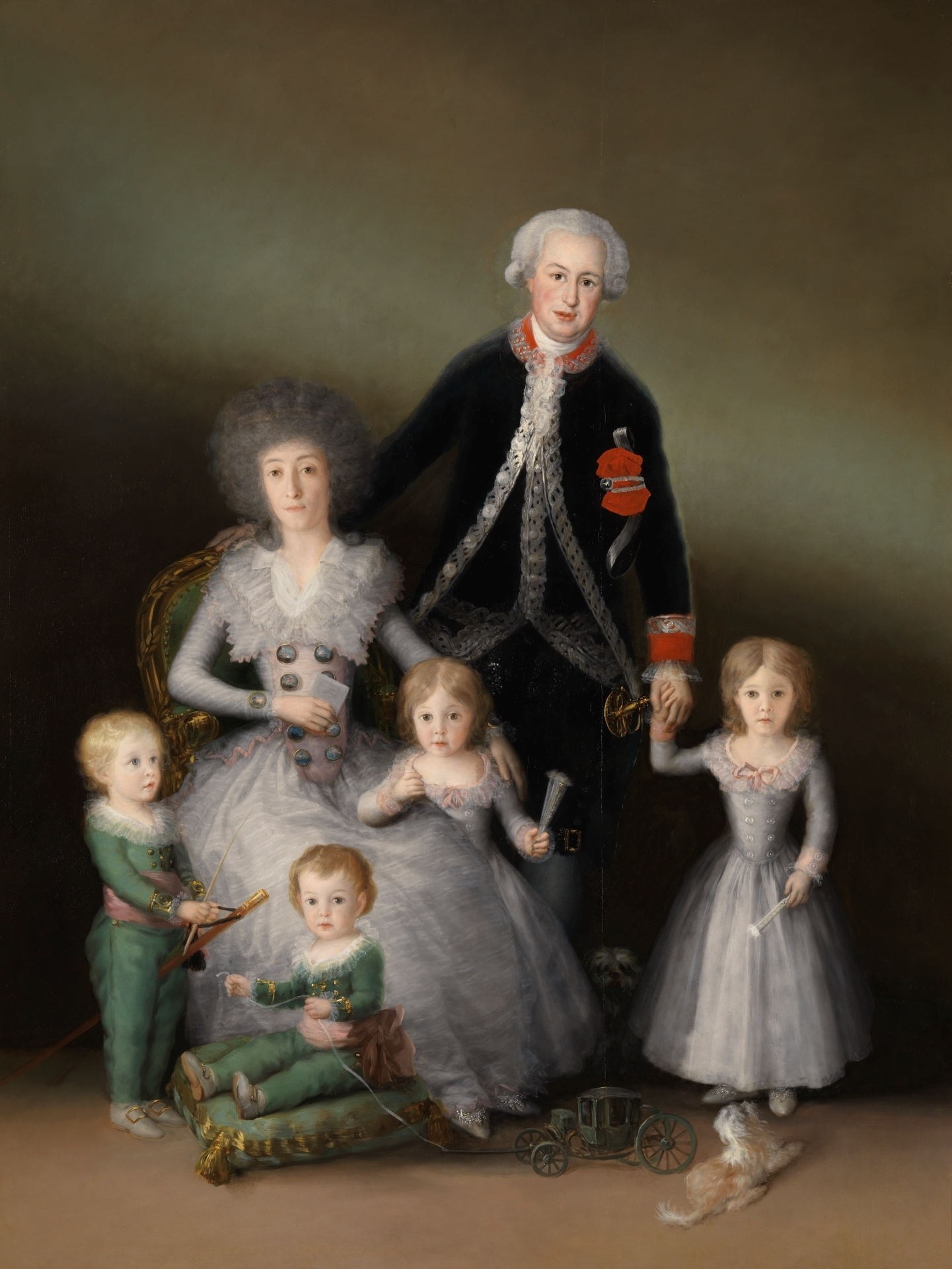
The Family of the Duke of Osuna. The red cockade is on his tricorne under the arm, 1788 (Museo del Prado)

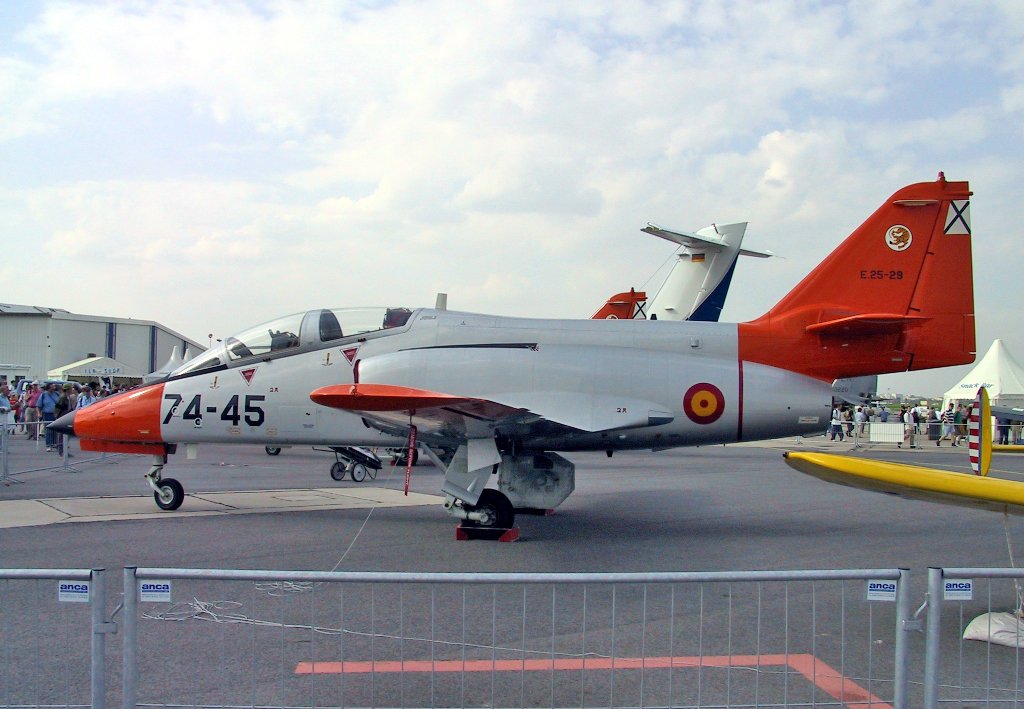
Spanish Air Force CASA C-101 Aviojet with the cockade painted on the fuselage

== See also ==
- Roundel of the Spanish Republican Air Force
