= Crime in Peru =

Peru
- Crime rates* (2017)

Violent crimes
- Homicide: 7.8*

Property crimes
- Motor vehicle theft: 18,106
- Notes *Number of reported crimes per 100,000 population. Source: INEI Statistical Yearbook of Crime and Citizen Security 2011–2017

Crime in Peru has steadily decreased since the 2010s and into the 2020s. Peru's main indicators of crime are the homicide rate and the victimization rate; the victimization rate dropped from forty percent in 2011 to under twenty five percent in 2020.

== Crime by type ==
=== Murder ===
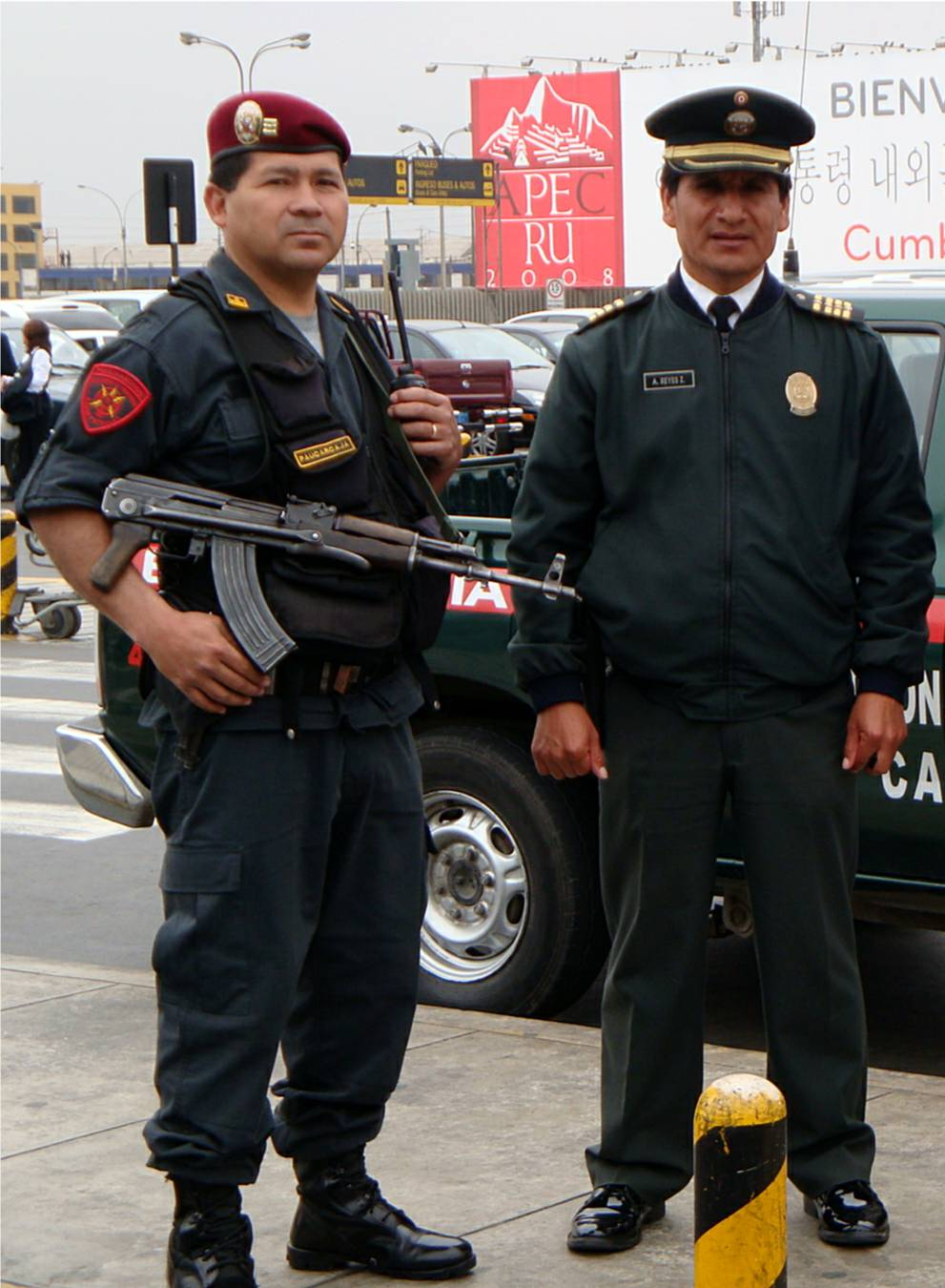
Officers of the Peruvian National Police.

In 2012, Peru had a murder rate of 9.6 per 100,000 population. There were a total of 1,986 murders in Peru in 2012. By 2015, this had declined to 7.2-7.32 per 100,000, with 2,247 murders recorded.

=== Corruption ===
Peru's most prominent political corruption scandal is probably the case of Alberto Fujimori, Peru's ex-President. Fujimori has been convicted of having ordered killings, embezzlement of public funds, abuse of power and corruption during his 10 years of presidency (1990–2000). In 2006, Fujimori fled to Japan with an alleged US$600 million of public assets. He has been sentenced to a total of more than 30 years in prison.

=== Domestic violence ===
In 2006, Ministry of Women and Social Development (MIMDES) centers reported 25,036 cases of domestic violence in Peru. The centers helped an average of 2,067 men and women per month. MIMDES also operated a toll-free hot line, which handled 7,785 requests for assistance regarding family disturbances during 2006.

Women's organizations noted that alcohol abuse and traditional attitudes toward women aggravated the problems of rape and sexual abuse, particularly in rural areas. In November 2006, the World Health Organization reported that 69 percent of Peruvian women said they had suffered from some form of physical violence in their lives.

A 2013 study by University of San Martín de Porres found that violence against women cost per US$6.7 billion annually due to the loss of productivity.

=== Illegal drug trade ===
The illegal drug trade in Peru includes the growing of coca and the shipment of cocaine to the United States. In 2013, the United Nations reported that Peru had become the largest producer of cocaine in the world.

== Law and justice system ==
The Ministry of the Interior is the main interior authority within Peru, overseeing the Peruvian National Police. The Judicial Power of Peru oversees the judiciary of Peru, with the Superior Courts of Justice of Peru assuming the role of trying criminal cases. The Instituto Nacional Penitenciario is the government authority tasked with the incarceration of criminals within the country.
