= Telecommunications in Peru =

Telecommunications in Peru include radio and television, fixed and mobile telephones, and the Internet.

== Regulation ==
The technical regulator of communications in Peru is the Presidency of the Minister Council, through the Organismo Supervisor de la Inversión Privada en Telecomunicaciones (OSIPTEL) in English, Supervisory Agency for Private Investment in Telecommunications. The Ministry of Transport and Communications grants concessions, authorizations, permits and licenses.

The resale of telecommunication services is permitted as a regulated activity. Voice Over IP (VoIP) services are not expressly regulated, but may need a concession or a registry depending on the type of service provided. Carrier interconnection is mandatory and interconnection fees are regulated. The Peruvian government maintains a Telecommunications Investment Fund (FITEL) to promote universal service within the country's most isolated regions, including rural areas and areas of social interest. Following the successful implementation of mobile number portability, the government requires fixed number portability be launched by July 2014.

All telecommunication services have been liberalized and are rendered under a free competition regime according to the Telecommunications Law. Under Peru's single concession regime all telecom services, including fixed-line, mobile, pay TV, and Internet, are provided under unified concessions that cover the entire country.

Privatization began in 1994 when the state-owned companies Compañía Peruana de Teléfonos S.A. (CPT) and Entel Perú were auctioned to Telefónica de España. In December 1994, Entel Perú was merged into CPT. In 1995, CPT changed its name to Telefónica del Perú S.A. (TdP). Telefónica del Perú continues to dominate the market for basic telephone services.

The operation of broadcasting companies is governed by the Law of Radio and Television (Law Nº 28278). Spectrum is managed and controlled by the Ministry of Transport and Communications (MTC).

== Radio and television ==
- Radio stations: More than 2,000 radio stations, including a substantial number of indigenous language stations (2010).
- Radios: 24 million (2005).
- TV networks: 10 major TV networks of which only one, TV Perú, is state-owned; multi-channel cable TV services are available (2010).
- Television sets: 5.5 million (2003).
- Pay television subscribers: 2,015,805 (September 2019).
- Broadcast television system: NTSC, NTSC broadcasts to be abandoned by 31 December 2017, simulcasting ISDB-Tb.

== Telephones ==
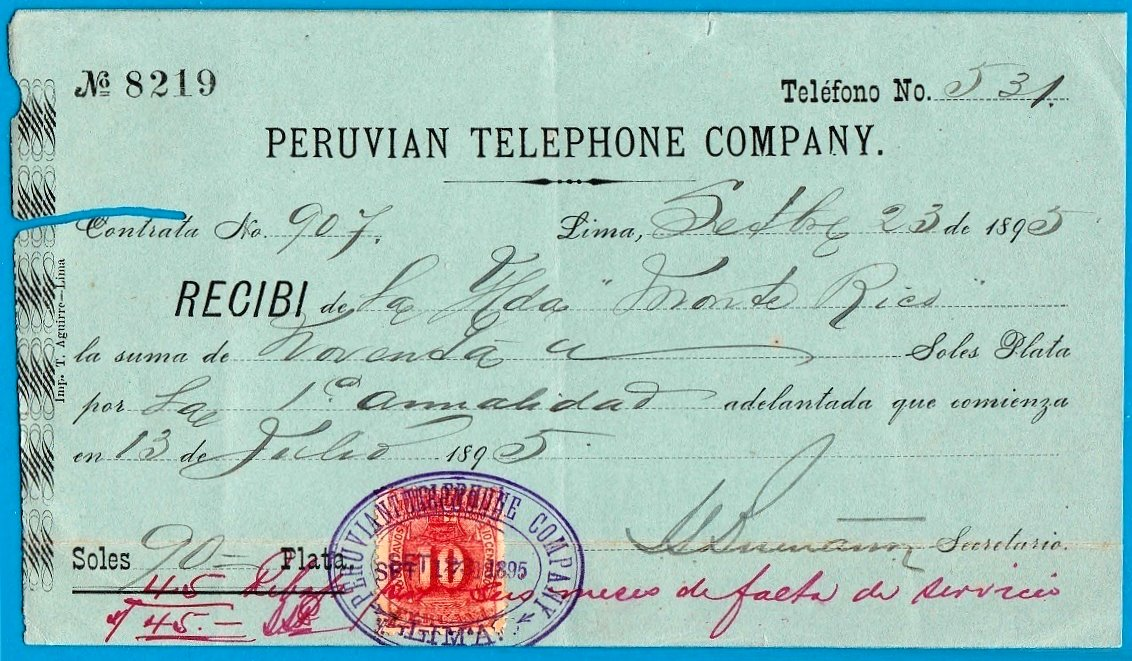
A document from the Peruvian Telephone Company, Lima, 1895.

- Calling code: +51.
- International call prefix: 00
- Fixed lines: 3.4 million lines in use (2012).
- Fixed-line teledensity: about 12 per 100 persons (2010).
- Mobile subscribers: 15.2 million unique subscribers (end of 2013).
- Mobile lines: 29.4 million (2012), 29.6 million (2013).
- Mobile teledensity: exceeds 100 telephones per 100 persons, spurred by competition among multiple providers (2010).
- Domestic system: nationwide microwave radio relay system and a domestic satellite system with 12 earth stations, which is adequate for most requirements (2010).
- International communication cables: South America-1 (SAm-1) and Pan American (PAN-AM) submarine cables link to parts of Central and South America, the Caribbean, and the US (2010).
- International satellite earth stations: 2 Intelsat (Atlantic Ocean) (2010).

Peru's fixed-line penetration is the third lowest in South America after Bolivia and Paraguay. Barriers include widespread poverty, expensive services, little meaningful competition, and the geographical barriers imposed by the Andean mountains and Amazon jungles.

Under the name Movistar, Telefónica del Perú dominates the basic telephone market. América Móvil’s Claro occupies second place, while Americatel Peru is third with roughly 1% of the market. The remaining companies have market shares below 0.3%.

Mobile penetration is below the regional average, with about one quarter of the population having no mobile phone at all, while others, primarily in urban areas, have multiple subscriptions.

Telefónica, operating as Movistar, is the mobile leader; América Móvil, operating as Claro, is second; and Mobile Perú is third. Vietnam's Viettel is expected to begin offering mobile services in the second half of 2014 and Virgin Mobile is expected to enter the market as a Mobile Virtual Network Operator (MVNO).

== Internet ==
- Top-level domain: .pe.
- Internet service providers (ISPs): 158 providers (2005).
- Internet hosts: 234,102 hosts (2012).
- Internet users: 11.3 million users, 37th in the world; 38.2% of the population, 115th in the world (2012).
- Fixed broadband: 1.4 million subscriptions, 49th in the world; 4.8% of the population, 107th in the world (2012).
- Mobile broadband: 820,295 subscriptions, 77th in the world; 2.8% of the population, 121st in the world (2012).

Peru enjoyed a remarkably high dial-up Internet penetration rate, but broadband Internet penetration is more than two-thirds below the average for Latin America and Caribbean countries. Barriers include widespread poverty, limited literacy, limited computer ownership and access, rugged topography and, perhaps most significant, a lack of meaningful competition which has made broadband Internet access in Peru one of the slowest and most expensive in the region.

=== Internet censorship and surveillance ===
In 2011 the OpenNet Initiative reported no evidence of Internet filtering in all areas (political, social, conflict/security, and Internet tools) for which it tests.

There are no government restrictions on access to the Internet or credible reports that the government monitors e-mail or Internet chat rooms without appropriate legal authority. Individuals and groups engage in the free expression of views via the Internet, including by e-mail. The chief impediment to Internet access is a lack of infrastructure.

The constitution provides for freedom of speech and press, and the government generally respects these rights. Generally, an independent press and a functioning democratic political system combine to promote freedom of speech and press. A number of journalists and media outlets report experiencing threats or intimidation. Some observers claim that media outlets self-censor for fear of harassment or violence. The Press and Society Institute (IPYS) reports that the aggressors are often government officials (e.g., mayors, heads of government offices, regional presidents). The penal code criminalizes libel, and officials reportedly use it to intimidate reporters. The law designates all information about national security and defense as secret. Press freedom activists and local NGOs, such as IPYS, criticized the law as an attack on transparency, freedom of information, and freedom of the press.

In October 2013 the government passed a cybercrime law designed to combat data sharing and the illegal access of information. The Press and Society Institute (IPYS) and other local NGOs criticized the law as legally ambiguous and argued that it could be used broadly to target journalists and limit freedom of the press.

== See also ==
- Media of Peru
