= Cockade =

Rosette or knot of ribbon used as an ornament

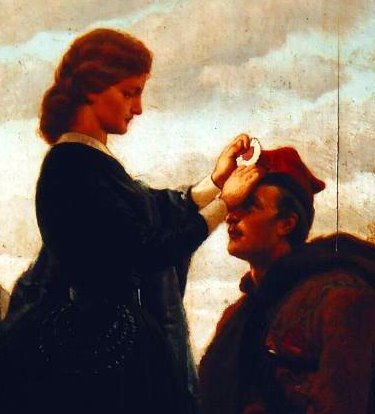
A woman fastening a red-and-white cockade to a Polish insurgent's square-shaped rogatywka cap during the January Uprising of 1863–64

A cockade is a knot of ribbons, or other circular- or oval-shaped symbol of distinctive colours which is usually worn on a hat or cap. The word cockade derives from the French cocarde, from Old French coquarde, feminine of coquard (vain, arrogant), from coc (cock), of imitative origin. The earliest documented use was in 1709.

The first cockades were introduced in Europe in the 15th century. The armies of the European states used them to signal the nationality of their soldiers to distinguish allies from enemies. These first cockades were inspired by the distinctive coloured bands and ribbons that were used in the Late Middle Ages by knights, both in war and in tournaments, which had the same purpose, namely to distinguish the opponent from the fellow soldier.

The cockade later became a widespread revolutionary symbol par excellence during the Age of Revolutions of the 18th and 19th centuries. Its main characteristic was that of being able to be clearly visible, thus giving way to unequivocally identify the political ideas of the person who wore it, as well as that of being, in case of need, better hideable than, for example, a flag.

== 18th century ==
The cockade of France, which originated and spread among the revolts of the French Revolution

The cockade of Italy, on which the national colours of Italy were based in 1789

In the 18th and 19th centuries, coloured cockades were used in Europe to show the allegiance of their wearers to some political faction, or to show their rank or to indicate a servant's livery. Because individual armies might wear a variety of differing regimental uniforms, cockades were used as an effective and economical means of national identification.

A cockade was pinned on the side of a man's tricorne or cocked hat, or on his lapel. Women could also wear it on their hat or in their hair.

In pre-revolutionary France, the cockade of the Bourbon dynasty was all white. In the Kingdom of Great Britain supporters of a Jacobite restoration wore white cockades, while the recently established Hanoverian monarchy used a black cockade. The Hanoverians also accorded the right to all German nobility to wear the black cockade in the United Kingdom.

During the 1780 Gordon Riots in London, the blue cockade became a symbol of anti-government feelings and was worn by most of the rioters.

During the American Revolution, the Continental Army initially wore cockades of various colors as an ad hoc form of rank insignia, as General George Washington wrote:

As the Continental Army has unfortunately no uniforms, and consequently many inconveniences must arise from not being able to distinguish the commissioned officers from the privates, it is desired that some badge of distinction be immediately provided; for instance that the field officers may have red or pink colored cockades in their hats, the captains yellow or buff, and the subalterns green.

Before long however, the Continental Army reverted to wearing the black cockade they inherited from the British. Later, when France became an ally of the United States, the Continental Army pinned the white cockade of the French Ancien Régime onto their old black cockade; the French reciprocally pinned the black cockade onto their white cockade, as a mark of the French-American alliance. The black-and-white cockade thus became known as the "Union Cockade".

In the Storming of the Bastille, Camille Desmoulins initially encouraged the revolutionary crowd to wear green. This colour was later rejected as it was associated with the Count of Artois. Instead, revolutionaries would wear cockades with the traditional colours of the arms of Paris: red and blue. Later, the Bourbon white was added to this cockade, thus producing the original cockade of France. Later, distinctive colours and styles of cockade would indicate the wearer's faction; although the meanings of the various styles were not entirely consistent, and they varied somewhat by region and period.

The cockade of Italy is one of the national symbols of the country and is composed of the three colours of the Italian flag with the green in the centre, the white immediately outside and the red on the edge. The cockade, a revolutionary symbol, was the protagonist of the uprisings that characterized the Italian unification, being pinned on the jacket or on the hats in its tricolour form by many of the patriots of this period of Italian history. The Italian tricolour cockade appeared for the first time in Genoa on 21 August 1789, and with it the colours of the three Italian national colours. Seven years later, the first tricolour military banner was adopted by the Lombard Legion in Milan on 11 October 1796, and eight years later, the birth of the flag of Italy had its origins on 7 January 1797, when it became for the first time a national flag of an Italian sovereign State, the Cispadane Republic.

== European military ==
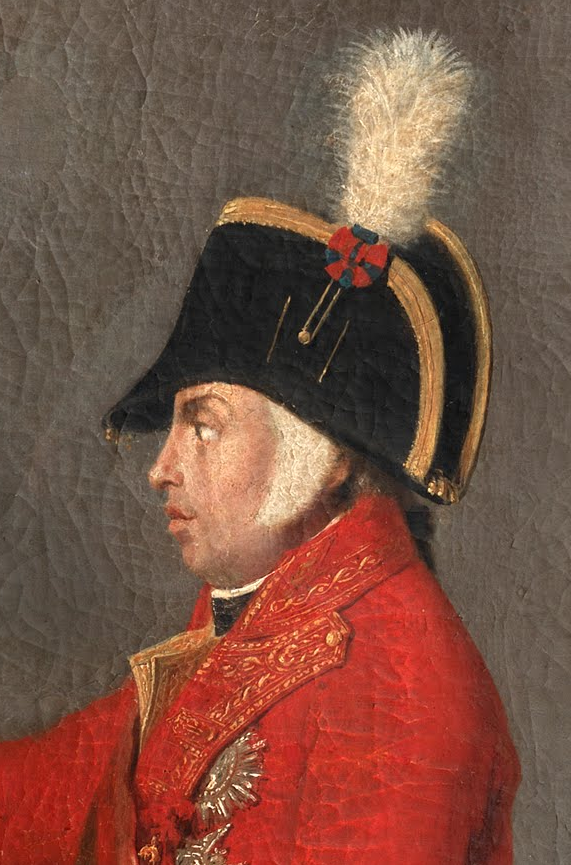
John VI of Portugal wearing the blue-and-red cockade of Portugal on a military cocked hat

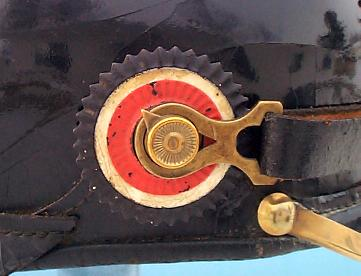
A metal cockade on the swivel of a Pickelhaube helmet.

From the 15th century, various European monarchy realms used cockades to denote the nationalities of their militaries. Their origin reverts to the distinctive colored band or ribbon worn by late medieval armies or jousting knights on their arms or headgear to distinguish friend from foe in the field of battle. Ribbon-style cockades were worn later upon helmets and brimmed hats or tricornes and bicornes just as the French did, and also on cocked hats and shakoes. Coloured metal cockades were worn at the right side of helmets; while small button-type cockades were worn at the front of kepis and peaked caps. In addition to the significance of these symbols in denoting loyalty to a particular monarch, the coloured cockade served to provide a common and economical field sign at a time when the colours of uniform coats might vary widely between regiments in a single army.

During the Napoleonic Wars, the armies of France and Russia, had the imperial French cockade or the larger cockade of St. George pinned on the front of their shakos.

The Second German Empire (1870–1918) used two cockades on each army headgear: one (black-white-red) for the empire; the other for one of the monarchies the empire was composed of, which had used their own colors long before. The only exceptions were the Kingdoms of Bavaria and Württemberg, having preserved the right to keep their own armed forces which were not integrated in the Imperial Army. Their only cockades were either white-blue-white (Bavaria) or black-red-black (Württemberg).

The Weimar Republic (1919–1933) removed these, as they might promote separatism which would lead to the dissolution of the German nation-state into regional countries again. When the Nazis came to power, they rejected the democratic German colours of black-red-gold used by the Weimar Republic. Nazis reintroduced the imperial colours (in German: die kaiserlichen Farben or Reichsfarben) of black on the outside, white next, and a red center. The Nazi government used black-white-red on all army caps. These colours represented the biggest and the smallest countries of the Reich: large Prussia (black and white) and the tiny Hanseatic League city states of Hamburg, Bremen and Lübeck (white and red).

Cockade on a Danish M/1915 Kepi

France began the first Air Service in 1909 and soon picked the traditional French cockade as the first national emblem, now usually termed a roundel, on military aircraft. During World War I, other countries adopted national cockades and used these coloured emblems as roundels on their military aircraft. These designs often bear an additional central device or emblem to further identify national aircraft, those from the French navy bearing a black anchor within the French cockade.

Hungarian revolutionaries wore cockades during the Hungarian revolution of 1848 and during the 1956 revolution. Because of this, Hungarians traditionally wear cockades on 15 March.

== Confederate States ==
Echoing their use when Americans rebelled against Britain, cockades – usually made with blue ribbons and worn on clothing or hats – were widespread tokens of Southern support for secession preceding the American Civil War of 1861–1865.

== List of national cockades ==
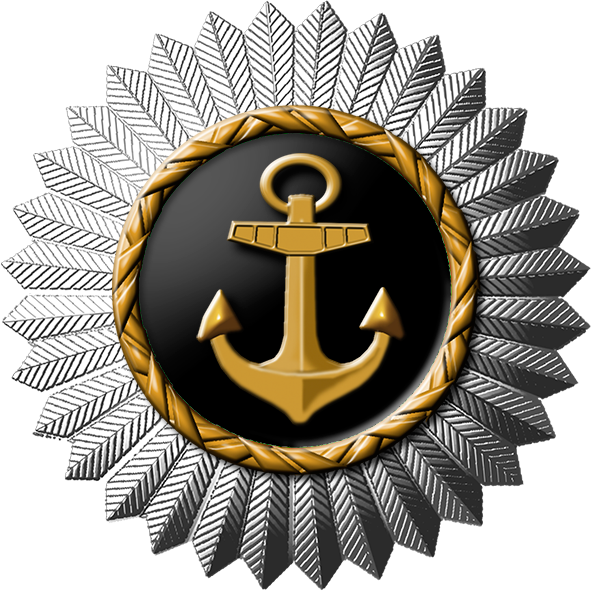
Cockade on the caps of certified persons serving in the pilot service of Russia, 1913.

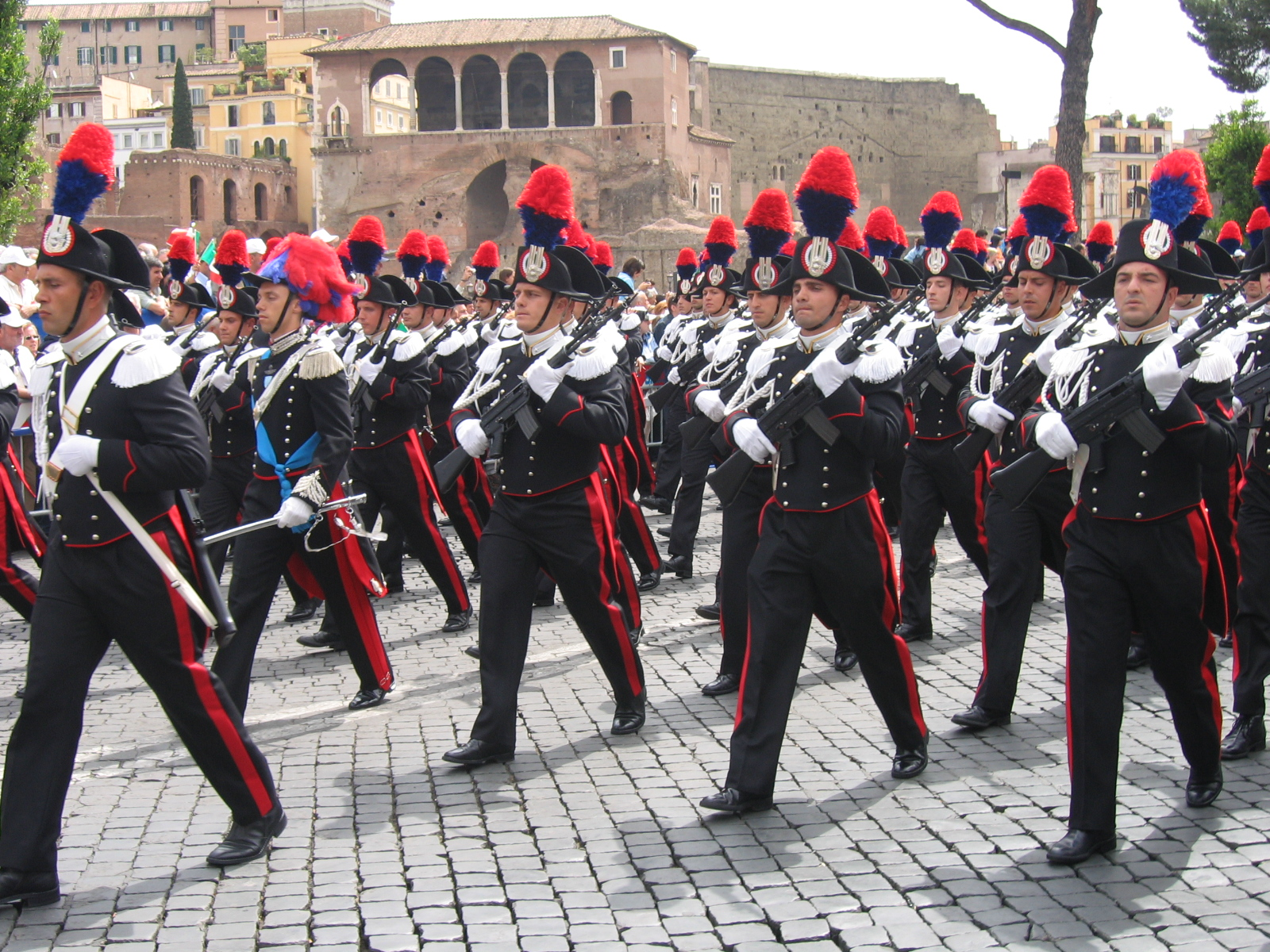
Carabinieri in full uniform at the military parade of the Festa della Repubblica of 2 June 2006. On their hat, under the coat of arms, is the cockade of Italy.

1950's Infantry Cockade on a Danish 1940 dated Gardehusar Side Cap

Below is a list of national and subnational cockades (colors listed from center to ring):

National cockades
Image	Country and date	Description
	Albania	red-black-red
	Antigua and Barbuda	black-gold-blue-white-red
	Argentina	sky blue-white-sky blue
	Armenia	orange-blue-red
	Austrian Empire before 1918	black-gold
	Austria since 1918	red-white-red
	Azerbaijan	green-red-light blue
	Bangladesh	gold-red-green
	Belgium	black-yellow-red
	Bolivia (1825–1826)	green-red-green (with a white five-pointed star in the center)
	Bolivia (1826–1851)	green-red-yellow
	Bolivia	green-yellow-red
	Brazil	blue-yellow-green
	Bulgaria	red-green-white
	Chile	blue-white-red (with a white five-pointed star in the blue portion)
	Colombia	yellow-blue-red
	Croatia	red-white-blue
	Denmark (early 19th century)	black
	Denmark	red-white-red
	Ecuador	red-blue-yellow
	Egypt (1922–1953)	green-white-green
	Egypt	black-white-red
	Estonia	white-black-blue
	Ethiopia (until 1936)	green-yellow-red
	Ethiopia	red-yellow-green
	Finland	white-blue-white
	France (1794–1814, 1815 and current since 1830)	blue-white-red
	France (before 1794, 1814–1815 and 1815–1830)	white
	Gabon	green-yellow-light blue
	Georgia (1990–2004)	black-white-wine red
	German Confederation (1848–1871)	gold-red-black
	German Empire (1871–1918); Weimar Germany (1918–1933); Nazi Germany (1933–1945)	red-white-black
	East Germany (1956–1959); Germany	black-red-gold
	Ghana	green-yellow-red
	Greece (1822)	white-blue-white
	Greece (1833)	blue-white
	Greece	blue-white
	Hungary	green-white-red
	Iceland	blue-white-red-white-blue
	India	green-white-saffron
	Iran	red-white-green
	Ireland (until 1922)	green or sky blue
	Ireland (since 1922)	green-white-orange
	Italy (1861–1948)	savoy blue
	Italy (since 1948)	green-white-red
	Japan	red-white
	Kenya	green-white-red-white-black
	Latvia	carmine-white-carmine
	Lithuania	red-green-yellow
	Mexico	green-white-red
	Monaco	white-red-white
	Moravia	red-white-blue
	Netherlands	orange
	Nigeria	green-white-green
	Norway	red-white-blue-white
	Pakistan	white-green-yellow
	Paraguay	blue-white-red
	Peru	red-white-red
	Philippines (1898–1901)	silver-blue-red (the silver part being a metal insignia pin)
	Poland	red-white
	Portugal (until 1797)	green-white
	Portugal (1797–1820 and 1823–1830)	blue-red
	Portugal (1821–1823 and 1830–1910)	blue-white
	Portugal	green-red
	Romania	blue-yellow-red
	Russia (until 1917)	black-orange-black-orange-white
	Russia	black-orange-black-orange
	San Marino	white-blue
	Serbia	red-blue-white
	Seychelles (1978–1996)	green-white-red
	Sierra Leone	light blue-white-green
	Slovenia	red-blue-white
	Spain (until 1843 and 1844–1871)	red
	Spain (1843–1844 and current since 1871)	red-yellow-red
	Sweden (military)	yellow
	Sweden (civilian)	blue-yellow
	Thailand	red-white-blue-white-red
	(South Africa) Transvaal	green-red-white-blue
	Turkey	red-white-red
	Ukraine	light blue-yellow
	United Kingdom	white (Stuart dynasty), black (Hanoverian dynasty), red-white-blue
	United States (War of Independence)	white-black
	United States (19th century)	blue with an eagle in the center
	United States	white-blue-red
	Uruguay (1828–1916)	sky blue
	Uruguay (civilian)	blue-white-blue-white-blue-white-blue-white
	Uruguay (military)	blue-white-blue with a red diagonal line
	Uruguay (police)	red-white-blue
	Venezuela	red-blue-yellow
	Yugoslavia	blue-white-red

=== Component states of the German Empire (1871–1918) ===
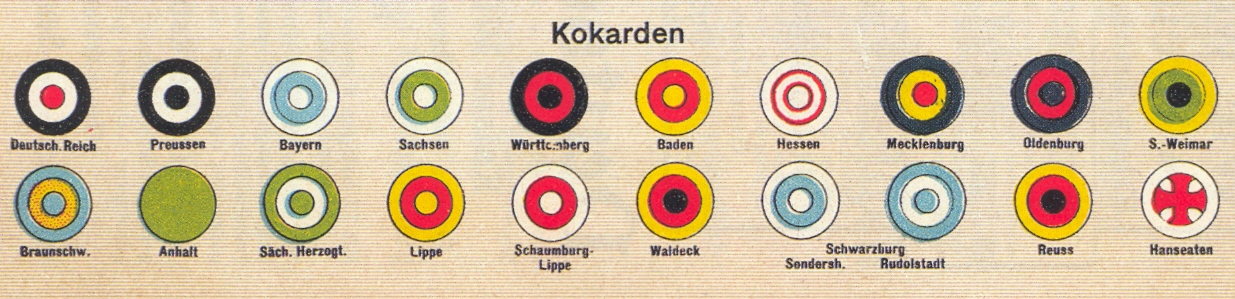
Cockades of the German Empire

The German Empire had, besides the national cockade, also cockades for several of its states, seen in the following table:

State	Description
Anhalt	green
Baden	yellow-red-yellow
Bavaria	white-sky blue-white
Brunswick	blue-yellow-blue
Hanseatic cities (Bremen, Hamburg, Lübeck)	white with a red cross
Hesse	white-red-white-red-white
Lippe	yellow-red-yellow
Mecklenburg-Schwerin and -Streliz	red-yellow-blue
Oldenburg	blue-red-blue
Prussia	black-white-black
Reuss-Gera and -Greiz	black-red-yellow
Saxe-Altenburg, -Coburg and Gotha and -Meiningen	green-white-green
Saxe-Weimar	black-yellow-green
Saxony	white-green-white
Schaumburg-Lippe	blue-red-white
Schwarzburg-Rudolstadt	blue-white-blue
Schwarzburg-Sonderhausen	white-blue-white
Waldeck	black-red-yellow
Württemberg	black-red-black

== See also ==
- Cap badge
- Rosette (politics)
- Roundel

== Sources ==
- Adye, Ralph Willett (1802). The Little Bombardier, and Pocket Gunner. T. Egerton.
- Lucchetti, Marco (2014). 1001 curiosità sulla storia che non ti hanno mai raccontato (in Italian). Newton Compton. ISBN 978-88-541-7155-8.
- Troiani, Don; Kochan, James; Coates, Earl (1998). Soldiers in America, 1754–1865. Stackpole Books. ISBN 978-0-8117-0519-6.
