= Economic history of Peru =

Historic real GDP per capita in Peru

The industries of the economy of Peru arose in response to the country's rich natural resources. During the regime of the Inca Empire, the economy was centrally planned, and labour was mandatory. Spanish explorers held the Incan system in much regard.

Today, Peru has important mineral resources, which are found throughout its mountainous and coastal regions. The country is the world's second-largest producer of silver and copper. From 2016 to 2017, mining output increased, helping Peru attain one of the highest GDP growth rates in Latin America. Peru's prominent industries include mining, farming, fishing, and agriculture.

== Incan Empire (pre-16th century) ==
Quipu were used by the Inca for economic record keeping.

The Incan economy was centered around the ayllu, a local group composed of neighboring families in the same village. Every ayllu specialized in a certain industry, such as agriculture, pottery, clothing, or jewellery. People did collective community work in a system known as the minka, which involved construction, cleaning, or attending to other needs of the society at large. Since there was no official currency, taxes were collected in the form of crops, cattle, and labor.

== Spanish colony (16th–18th centuries) ==
While the Spanish Empire ruled the region, Peru's economy was dominated by minerals. The enslavement of indigenous peoples provided the initial labor force. Peru's precious mineral resources and large indigenous population placed it at the core of the South American colonies. According to Palmer, Peru could be ranked second on a scale that compares the degree to which colonies were exploited. Minerals from Peru and other South American colonies along with textiles and sugar were exported back to Europe.

After the War of the Spanish Succession in the early 18th century, Spain began to lose its monopoly in colonial trade. In the mid-18th century, liberal factions began to appear within the colonial elite; they questioned the legitimacy of Spanish rule in the Americas. Called "Creole patriots", the factions were originally marginalized to the periphery of the empire in places such as Venezuela; consequently, they experienced expanded trade opportunities. They provided the necessary conditions for successful economic development, however, during the late colonial period. The introduction of free trade led to explosive growth throughout the empire; by the end of the century, Spain received ten times more imports. Despite the overall growth of the colonies, Peru's economy stagnated in the period that lasted about 150 years after the Peruvian War of Independence. The regional socioeconomic hierarchy inverted itself because core territories where liberals were absent experienced much lower levels of economic development. Author James Mahoney writes:

[R]egional specialists have argued that underdevelopment throughout [areas such as Peru] can be traced to colonial patterns of economic dependence, Hispanic culture, and inefficient markets and economic arrangements.

The Spanish crown, attempting to protect its colonial possessions and reverse its faltering role in colonial trade, implemented liberal reforms, hastening the removal of trade restrictions and weakening colonial monopolies. These actions continued the decay of the core regions, leaving them more exposed to the uncertainties of the free market. By the mid-19th century, the reversal of the socioeconomic hierarchy was complete. Peru has never recovered supremacy similar to that of the Viceroyalty era.

== 19th century ==
After the country gained its independence, Peru embarked on a railroad building program. Entrepreneur Henry Meiggs built a standard gauge line from Callao, a seaside city, across the Andes to the Huancayo in the highlands. Aiming for Cusco in the Andes, he built the line but also bankrupted the country.

In 1879, Peru entered the War of the Pacific, which lasted until 1884. The war pushed inflation to nearly 180 percent at its highest level during the war.

Bolivia invoked its alliance with Peru against Chile. The Peruvian government tried to mediate the dispute by sending a diplomatic team to negotiate with the Chilean government, but the committee concluded that war was inevitable. Chile declared war on April 5, 1879. Almost five years of war ended with the loss of Tarapacá Province, and the provinces in the Atacama region of Tacna and Arica. Originally, Chile committed to a referendum for the cities of Arica and Tacna to be held years later to self-determine their national affiliation. However, Chile refused to apply the Treaty, and both countries could not determine the statutory framework. The USA decided that the plebiscite was impossible to take; direct negotiations between the parties led to the treaty Treaty of Lima in 1929, where Peru ceded Arica to Chile and Tacna remained in Peru. Tacna officially returned to Peru on August 29, 1929. The territorial loss, extensive looting of Peruvian cities by Chilean troops, and other effects of the war led to tense diplomatic relations between the two countries, which have not since fully subsided.

After the War of the Pacific, the Peruvian government initiated social and economic reforms to recover from the damage of the war. The country finally attained political stability in the early 20th century.

== 20th century ==
Industrialization took place in Peru during the 1930s and 1940s, substantially later than in comparative Latin American countries.

=== World War I ===
Before the start of World War I, Peru had enjoyed years of economic growth bolstered by sugar, mining and cotton exports. With the start of the war Peru's export economy was severely impacted by disruption in international markets.

=== Military rule (1948–1980) ===
On October 29, 1948, General Manuel A. Odría became the new president after a military coup. Due to a thriving economy, Odría implemented expensive, populist social reconstruction, whose programs included housing projects, hospitals, and schools. His government was dictatorial, however, and civil rights were severely restricted. Corruption was rampant throughout his regime.

Various military juntas continued to rule Peru over the next three decades. The economic policies of the 1950s, 1960s, and 1970s were based on the substitution of imports and had little effect on the size of the economy. General Francisco Morales Bermúdez replaced leftist General Juan Velasco Alvarado in 1975, citing Velasco's economic mismanagement among other reasons. The regime of Bermúdez was a more conservative period, beginning the task of restoring the country's economy.

=== Belaúnde presidency (1980–1985) ===
In 1980, after many years of military rule, Fernando Belaúnde Terry was elected president. After a strong beginning, his popularity eroded under the stress of inflation, economic hardship, and terrorism. The government's attempt to liberalize the economy failed, partly because of the Latin American debt crisis. Per-capita income declined, and Peru's foreign debt grew. Violence by leftist insurgents, notably Shining Path, rose steadily during the internal conflict in Peru. The first large insurgent activities began the day before Belaúnde's election. Belaúnde continued many of the projects that were planned during his 1963–1968 term, including the completion of the Carretera Marginal de la Selva, a roadway linking Chiclayo on the Pacific coast with the then-isolated northern regions of Amazonas and San Martín.

Over time, the economic problems left behind by the various junta governments persisted. The El Niño weather phenomenon from 1982 to 1983 further eroded the economy, causing widespread flooding in some parts of the country and severe droughts in others, and decimating the schools of ocean fish that were one of the country's major resources.

=== First García presidency (1985–1990) ===
Belaúnde's successor, Alan García, was elected to office in 1985. His administration applied heterodox policies through the expansion of public expenditure and limitations on external debt payments. With a parliamentary majority for the first time in the American Popular Revolutionary Alliance's history, García's administration showed economic promise, much as Belaúnde's had. However, despite his initial popularity, García's term in office was marked by bouts of hyperinflation, which reached 7,649% in 1990 and had a cumulative total of 2,200,200% over his five-year term, and profoundly destabilized the Peruvian economy. As a result of chronic inflation, the Peruvian currency, the sol, was replaced by the inti in mid-1985, which itself was replaced by the nuevo sol in July 1991; the new currency had an equivalent value of one billion old soles. During García's administration, the per-capita annual income of Peruvians fell to $720, which was below 1960 levels, and Peru's GDP dropped by 20%. By the end of his term, the national reserves cumulatively were $900 million in debt.

García's term was also characterized by heavy increases in poverty. According to studies by the National Institute of Statistics and Informatics and the United Nations Development Programme, at the start of García's presidency, 41.6% of Peruvians lived in poverty. By 1991, this figure had increased to 55%. García also attempted to nationalize the banking and insurance industries. He angered the International Monetary Fund (IMF) and the international financial community by unilaterally declaring a limit on debt repayment equal to 10% of the gross national product, thereby isolating Peru from international financial markets. One of his projects, a multimillion-dollar metro for Lima, was not completed until 2011 because its construction was paralyzed for over 20 years until it was resumed in 2010.

==== Fujimori ====
Critics of García's presidency say that his many poor decisions in office created an environment that led to the rise of the authoritarian leader Alberto Fujimori, who came to power in 1990. Fujimori implemented drastic measures that caused inflation to drop from 7,650% in 1990 to 139% in 1991. Faced with opposition to his efforts, he dissolved Congress in the auto-golpe (self-coup) of April 5, 1992. He then revised the constitution and called for new congressional elections. Undertaking a process of economic liberalization, he ended price controls, discarded protectionism, eliminated restrictions on foreign direct investment, and privatized most state companies. The reforms allowed sustained economic growth, except for a slump after the 1997 Asian financial crisis.

== Modern era (1990–present) ==
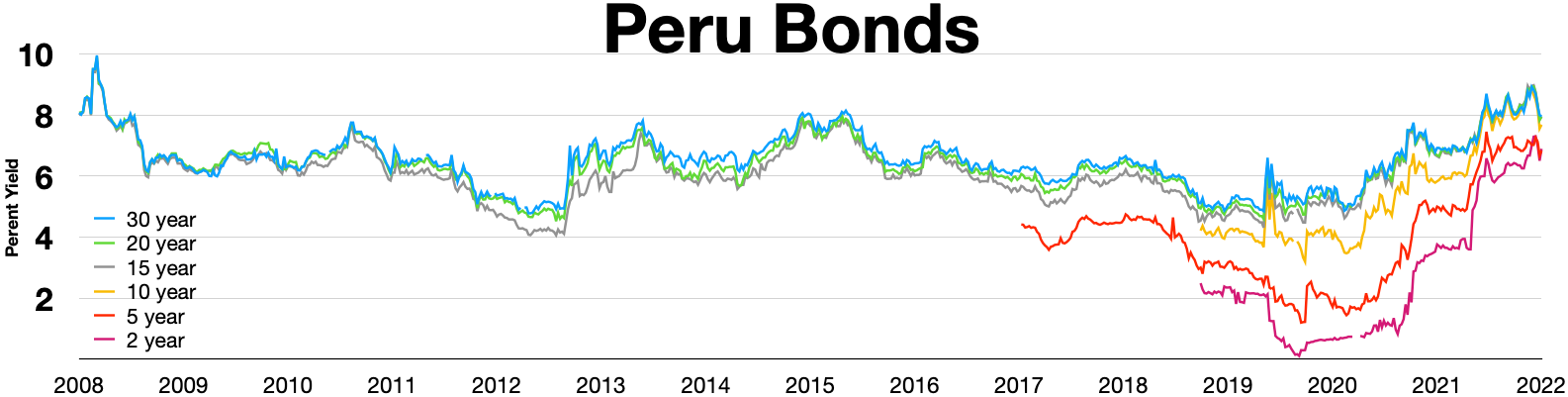
Peru bonds 30 year 20 year 15 year 10 year 5 year 2 year

Positive results in Peru's economy have begun to appear after 15 years, reflecting an expanding global economy. According to figures provided by the INEI, in 2007, during Alan García's second presidency, the gross national product grew by 8.99%; exports grew by over 35% and reached US$27.8 billion; private and public investments accounted for 21% of the GDP, growing even further to 24.4% in 2008; net international reserves, including gold, reached US$35.1 billion; state income from taxation increased by 33%; national debt scaled to GNP was reduced from 50% in 2000 to 34% in 2006; and the national budget grew by 50% in the five years before 2007.

Since 1990, the Peruvian economy has undergone free-market reforms, legalizing parts of the informal sector, and privatizing the mining, electricity, and telecommunications industries. Because of strong foreign investment, and cooperation between the Fujimori government and the IMR and World Bank, growth was strong in 1994–97, and inflation was brought under control. In 1998, El Niño's impact on agriculture, the financial crisis in Asia, and instability in Brazilian markets undercut growth. 1999 was another lean year for Peru due to the aftermath of El Niño and the Asian financial crisis. Lima completed negotiations for an Extended Fund Facility with the IMF in June 1999, although it subsequently had to renegotiate the targets.

Peru's per-capita growth rates have diverged from overall growth rates over the last quarter-century. Peru's GDP per capita peaked in 1981 and is only recently on the path to return to that level. By the end of 2006, the government had enacted measures that allowed the economy to improve by increasing investments, and expanding production and exports. Raw materials and agroindustrial products represent the bulk of potential exports. By 2020, investment is expected to total US$25 billion for mining activities; US$20 billion in energy, especially petroleum; US$12 billion for commerce; US$8 billion for agricultural industries; and US$5 billion for tourism.

== See also ==
- Economy of Peru
- Encomiendas of Peru
