= Peruvian (disambiguation) =

Peruvians are citizens of Peru.

Peruvian may also refer to:

== Relating to Peru ==
- Peruvian culture
- Peruvian cuisine
- Peruvian dances
- Peruvian guinea pig, breed of guinea pig
- Peruvian Spanish, the family of Spanish-language dialects spoken in Peru

== Other uses ==
- Peruvian, a ship wrecked off the NE Australian coast in 1846, leading to the stranding of James Morrill
- The Peruvian, a 1919 German silent film
