= International rankings of Peru =

International rankings

The following are international rankings of Peru:

== Economics ==
- A.T. Kearney/Foreign Policy: Globalization Index, ranked 50 out of 62 countries.
- The Heritage Foundation/The Wall Street Journal: Index of Economic Freedom, ranked 8 out of 157 countries.
- United Nations: Human Development Index, ranked 13 out of 177 countries
- World Economic Forum: Global Competitiveness Report Global Competitiveness Report 2011-2012, ranked 67 out of 142 countries.

== Globalization ==
- 2010 KOF Index of Globalization ranked 61

== Politics ==
- Reporters without borders: 2011-2012 Press Freedom Index, ranked 115 out of 179 countries
- Transparency International: 2011 Corruption Perceptions Index, ranked 80 out of 182 countries

== Technology ==
- World Intellectual Property Organization: Global Innovation Index 2026, ranked 80 out of 139 countries
