= Demographic history of Peru =

Demographics of Peru
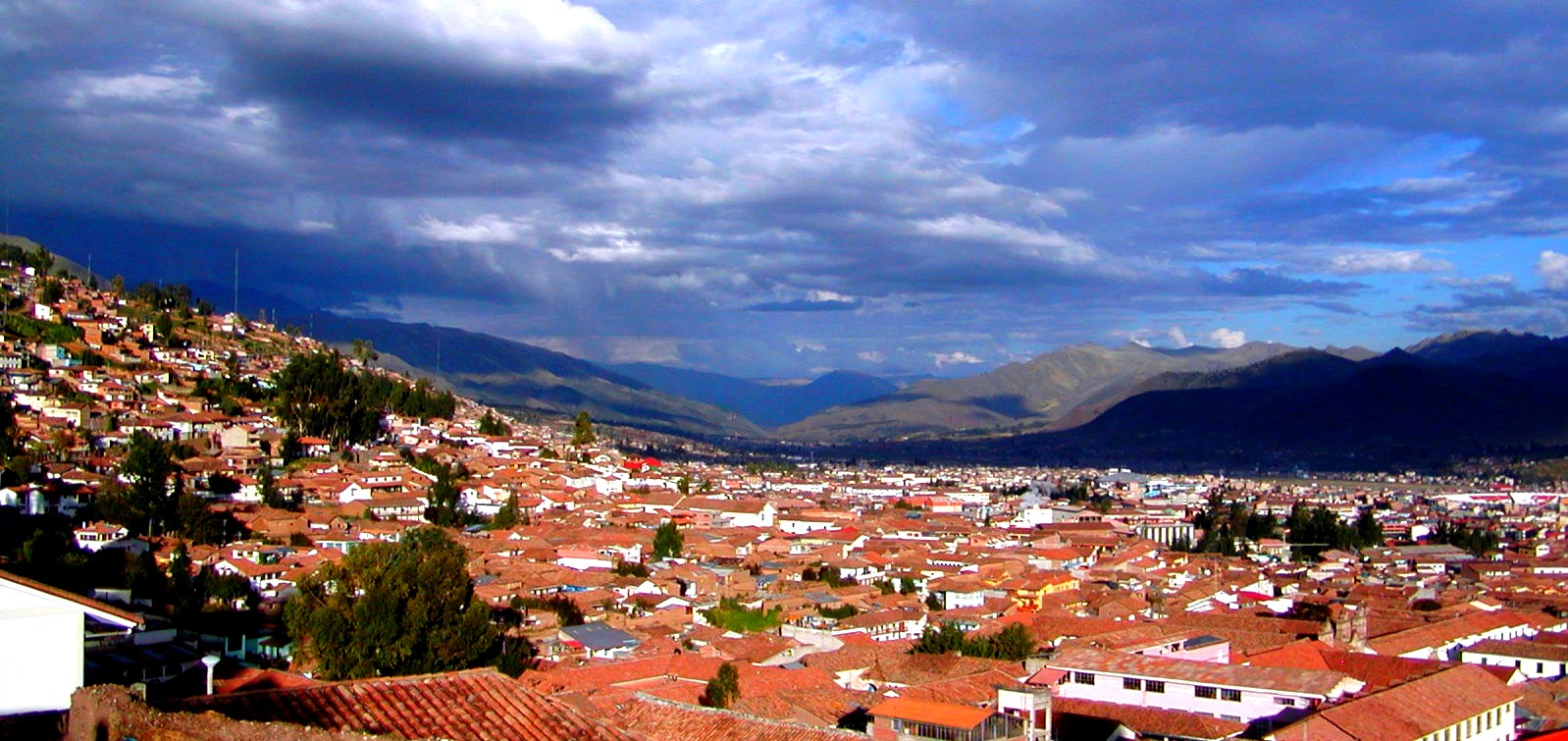
- Population: 32,971,854
- Density: 26.06
- Growth rate: 1.42%
- Birth rate: 574,987
- Death rate: 185,606
- Life expectancy: 76.95 years
  - male: 74.29 years
  - female: 79.71 years
- Fertility rate: 2.21
- Net migration rate: 3.12 per thousand

Nationality
- Nationality: Peruvian
- Major ethnic: Spaniards, Amerindians
- Minor ethnic: Chinese Peruvians, Japanese Peruvians

Language
- Official: Spanish
- Spoken: Aymara, Quechua

The demographic history of Peru shows the structure of the population in different historical periods. Peru's population drastically increased in the 1900s, with a diverse range of ethnic divisions living in the country. Lima is its capital city situated along the Pacific Ocean coast, where most of its population lives, and its population size is around 9.75 million. Major cities are located near the coastal areas of Peru. In terms of population and area size, it is the fourth and third largest country in South America, a place where the ancestral transcends and all forms of art combine. Peru became an independent country on July 28, 1821. However, Peru did not have a proper national census until 1876, more than a half-century after independence. They took the data before the federal census through different mediums but not on a national level. The significant migration in Peru consisted of Indigenous people, Europeans, enslaved Africans, and Asians; Spaniards were the first European who came to Peru, arrived in 1531, and discovered the Inca culture. The Incas established pre-Columbian America's greatest and most advanced kingdom and monarchy. However, native Americans were still in a larger proportion to total population.

Peru is a multi-cultural country with a diverse range of ethnic, religious, and languages divisions among people. The blending and diversity of cultural traditions has resulted in a vast range of artistic, culinary, literary, and musical expressions throughout the Peru. Culturally, Peru is known as one of the oldest civilizations in America. Francisco Pizarro and his conquerors came in Peru, and were known as the Chachapoya who then lived in tropical Andean cloud forests. Roman Catholicism is Peru's most widespread affiliated religion. However, other religions, such as Buddhism, Islam, Hinduism, and a trend of being irreligion are also common, especially among young people.

Peruvian history is often divided into pre-Columbian and post-Columbian eras.

== Census ==
The census takes the quantitative data of the population. The census in Peru takes place every ten years. The census of 1791 was a religious survey that was modified and published in consecutive official gazettes of the 1790s under Viceroy Gil de Taboada; in addition, the initial approximated count shows the total of 1,076,997 Peruvians, inclusive of whites, enslaved Black people, Pardo's, Mestizo's and with 609,000 Indigenous people. The lack of technological advancement in the late 18th and early 19th century resulted in an approximation of results. Furthermore, between 1825 and 1885, there was a transitional period in statistical history. Also, in 1797, the population census count shows 1,239,197 people with the addition of the southern Indian area of Puno and inhabitants from Northern Jaen; moreover, the next census of 1836 was occurred amid when the economy was in depression and combat of Peru's Caudillo era, concluded the total republican population of 1,373,736. Mostly, the people of Peru lived in rural areas in the 18th century. At the end of the 19th century, people started migrating to urban areas for a better lifestyle. The cities become extensive and populous because of poverty and prosperity issues in rural areas, and underdeveloped countries face mass urbanisation due to socioeconomic change. Also, big cities have relatively higher ratio of increasing population and the economic activities. Industrialisation and shortage of labor in the rapid expansion of industries in urban areas have also caused migration from rural to towns and cities. It was happening in Peru and globally; urbanisation became a trend. Since the population is rising rapidly, Peru's population reached 2,001,123 in 1850, with around 46% change from 1836; this would be the most significant drastic change since 1836. The population in 1876 was 2,699,106, when Peru had the modern census and had a war with Chile. The population of Peru fell from an estimated 4,000,000 in the 1500s to roughly 1,300,000 in the 1600s as a result of European contact and conquest. Smallpox had already severely devastated the Inca Empire before the arrival of the Spanish. This was primarily due to the unintentional spread of bacteria and infectious illnesses. Smallpox was vastly spread throughout the Inca Empire and affected millions of people due to its 30% mortality rate. The viral cause massive deaths in the surrounding regions, including Peru, which significantly declines the overall population numbers.

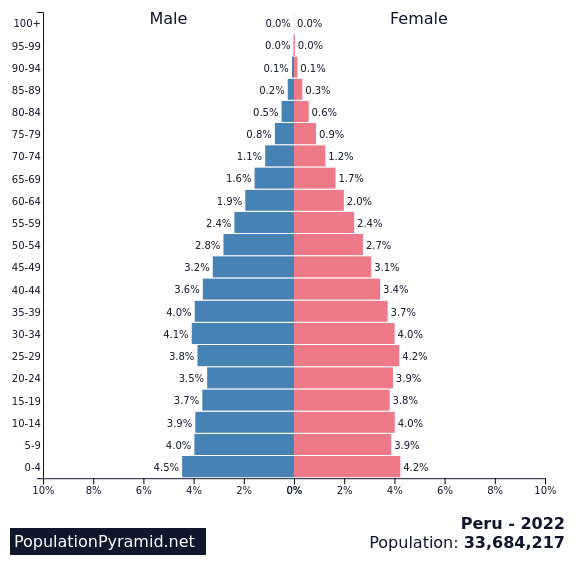
Peru population pyramid – 2022

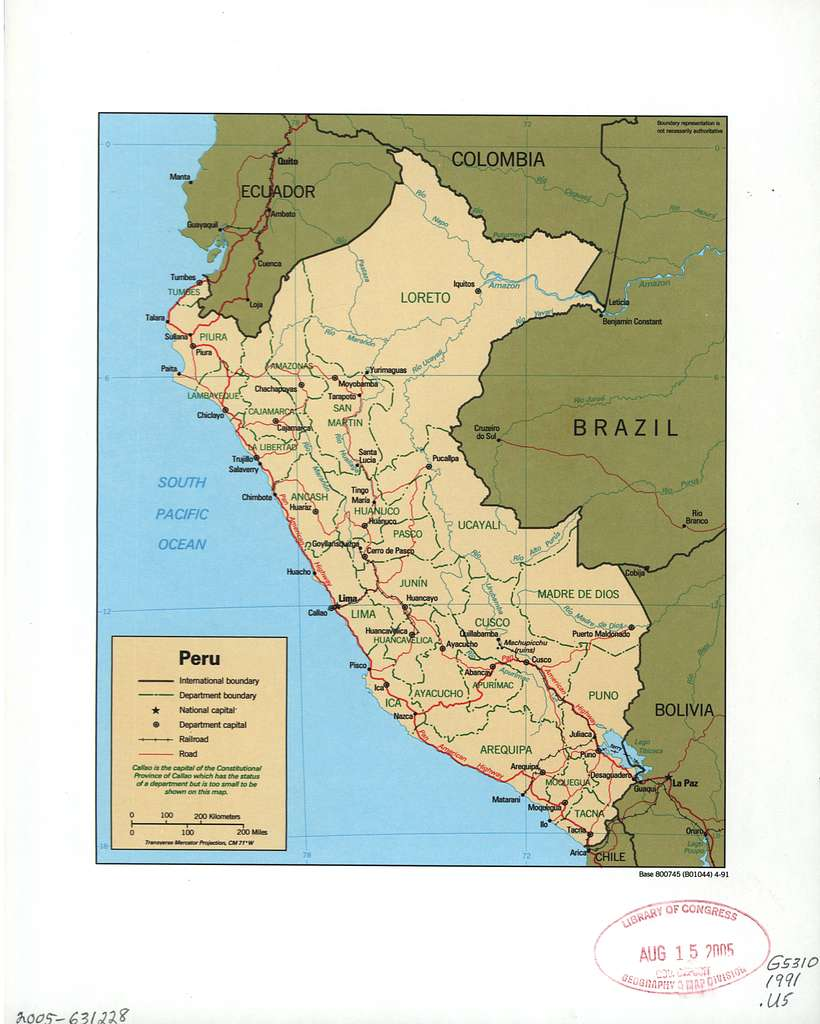
Geographic view of Peru

Year	Fertility rate	Urban population	Life expectancy	Median age	Birth rate	Death rate
1955	6.96	3,856,003	45.12	18.7	424,196	184,701
1960	6.95	4,709,872	48.01	18.2	478,088	187,821
1965	6.88	6,020,628	50.87	17.7	527,930	189,316
1970	6.55	7,658,573	54.17	17.6	569,564	184,403
1975	5.71	9,360,547	57.58	17.9	604,055	176,605
1980	5.04	11,209,453	60.24	18.5	634,193	172,392
1985	4.46	13,068,523	63.13	19.2	666,023	165,158
1990	3.91	15,038,734	66.17	20.1	677,030	155,637
1995	3.31	17,055,649	68.90	21.2	648,450	146,948
2000	2.85	18,928,687	71.11	22.7	614,914	144,610
2005	2.69	20,717,275	72.91	24.1	618,998	148,160
2010	2.55	22,450,249	74.41	25.5	598,767	153,901
2015	2.32	24,271,929	75.79	27.5	569,290	164,032
2020	2.21	26,082,479	76.95	31	574,987	185,606
2025 estimate	2.11	–	77.96	32.6	559,678	207,927
2030 estimate	2.03	–	78.98	34.2	531,271	225,685
2035 estimate	1.95	–	79.95	35.6	509,213	246,605
2040 estimate	1.89	–	80.88	36.8	493,994	270,210

Peru – Population density by region or department (2007)

Historical population
Year	Pop.	±%
10000 BCE	242,217	—
9000 BCE	290,661	+20.0%
8000 BCE	348,793	+20.0%
7000 BCE	418,551	+20.0%
6000 BCE	502,262	+20.0%
5000 BCE	602,715	+20.0%
4000 BCE	723,260	+20.0%
3000 BCE	867,911	+20.0%
2000 BCE	1,040,000	+19.8%
1000 BCE	1,250,000	+20.2%
0	1,500,000	+20.0%
500	2,040,000	+36.0%
1000	3,000,000	+47.1%
1500	4,000,000	+33.3%
1600	1,300,000	−67.5%
1700	1,500,000	+15.4%
1800	1,270,000	−15.3%
1900	3,690,000	+190.6%
1925	5,140,000	+39.3%
1950	7,777,446	+51.3%
1975	15,424,744	+98.3%
2000	26,459,944	+71.5%
2005	27,866,145	+5.3%
2010	29,027,674	+4.2%
2015	30,470,734	+5.0%
2020	32,971,854	+8.2%
2025 estimate	34,520,000	+4.7%
2040 estimate	38,550,000	+11.7%

Population by Provinces 1791–1862
Places	1791	1836	1850	1862
Chancay	13,945	18,712	23,428	30,525
Callao	–	6,790	8,352	17,539
Ica	20,576	18,031	12,920	45,697
Jauja	52,286	61,023	89,796	106,567
Huamalíes	14,234	13,172	32,027	40,114
Huaylas	40,822	49,667	69,077	39,833
Cajamarca	62,196	41,993	46,122	70,683
Piura	44,491	53,815	74,372	131,464
Chachapoyas	25,398	18,426	27,728	17,952
Carabaya	–	–	22,605	34,068
Quispicanchi	24,337	–	49,416	19,674
Paruro	20,236	–	17,732	15,926
Aymaraes	15,281	–	18,228	22,985
Cotabambas	19,824	–	23,241	27,667
Huamanga	25,970	–	29,617	44,898
Cangallo	12,474	–	20,176	34,722
Andahuaylas	12,020	–	19,184	51,701
Tayacaja	13,161	–	27,151	40,802
Arequipa	37,721	–	63,816	53,334
Moquegua	28,279	–	32,380	29,209
Tacna	18,776	–	18,642	33,815
Tarapacá	7,923	–	10,418	17,239

== Indigenous Languages ==
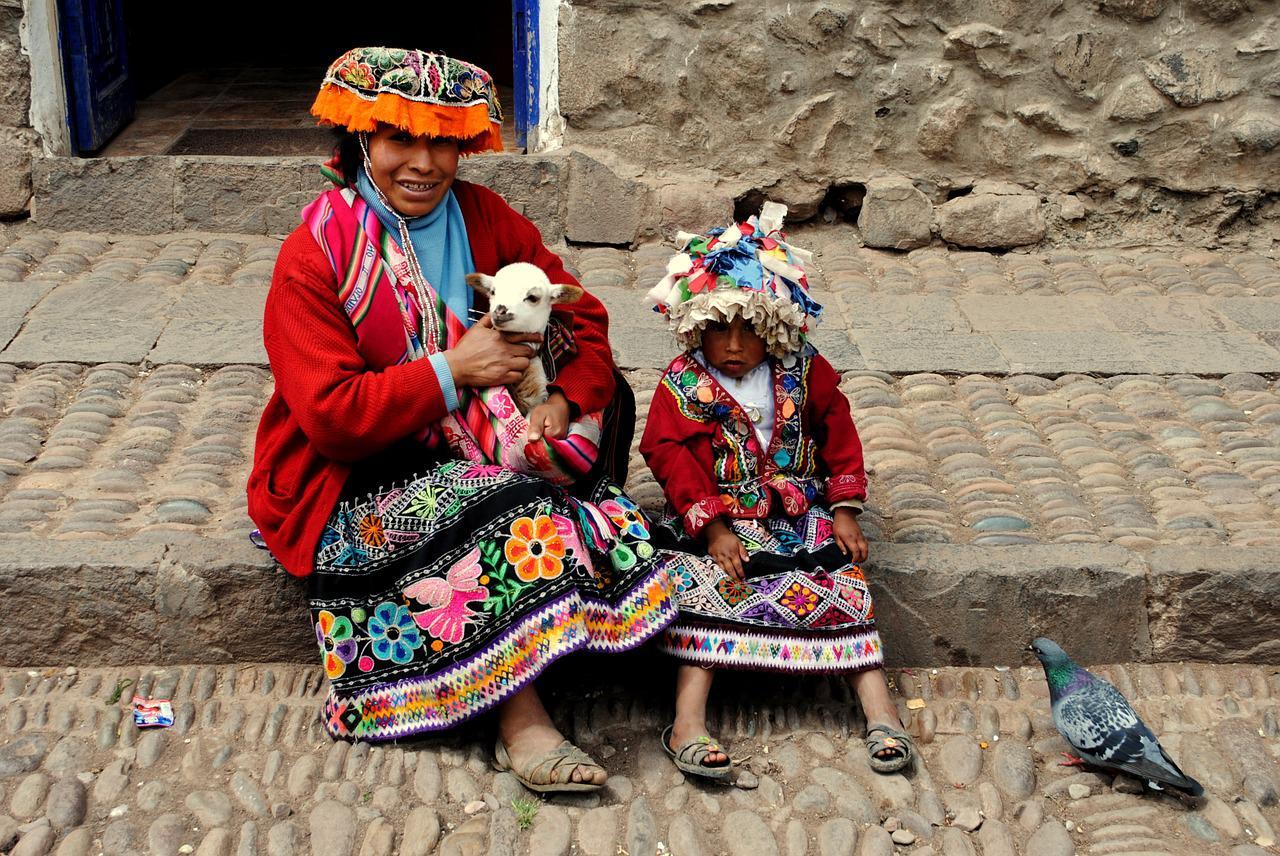
Indigenous people of Peru

People spoke different languages in South America. Inhabitants were facing an issue in socioeconomic relationships with fellow Peruvians. There was no writing communication in old Europe, making it more difficult for native speakers as the only way was linguistic communication. Until around the 1860s, indigenous languages were more commonly spoken languages, and the most popular were Aymara and Quechua which has a significant number of speakers. Spanish had spoken among largest group of people in Peru of almost 28.71 million and become the 7th most native Spanish speakers country of the world. The language split between the coastal areas, where Spanish predominates over Amerindian languages, because the diverse traditional Andean cultures of the mountains and highlands reflects Peru's distinct geographical areas. The central Andes and the Amazon rain forest are home to Peru's indigenous languages. The presence of Quechua and Aymara languages dominated in the Andean highlands. The area which connects the southern to northern American continents.

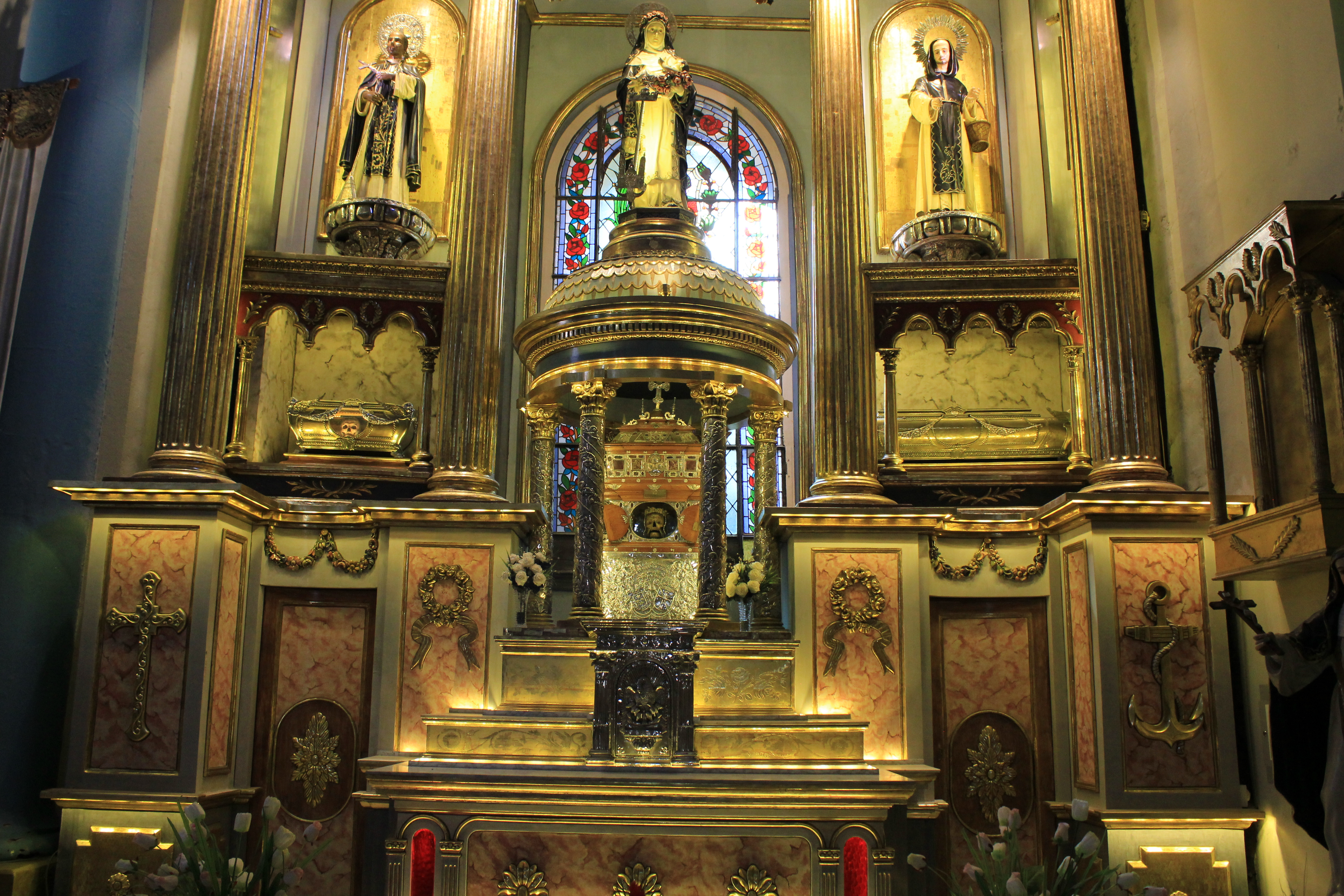
Convent of Santo Domingo, Lima

Peru is the multilingual landscape of South America with rich diversification of languages spoken. Yet Quechua was a widely spoken language in Peru. And had biggest indigenous language family in Americas. Quechua has mainly used in different countries of South America, including Bolivia, Argentina, Ecuador, Colombia, and Brazil. It is probably most recognized for being the Inca Empire's primary family language. Domingo de Santo Tomás, a Dominican and advocate of the Indian cause, wrote the first published description of a Quechuan language, including grammar and a dictionary. The Quechua language survived the Spanish invasion of the Inca in the sixteenth century. Younger generation of Quechua families adapting Spanish and their elders fear that their descendants are losing touch with their culture's values and ancestral understanding. Despite a brief comeback in the 19th century shortly after Latin American nations declared independence, Quechua's status had declined. The Quechua language continues to lose popularity and relevance in Peru, putting Quechua cultural and ancestral values in danger, this is due to the perceived economic and social benefits of speaking Spanish. Despite the fact that Quechua was the official language of the whole Inca Empire, but rapidly devalued in current Peruvian society. However, the Inca were one of many peoples in modern-day Peru that spoke a Quechua dialect.

Aymara is the third most spoken language, integrated from Inca culture, and its speakers mainly live in rural areas, especially farmers. Aymara used to be very dominant in the Inca Culture era after Quechua. Aymara is a member of the Jaqi family of languages, which also includes Jaqaru and Kawki, which are mainly spoken in Lima, the capital city of Peru. Furthermore, Quechua and Aymara have some similarities in vocabulary.

However, various languages become dominant over time or decline as the people spread through different areas. The linguistic difference between Peru's distinct physical areas is represented in a language separation between the coast and the interior, where Spanish takes precedence over Amerindian languages. Furthermore, due to urbanization, people from rural areas migrate to urban areas and adopt Spanish, becoming Peru's official language.

The most common language in Peru is Spanish, but is also home to dozens of indigenous languages, of which Quechua and Aymara are most well-known. There are so many languages and people from different cultures lived in Peru. In the country, around 72 different indigenous languages are spoken. Despite this, nearly 26% of the population speaks a language other than Spanish as their first language. In rural locations, indigenous languages are spoken at a higher rate. The majority of inhabitants in the country's metropolitan areas, particularly around the coast, are monolingual and solely speak Spanish.

Languages (mother tongue) of Peru According to Census Data
Language	1981 Census		1993 Census		2007 Census		2017 Census	
Language	Number	%	Number	%	Number	%	Number	%
Spanish	10,012,758	73.31	15,405,014	79.78	21,713,165	84.13	22,209,686	83.34
Quechua	2,917,870	21.36	3,177,937	16.46	3,360,331	13.02	3,735,682	14.02
Aymara	395,058	2.89	440,380	2.28	443,248	1.72	444,389	1.67
Other Native	79,869	0.58	132,174	0.68	174,410	0.68	210,017	0.79
Other	253,119	1.85	153,098	0.79	119,177	0.46	48,910	0.18
Total	13,658,674		19,308,603		25,810,331		26,648,684	

== Ethnic Divisions ==
Peru is one of the most populous multiethnic countries in South America, built through a combination of different civilizations and origins over a millennium. Ethnicity plays a vital role in building a society and culture of a country. People may have multi-dimensional identities or ethnicities. The primary races were Spaniards and Amerindians, who came in large numbers. Peru was completely under the rule of the Spanish colonialists from 1538 onwards, and it remained so amid protests and opposition throughout the seventeenth and eighteenth centuries. Spanish colonisation resulted in a different ethnicity in which Peru's indigenous people is by far the majority. The rich and powerful classes act themselves as radically different from other lower class indigenous people. In the 20th century, the mass migration happened of indigenous people towards rural-urban areas created an urban centre heavily diversified in ethnic, racial, and social class. European countries, including Germany, Austria, Italy, and Argentina etc., were also major migration stakeholders. More than a hundred thousand Chinese migrated as labor or enslaved people in Peru from 1840 to 1874. They were still in larger quantity in Peru, especially in urban centres including Lima where the majority lives. The downside of native population started in Peru right after the independence of South American nations. Most of the population from different parts of the world who came to Peru live in Urban areas, especially in Lima, their capital city.

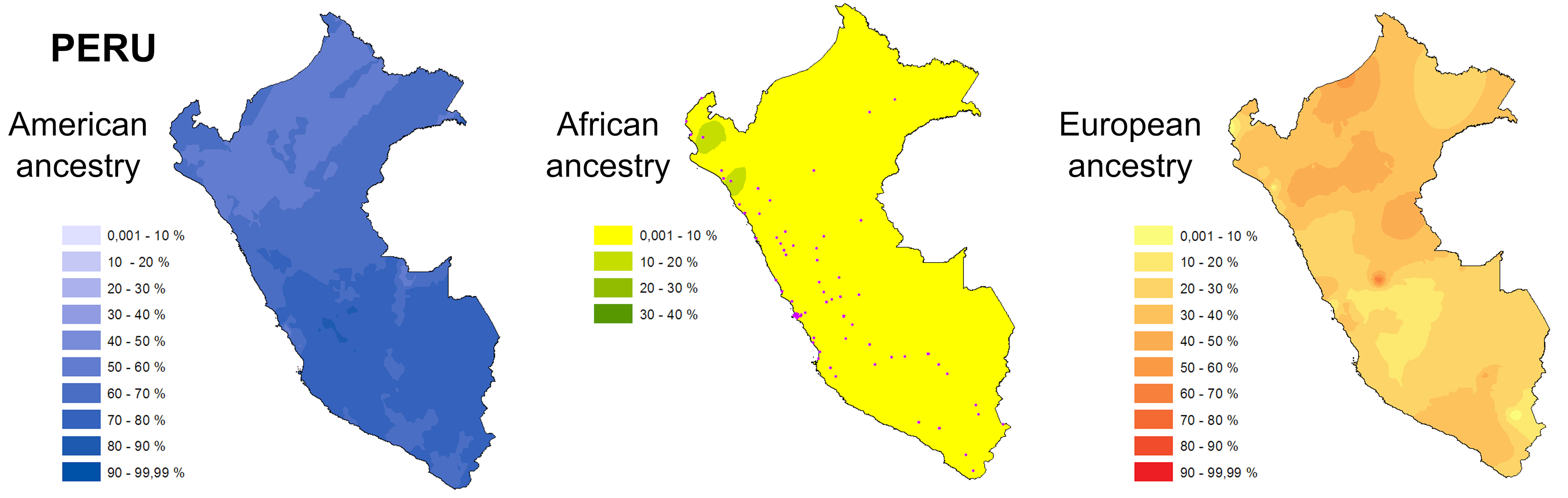
Geographic ancestry distribution of Peru

== Religions ==
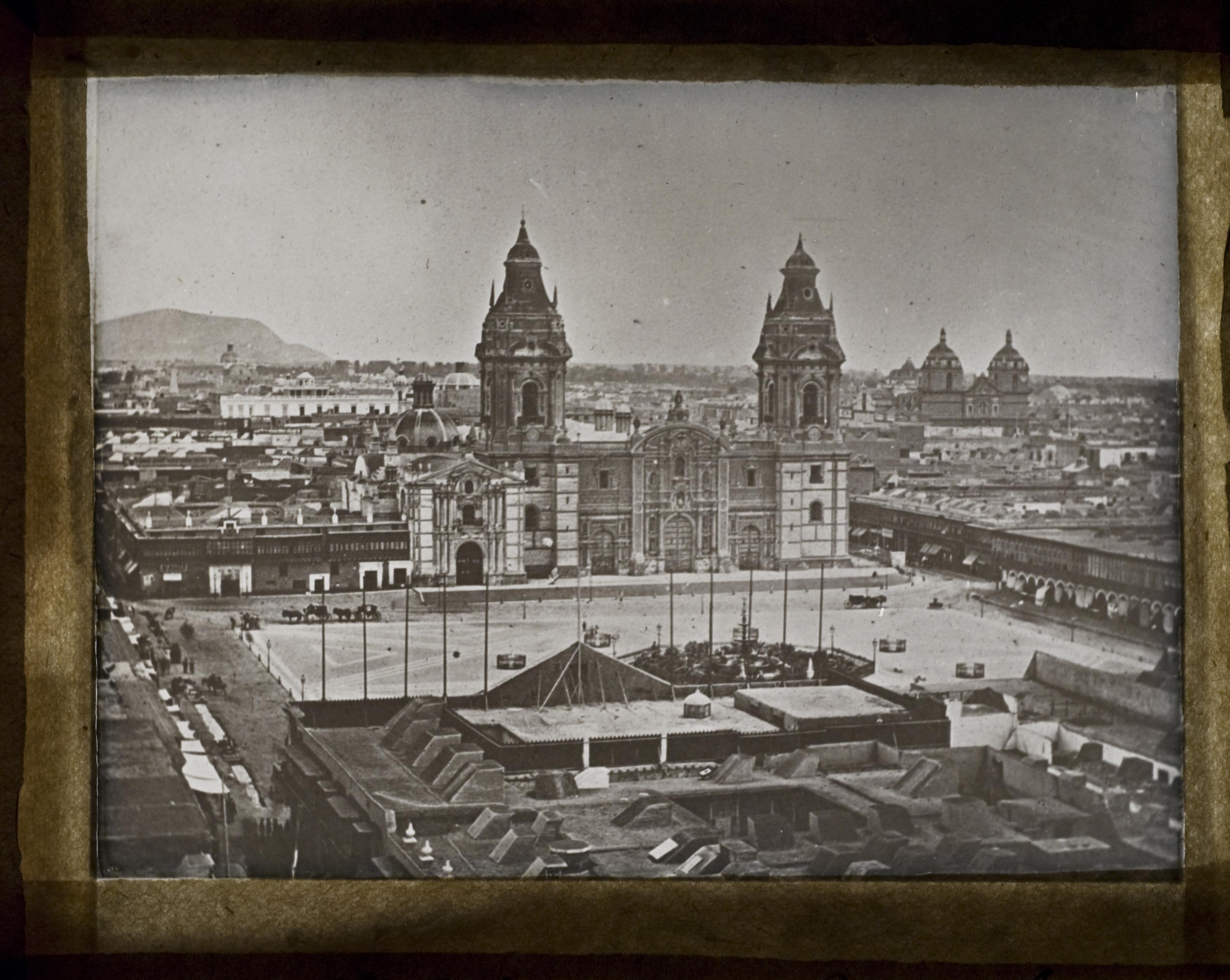
Cathedral, Lima (1870)

There are multiple religions in Peru, but Roman Catholicism is the largest, although some other faiths of Christianity are also present. The Catholic Church has much influenced on Government of Peru, and also constitution accepted the supremacy of the Church. Alberto Fujimori was elected president of Peru in 1990 after a movement against the country's corrupt and powerful political structure. His parents were Buddhists, but he was raised as Roman Catholic. The Catholic Church in Peru has unique status because of an agreement signed with the Vatican in 1980. Peru is an independent, social republic, democratic and sovereign, under the constitution of 1993. The Catholic Church's role in the nation's historical, cultural, and moral development is recognised in Article 50 of the Constitution. Because of the strong commitment of the people and state toward the Church, therefore Church influenced and penetrated the administration, culture, and social issues of Peru. Furthermore, the expansion of Spaniards in Peru led Catholicism to spread everywhere and became the largest followed religion. Peruvians' beliefs are still heavily influenced by indigenous religious traditions. Moreover, the religion had absorbed Inca cultural traditions, indigenous people's beliefs, and practices. However, there are other religious groups in the minority. Catholics are 76% of the total population, while 14% are Protestant, 5.1% irreligious, and 4.9% others, including Muslims, Jews, Orthodox, Buddhists, and other small religious groups. The more significant part of small religious groups resides in Lima.

The predominant religion of Peru is Roman catholic. Indigenous Peruvians, however, have blended Catholicism and their traditional beliefs.

Religions of Peru According to Census Data
Religion	1981 Census		1993 Census		2007 Census		2017 Census	
Religion	Number	%	Number	%	Number	%	Number	%
Catholic	14,198,653	89.25	13,786,001	89.24	16,956,722	81.33	17,635,339	76.03
Evangelical	1,680,341	10.56	1,042,888	6.75	2,606,055	12.50	3,264,819	14.07
Other / Not Specified	1,680,341	10.56	397,825	2.58	679,291	3.26	1,115,872	4.81
Atheist / Agnostic	29,513	0.19	222,141	1.44	608,434	2.92	1,180,361	5.09
Total	15,908,507		15,448,855		20,850,502		23,196,391	
