= Cockade of Peru =

Cockade (escarapela) of Peru.

The cockade of Peru is a national embleml of the Peruvian nation. 1825 law decreed its characteristics, with the same colors as the national flag: red-white-red. Officially recognized as a national emblem in 2025. It is often worn as a badge on the chest during Independence Day parades and other events of the day.
