= Courts of First Instance of Peru =

Third level court

The Courts of First Instance are the third hierarchic level organized in the judiciary of Peru.

Each province has a Court of First Instance. Courts of First Instance are subdivided according to their specialty.

The specialties that the courts are divided into are the following;

- Civil: has jurisdiction over topics relating to Civil Rights with the exception of Family law
- Criminal: has jurisdiction over all topics relating to Criminal law
- Labor: has jurisdiction over all topics relating to Labor law
- Family: has jurisdiction over all topics relating to Family law
- Commercial: has jurisdiction over all topics relating to Commercial law

Courts that receive cases from more than one of these categories are called Mixed Courts. Trials that originate in Courts of Peace, can be re-tried in these courts. Likewise, trials originating in these courts may be re-tried in Superior Courts.

== See also ==
- Judicial System of Peru
- Judicial Districts of Peru
- Provinces of Peru
