= Courts of Peace of Peru =

Lowest hierarchic level in the judicial system of Peru

The Courts of Peace are the lowest hierarchic level in the judicial system of Peru.

Each district in the country has a Court of Peace. Courts of Peace have jurisdiction over minor cases and cannot try criminals. They are not divided into specialties.

Courts of Peace are divided into two types:

- Licensed Courts of Peace, known simply as Courts of Peace, in which the judge is official and is officially licensed.
- Unlicensed Courts of Peace, in which the judge is a citizen elected by the public. In addition to national law, the judge may decide based on justice and equality. These courts only exist in extremely rural areas where access to licensed judges is not possible. A licensed judge always has authority over an unlicensed citizen-judge.

Cases originating in Courts of Peace can be re-tried in a Court of First Instance.

== See also ==
- Judiciary of Peru
- Judicial Districts of Peru
- Courts of First Instance of Peru
