= Judicial districts of Peru =

Area where a particular court has jurisdiction

In Peru, a judicial district (Spanish: Partido judicial) is a territorial unit for the administration of justice, composed of a number of districts within the same province. They are subdivisions of the Judicial System of Peru, with 34 in total. Judicial Districts in Peru:

== List ==
N°	Name	Headquarters	Established		Jurisdiction
N°	Name	Headquarters	Date	Law	Jurisdiction
1	Amazonas	Chachapoyas	August 20, 1942	Law Nº 9397	Amazonas Region
2	Ancash	Huaraz	February 14, 1863		entire Ancash Region excluding the provinces of Santa, Casma, Huarmey, Corongo and Pallasca. It has also jurisdiction over the Marañón Province of Huanuco region.
3	Apurímac	Abancay	September 7, 1936	Law Nº 8242	Apurímac Region with exception of the Cotabambas Province.
4	Arequipa	Arequipa	July 27, 1825		Arequipa Region and the General Sánchez Cerro Province of the Moquegua Region.
5	Ayacucho	Ayacucho	March 21, 1844	Law Nº 8569	Ayacucho Region with the exception of the Cangallo, Lucanas, Parinacochas, and Paucar del Sara Sara provinces. It also has jurisdiction over the Churcampa Province of the Huancavelica Region.
6	Cajamarca	Cajamarca	January 28, 1862		Cajamarca Region with the exception of the provinces of Jaen, San Ignacio, and Cutervo. It also has jurisdiction over the Bolivar Province of La Libertad Region.
7	Callao	Callao	April 21, 1961	Law Nº 13212	Callao Region which is synonymous to the city of Callao, except Ventanilla a Mi Perú districts
8	Cañete	Cañete	December 4, 1993	Law Nº 25680	The provinces of Cañete and Yauyos of the Lima Region.
9	Cusco	Cusco	February 1, 1825		Cusco Region and the Cotabambas Province of the Apurímac Region
10	Huancavelica	Huancavelica	R1C3		Huancavelica Region excluding the provinces of Churcampa, Huaytará, and Tayacaja.
11	Huánuco	Huánuco	April 30, 1936	Law Nº 8166	Huánuco Region, with the exception of the Marañón Province and the Puerto Inca Province
12	Huaura	Huacho	November 10, 1993	Law Nº 25689	provinces of Barranca, Cajatambo, Huaura, Huaral, and Oyón of the Lima Region.
13	Ica	Ica	March 17, 1937	Law Nº 8452	Ica Region and including Huaytará Province of the Huancavelica Region, and the Lucanas, Parinacochas, and Paucar del Sara Sara provinces of the Ayacucho Region.
14	Junín	Huancayo	May 15, 1920		Junín Region (except Chanchamayo and Satipo Provinces), and the Tayacaja Province of the Huancavelica Region. Judicial Power of Peru.
15	La Libertad	Trujillo	April 30, 1824		La Libertad Region excluding the Bolívar Province
16	Lambayeque	Chiclayo	May 4, 1920	Law Nº 4049	entire Lambayeque Region. Its jurisdiction also includes the Jaén, San Ignacio, and Cutervo provinces of the Cajamarca Region
17	Lima	Lima	December 22, 1824		35 of the 43 Districts of Lima
18	Lima Este				The section of the Lima Metropolitan Area called the Cono Este, and Huarochirí province.
19	Lima Norte	Independencia	May 26, 1993	Law Nº 25680	The section of the Lima Metropolitan Area called the Cono Norte, and Canta province.
20	Lima Sur				The section of the Lima Metropolitan Area called the Cono Sur.
21	Loreto	Iquitos	April 21, 1907	Law Nº 230	Loreto Region excluding the Alto Amazonas Province
22	Madre de Dios	Puerto Maldonado	Administrative Resolution Nº 065-2001-CE-PJ	July 2, 2001	Madre de Dios Region
23	Moquegua	Moquegua	April 15, 2004	Law Nº 15805	Moquegua Region excluding the General Sánchez Cerro Province which falls under the jurisdiction of the Judicial District of Arequipa
24	Pasco				It has jurisdiction over the provinces of Pasco Region, excluding Oxapampa Province.
25	Piura	Piura	February 26, 1876		Piura Region, excluding Ayabaca, Sullana and Talara provinces.
26	Puno	Puno	July 28, 1850	Law Nº 138	Puno Region
27	San Martín	Moyobamba	May 2, 1942	Law Nº 9362	San Martín Region and the Alto Amazonas Province of Loreto Region
28	Santa	Chimbote	June 30, 1997	Administrative Resolution Nº 376-CME-PJ	Santa, Casma, Corongo, Pallasca, and Huarmey of the Ancash Region
29	Selva Central	La Merced			Chanchamayo and Satipo provinces of Junin Region and the Oxapampa province of Pasco Region.
30	Sullana	Sullana			Ayabaca, Sullana and Talara provinces of Piura Region.
31	Tumbes	Tumbes	May 3, 2001	Administrative Resolution Nº 035-2001	Tumbes Region
32	Tacna	Tacna	June 13, 1857		Tacna Region
33	Ucayali	Pucallpa	April 17, 1993	Law Nº 25147	Ucayali Region and the Puerto Inca Province of the Huánuco Region
34	Ventanilla				Ventanilla and Mi Perú districts of Callao region and Santa Rosa and Ancon districts of Lima province.

== See also ==
- Judicial System of Peru
- Administrative divisions of Peru
- Superior Courts of Peru
