= Superior Courts of Justice of Peru =

Second highest courts in Peru

The Superior Courts of Justice or Superior Sectors of Peru are the second highest courts of the Judicial system of Peru. It is only second to the Supreme Court of Peru. There is one court for each Judicial District which more or less correspond with each of the 25 regions of Peru. A Superior Court is subdivided into smaller courts according to its speciality:

- Civil Courts: have jurisdiction over all topics relating to Civil Rights excluding Family Law
- Criminal Courts: have jurisdiction over crimes and other topics relating to Criminal law.
- Labor Courts: have jurisdiction over topics relating to Labor law
- Family Courts: have jurisdiction over topics relating to Family law
- Commercial Courts: have jurisdiction over topics relating to Commercial law

In the past, the Judicial District of Lima had an Administrative Contentious Court. This court disappeared because of administrative reasons, but is maintained open until its current cases are resolved.

Courts that receive cases from more than one speciality are called Mixed Court. In a Superior Court, when there is no determined court for a case, and there are no Mixed Courts in the Superior Court as well, the case falls under the jurisdiction of a Civil Court, with the exception of criminal cases which must be tried in a Criminal Court.

Few cases originate in Superior Courts, so for this reason the act mostly as Courts of Appeals. Under Peruvian law, a double instance only exists in the case that a case ascends to the Supreme Court. Those cases receive a double instance in a Superior Court according to the Abrogation doctrine.

== Organization and function ==
Each Court is made up of five justices, one of them being the President of the Court. The president of the entire Superior Court is elected between the presidents of each individual Court. Each Superior Court has a different number of Courts.

For a court to make a decision, four of the five votes must be necessary. If the four votes are not obtained, and act which is called a discord occurs in which a member of another court (in the same Superior Court), gets a sixth vote. If including the sixth vote, the decision does not obtain six votes, a seventh vote from a member of another court is given which is when the resolution must be passed.

== See also ==
- Judiciary of Peru
- Judicial districts of Peru
