= David Waisman =

Peruvian politician (born 1937)

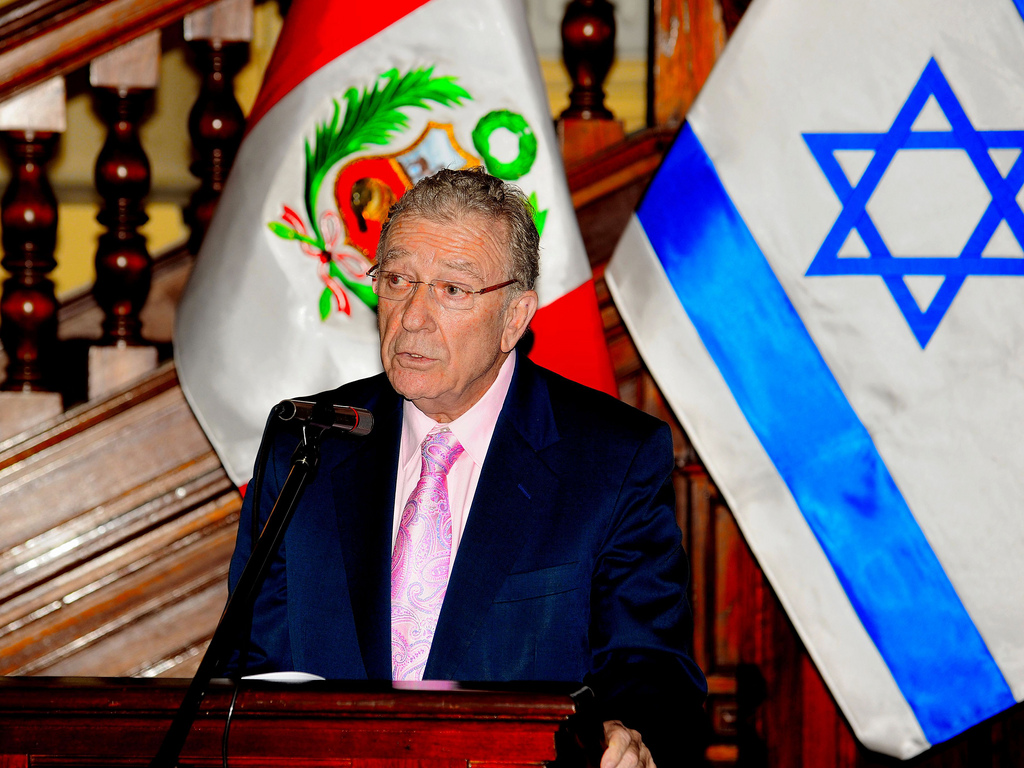
- Waisman in 2011

Second Vice President of Peru
- In office 28 July 2001 – 28 July 2006
- President: Alejandro Toledo
- Preceded by: Ricardo Márquez Flores (2000)
- Succeeded by: Lourdes Mendoza

Minister of Defense
- In office 28 July 2001 – 18 January 2002
- President: Alejandro Toledo
- Prime Minister: Roberto Dañino
- Preceded by: Walter Rebaza
- Succeeded by: Aurelio Loret de Mola

Member of Congress
- In office 26 July 2001 – 26 July 2011
- Constituency: Lima
- In office 26 July 2000 – 26 July 2001
- Constituency: National

Personal details
- Born: David Waisman Rjavinsthi; 4 May 1937 (age 89) Lambayeque, Peru
- Party: Independent (2017–present)
- Other political affiliations: National Solidarity (2010–2017); Possible Peru (1999–2010)
- Spouse: Giovanna Molina Cabezas
- Children: 3

David Waisman Rjavinsthi (born 4 May 1937) is a Peruvian politician who served as the Second Vice President of Peru from 2001 to 2006. He also served as Congressman from 2000 to 2011.

== Early life ==
Son of Natan Waisman Reines and Blima Rjavinsthi Tubac, who came to Peru as young people fleeing antisemitic policies that were developing in Europe. He studied primary education at the José Granda school and the first years of secondary school at the Hipólito Unanue school; however, he did not finish school.

== Political career ==
He is a member of Possible Peru since 1994, and was elected as a Congressman in the 2000, 2001, and 2006 elections, representing Lima. In the 2000 elections, Waisman ran as the second running mate of Alejandro Toledo, but the ticket was defeated by the ticket of Alberto Fujimori in the runoff in which, Toledo withdrew.

In 2000-01 Waisman led a Peruvian congressional investigation commission that investigated corruption and a range of illegal activities.

=== Second Vice President ===
On 28 July 2001, Waisman became Second Vice President of Peru in Alejandro Toledo's government, and served as such from 2001 to 2006. When Raúl Diez Canseco resigned as First Vice President in 2004 after a scandal with his girlfriend, Waisman became the only Vice President of Peru until 2006. He was also Defense Minister during Toledo's presidency. He attained these positions in government in spite of the fact that he does not have any post-secondary studies and did not finish secondary school. He later resigned as Defense Minister in 2002.

=== 2006 elections ===
In 2006, he was initially appointed by Possible Perú as a presidential candidate but independent Jeanette Emmanuel later replaced him as Possible Perú's candidate. With her withdrawal, Rafael Belaúnde was appointed the new candidate, but he also withdrew. He instead ran for Congress, and was successfully re-elected as one of the only 2 congressmen from Possible Perú, aside from Carlos Bruce.

=== 2011 elections ===
He considered running for Vice President once more in the early 2011 elections alongside Luis Castañeda, after having switched from Possible Perú due to irreconcilable differences with Toledo, to Partido Solidaridad Nacional. He lost his Congressional seat consequently.

== Link ==
- David Waisman website
- Congress of Peru site
