= Roberto Angulo =

Peruvian politician

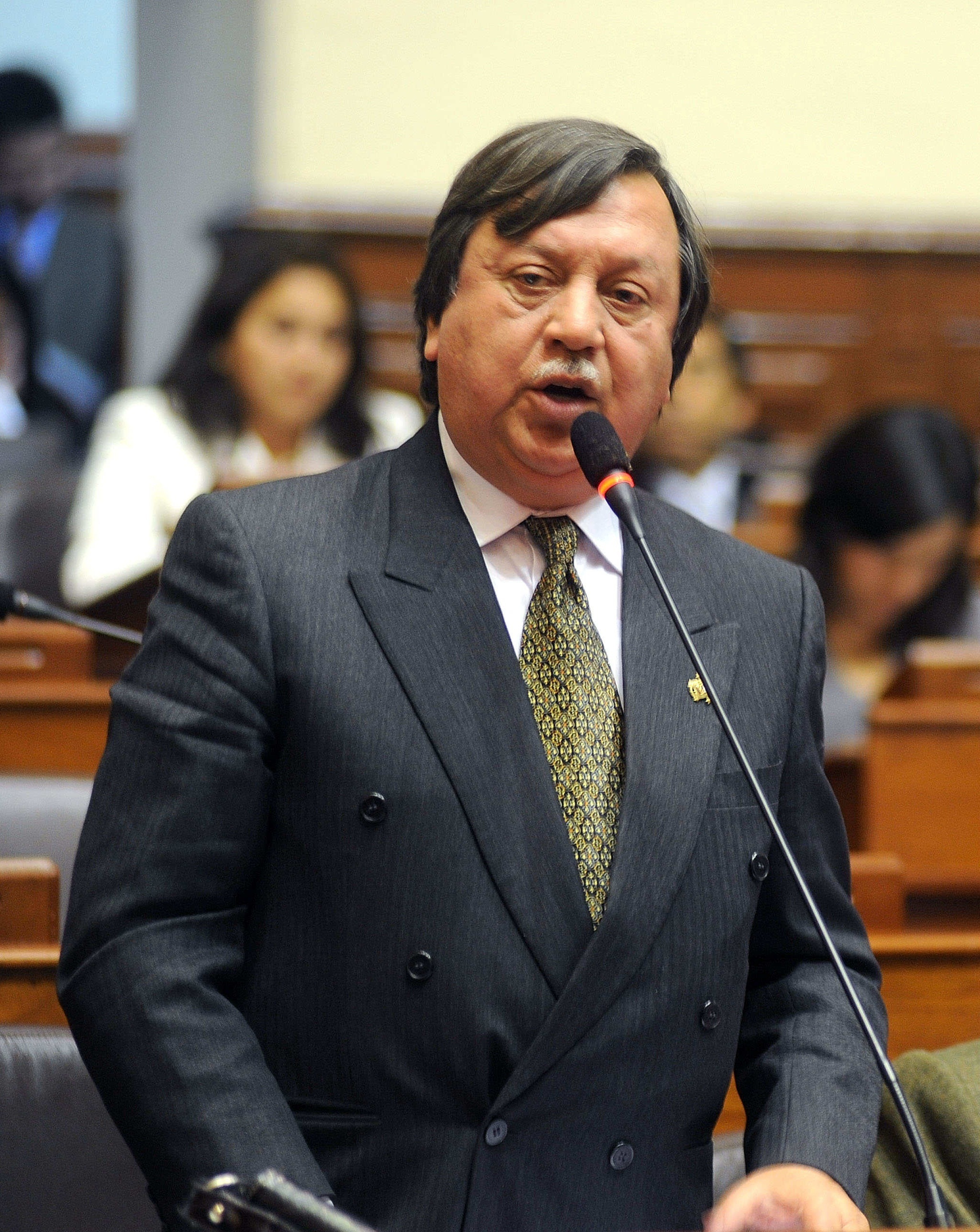

Member of Congress
- In office July 26, 2011 – July 26, 2016
- Constituency: La Libertad

Personal details
- Born: Roberto Angulo Álvarez; 29 August 1951 (age 74) Trujillo, Peru
- Party: Direct Democracy
- Other political affiliations: Peruvian Nationalist Party (2005- 2016); Possible Peru (2016); Together for Peru (2018)
- Occupation: Politician

Roberto Angulo Álvarez (born 29 August 1951) is a Peruvian politician. In 2011, he was elected as a congressman for La Libertad for the period 2011–2016 by the Peruvian Nationalist Party.

== Biography ==
He completed pre-university studies in the city of Trujillo, having attended classes at the Antonio Raymondi School, the Great José Faustino Sánchez Carrión de Trujillo School Unit, completing his secondary studies at the Gran Mariscal Ramón Castilla Military School. He studied economics engineering at the National University of Engineering. He has been president of the Regional Chamber of Tourism of La Libertad. From 2005 to 2015, he is a partisan affiliated with the Peruvian Nationalist Party and, since 2020, the Direct Democracy party.

He participated in the 2011 general elections as a candidate for Congressman for La Libertad for the Gana Peru alliance and was elected. He unsuccessfully attempted reelection in the 2016 general elections as the candidate of Peru Possible. Likewise, he participated in the 2018 regional elections as a candidate for regional governor of La Libertad for Together for Peru, obtaining only 1,048% of the votes.

During his tenure, he was the author of Bill No. 142, which was approved by Congress in 2012. This law prohibits universities, technological institutes, graduate schools and other institutions of higher education from conditioning students to pay their pensions so that they can attend classes, be evaluated, or receive attention to their claims.
