= Manuel Zerillo =

Peruvian politician

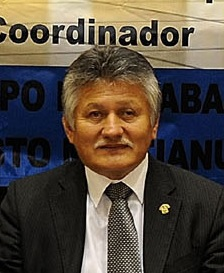

Member of Congress
- In office 26 July 2011 – 26 July 2016
- Constituency: Lima Region

Personal details
- Born: Manuel Salvador Zerillo Bazalar; 28 December 1951 (age 74) Huacho, Peru
- Party: Peruvian Nationalist Party
- Occupation: Politician
- Profession: Industrial engineer

Manuel Salvador Zerillo Bazalar (born 28 December 1951) is a Peruvian industrial engineer and politician. He was a former Congressman for the Lima Region during the parliamentary period 2011-2016 elected under the Peru Wins alliance. During his time in Congress, he participated in the formulation of 279 bills, of which 42 were approved as laws of the republic.

== Biography ==
He was born in Huacho, Peru, on 28 December 1951. He studied primary and secondary school in his hometown and between 1971 and 1978 he studied industrial engineering at the José Faustino Sánchez Carrión de Huacho National University.

In the 2011 general elections, he was elected Congressman under the Peru Wins alliance. During his time in Congress, he participated in the formulation of 279 bills, of which 42 were approved as laws of the republic.

== Controversies ==
In 2011, as a result of several journalistic publications, it was made public that the company "Pesquera Z y T S.A.C." owned by Zerillo Bazalar maintained debts for fines before the Ministry of Production for 20 million soles.
