= Omar Chehade =

Peruvian lawyer and politician, Second Vice President of Peru from 2011 to 2012

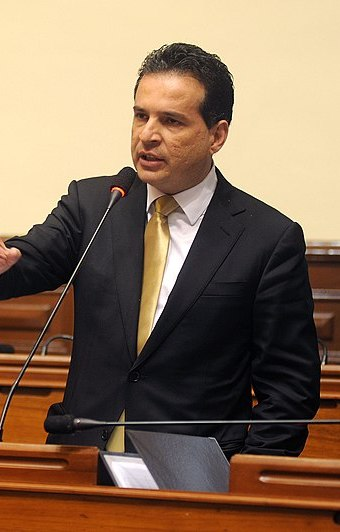
- Chehade in December 2011

Member of Congress
- In office 16 March 2020 – 26 July 2021
- Constituency: Lima
- In office 26 July 2011 – 26 July 2016
- Constituency: Lima

Second Vice President of Peru
- In office 28 July 2011 – 31 January 2012
- President: Ollanta Humala
- Preceded by: Lourdes Mendoza del Solar
- Succeeded by: Mercedes Aráoz (2016)

Personal details
- Born: Omar Karim Chehade Moya; 8 November 1970 (age 55) Lima, Peru
- Party: Alliance for Progress (2019–present)
- Other political affiliations: Independent (2015–2019); Peruvian Nationalist Party (2006–2015); Democratic Force (2005–2006)
- Spouse: Úrsula Galdos
- Education: Inca Garcilaso de la Vega University
- Profession: Politician, Lawyer

Omar Karim Chehade Moya (Spanish pronunciation: [oˌmaɾ kaˌɾim t͡ʃeˌxade ˈmoʝa]; born 8 November 1970) is a Peruvian lawyer and politician. He worked as consultant lawyer in the Ad Hoc Anti-corruption Prosecution in judicial cases against former president Alberto Fujimori and his intelligence chief Vladimiro Montesinos. He was the Second Vice President of Peru in Ollanta Humala's presidency from 2011 until his resignation in 2012.

== Early life and education ==
After graduating from the Marcelino Champagnat School, he studied law and political science at the University Inca Garcilaso de la Vega in Lima, from 1989 to 1995. His bachelor thesis was about reforms of the offense of murder in the Peruvian Penal Code. From 2003 to 2005, he worked as a legal adviser, adjunct to the rectorate of the National University of San Marcos.

== Law career ==
From 2005 to 2008, he was a counsel of the Ad Hoc Anti-corruption Prosecution, heading the extraditions unit in the cases against former president Alberto Fujimori and the former head of intelligence service Vladimiro Montesinos. He was ultimately successful in achieving the extradition of Fujimori from Chile, who was eventually sentenced to 25 years in prison for human rights violations, in 2009. Since 2008, Chehade is a partner of the Omar Chehade & Torres la Torre Law firm in Lima.

== Political career ==
From 2004 to 2007, Omar Chehade was affiliated to the minor Fuerza Democrática party. In the 2011 presidential elections, he was Ollanta Humala's running mate for Second Vice President. After Humala won the election over Keiko Fujimori with 51.5% of the votes in the second round, Omar Chehade took office as Second Vice President on 28 July 2011. Additionally, he was elected Congressman on Humala's Nationalist-dominated Peru Wins list, representing the city of Lima for the 2011–2016 term.

During his term as Congressman, he was President of the Constitution and Regulation Commission (2013-2014) and member of the Ordinary Commissions of Justice and Human Rights, Decentralization, Economy, Defense, Foreign Relations and Foreign Trade and Tourism.

On 5 December 2011, the Congress suspended Chehade as vice president for 120 days. This was justified with allegations that Chehade had tried to use his power for helping an agricultural company in acquiring the Andahuasi sugar plantation. He resigned as Second Vice President on 16 January 2012, following to the Andahuasi Scandal, although he continued serving in Congress until the end of his term in 2016. The following day, Congress acquitted him of alleged illegal acts with a controversial vote that was differentiated by one vote for his impeachment as a congressman.

As a result of the vote, two days later, Congress decided that the investigation of the Chehade case should go to the National Prosecutor's Office, submitting an official letter with the case file to the Public Ministry.

In 2020, Chehade ran for Congress in the snap election following the dissolution of Congress on September 30, 2019, representing Lima with the Alliance for Progress party and was elected. He currently presides the Constitution Committee.

In September 2020, in the first presidential impeachment process against Martín Vizcarra, Chehade supported the vacancy in his parliamentary speech; however, he did not endorse it during the vote.

During the second presidential vacancy process against Martín Vizcarra, Chehade voted in favor of the declaration of moral incapacity for Martín Vizcarra. The vacancy was approved by 105 MPs on November 9, 2020.
