= Opinion polling for the 2011 Peruvian general election =

Opinion polling for the Peruvian General election, 2011

Opinion polling was carried out prior to the 2011 Peruvian general election.

== President ==
=== First round ===
Date	Source	Keiko Fujimori	Alejandro Toledo	Ollanta Humala	Pedro Pablo Kuczynski	Luis Castañeda
January 2010	Ipsos Apoyo	18%	9%	15%	3%	23%
February 2010	Ipsos Apoyo	21%	9%	13%	-	22%
March 2010	Ipsos Apoyo	20%	11%	12%	-	20%
April 2010	Ipsos Apoyo	18%	12%	14%	2%	22%
May 2010	Ipsos Apoyo	18%	13%	13%	2%	22%
June 2010	Ipsos Apoyo	22%	12%	13%	2%	21%
July 2010	Ipsos Apoyo	22%	14%	12%	2%	20%
August 2010	Ipsos Apoyo	20%	14%	12%	2%	20%
August 2010	Datum	20%	14%	12%	-	19%
August 2010	Imasen	19.7%	12.1%	13.6%	1.7%	20.2%
September 2010	CPI	19.6%	14.6%	9.8%	1.2%	23.1%
September 2010	Datum	23%	14%	12%	2%	21%
September 2010	Ipsos Apoyo	24%	16%	14%	2%	19%
September 2010	IMA	25.2%	19.3%	11.8%	-	20.1%
October 2010	Datum	24%	16%	11%	1%	26%
October 2010	Ipsos Apoyo	23%	16%	11%	2%	24%
November 2010	CPI	19.6%	20.5%	8%	1.2%	24.1%
November 2010	Ipsos Apoyo	20%	20%	10%	3%	24%
December 2010	IOP	22%	22%	9%	1%	25%
December 2010	Datum	22%	26%	10%	2%	21%
December 2010	IMA	22.8%	28.6%	9.1%	-	21%
December 2010	CPI	19.3%	22%	9.8%	3.3%	24.6%
December 2010	Ipsos Apoyo	20%	23%	11%	5%	23%
December 2010	IMA	17.4%	27.3%	10.1%	5.8%	22.8%
January 2011	Datum	20%	27%	10%	4%	22%
January 2011	CPI	18.8%	25.2%	11.7%	5%	22.2%
January 2011	Ipsos Apoyo	22%	27%	10%	5%	19%
January 2011	Imasen	20.3%	30.7%	12.1%	5%	21.3%
February 2011	IOP	20.3%	28.6%	12%	3.6%	17.5%
February 2011	Datum	20%	30%	10%	5%	19%
February 2011	CPI	17.6%	30.2%	10.4%	4.3%	20.2%
February 2011	Ipsos Apoyo	22%	28%	12%	6%	18%
February 2011	IMA	20.7%	36.5%	11%	4.4%	19.9%
February 2011	Datum	19%	28%	11%	5%	19%
February 2011	Ipsos Apoyo	21%	28%	14%	6%	17%
February 2011	CPI	18.8%	28.4%	13.4%	6.4%	20.1%
March 2011	Datum	18%	29%	13%	7%	18%
March 2011	Imasen	19.2%	30%	14.1%	6.4%	19.6%
March 2011	IOP	19.3%	26.6%	15.5%	10.6%	17.3%
14 March 2011	Ipsos Apoyo	19%	26%	15%	9%	17%
21 March 2011	Ipsos Apoyo	19%	23%	17%	14%	14%
20 March 2011	Datum	17%	20.2%	18.5%	12.7%	15.5%
21 March 2011	CPI	20%	20.5%	15.7%	14.9%	17%
25 March 2011	Datum	16.1%	19.4%	17.6%	17.5%	15.5%
27 March 2011	CPI	19%	18.6%	21.2%	16.1%	15.5%
27 March 2011	Ipsos Apoyo	22.3%	21.6%	22.8%	15.8%	15%
31 March 2011	Imasen	17.6%	23.9%	21.9%	16.9%	13.8%
1 April 2011	Datum	16.4%	17.4%	21.4%	17.5%	12.6%
3 April 2011	Ipsos Apoyo	20.5%	18.5%	27.2%	18.1%	12.8%
3 April 2011	CPI	19.1%	19.6%	28.7%	17.8%	14.0%
3 April 2011	Imasen	18.2%	20%	25%	16.5%	11.6%
7 April 2011	CPI	21.5%	15%	29%	19.3%	
7 April 2011	Ipsos Apoyo	21.4%	18.2%	28%	18.4%	
8 April 2011	Datum	22.3%	15.3%	31.9%	17.3%	

There has been a lot of discussion about these polls. For instance, for a while the JNE enforced new regulations where people were obliged to give personal information. After protests by poll organisations and the people of Peru, these regulations were nullified since they were seen as an invasion of the privacy by the poll takers. According to the JNE it is not permitted to publish new polls one week before the day of election.

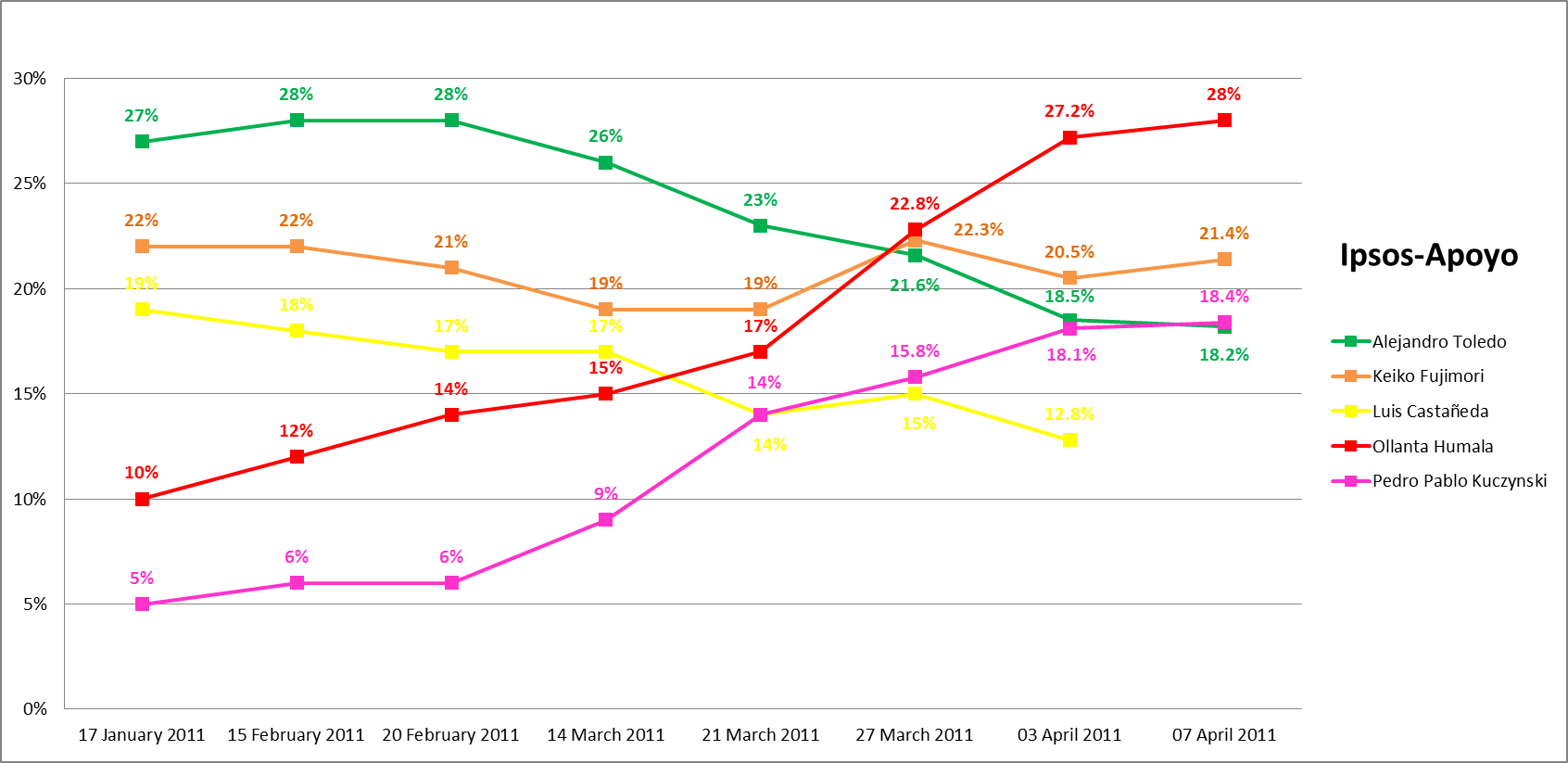

=== Second round ===
Date	Source	Ollanta Humala	Keiko Fujimori
24 April 2011	Ipsos Apoyo	42%	36%
28 April 2011	CPI	40.6%	36.8%
29 April 2011	Datum	41.5%	40.3%
4 May 2011	Ipsos Apoyo	39%	38%
7 May 2011	IOP – PUCP	40.7%	40.5%
8 May 2011	Ipsos Apoyo	39%	41%
12 May 2011	Datum	37.9%	40.6%
15 May 2011	CPI	47.1%	52.9%
15 May 2011	Ipsos Apoyo	48.9%	51.1%
15 May 2011	Datum	40.2%	46%
19 May 2011	Datum	41.8%	45.4%
22 May 2011	Ipsos Apoyo	39%	43%
22 May 2011	CPI	46.3%	53.7%
26 May 2011	Datum	47.1%	52.9%
27 May 2011	IOP – PUCP	42.3%	42.8%
29 May 2011	Ipsos Apoyo	49.5%	50.5%
29 May 2011	CPI	48.2%	51.8%
29 May 2011	Datum	47.7%	52.3%
1 June 2011	Datum	49.4%	50.6%
1 June 2011	Ipsos Apoyo	48.9%	51.1%
2 June 2011	CPI	50.5%	49.5%
2 June 2011	IOP – PUCP	51.8%	48.2%
3 June 2011	Datum	50.8%	49.2%
4 June 2011	Ipsos Apoyo	51.9%	48.1%
5 June 2011	Ipsos Apoyo	52.7%	47.3%
