= Possible Peru Electoral Alliance =

Possible Peru Electoral Alliance Alianza Electoral Perú Posible
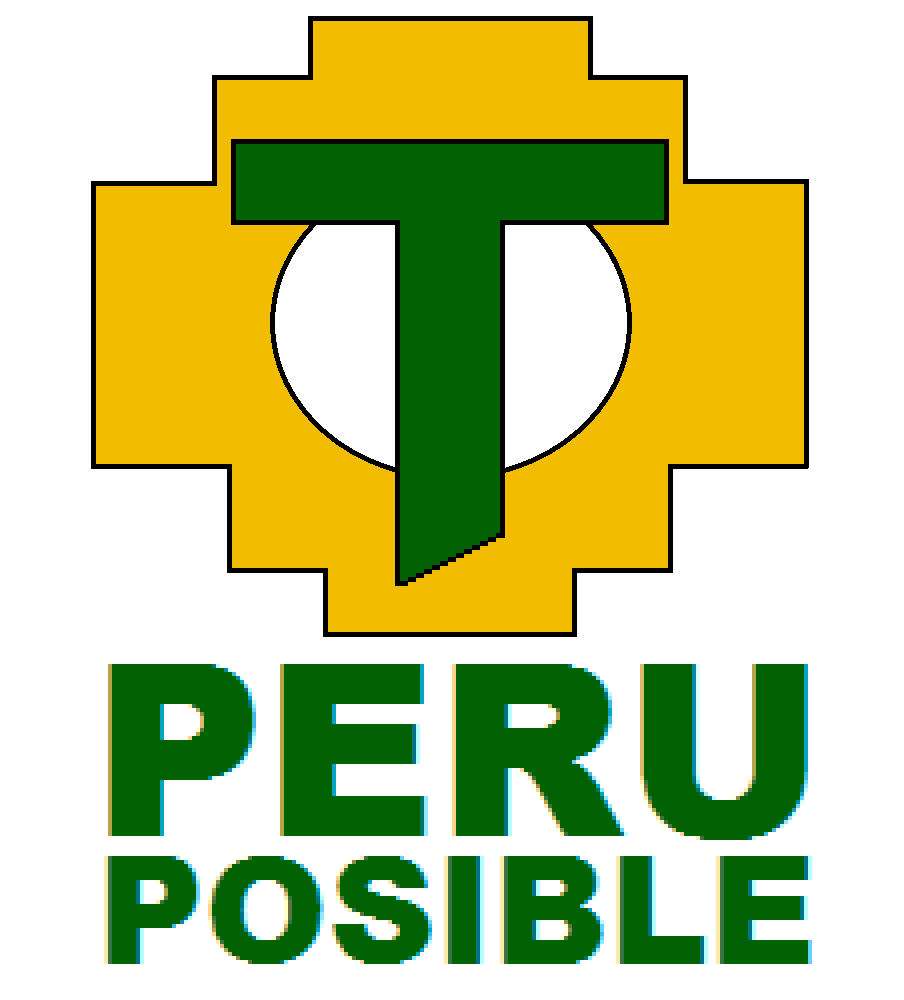
- Abbreviation: AEPP
- Leader: Alejandro Toledo
- Party Presidents: Alejandro Toledo (PP); Javier Alva Orlandini (AP); Fernando Andrade (PDSP)
- Founded: 2010
- Dissolved: 2011
- Headquarters: Lima
- Ideology: Ecologism; Reformism; Christian humanism
- Political position: Center to centre-left
- Colours: Green

Website
- alianzaperuposible.org/web/

The Possible Peru Electoral Alliance (Spanish: Alianza Electoral Perú Posible) was an electoral alliance in Peru formed for the 2011 general election, dominated by the eponymous party Possible Peru and led by presidential candidate and ex-president Alejandro Toledo.

== Constituent Parties ==
- Possible Peru (Perú Posible, PP), ecologist and liberal, aligned behind former president Toledo
- Popular Action (Acción Popular, AP), with a long tradition since 1956, reformist and nationalist
- We Are Peru (Somos Perú, SP), christian democratic and christian humanism

In the 2006 general election, Popular Action and We Are Peru formed the Center Front (Frente del Centro) while Toledo's party Possible Peru contested separately.

In the congressional election on April 10, the alliance won 14.8% of the popular vote and 21 of 130 seats, making them the third largest force in Congress. In the elections for the five Peruvian members of the Andean Parliament, they won 14.8% of the popular vote and one representative: Javier Reátegui.

Presidential candidate Alejandro Toledo won 15.6% of the votes, placing him fourth and failed to qualify for the run-off.

The Possible Peru Alliance has formed a majority coalition in Congress with Peru Wins, the left-wing Nationalists-dominated alliance of Ollanta Humala. Therefore, Toledo suggested to vote for Humala in the run-off on 5 June.

== Parliamentary Alliance ==
Twenty of the 21 representatives elected on the Possible Peru Alliance's lists has formed the Parliamentary Alliance (Spanish: Alianza Parlamentaria) group in Congress. Carlos Bruce, who had been expelled from Possible Peru for publicly criticizing the party's coalition with Peru Wins, has joined the small oppositional, APRA-dominated group Parliamentary Coordination.

=== Dissolution ===
In June 2012, the 5 members of Popular Action resigned from the Possible Peru bench, due to Possible Peru support for the official candidate for the presidency of the Congress of the Republic of Peru, when the popular member Víctor Andrés was proposed for the same position. Garcia Belaunde. In such circumstances and in response to the request of their party bases, the Political Committee and the National Executive Committee of Popular Action decided that their party should constitute its own bench. In this way, the President of Acción Popular, Dr. Javier Alva Orlandini, authorized the congressmen of his party to initiate coordination with independent congressmen in order to carry out said decision.

After that, in early June 2013, Cecilia Tait, along with Wuilian Monterola, Marco Falconí, Norman Lewis and Mariano Portugal, resigned from Peru Posible due to various discrepancies with that party.

== Electoral results ==
=== Presidential election ===
Year	Candidate	Coalition	Votes	Percentage	Outcome
2011	Alejandro Toledo	Possible Peru Electoral Alliance PP-AP-PDSP	2,289,561	15.63	4th

=== Election to the Congress of the Republic ===
Year	Votes	%	Seats	▲/▼	Position
2011	1 904 180	14.8%	21 / 130	▲21	Minority
