= Carlos Bruce =

Peruvian politician (born 1957)

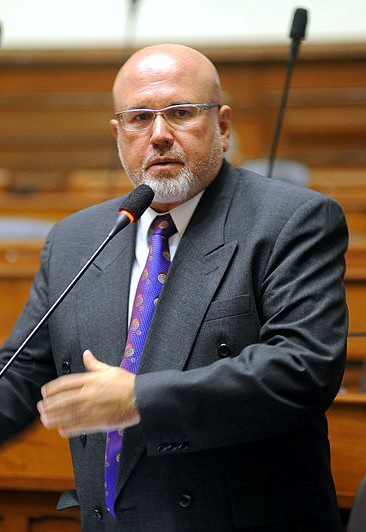

Member of Congress
- In office July 26, 2006 – September 30, 2019
- Constituency: Lima

Minister of Housing, Construction and Sanitation
- In office 11 March 2019 – 26 April 2019
- President: Martín Vizcarra
- Preceded by: Javier Piqué
- Succeeded by: Miguel Estrada
- In office 17 September 2017 – 2 April 2018
- President: Pedro Pablo Kuczynski
- Preceded by: Edmer Trujillo
- Succeeded by: Javier Piqué
- In office 12 July 2002 – 11 August 2005
- President: Alejandro Toledo
- Preceded by: Office created
- Succeeded by: Rudecindo Vega

Minister of the Presidency
- In office 28 July 2001 – 12 July 2002
- President: Alejandro Toledo
- Preceded by: Emilio Navarro
- Succeeded by: Ministry deactivated

Personal details
- Born: 24 February 1957 (age 69) Lima, Peru
- Party: Go on Country - Social Integration Party (2022-present)
- Other political affiliations: Independent (2011-2022); Possible Peru (2004-2011)
- Spouse: Marlis Lambrecht (div.)
- Children: 2
- Education: University of Lima (BA)
- Profession: Economist

Carlos Ricardo Bruce Montes de Oca (born 24 February 1957) is a Peruvian politician and a former Congressman, representing Lima from 2006 until 2019, when his term ended with the dissolution of the Congress by Martín Vizcarra in 2019.

== Early life and education ==
Son of Eduardo José Bruce Noronha and Alicia Montes de Oca Flores, Bruce studied at the Immaculate Heart School and then at the Santa María Marianistas School. Once he graduated, he entered the University of Lima to study Economics, later he began to work in the construction, metalworking, fishery and foreign trade sectors. He has been President of the Association of Exporters of Peru (ADEX), President of the Latin American Federation of Exporters (FLADEX), President of the Business Anti-Drug Trafficking Coalition (CEAD), Vice President of the International Chamber of Commerce (CCI-Peru), Director of the National Confederation of Private Business Institutions (CONFIEP) and member of the Board of Directors of the Commission for the Promotion of Exporters (PROMPEX). He has also served as an international consultant, member of the Editorial Board of Diario Síntesis and professor at the Faculty of Economics at the University of Lima. He was also President of FONCODES, of the "Special Social Productive To Work Program", of the "Investment Fund for the Development of Ancash", of the "Commission for the Prioritization of Investments of the Department of Pasco" (CESPPASCO), of the "Fondo Mi Housing "and Director of FONAFE.

== Political career ==
=== Early political career ===
In early 2000 he joined the party We Are Peru of Lima's charismatic mayor Alberto Andrade, in which he left later in the same year. In 2001, he became the campaign manager for Possible Peru (PP) of successful presidential candidate Alejandro Toledo in Lima. In President Toledo's administration, Bruce held different important posts: Minister of the Presidency from mid-2001 to mid-2002 and Minister of Housing, Construction and Sanitation from July 2002 through October 2005. From 2002 to 2005 he was a General secretary of PP party. He was the candidate for Second Vice President on the party's ticket in the 2006 general election, but the candidacy was withdrawn following disputes between presidential candidate Rafael Belaúnde Aubry and the party's core.

Since September 2005 he has been a member of the party's national political commission.

=== Congressman ===
In 2006, Bruce was elected to the Congress representing Lima for the 2006-2011 term. From 2010 to 2011 he managed the campaign of Toledo for a second non-consecutive presidential term, endorsed by Possible Peru Alliance with himself being Toledo's running mate as candidate for First vice president. Toledo's presidential bid was unsuccessful, but Carlos Bruce was re-elected Congressman for another 5-year term. On July 29, 2011, he was accused of dishonoring his political party and has been suspended from Possible Peru, being independent in congress. In 2016, he was re-elected for a third term under the Peruvians for Change party of Pedro Pablo Kuczynski for another 5-year term, but his term was cut short by the dissolution of the Congress by Martín Vizcarra in 2019.

On 11 March 2019, he was sworn in for the third time to the position of Minister of Housing, Construction and Sanitation in the new Council of Ministers of Martín Vizcarra, presided by Salvador del Solar. Together with Bruce, seven other new ministers were sworn in, forming a joint cabinet. He lasted 34 days in office. On April 14, 2019, he was forced to resign due to open investigations filed by the Prosecutor of the Nation Zoraida Ávalos against him and four other congressmen: Cesar Vásquez, José Palma Mendoza, Clemente Flores Vílchez and Javier Velásquez Quesquén for alleged links to the criminal organization "Los temerarios del crimen" headed by the ex-mayor of Chiclayo David Cornejo.

== Post-congressional career ==
For the 2021 general election, Bruce joined Keiko Fujimori's technical team as an independent.

Joining the Go on Country - Social Integration Party in early 2022, Bruce was then elected mayor of the Santiago de Surco district of Lima at the 2022 municipal elections.

== Personal life ==
Bruce, following his introduction of a civil unions bill to Congress and the subsequent questioning of his sexual orientation, came out as gay on 19 May 2014. That made him the first openly gay member of the Congress in Peru. On August 27, 2024, Bruce married Peruvian dentist Alejandro Quiroz, his partner of five years, in a private ceremony in Madrid, Spain.

== Controversies ==
On June 5, 2019, Bruce launched a controversy with comments that were described as racist towards President Martín Vizcarra. The official parliamentarian assured that Moquegua was only a small region and that Vizcarra had been included in the presidential roster due to the need to require a provincial to represent the interior of the country.
