= Javier Reátegui =

Peruvian politician (born 1944)

Javier Reátegui Rosello (born April 28, 1944) is a Possible Peru Alliance member and a former Peruvian Interior Minister. He resigned in 2005 due to events relating to Antauro Humala occupying a rural police station in Andahuaylas.
