= 2011 Peruvian general election =

- Presidential election
- 10 April 2011 (first round); 5 June 2011 (second round)
- Opinion polls
- Turnout: 83.71% (first round) ▼5.00pp 82.54% (second round) ▼5.17pp
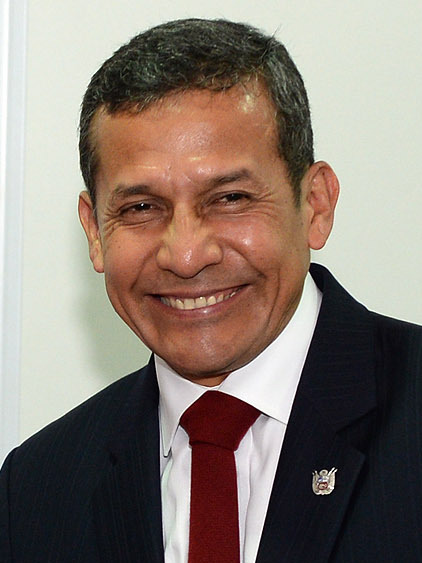

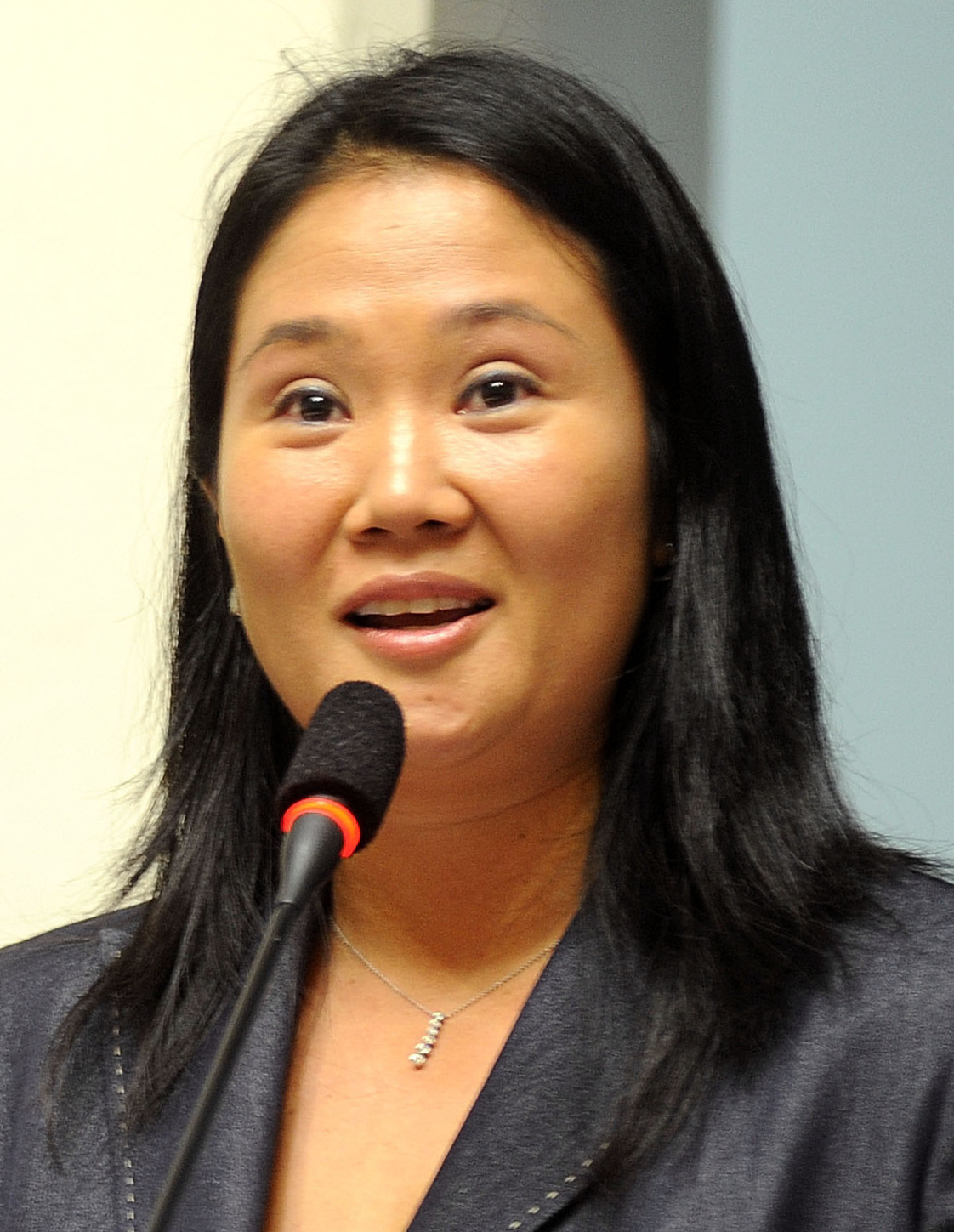
Nominee	Ollanta Humala	Keiko Fujimori
Party	PNP	Force 2011
Alliance	Peru Wins
Running mate	Marisol Espinoza; Omar Chehade	Rafael Rey; Jaime Yoshiyama
Popular vote	7,937,704	7,490,647
Percentage	51.45%	48.55%
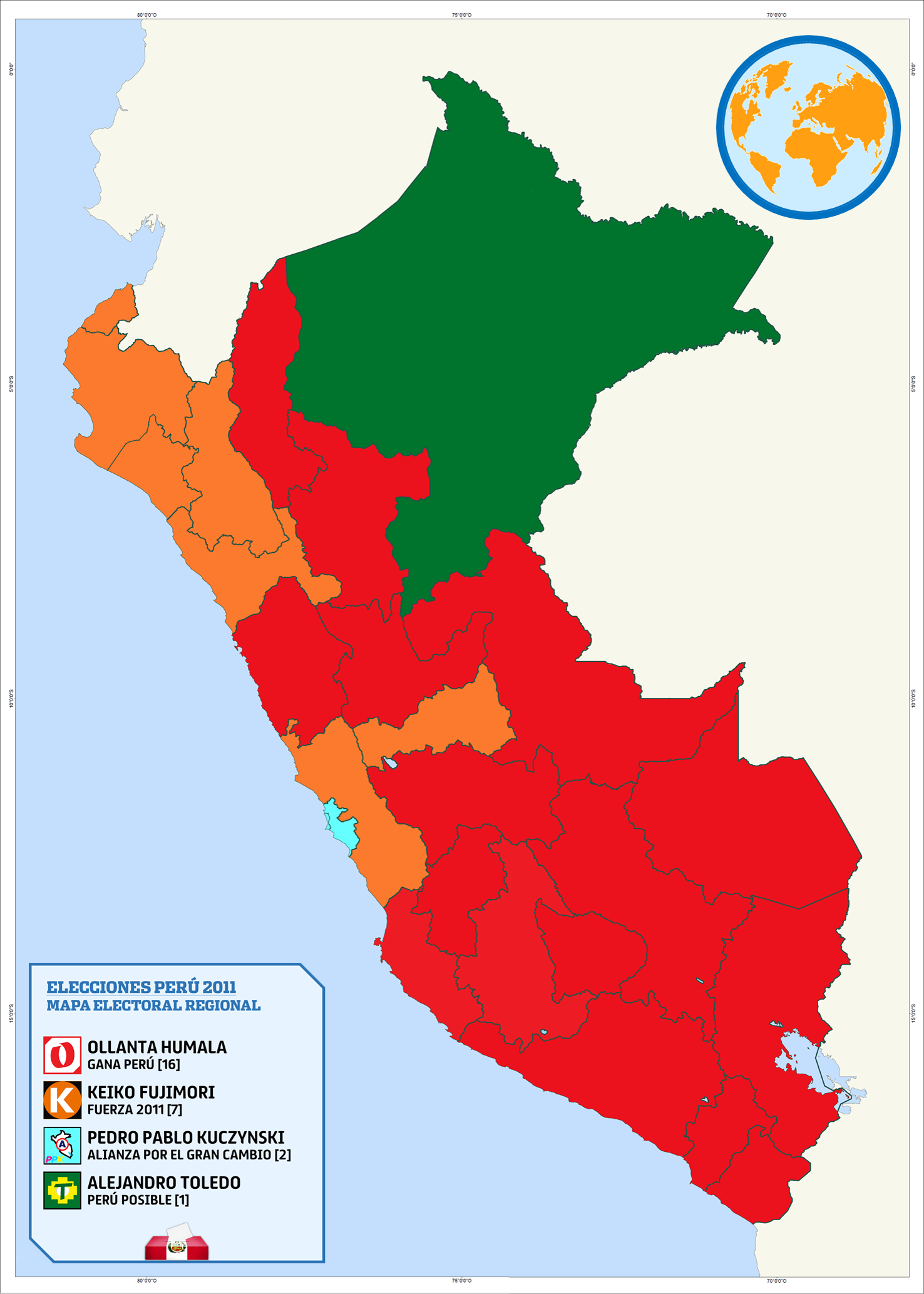
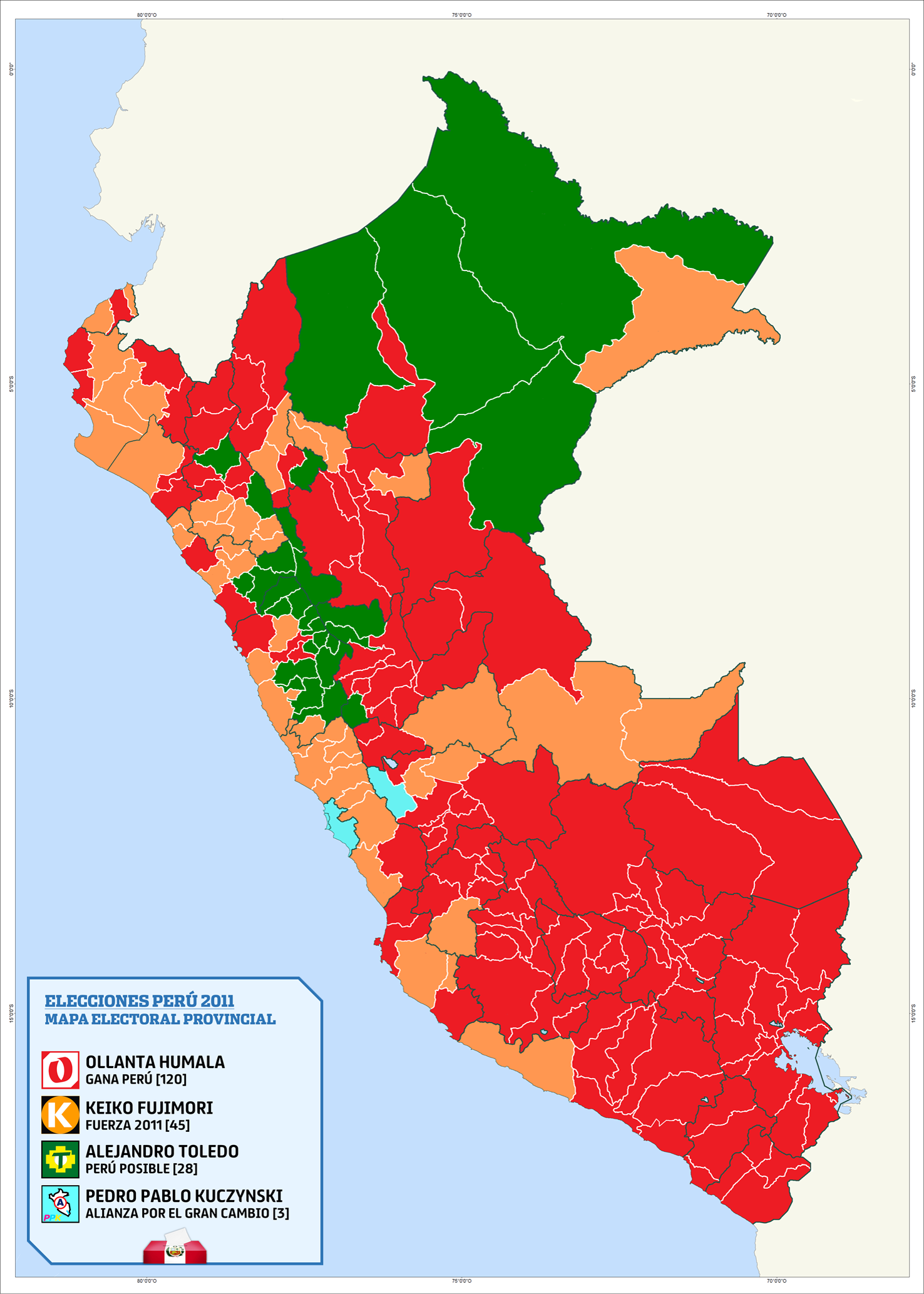
President before election
Alan García
APRA
Elected President
Ollanta Humala
Peru Wins
- Congressional election
- 10 April 2011
- All 130 seats in the Congress of Peru; 66 seats needed for a majority
Party	Leader	Vote %	Seats	+/–
Peru Wins	Ollanta Humala	25.27	47	+47
Force 2011	Keiko Fujimori	22.97	37	+24
Possible Peru	Alejandro Toledo	14.83	21	+19
APGC	Pedro Pablo Kuczynski	14.42	12	+10
ASN	Luis Castañeda Lossio	10.22	9	−36
APRA	Alan García	6.43	4	−32
This lists parties that won seats. See the complete results below.
Results by department

General elections were held in Peru on 10 April 2011 to elect the president, the vice presidents, 130 members of Congress and five members of the Andean Parliament. As no presidential candidate received a majority in the first round, a second round was held on 5 June to determine the successor of outgoing president Alan García. Former army officer Ollanta Humala narrowly defeated Keiko Fujimori, daughter of imprisoned former President Alberto Fujimori. Humala was sworn in as the 94th President of Peru on 28 July.

== Background ==
After the third presidential term of Alberto Fujimori, new rules were established to curtail presidential authority. The outgoing president is now forbidden to run for reelection until five years have elapsed since the end of a presidential term.

Peruvian politics adhere to a multi-party system, in which no one political group has a majority in Congress. This has led recent administrations to form loose alliances while in office to govern effectively. Such multi-party system has been in place ever since the administration of President Alberto Fujimori (1990–2000), following his 1992 dissolution of Congress.

The elections are organised by three groups. First of all the RENIEC (National Registry of Identification and Civil Status), they are in charge of maintaining the civil records. And by that they define who has to vote and who doesn't. In Peru, all citizens aged 18 to 70 are compelled to vote, elections being discretionary past the age of 70. The real organization of the elections and also of all other referendums is done by the ONPE (National Office of Electoral Processes). The last organisation is the JNE (National Jury of Elections), they are looking into the legality of the elections and the campaign plans.

== Presidential candidates ==
Presidential tickets
Peru Wins	Force 2011	Alliance for the Great Change	Possible Peru Electoral Alliance	National Solidarity Alliance
Ollanta Humala	Keiko Fujimori	Pedro Pablo Kuczynski	Alejandro Toledo	Luis Castañeda
	Member of Congress (2006–2011)	President of the Council of Ministers (2005–2006)	President of Peru (2001-2006)	Mayor of Lima (2003-2010)
Running mates
1st: Marisol Espinoza; 2nd: Omar Chehade	1st: Rafael Rey; 2nd: Jaime Yoshiyama	1st: Máximo San Román; 2nd: Marisol Pérez Tello	1st: Carlos Bruce; 2nd: Javier Reátegui	1st: Augusto Ferrero Costa; 2nd: Carmen Rosa Núñez

The election campaigns started early in the summer of 2010. During most of 2010, polls were led by two right wing political parties: National Solidarity, led by former mayor of Lima Luis Castañeda Lossio and Force 2011, led by ex-president Alberto Fujimori's daughter, Keiko Fujimori. In November 2010, the Alliance for the Great Change launched the candidacy of the former prime minister Pedro Pablo Kuczynski. Claiming a more centrist stand are, the ruling party APRA and Possible Peru, the latter under the leadership of former Peruvian President Alejandro Toledo.

The left-wing politician Ollanta Humala is supported by the Peruvian Nationalist Party.

The Fuerza Social and Cambio Radical do not have presidential candidates. The incumbent Alan García's American Popular Revolutionary Alliance is also not fielding a candidate in the election.

Political Party or Group	Presidential candidate	Candidate for First Vice President	Candidate for Second Vice President
Peru Wins Alliance: Peruvian Nationalist Party (Partido Nacionalista Peruano); Socialist Party (Partido Socialista); Peruvian Communist Party (Partido Comunista Peruano); Revolutionary Socialist Party (Partido Socialista Revolucionario); Political Movement Socialist Voice (Movimiento Político Voz Socialista)	Ollanta Humala	Marisol Espinoza	Omar Chehade
Force 2011 Alliance: Force 2011 (Fuerza 2011); National Renewal (Renovación Nacional)	Keiko Fujimori	Rafael Rey	Jaime Yoshiyama
Possible Peru Alliance: Possible Peru (Perú Posible); We Are Peru (Somos Perú); Popular Action (Acción Popular)	Alejandro Toledo	Carlos Bruce	Javier Reátegui
Alliance for the Great Change: Alliance for Progress (Alianza para el Progreso); Peruvian Humanist Party (Partido Humanista Peruano); Christian People's Party (Partido Popular Cristiano); National Restoration (Restauración Nacional)	Pedro Pablo Kuczynski	Máximo San Román	Marisol Pérez Tello
National Solidarity Alliance: National Solidarity (Solidaridad Nacional); Change 90 (Cambio 90); Always Together (Siempre Unidos); All for Peru (Todos por el Perú); Union for Peru (Unión por el Perú)	Luis Castañeda Lossio	Augusto Ferrero Costa	Carmen Rosa Núñez
Justice, Technology and Ecology	Humberto Pinazo	Wilson Barrantes	Víctor Girao
National Awakening Party	Ricardo Noriega	Martina Portocarrero	Roberto Villar
Peruvian Fonavista Party	José Ñique de la Puente	Andrés Alcántara	Cecilia Grados Guerrero
National Force Party	Juliana Reymer	Julio Macedo	Sergio Gallardo
Ahead Political Party	Rafael Belaúnde Aubry	Luis Destefano	Sixto Vilcas

Voluntarily Withdrawn
Political party	Candidate			Withdrawal	
Name	for President	for 1st Vice-president	for 2nd Vice-president	Date	Motive
American Popular Revolutionary Alliance; APRA	Mercedes Araóz Fernández	Javier Velásquez	Nidia Vílchez	17 January	Internal Party disputes
Social Force; Fuerza Social	Manuel Rodríguez Cuadros	Vladimiro Huaroc	Elva Quiñones	18 March	Mr. Rodríguez claimed lack of credibility of electoral process

Alejandro Toledo is a former president.

Keiko Fujimori campaign ran on support of the status quo free-market policies, however she was seen as hindered because of her ties to her father Alberto Fujimori, who is in prison for corruption and human rights crimes following a crackdown on the Túpac Amaru Revolutionary Movement in the 1990s, following the Japanese embassy hostage crisis in 1996–1997. In addition, her campaign has been criticized for vote-buying.

Pedro Pablo Kuczynski, a former prime minister, is also known as "El Gringo" because he has U.S. citizenship and is of European descent. His support was seen as limited outside Lima because of his support amongst the country's elite.

Ollanta Humala, who had once led a military revolt in 2000 that was quickly put down, softened what was seen as his anti-capitalist tone to look more moderate along the lines of Brazil's former president Luiz Inácio Lula da Silva. He told a campaign rally that "We are willing to make many concessions to unite Peru, we are going to talk with all political forces. Social problems must be resolved through dialogue. Let's vote without fear." Voters were seen to vote against Garcia in order to have a "fairer division of Peru's booming economy – backed by rich mineral resources – a key issue for more than a third of the population still living in poverty." The other candidates tried to discredit him by saying he would increase state control over the economy, roll back reforms and jeopardise about $40bn in potential foreign investment over the next decade in mining and energy exploration. Moody's ratings agency also said that Peru's investment-grade credit rating would not be threatened should Humala win. Despite this the sol and the Lima Stock Exchange's flagship index main stock index fell over the two weeks before the first round of the election on speculation that Humala would raise mining taxes, increase state subsidies and/or tighten control of such "strategic" sectors as electricity.

Opinion polls conducted in late May 2011 showed Fujimori and Humala in a statistical tie in a runoff vote scheduled for 5 June 2011, with one point separating the two candidates.

=== Support for the second round ===
Some of the candidates and parties eliminated in second round have expressed their support for one of the contestants in the run-off election.

Alliance for the Great Change candidate P. P. Kuczynski declared that he would vote for Fujimori, as well as his running mate Máximo San Román and ally Humberto Lay (National Restoration), whereas Humanists' leader Yehude Simon declared his support for Humala.

The Possible Peru Alliance and its candidate Alejandro Toledo also announced support for the "Peru Wins"-candidate in exchange for a participation in Humala's aspired government.

National Solidarity leader Luis Castañeda on the other hand uttered his backing for the Force 2011 frontwoman.

APRA did not have a clear party line but former Prime minister Javier Velásquez inclined to Keiko Fujimori's side.

Nobel laureate writer Mario Vargas Llosa, liberal presidential candidate of 1990 and opponent of Alberto Fujimori, stated that he would "never vote" for Fujimori's daughter and warned the nation of a "return to dictatorship" that came up with a victory of Keiko. He, personally, would vote for Humala, "unhappily and with fear" but as the lesser evil.

== Debates ==
=== First round ===
Date	Host	Location	Moderator	Subject	Highlights
3 March	El Comercio	El Comercio headquarters Lima	Juan Paredes Castro	Education, security, social inclusion and free subject	The eleven presidential candidates presented their proposals. Alejandro Toledo won the newspaper poll.
13 March	Jurado Nacional de Elecciones	Colegio Médico; Lima	Federico Salazar	Varied	
3 April	Asociación Civil Transparencia	Sheraton Hotel; Lima	José María Salcedo	Varied	Only the top five candidates are to be included. This has caused various criticisms from other candidates, who argue that the debate is undemocratic and exclusive. Political analysts agreed that the 5 main candidates didn't make new proposals.

=== Second round ===
Date	Host	Location	Moderator	Subject	Highlights
29 May	National Jury of Elections	Marriott Hotel; Lima	José María Salcedo	Varied	Presidential hopefuls Ollanta Humala and Keiko Fujimori squared off in a bitter final debate on Sunday in Lima, one week before general elections that will decide the Andean country's next president.

== Results ==
=== President ===
First round results by department (small left) and municipality (big right)

Second round results by department (small left) and municipality (big right)

Candidate	Party	First round		Second round	
Candidate	Party	Votes	%	Votes	%
Ollanta Humala	Peru Wins	4,643,064	31.70	7,937,704	51.45
Keiko Fujimori	Force 2011	3,449,595	23.55	7,490,647	48.55
Pedro Pablo Kuczynski	Alliance for the Great Change	2,711,450	18.51		
Alejandro Toledo	Possible Peru	2,289,561	15.63		
Luis Castañeda Lossio	National Solidarity Alliance	1,440,143	9.83		
José Ñique de la Puente	Fonavistas of Peru	37,011	0.25		
Ricardo Noriega	National Awakening Party	21,574	0.15		
Rafael Belaúnde Aubry	Forward Party	17,301	0.12		
Juliana Reymer	National Force Party	16,831	0.11		
Humberto Pinazo	Justice, Technology, Ecology	11,275	0.08		
Manuel Rodríguez Cuadros	Decentralist Social Force Party	9,358	0.06		
Total		14,647,163	100.00	15,428,351	100.00
Valid votes		14,647,163	87.71	15,428,351	93.70
Invalid/blank votes		2,052,571	12.29	1,038,046	6.30
Total votes		16,699,734	100.00	16,466,397	100.00
Registered voters/turnout		19,949,915	83.71	19,949,915	82.54
Source: JNE

=== Congress ===
Party	Votes	%	Seats
Peru Wins	3,245,003	25.27	47
Force 2011	2,948,781	22.97	37
Possible Peru Alliance	1,904,180	14.83	21
Alliance for the Great Change	1,851,080	14.42	12
National Solidarity Alliance	1,311,766	10.22	9
American Popular Revolutionary Alliance	825,030	6.43	4
Radical Change	347,475	2.71	0
Fonavistas of Peru	170,052	1.32	0
Decentralist Social Force Party	108,200	0.84	0
Forward Party	42,276	0.33	0
National Force Party	37,633	0.29	0
National Awakening Party	30,190	0.24	0
Justice, Technology, Ecology	17,478	0.14	0
Total	12,839,144	100.00	130
Valid votes	12,839,144	76.87	
Invalid/blank votes	3,862,475	23.13	
Total votes	16,701,619	100.00	
Registered voters/turnout	19,949,915	83.72	
Source: JNE

=== Andean Parliament ===
Party	Votes	%	Seats
Peru Wins	2,740,147	27.02	2
Force 2011	2,353,674	23.21	1
Possible Peru Alliance	1,498,784	14.78	1
Alliance for the Great Change	1,413,785	13.94	1
National Solidarity Alliance	954,619	9.41	0
American Popular Revolutionary Alliance	638,675	6.30	0
Radical Change	195,441	1.93	0
Fonavistas of Peru	158,877	1.57	0
Decentralist Social Force Party	65,265	0.64	0
Justice, Technology, Ecology	49,869	0.49	0
Forward Party	36,193	0.36	0
National Force Party	35,014	0.35	0
Total	10,140,343	100.00	5
Valid votes	10,140,343	60.71	
Invalid/blank votes	6,563,234	39.29	
Total votes	16,703,577	100.00	
Registered voters/turnout	19,949,915	83.73	
Source: JNE, ONPE

== Reactions ==
Fujimori congratulated Humala on his victory after admitting defeat.

States

- Bolivia – After the first-round, President Evo Morales sent a letter to Humala congratulating him and said of those who voted for him did so "to advance with the transformation of their nation and its institutions...Receive in my name, from the government and from the Bolivian people, a fraternal and revolutionary salute."
- Colombia – President Juan Manuel Santos called Humala the next day to congratulate him for his "victory in the electoral vote that consolidates the Peruvian democracy. Santos reiterated Colombia's commitment to continue working at the strengthening of relations between the two countries and of all Latin America." This was despite concerns in Colombia of being "surrounded by leftists."

Finance Minister Juan Carlos Echeverry said that a merger between the two countries' stock exchanges was unlikely to be affected. He also said that Humala could "prove the markets wrong" in reference to concerns over former Brazilian President Luiz Inácio Lula da Silva's electoral victory. However, the Bogotá Stock Exchange indices also fell.

Economic

The Lima Stock Exchange index also plunged the following day amid concerns of Humala's economic policies and cabinet ministers.

== Government formation ==
Former president Alejandro Toledo was set to be in talk with Humala to join his government in some form. However, in mid-July he quit the talks, though he said legislators from their two parties would vote together on some issues.

About a week before his inauguration Humala introduced a cabinet line-up that was positively received by financial markets and the business community because most appointees were read as "moderate" and "establishment" figures who thus allayed apparent fears of radical change. His cabinet line-up includes:

Appointee	Position
Ollanta Humala	President
Marisol Espinoza	First Vice President
Omar Chehade	Second Vice President
Salomon Lerner Ghitis	Prime Minister
Rafael Roncagliolo	Foreign Minister
Miguel Castilla	Economy and Finance Minister (Incumbent Deputy Finance Minister)
Carlos Oliva	Deputy Finance Minister
Laura Calderon	Deputy Economy Minister(Incumbent chief of the tax agency)
Daniel Mora	Defense Minister
Oscar Valdes	Interior Minister
Francisco Eguiguren	Justice Minister
Miguel Zalazzi Caillaux	Agriculture Minister
Alberto Tejada	Health Minister
Patricia Salas	Education Minister
José Luis Silva Martinot	Foreign Commerce and Tourism Minister
Rudecindo Vega	Labour Minister
Carlos Paredes Rodríguez	Transport and Communications Minister
Ricardo Giesecke	Environment Minister
Kurt Burneo	Development and Social Inclusion Minister
Kurt Burneo	Production Minister
Carlos Herrera	Energy and Mines Minister
René Cornejo	Housing, Construction and Sanitation Minister
Susana Baca	Culture Minister
Aída García-Naranjo	Women and Social Development Minister
Julio Velarde	Central Reserve Bank of Peru President (incumbent)

On 18 August, the cabinet authorised the creation of the Ministry of Development and Social Inclusion whose function would be to implement the social programmes of the government to promote "social inclusion." The ministry was created to turn the social programmes into productive tools for the benefit of the poor and that one of its objectives would be to create the conditions so that beneficiaries of the Juntos programme use subsidies for "financial leverage" so as to improve their quality of life.

As a result of Humala's appointees, which came in contrast to concerns he would introduce changes that could hurt Peru's economic growth, Peru's sol-denominated bonds increased as yields fell from 7.84 percent for maturities in due in August 2020 to 6.12 percent. The bond prices gained 0.29 centimo to 111.78 centimos per sol, the highest since 23 February. Carlos Herrera said that Peru would seek a mining windfall profits tax after consultations with companies.

Reaction

In reaction to the perceived "moderate" appointments the sol held steady at a three-year high. The credit rating agency Fitch also reaffirmed Peru's BBB− credit rating with a positive outlook. The decision to keep Velarde at the Central Bank also resulted in a rise for the Lima Stock Exchange's indices. Roque Benavides, the chief executive officer of Cia. de Minas Buenaventura SA, (Peru's largest precious metals producer) said of Humala's ministerial appointees that "there are very, very good ministers who have been called to contribute. What we have now is better than what we expected." Mining companies such as Southern Copper and Cia. de Minas Buenaventura SA had previously warned against a tax on sales, which could make the mining industry less competitive and affect the US$42 billion in planned mining investment. Southern Copper said that it expected a "positive result" from consultation talks on the proposed new windfall tax levy on mining companies. Financial Planning Manager Raul Jacob said that the government would continue to support new mining projects like the US$1 billion Tia Maria copper mine. "We think the government will establish the taxation but will maintain the cost-competiveness [sic] of the mining industry. [The company is] confident that good investment conditions, stability, social inclusion and growth will prevail in Peru."

However, his softening stance on regulating and taxing the mining sector caused consternation amongst some of his original supporters. Mario Huaman, the head of the General Workers' Confederation (the largest labour union in Peru, who also endorsed Humala) said that: "We're worried. We'll listen very carefully to what he says in the coming days and see if he shares our views. Then we'll decide our plan of action, our plan to fight. He promised change." Renee Ramirez, the general secretary of the Education Workers Union said that: "The new government has built up such great hopes that if it doesn't follow through there'll be a big divorce. We're not going to keep quiet. We threw our weight behind Humala but we didn't write him a blank check."

Alvaro Vargas Llosa, a senior fellow at the Washington, D.C.–based Independent Institute and son of Mario Vargas Llosa said that "He has to find a way to keep the base close while not letting it dictate economic policy." Erasto Almeida, a political analyst at Eurasia Group added that if his opinion rating drops further or the economy slows that Humala "could be tempted later on in his mandate" to adopt less market-friendly policies.

Indigenous groups, such as AIDESEP in the Amazon, have expressed disappointment with Humala's move away from the left amidst his campaign promises to champion the Inca empire. They cited such reasons as Humala plan to go through with a Garcia-era proposal to bring in up to US$20 billion in the next five years, US$6.2 billion of which Garcia had already lined-up, for such measures as oil exploration in the Amazon. Alberto Pizango, the head AIDESEP, said that "The [indigenous] communities had entrusted this government to oversee a real, profound change. But Humala has altered his discourse, leading the people to say this government will just be more of the same." He also criticised the appointment of Herrera because of the latter's approval of petroleum concessions when he first held the ministerial post in 2000.

Former President Alan García chaired his final cabinet meeting on 27 July. At it he said:

I wanted to thank all of the ministers, also the regional presidents have put in a great deal of effort into their jobs, and mayors who are those who develop directly and closely with the people. [I am convinced that] when you put zeal aside, history will recognise what these ministers achieved with their effort. Much will have to be done for our country, but I think that the path chosen was the correct one, and the perseverance and the dedication was necessary. A salute to Peru, to the youth of Peru, to the poor of Peru, to the authorities of Peru, and as a follower of Haya de La Torre all I wanted to do was make a government that gives bread with freedom. A salute to Peru, to its future and success."

=== Inauguration ===
Prior to his inauguration on 28 July, Humala's popularity fell in opinion polls after he suspended his brother Alexis Humala from Gana Peru following allegations of corruption in relation to deals with Gazprom. His approval rating of 70% fell to 41%.

For inauguration day itself Lima's main downtown square was scheduled to be open without security restrictions. Javier Sanguinetti, police chief for the Lima region, said that his office was working with the tourism police department and that 10,000 police officers would be deployed at popular tourist attractions around Lima on 28 and 29 July.

Former President Alan García was not scheduled to attend the event because, according to him, the inauguration "is to hear the new president's message" and that although he attended Alberto Fujimori's inauguration in 1990 "there was such unrest in congress, because of my presence, that I'd rather focus on my health, and say ‘Let the new president give his message freely, let's not vent our frustrations in front of foreign heads of state.'" His critics read this as a snub to Humala. However, foreign dignitaries such as Colombia's Juan Manuel Santos was scheduled to attend the event, along with Brazil's Dilma Rousseff, Uruguay's José Mujica, Panama's Ricardo Martinelli (and his wife First Lady Marta Linares de Martinelli), Argentina's Cristina Fernández de Kirchner, Chile's Sebastián Piñera, Ecuador's Rafael Correa, Bolivia's Evo Morales, Guatemala's Álvaro Colom, Honduras’ Porfirio Lobo, South Africa's Jacob Zuma and Georgia's Mikheil Saakashvili. They would also be joined by Cuban First Vice President Jose Ramon Machado Ventura and his delegation, Spain's crown prince Felipe, Prince of Asturias, Secretary-general of the Organization of American States Jose Miguel Insulza, the U.S. ambassador, the brother of South Korean President Lee Myung-bak, Lee Sang-deuk of the incumbent Grand National Party and Chinese President Hu Jintao's special envoy Minister of Agriculture Han Changfu.

Piñera, who was welcomed by outgoing Economics Minister Ismael Benavides after his arrival at 23:00 said: "From the core of my soul, I want to wish President Humala the best of luck, as well as to the Peruvian government and the Peruvian people." Santos, who was welcomed by outgoing Prime Minister Rosario Fernández, said that "We consider Peru a true strategic partner on many fronts. Every relationship can be strengthened, improved. The relationship with Peru has been extraordinary, but we're going to see how we can continue feeding it, strengthening it, improving it." Machado Ventura, who was welcomed by the outgoing Minister of the Interior Miguel Hidalgo, relayed greetings and said that Humala electoral victory was an "example of the continuing advance of progressive forces in Latin America;" he added that the proposed a "nationalist programme" would "promote greater equity in the distribution of the country's wealth and that Cuba wishes him success in this effort." His delegation also included Foreign Minister Bruno Rodríguez Parrilla, Deputy Foreign Minister Rogelio Sierra, the new Cuban ambassador to Peru Juana Martínez González and the outgoing Cuban ambassador Luis Delfín Pérez. The delegation was also invited Peru's commemoration of their 190 anniversary of independence. The outgoing President Alan García hosted a reception for the visiting heads of state and foreign dignitaries the night before the inauguration. Morales and Piñera also scheduled a bilateral meeting on the sidelines of the event.

Garcia left the presidential palace after he passed on the presidential sash to Humala. Before wearing the sash, Humala also made a speech in which he promised "to fight for social integration, particularly of the poorest." He also said that he would not alter the existing market-oriented policies and would keep trade policies intact; he added that he provide a minimum pension for all Peruvians over the age of 65 and raise the minimum wage. "We want the term 'social exclusion' to disappear from our language and lives forever. Economic growth and social inclusion will march together." In tackling social conflict and drug trafficking he said that the United States is a "strategic partner." He also quoted South Africa's Nelson Mandela when he argued that there cannot be a democracy where misery and "social asymmetry" persist." However, he broke with tradition when he did not travel to Congress to attend the inauguration. During the swearing-in ceremony he was shouted down by the "Fujimoristas" (supporters of Keiko Fujimori and her father Alberto) after he said that was taking power" in the spirit of the 1979 constitution: "The constitution of 1979, the last constitution of democratic origin, which many have not respected and that's why it has been forgotten, is for me a true inspiration for its national and democratic content."

=== Initial initiatives ===
On 25 August, the Congress gave its vote of confidence in approving the Council of Ministers after Prime Minister Salomon Lerner Ghitis spoke to the Congress by a vote of 90 in favour, zero against and 33 abstentations, all of whom were from Fuerza 2011. Tejada expressed his satisfaction and gratitude at the recognition of the "technical support" for the government's programmes and goals. "We call on Peruvians to be confident that President Ollanta Humala is setting the beginning of a new phase of growth with social inclusion in the history of Peru, respecting human rights and freedom of speech." The initiatives were backed by the National Confederation of Private Business Associations (CONFIEP) as confirmed by President Humberto Speziani who said that "Overall we agree with all ten policies announced by the Cabinet, which is headed by Salomon Lerner. [Ghitis' goals are] "necessary to grow with social inclusion."

One of Humala's first tasks amongst his promises for social inclusion was to start the implementation of a two-stage 25% increase in the monthly minimum wage to 750 sol and unveiling a pension increase for those older than 65.

Humala also sought to create a national flag carrier airline in cooperation with private investment, especially to such unprofitable domestic markets as the hinterlands of the Andes and the Amazon.

During the first month of Humala's presidency, an agreement was reached with mining companies that would increase taxes by up to three billion sols a year however, Carlos Herrera said a new royalty rate had not been set as yet. Prime Minister Salomon Lerner Ghitis said that "this tax will not affect investment or companies' competitiveness."

Amongst his initial social policies, modeled after Brazil during the tenure of Lula da Silva, were: a non-contributory basic pension of about US$90 per month for the elderly who lack other provisions, a state-run child-care programme, an increase in scholarships for poor students who want a university education and the expansion of a conditional cash transfer scheme for the poor. However, he said that such programmes would be introduced gradually, hence, according to government officials, the cost for the following year would be a more moderate figure of US$275m.
