= Peru Wins =

Peru Wins Gana Perú
- Abbreviation: GP
- Leader: Ollanta Humala
- Founded: 15 December 2010
- Dissolved: 5 June 2012
- Ideology: Left-wing nationalism Socialism of the 21st century
- Political position: Left-wing
- Regional affiliation: São Paulo Forum
- Colors: Red, white

Peru Wins (Spanish: Gana Perú, GP) was a leftist electoral alliance in Peru formed for the 2011 general election. It was dominated by the Peruvian Nationalist Party and led by successful presidential candidate Ollanta Humala Tasso.

== Constituent parties ==
- Peruvian Nationalist Party (Partido Nacionalista Peruano, PNP), left-wing nationalist and populist party, loyal to Humala
- Socialist Party (Partido Socialista, PS), democratic socialist, in the tradition of José Carlos Mariátegui
- Peruvian Communist Party (Partido Comunista Peruano, PCP)
- Revolutionary Socialist Party (Partido Socialista Revolucionario, PSR), founded by left-wing military officers
- Political Movement Socialist Voice (Movimiento Político Voz Socialista, MPVS)
- Peruvian Communist Party (Marxist–Leninist) (Partido Comunista Peruano (Marxista–Leninista), PCP(ML))

In the 2006 elections, the Peruvian Nationalist Party could not register in time for the elections. That is why they formed an alliance with the moderate Union for Peru (UPP), presenting PNP leader Humala as UPP's candidate and lost the runoff to Alan García. The alliance split a short time after the elections and the Nationalists sat on their own bench in Congress. PCP and PSR were parts of the Broad Left Front.

In the congressional election on April 10, the alliance won 25.3% of the popular vote and 47 of 130 seats, making them the largest and the strongest force in Congress. In the elections for the five Peruvian members of the Andean Parliament, the alliance won 27.0% of the popular vote and two representatives: Hilaria Supa and Alberto Adrianzén.

Presidential candidate Ollanta Humala won 31.7% of the popular vote. As the first placer, he could qualify for the run-off election. Eventually, he won the second round against right-wing candidate Keiko Fujimori, daughter of former President Alberto Fujimori of Force 2011 with 51.5% of the popular vote.

Peru Wins formed a majority coalition in Congress with the Possible Peru Alliance, the centrist group of ex-president Alejandro Toledo.

After his inauguration on 28 July 2011, Humala appointed a cabinet mainly consisting of moderate and established experts. This signaled that Peru would not radically shift to the left under Humala.

== Nationalist/Peru Wins parliamentary group ==
All 47 congressmen elected on the party's lists joined the Nationalist/Peru Wins parliamentary group.

At the end of the legislative period, the alliance was shattered. Four years after the election, nearly a third of the lawmakers elected on Peru Wins slates had deserted its benches. In October 2015, even Vice President Marisol Espinoza left the parliamentary group. In the 2016 general election, the PNP does not run at all, while the PCP and PS has joined the Broad Front.

== Electoral results ==
=== Presidential election ===
Year	Candidate	Coalition	Votes	Percentage	Outcome
2011	Ollanta Humala	Peru Wins PNP-PS-PCP-PSR-MPVS	1st Round: 4 643 064	1st Round: 31.70	1st Round: 1st
2011	Ollanta Humala	Peru Wins PNP-PS-PCP-PSR-MPVS	2nd Round: 7 937 704	2nd Round: 51.45	2nd Round: 1st

=== Election to the Congress of the Republic ===
Year	Votes	%	Seats	▲/▼	Position
2011	3 245 003	25.3%	47 / 130	▲47	Minority
