= Alejandro Toledo =

President of Peru from 2001 to 2006

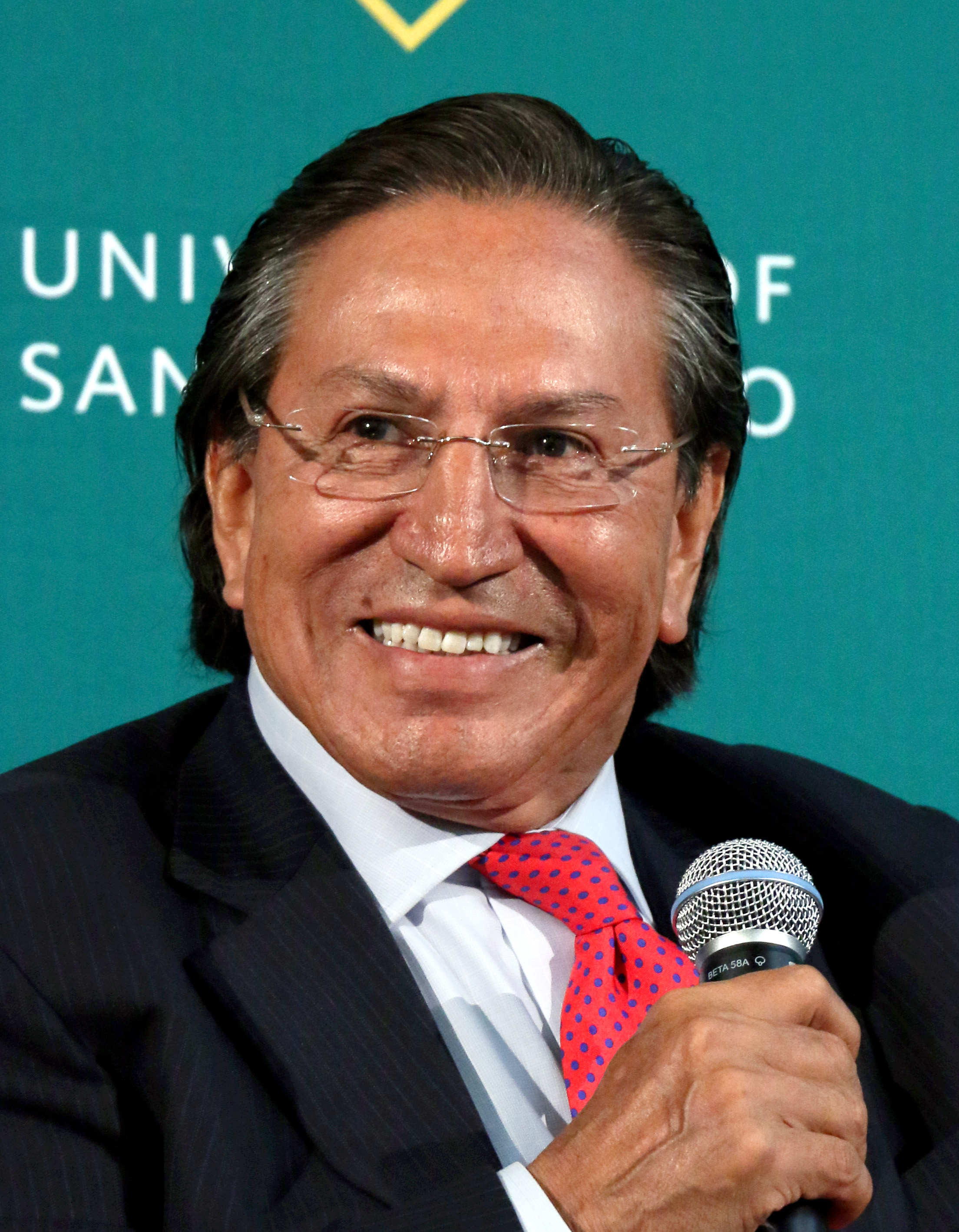
- Toledo in 2015

President of Peru
- In office 28 July 2001 – 28 July 2006
- Prime Minister: Roberto Dañino; Luis Solari; Beatriz Merino; Carlos Ferrero; Pedro Pablo Kuczynski
- Vice President: First Vice President; Raúl Diez Canseco (until 2004); Second Vice President; David Waisman
- Preceded by: Valentín Paniagua
- Succeeded by: Alan García

President of Possible Peru
- In office 1 March 1994 – 13 July 2017
- Preceded by: Party established
- Succeeded by: Party dissolved

Personal details
- Born: Alejandro Celestino Toledo Manrique; 28 March 1946 (age 80) Cabana, Peru
- Party: Possible Peru (1994–2017)
- Spouse: Eliane Karp
- Education: University of San Francisco (BA); Stanford University (MA, PhD)
- Profession: Economist, politician, academic

Alejandro Celestino Toledo Manrique (Note: In this name that follows Hispanic American naming customs, the first or paternal surname is Toledo and the second or maternal family name is Manrique.) (Spanish: [aleˌxandɾo selesˌtino toˌledo manˈrike]; born 28 March 1946) is a Peruvian former politician who served as President of Peru, from 2001 to 2006. He gained international prominence after leading the opposition against president Alberto Fujimori, who held the presidency from 1990 to 2000. On 21 October 2024 he was sentenced to 20 years in prison for taking $35 million in bribes to award the Brazilian company Odebrecht with a highway contract.

He pursued his undergraduate and graduate education at the University of San Francisco and Stanford University. He originally joined the technical and academic field, from where he participated as an analyst on politics and economics on some occasions. He entered politics when he founded the Possible Peru party, participating for the first time in the 1995 Peruvian general election. In 2000, he managed to become the largest opposition leader to the government of Alberto Fujimori, before whom in the midst of a controversial and bumpy process, lost the election for a second time. After a transition stage, he participated for the third time in the 2001 Peruvian general election against Lourdes Flores of National Unity and Alan García of the Peruvian Aprista Party; he competed with the latter in the second round, winning with 53.1% of the popular vote.

His administration was characterized by macroeconomic boom, promoting foreign investment, the signing of free trade agreements, and the implementation of various investment projects in infrastructure and human development. At the same time, Toledo suffered a governance crisis, scandals in his personal life, and allegations of corruption against his inner circle, signs that hit his popularity until he fell to 8% of popular approval. Subsequently, he would try to regain the presidency in the 2011 Peruvian general election, placing fourth. He later placed eighth in the 2016 Peruvian general election.

Following his presidency, he served as a distinguished resident member of the Center for Advanced Study and Behavioral Sciences at Stanford University, and as visiting professor at the Center for Democracy, Development and Law Enforcement at the Freeman Spogli Institute. Toledo has been a speaker at conferences in different countries on economics, social inclusion, and democracy, as well as a leader of his political party, the defunct Possible Peru. In 2006, he founded the Global Center for Development and Democracy, an organization advocating sustainable democracies, and between 2009 and 2010 he was a visiting professor at the Paul H. Nitze School of Advanced International Studies at Johns Hopkins University, and as professor of Foreign Policy at the Brookings Institution.

On 16 July 2019, Toledo was arrested in the United States for an extradition order to Peru, as reported by the Peruvian Public Ministry. On 8 August, attorney Graham Archer, requested a request for release on bail before judge Thomas Hixson. On 12 September, the judge ruled his request for reconsideration inadmissible. On 19 March 2020, he was released on bail. On 28 September 2021, a U.S. District Court approved the extradition of Toledo, ruling that evidence presented in the case against Toledo were "sufficient to sustain the charges of collusion and money laundering" under the U.S. Peru Extradition Treaty. On 23 April 2023, Toledo was extradited from the US to Peru.

== Early life ==
Toledo was born into an impoverished peasant Quechuan family. He was the eighth oldest of sixteen brothers and sisters, seven of whom died in childhood. He was born in the village of Ferrer, Bolognesi, but registered in the nearby town of Cabana, Pallasca Province, Ancash Department.

The family moved to Chimbote when Toledo was six years old. As a child he worked shining shoes and selling newspapers and lottery tickets. At age 11, Toledo finished grade school, his father expected him to leave school and get a job to support the family. With his teacher's encouragement, Toledo was able to continue his schooling by working nights and weekends, becoming the first person in his family to attend high school. Toledo eventually found employment as a news correspondent for La Prensa in Chimbote, where he interviewed several high-ranking politicians.

Toledo's prospects improved when two Peace Corps volunteers, Joel Meister and Nancy Deeds, arrived in Chimbote looking for lodging and arrived at his family's door. The two Americans were drawn to Toledo by his "industriousness and charm," and his long conversations with them during the year that followed introduced Toledo to a world outside his small fishing village and inspired him to apply for a local civic group's scholarship to study in the United States. He was chosen to receive a one-year grant, and while in the United States, Deeds and Meister helped him get into the University of San Francisco's special program for non-English speakers.

Toledo received a BA degree in economics and business administration at University of San Francisco by obtaining a partial scholarship and working part-time pumping gas. Starting in 1970 he attended Stanford University, where he received a MA in education and a M.A. in Economics of Human Resources and, in 1993, a PhD in human resources from the graduate school of education.

== Early career ==
From 1981 to 1983, Toledo directed the Institute for Economic and Labor Studies in Lima, a subdivision of the Ministry of Labor and Social Development. During the same period, he also served as chairman of the Economic Advisory Committee to the president of the Central Reserve Bank and the labor minister.

Throughout his academic and governmental career, Toledo worked as a consultant for various international organizations, including the United Nations, the World Bank, the Inter-American Development Bank, the International Labour Organization (ILO), and the Organisation for Economic Co-operation and Development (OECD). He led the 1989 UNDP/ILO mission for the evaluation of: "Impact of Macroeconomic Policies on Growth, Employment and Salaries", in six Central American countries.

Toledo has also been a full time professor at ESAN Graduate School of Business, one of Peru's leading business schools, serving as its Director since 1986 to 1991 and remains in ESAN University as licensed professor. From 1991 to 1994, he was an affiliated researcher in the field of international development at the Harvard Institute for International Development. He has also been a guest professor at the University of Waseda in Tokyo and at the Japan Foundation.

== Presidential election ==
Toledo entered politics as an independent candidate for the presidency (winning 3% of the vote) in the 1995 election in which Alberto Fujimori was ultimately re-elected. Despite his loss, the party he founded in 1994, Perú Posible, gained popularity and influence over the next few years. Toledo declared his intent to run again in the 2000 election and despite a constitutional controversy about his eligibility to serve a third term, Fujimori also announced his candidacy.

Despite being a relatively low-profile politician, Toledo suddenly found himself the leader of the opposition to Fujimori's presidency. Toledo promised to uphold and strengthen the market program that had been put in place, while also mitigating inequality issues attributed to it. He promised to pursue democratic reforms and reinvigorate Peru's social infrastructure. During the campaign, he promised to raise the wages of civil servants, which had been stagnant under Fujimori, and to create 400,000 jobs a year through programs designed to encourage agriculture, tourism, and small business. Toledo repeatedly called for the expansion of investigations into government, including investigations into allegations that the Fujimori administration had stolen billions from government coffers.

Racial-ethnic themes also echoed throughout the campaign. Toledo was running to become Peru's first indigenous president. He referred to himself as El Cholo throughout his campaign, and many indigenous Peruvians hoped that as president he would bring greater attention to issues of importance to them. Toledo's background, engaging manner, and informal attitude made him an attractive candidate to both indigenous and non-indigenous Peruvians.

Just minutes after the polls closed at 4:00 pm on 9 April 2000, major news networks rushed to announce that Toledo had garnered more votes than Fujimori. These announcements were based on projections from Peru's top polling firms, which base their numbers on exit polls. The prominent pollsters quickly modified projections based on samples of actual vote counts from selected polling places, better known as the "quick count". Shortly after receiving news of Toledo's encouraging performance in the initial stage of the vote count, supporters gathered in the streets around Toledo's hotel room. An enthusiastic Toledo walked out onto the balcony of his room wearing a red headband, reminiscent of ancient Inca warriors. He optimistically speculated that a first round victory might be within his grasp but still urged his supporters to wait for the results of the quick count. The second wave of quick count results reversed earlier projections, projecting a round one Fujimori plurality and possible majority. Fujimori had a projected lead of 48.73% to 41.03% later that evening. Fujimori was closing in on the 50% mark which would give him a victory in the first round, with no runoff necessary.

Allegations of electoral fraud were made, and were not far-fetched. On the day preceding the election, Transparencia, the national election observation organization, reported that it had received information concerning a website with capabilities to hack into the ONPE (Oficina Nacional de Procesos Electorales) computer system. Eduardo Stein also claimed that ONPE had made no provisions for OAS technicians to monitor the vote count system in real time. Toledo claimed that a fraud had been perpetrated; other opposition candidates agreed and joined protests led by Toledo. Though "the U.S. State Department had supported Fujimori and his economic policies, it described the results of the 2000 elections as "invalid". Since no candidate had received a majority of the vote, a runoff was required, but Toledo refused to participate in a second round against Fujimori and withdrew from the race on 26 May 2000, two days before the runoff. He unsuccessfully petitioned to have the election annulled, and lobbied international organizations and foreign government to deny recognition to Fujimori's government.

On 28 July 2000, Peruvian Independence Day, Fujimori began his third term as president. Toledo led a group of protesters towards Congress. The massive demonstration was peaceful at first, but violence broke out and a powerful explosion led to the death of six people. It was later discovered by the Peruvian judiciary that the explosion had been planned and carried out by the National Intelligence Service, run by Vladimiro Montesinos, who had already been indicted on corruption and bribery charges. Montesinos fled to Venezuela, where he hid for several months before being captured and brought back to Peru. The charges against Montesinos ranged from bribery to drug trafficking to arranging death squads. But it was the release of the "Vladi-videos" that prompted retreat by Fujimori. The first of these incriminating videos showed Montesinos bribing a congressman with US$15,000 to switch to Fujimori's camp.

In November 2000, amid growing allegations of fraud and corruption within his administration, Fujimori agreed to hold new elections in 2001, and not to stand as a candidate. While he was attending the APEC forum in Brunei, Fujimori's party lost control of the Congress. Fujimori then flew to Japan, where he submitted his resignation and claimed Japanese citizenship.

After the fall of Fujimori, the newly elected president of the Peruvian Congress, Valentín Paniagua, became interim president and oversaw the already planned new elections on 29 May 2001. Toledo won after a close run-off election against former President Alan García of the APRA party, with 52.23% of the vote, to Garcia's 47.77%. Toledo thereby became the first South American president of indigenous descent to be democratically elected in five hundred years.

== Presidency (2001–2006) ==
=== High expectations ===
During his campaign, Toledo promised Peruvians higher wages, a fight against poverty, anti-corruption measures, higher pensions, more employment, military reform, development of tourism, and industrialization. As Pedro Pablo Kuczynski noted "Toledo comes after almost 30 years of either dictatorships or governments that weren't so democratic. People expect Toledo to solve all the problems of the last 30 years, which included an enormous increase in relative poverty." Toledo's inability to fulfill many of these promises created widespread dissatisfaction. His approval ratings were consistently low throughout his presidency, sometimes sinking into single digits.

Toledo also promised open market free trade reforms, which reflected Peru's business interests while also promising to review Fujimori's privatization programs. Specifically, Toledo promised not to privatize any of Peru's public utilities. This promise, combined with lofty promises of reduced unemployment and poverty, caused Peru's rank and file to set the bar very high for his administration. Shortly after coming to office Toledo met with IMF officials and promised that he would raise $700 million in 2002, and almost $1 billion in 2003, by selling state assets.

To compound his problems, President Toledo faced a devastating earthquake in his first year in office. This natural disaster left much of Peru morally and fiscally devastated. With many homes and businesses destroyed, economic ills were exacerbated.

=== National Accord ===
In November 2001, Toledo opened talks which concluded in the National Accord of 22 July 2002. In the accord, seven political parties and seven social organizations agreed upon a framework that would guide policy for the next twenty years. The accord set forth twenty-four policy goals divided into four categories: democracy and the rule of law, equity and social justice, economic competitiveness, and an institutional framework of efficiency, transparency, and decentralization. Initially, the accord opened up dialogue in Peru's political arena, but within a year, the public considered it to be less effective than had been hoped.

=== Indigenous issues ===
Touting his heritage throughout his campaign, Toledo continued the efforts begun by Paniagua, who had brought together experts and indigenous leaders to discuss the needs of indigenous people throughout the country. Toledo's inauguration ceremony on Machu Picchu was attended by all the presidents of the neighboring Andean states who joined him in signing the "Declaration of Machu Picchu," promising to protect indigenous rights.

Maria Elena García calls the years of Toledo's presidency a transition ripe with new opportunities for indigenous people, noting the "reframed state-indigenous interactions", "increase in NGO projects and social movements", and "proliferation of indigenous organizations." Toledo created and first lady Eliane Karp headed a new agency for indigenous and Afro-Peruvian affairs, CONOPA (Commission for Amazonian, Andean, and Afro-Peruvian Peoples). The agency was meant to establish a development agenda for indigenous communities, provide representation of indigenous interests within the government, and lead the way for multicultural constitutional reforms. Some critics viewed these actions as a state co-optation of indigenous identity, mockingly dubbing the agency the "Karp Commission". However, Oxfam's Martin Scurrah points out the agency's good work, noting that in addition to promoting a chapter on indigenous rights in the new constitution, Eliane Karp has "intervened on numerous occasions in support of or in defense of indigenous initiatives."

As president, Toledo made it a priority to try to recover ancient Incan artifacts from Yale University's Peabody Museum of Natural History. Some art historians claimed that such artifacts, found at Machu Picchu, could help the Peruvian people to gain knowledge of their ancestry.

He also brought serious attention to bilingual education in indigenous schools, creating a new and well-staffed division within the Ministry of Education devoted to the issue. This effort gives advocates greater autonomy and opportunity to influence policy and work toward institutionalizing bilingual education.

Toledo's efforts at decentralization sought to give indigenous groups greater influence upon policy-making on a regional level. The first regional and local elections, held in November 2002, required that 15% of the candidates in regions with an indigenous presence must have indigenous backgrounds. However, decentralization has been viewed critically by some, who claim that in dividing up regions, administrators have at times ignored the distinctive cultural and historical factors that define different areas.

In a speech to the Human Rights of Indigenous Peoples in Latin America conference, Toledo expressed disappointment at the growing disparity between the incomes of indigenous people and other citizens. Despite the growth achieved by the Peruvian economy, the poverty gap has widened between the upper and lower classes. Toledo mentions the reintegration of the indigenous populations into the Peruvian social and political system as a key to sustainability and economic growth.

Advocates of indigenous rights have also criticized some of Toledo's efforts to jump-start the economy through investments, such as his support for the Camisea natural gas project and other projects that involved exploring or developing natural resources. These critics claim that companies buy land at unreasonable prices, force indigenous people off of land that is historically theirs, and exploit natural resources in ways that are harmful to communities and the environment. Peru is one of the largest producers of gold, silver, and zinc in Latin America, and some critics complain about the priority the Peruvian government gives to mining as opposed to industries like fishing and agriculture, with which indigenous peoples are more familiar. They note that mining companies may bring new jobs to rural areas, but that they are not jobs for which natives are well qualified.

=== Labor unrest ===
Despite unprecedented, strong, and consistent economic growth under his leadership, Toledo dealt with much labor unrest during his presidency as workers demanded higher wages and the fulfillment of campaign promises. The crisis underlined a basic flaw in Peru's economy as pointed out by The Economist, which noted that "some 70% of output falls within the grey or informal" economy, and thus escapes tax. Tax-collections, at below 12.1% of GDP, are stagnant, with most coming from a handful of large, formal companies. Evasion is widespread, particularly among better-paid independent professionals." Tax collections by Toledo's government could simply not cover the wages that had been promised to civil servants.

Even as the Peruvian government was taking in too little money to pay civil servants, the country saw its cost of living increase dramatically during the early years of Toledo's administration. These hardships, combined with increasing unemployment and stagnant wages caused the general public to doubt that Toledo was living up to lofty campaign promises. By 2003, Toledo's approval rating had fallen below 10%, the lowest of any South American president at the time.

=== Social initiatives ===
Toledo did implement some of his plans for investment in social infrastructure and institutions. The amount of paved roads increased by 20% during his presidency; medical attention to the poor doubled in rural areas, and public sector salaries increased (school teachers' pay rose by 87%) and over 100,000 new homes were built for poor Peruvians.

By 2004, Peru had a far-reaching social safety net that included food programs serving 35 percent of the population, and work programs offering temporary employment to unskilled workers. The Cooperative Fund for Social Development funded projects to construct and improve schools, health clinics, rural roads, water and sanitation systems, and electric grids. Toledo placed food and infrastructure programs under the Ministry for Women and Social Development and urged that municipalities implement decentralization. Social safety-net spending in Peru remained well below the Latin American average under Toledo even as it covered a larger percentage of the population, which means that outlays were insufficient to lift many people up out of poverty.

==== Education ====
Toledo inherited an educational system which had been plagued for decades by mediocrity, low completion rates, inadequate resources, and inequality between genders, classes, and races. Toledo launched Project Huascaran, which enabled primary and secondary-school classrooms to connect a nationwide computer network of learning systems. During his campaign, Toledo had promised to double teachers’ salaries, but ran into problems when the teachers unions successfully opposed an initiative to tie salary increases to improved skills and performance standards. In 2002, Toledo declared an emergency in education, stating four objectives to respond to it:

- Reverse the deterioration in quality of education
- Give priority to basic education
- emphasize teacher training and performance
- evaluate and upgrade schools

Throughout his administration, enrollment rates in primary and secondary education remained high and private-school enrollment increased, but overall literacy and test scores improved only slightly. In an interview on his last day in office, Toledo expressed frustration that his administration had not done more to improve education.

==== Healthcare ====
During his first year in office, Toledo replaced previous health-insurance programs aimed at the poor with a more comprehensive free insurance program, Seguro Integral de Salud (SIS). The program aimed to provide Peruvians without health insurance with improved access to health care. By the end of his term, SIS covered more than 11 million Peruvians living on the outskirts of cities or in rural areas. However, about a third of the country remained without health coverage.

The program has been immensely popular. President García expanded the program, which has been praised by neoliberal reformers for extending coverage to indigenous people and women. They also note that it has addressed with considerable success the fact that Peruvian women's healthcare costs are much higher than men's owing to higher rates of illness and reproductive issues. The legislature continues to build upon SIS, using it as a basis for what many hope will someday be universal healthcare coverage for all Peruvians.

Toledo also attempted to improve access to healthcare in the most remote places. His Juntos program awarded a monthly benefit to poor families who agreed to get vaccinations and screenings, attend school, and obtain birth registration documents. The Toledo administration also provided financial incentives to young doctors who were willing to spend the first few years of their practices in remote areas.

==== Housing ====
Peru faced a major housing deficit in 2001, with the majority of its urban population living in slums. Toledo's administration sought to improve access to affordable housing through subsidies, loans, down payments, land titling, and encouraging financial institutions to reach further down-market. Most of these efforts were grouped under the Fondo Mivivienda, which was a program started in 1999.

=== Decentralization ===
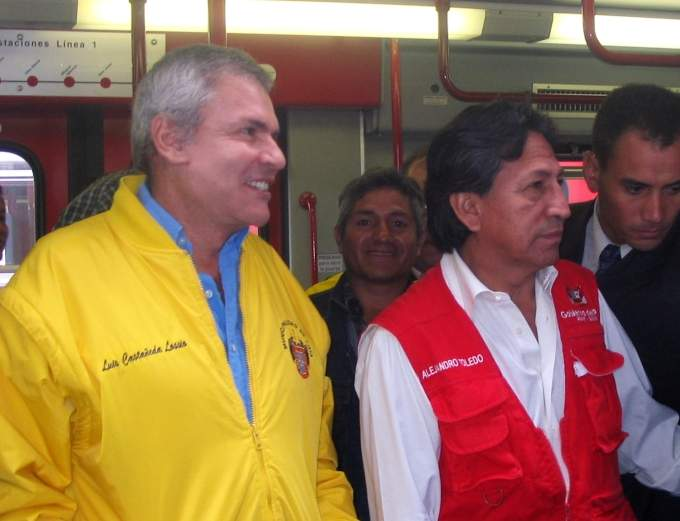
President Toledo with Lima mayor Luis Castañeda Lossio

Under Toledo's predecessor, Fujimori, the governing authority in Peru was condensed and centralized. A Fujimori-dominated congress passed a new constitution in 1993, which consolidated the bicameral legislature into a unicameral legislature with a single national district. Under Fujimori local governments retained minimal legal authority including fees for utilities, basic civil registries, and management of public spaces and markets.

Decentralization was among Toledo's most successful institutional reforms. In addition to announcing regional elections upon his inauguration, he charged a Decentralization and Regionalization Commission with developing proposals. In 2002, a constitutional amendment was approved which established three levels of government: local, regional, and national. Over the next few years, the congress gradually passed on resources and responsibilities to the regional and municipal governments including food programs, social development projects, and health and education programs. He divided the single district up, called for regional elections, and eliminated the centralist Ministry of the Presidency that had been instituted under Fujimori. However, when Peru Possible's rival political party APRA made significant gains in regional elections, the Toledo administration halted its decentralization program by withholding power in the areas of revenue and expenditure. This left many regionally elected governors confused as to how far their authority extended. Without strong fiscal plans to support his new policy of centralization, Toledo had to continue decentralizing power and recognizing more regions. Toledo continued to assert control of regional governments, however, by withholding funding.

Toledo's plan for decentralization enjoyed widespread popular support. Most of the opposition to his program came from, and most of the difficulty in implementing his proposals was owing to, politicians and bureaucratic agencies who were accustomed to a centralized form of government.

=== Fighting terrorism and drug trafficking ===
The Truth and Reconciliation Commission, which had been implemented by interim president Paniagua, was tasked with examining largescale acts of violence and atrocities committed within Peru between 1980 and 2000, to assess responsibility and pave the way for reparations. The commission's final report to President Toledo was issued in 2003, and concluded that approximately 69,000 people had been killed by the Shining Path and other extremist groups, the bulk of the victims being innocent peasants. In January of that year, the Constitutional Court repealed several anti-terrorism measures enacted during Fujimori's administration. It was estimated that 54% of these victims were killed by the extremist guerrilla group Shining Path, 30% by the Peruvian Military and police forces, and the rest were by rural or peasant self-defense militias. These investigations were financed by a portion of the US$360 million discovered in foreign accounts which had been stolen by Fujimori officials. Toledo wasted no time in pursuing suspected terrorists, arresting 199 of them in 2002 alone.

In late 2001, the Directorate against Terrorism reported that the Shining Path, a terrorist movement which has been active since the eighties, was organizing along new fronts and infiltrating protests, blocking highways, and organizing student marches. The government reacted by reestablishing five counterinsurgency bases, which soon assisted in destroying six Shining Path camps. But terrorist activity continued and in 2003, Toledo declared the first of several states of emergency due to the terrorist threat.

Toledo walked a thin line in responding to both U.S. pressure to severely limit coca-production and protests by coca farmers against the eradication of coca production in poor, rural areas, where the majority of the population is involved in that business. The presumed link between the Shining Path and narcotics trafficking was unclear, because the coca farmers gave most of their crops to drug traffickers who then paid the Shining Path to operate within certain regions.

Recognizing the drug trade as a threat to regional security, Toledo sought to create a common Andean approach to the drug war. He saw that revenue from drug trafficking funded terrorist activities, but also that U.S. insistence on the eradication of coca crops failed to address the problem. Alternative crop programs were also being resisted by coca farmers who depended on the coca trade for their livelihood. At a meeting of the 19-member Rio group in May 2003, Toledo proposed developing a joint strategy to deal with drug trafficking, but pressure from Washington, which preferred bilateral efforts, helped kill the notion.

=== Foreign relations ===
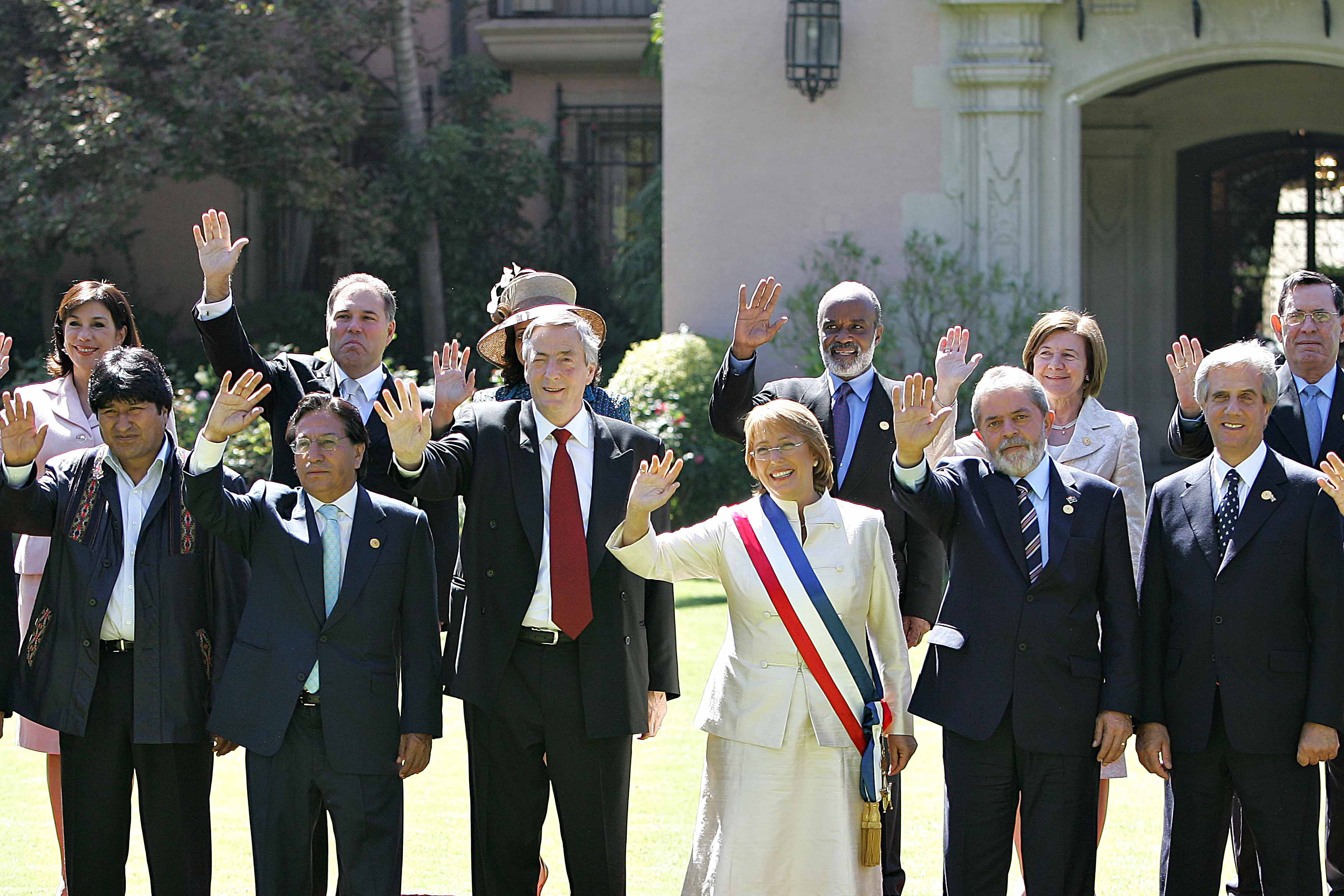
Toledo in Valparaíso, Chile

The Toledo administration was unusually active in foreign policy. Its major goals were promoting democracy outside Peru, addressing the struggle against poverty, encouraging economic development in the borderlands, reducing arms spending in the region, strengthening relations with Asia-Pacific countries, and integrating with the Andean Community of Nations. Peru also became an associate member of MERCOSUR, a free trade zone that would be established gradually. The objective was for signing nations to gradually build up an infrastructure that would ease trade with one another, to cooperate in the improvement of energy efficiency, and to commit to future agreements that would increase cross border investment by eliminating double taxation.

==== Asia ====
The Toledo administration held free trade agreement talks with Singapore and Thailand, came to an agreement with Thailand on air transport, and signed an extradition treaty with South Korea. Foreign Minister García-Sayan visited China and discussed support for multilateralism and strengthening the UN. In 2004 China declared Peru an official tourist destination, and in 2005 the countries concluded several trade agreements.

==== Bolivia ====
Toledo attended Evo Morales' inauguration in 2006, indicating a willingness to work with his administration, but Morales joined his mentor, Hugo Chávez, in repeatedly making offensive comments about Toledo and his government, especially after the successful conclusion of Peru's free trade agreement with the U.S., which soured official relations with Colombia.

==== Brazil ====
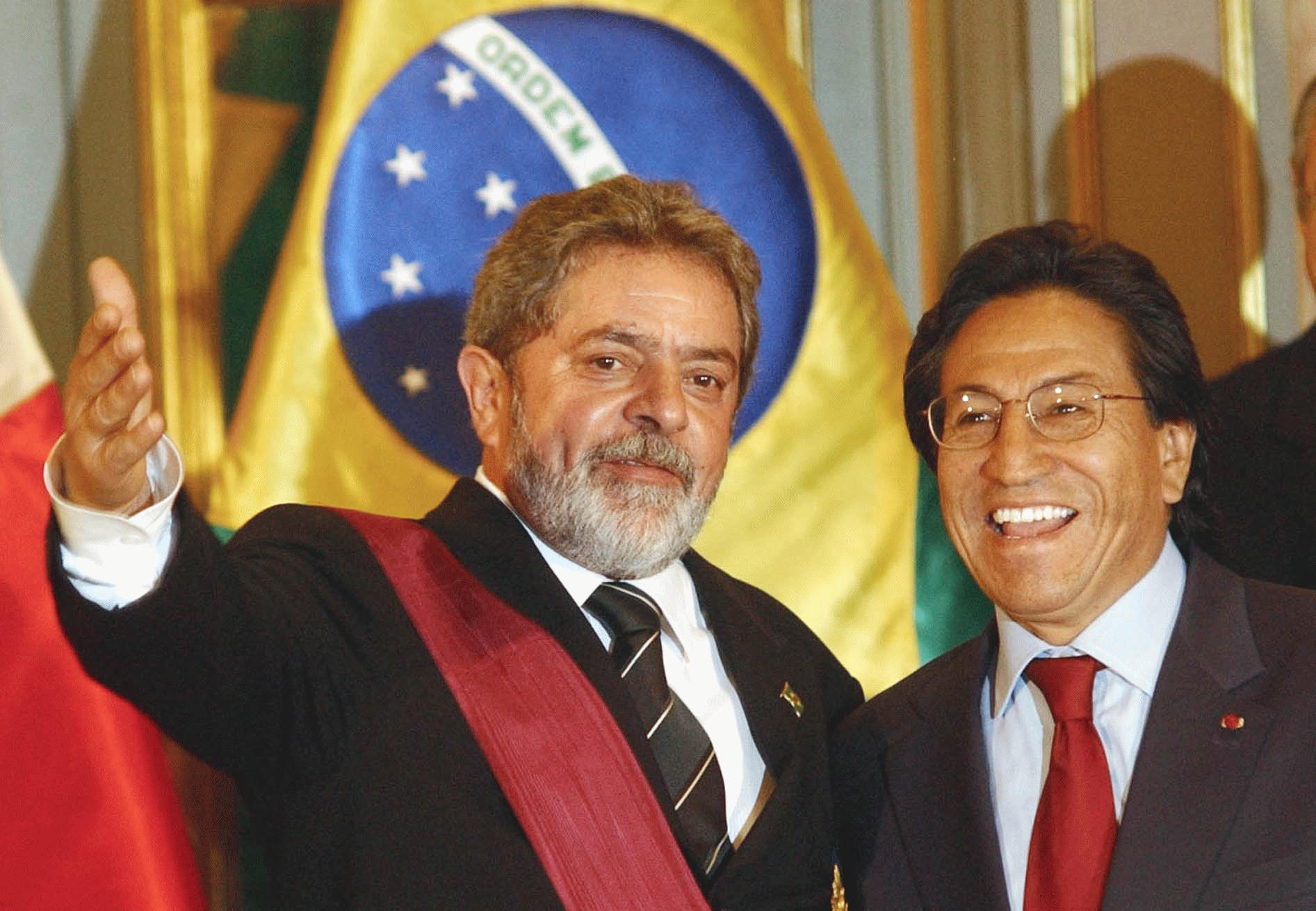
Toledo and Brazil's President Lula da Silva.

In conducting Peru's relations with Brazil, Toledo's goal was to reorient Peru from the Andean Community, toward the more economically active Brazil and MERCOSUR. In August 2003, Toledo met with former Brazilian president Lula. They committed to increased political and economic cooperation under the Initiative for Integration of Regional Infrastructure in South America which invests in large-scale, debt-heavy projects, aimed at developing 10 economic axes or hubs throughout South America. Construction projects, including roads, discussed. President Lula also agreed to allow Peru access to two surveillance systems which Brazil had developed in the Amazon Basin to target legal and illegal activity.

==== Colombia ====
Concern for security and trafficking led the Toledo administration to prioritize the reinforcement of its border with Colombia and the improvement of police coordination. In 2003, with increased private and UN investment in the area, the two countries agreed to establish an integrated frontier zone which treats air travel between border cities as domestic travel and simplifies customs and tariff procedures.

==== Chile ====
Most of the Toledo administration's dealings with Chile involved concern over the latters procurement of arms. Despite Toledo's repeated call for regional arms reductions, Chile continued purchasing arms, including 10 F-16 fighters from the U.S. and one hundred Leopard 2 tanks from Germany.

==== Ecuador ====
While Peru and Ecuador had been at peace for years, President Toledo worked to solidify and build upon that peace. During a 2001 visit to Ecuador, Toledo expressed support for the Brasília Accords, agreed to the demilitarization of the two countries' common border, advocated reduced military spending, and agreed to greater energy, transportation, and police cooperation. Toledo joined Ecuadorian President Noboa at the International Advisory Committee of the Binational Development Plan, where they called for greater investment in their region, with Toledo putting forth a detailed program for international assistance. Economic activity in the region subsequently improved as the demining of the border continued, construction projects were completed, and military forces were reduced. By 2006, investment in the area had reached $1.2 billion.

==== Venezuela ====
Relations with Venezuela deteriorated during the latter half of the Toledo presidency owing to opposing philosophies and policies of presidents Toledo and Chávez. The issues contributing to the tension between the two countries included Venezuela's alleged shielding of Vladimiro Montesinos, and Venezuelan interference in Peruvian politics. (157) This included Chávez's official endorsement, and unofficial financial backing of leftist candidate Ollanta Humala in Peru's 2006 presidential race, which was soon seconded by President Morales.

==== United States ====
President Toledo worked hard throughout his presidency on what became a very productive relationship with the U.S., and what Toledo described as a personal friendship with President Bush. He received lavish praise from the American president for his economic and domestic security policies. During a visit to Peru, Bush announced the establishment of an Andean Center of Excellence for Teacher Training, with a base in Peru, and a fellowship program to give Andean professionals access to education in information technology. In June 2002, the U.S. agreed to forgive $14 million of Peru's debt in exchange for a promise to invest $12 million in conservation projects. In September, Toledo secured a $300 million commitment from Bush to fund alternative-crop development in coca-producing areas. In 2003, the Peace Corps returned to Peru. Peru opposed U.S. efforts most visibly in the War in Iraq, refusing to support the intervention in any international arena.

===== Peru – United States Trade Promotion Agreement =====
The United States – Peru Trade Promotion Agreement (Spanish: Tratado de Libre Comercio Perú – Estados Unidos) is a bilateral free trade agreement, whose objectives are eliminating obstacles to trade, consolidating access to goods and services and fostering private investment in and between the United States and Peru. Besides commercial issues, it incorporates economic, institutional, intellectual property, labor and environmental policies, among others. The agreement was signed on 12 April 2006; ratified by the Peruvian Congress on 28 June 2006; by the U.S. House of Representatives on 2 November 2007, and by the U.S. Senate on 4 December 2007. The agreement was implemented on 1 February 2009.

Peru looks to the agreement are to:

- Consolidate and extend the trade preferences under ATPDEA
- Attract foreign investment
- Generate employment
- Enhance the country's competitiveness within the region
- Increase workers' income
- Curb poverty levels
- Create and export sugar cane ethanol

The United States looks to the agreement to:

- Improve access to goods and services
- Strengthen its investments
- Promote security and democracy
- Fight against drug trafficking

The U.S.-Peru agreement has faced criticism. In Peru, the treaty was championed by Toledo, and supported to different extents by former President Alan García and candidates Lourdes Flores and Valentín Paniagua. Current President Ollanta Humala has been its most vocal critic. Humala's Union for Peru won 45 of 120 seats in Congress in 2006, the largest share by a single party, prompting debate on ratification of the agreement before the new legislature was sworn in. Some Congressmen-elect interrupted the debate after forcibly entering Congress in an attempt to stop the agreement ratification.

One controversial element of the agreement relates to land resources. Laura Carlsen, of the Center for International Policy, who is also a contributor to Foreign Policy in Focus notes that "Indigenous organizations warn that this ruling effectively opens up 45 million hectares to foreign investment and timber, oil, and mining exploitation."

However, most of the criticism of the agreement has focused on its potential impact on Peru's agricultural sector. By planting crops to similar to those subsidized by the U.S., Peru faced a competitive disadvantage in the production of agricultural products because poor farming families with inadequate tools, technology and techniques may not be able to produce crops at low enough prices to export. In response to these concerns, Peruvian lawmakers created a Compensation Fund which directed $34 million per year to cotton, maize/corn, and wheat producers for a five-year period to help them adjust to the new competitive pressures.

=== Economic policy ===
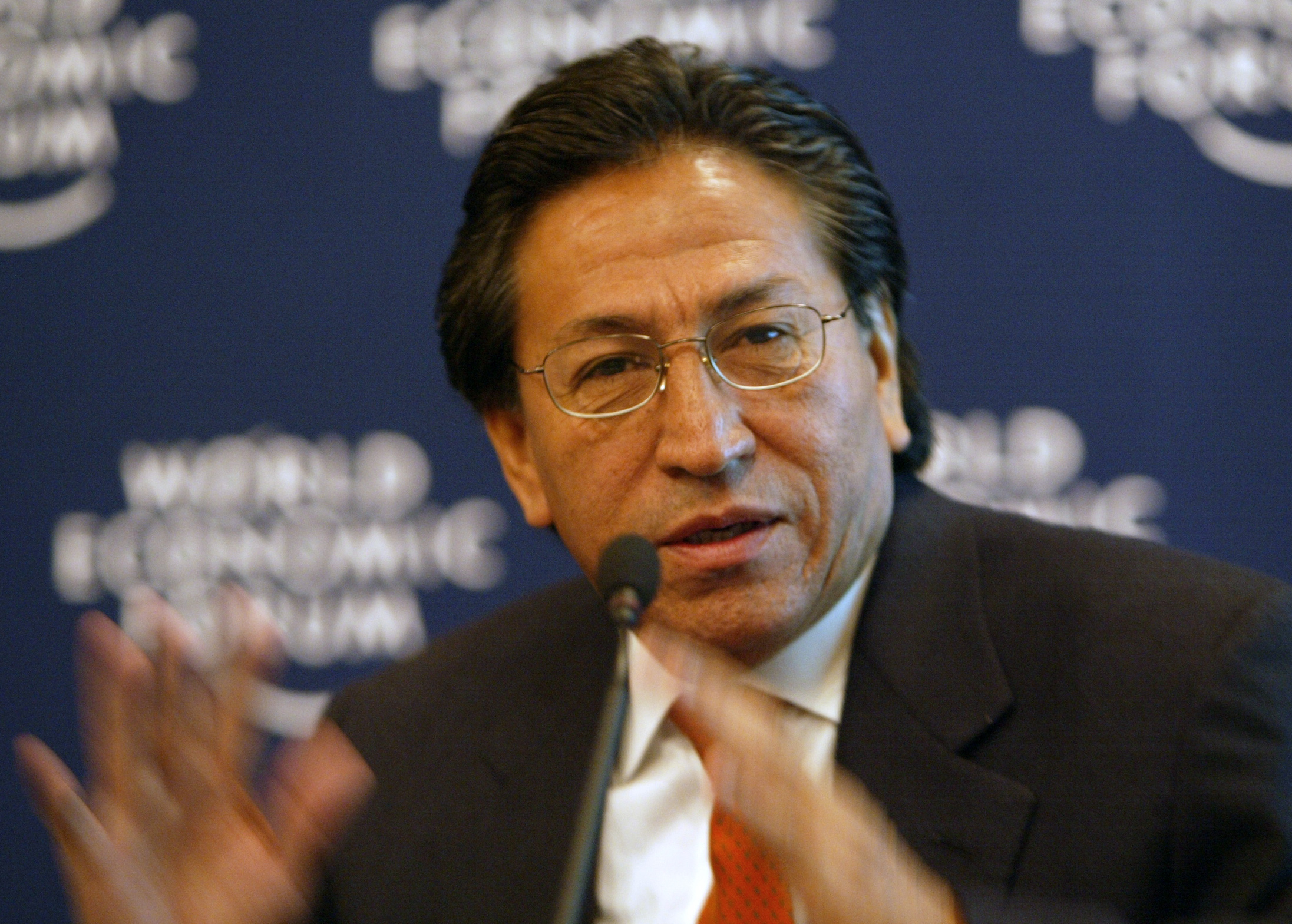
Toledo speaks in Davos, 21 January 2003.

Toledo's economic policies can be described as neoliberal or strongly pro free-trade. He inherited a national economy which in the previous decade had experienced an unstable GDP with periods of growth and shrinkage, as well as fiscal deficits frequently amounting to over 2% of GDP. Inflation had not dropped below 23% until 1995 and was still feared by many. In response, Toledo developed policies which focused on fighting poverty, generating employment, decentralizing government, and modernizing the state.

Among Toledo's initiatives designed to generate revenue and transform the economy were plans to privatize national industries. The first major effort of this kind was the $167 million sale of two state-owned electric companies. Protests in the city of Arequipa turned violent as Peruvians reacted with anger to the prospect of layoffs and higher priced electricity. They also recalled that billions of dollars earned from privatization under the Fujimori administration had ended up filling the president's personal bank accounts. Toledo decided not to carry out the sale of electric companies, but promised to continue privatization efforts, which were a key provision of a deal struck with the International Monetary Fund. Toledo had promised to bring in US$700 million through privatization in 2001 and US$1 billion in 2002. Although he failed to meet these goals, the IMF approved a $154 million disbursement to Peru in December 2002 and allowed the country to raise the fiscal deficit target in its agreement.

Although Toledo originally promised tax cuts, violent protests by civil servants prompted the increase in social sector spending that Toledo had also promised, which necessitated tax increases. To tackle tax reform in June 2003, he brought in Peru's first female prime minister, Beatriz Merino who quickly submitted proposals to the congress. Among the suggestions were pay cuts for higher-paid public-sector officials, including a 30% salary reduction for Toledo himself, a 5% across-the-board cut for all agencies and ministries, tax increases on beer, cigarettes and fuel, and an extension of the 18% sales and value-added tax to, among other things, long-distance bus journeys and live entertainment. The final package also included the elimination of tax breaks, the introduction of a minimum corporate tax, the closing of tax loopholes for the rich, and the strengthening of local government realestate tax regimes.

During Toledo's five years as president, Peru's economy experienced 47 consecutive months of growth and grew at an average rate of 6% per year while inflation averaged 1.5% and the deficit sank as low as 0.2% of GDP. Between 2004 and 2006, employment grew at an average rate of 6%, the percentage of people living in poverty fell, and food consumption by the poorest segments of the population rose dramatically. Much of this growth has been credited to the free trade agreements signed with the United States, China, Thailand, Chile, Mexico, and Singapore.

In an attempt to increase remittances from Peruvians abroad, the Ministry of Foreign Affairs under Toledo sought to strengthen the link between Peruvian migrants and their homeland through the creation of advisory councils. The issue is especially important for a country which experienced a massive emigration of professionals under Fujimori and which still has 10% of its population living abroad. The councils were also part of an effort by the first Minister of Foreign Affairs, García Sayan, to professionalize the foreign service.

== Post-presidency (2006–present) ==
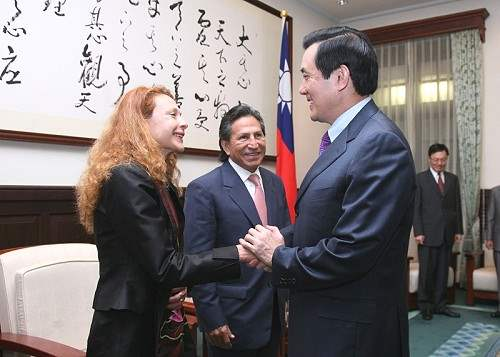
Toledo, with his wife Eliane Karp on a visit to Taiwan, meeting Ma Ying-jeou, then President of Taiwan (2008)

Toledo was unable to run for reelection in 2006; after he took office, the constitution was amended to restore the pre-1995 ban on immediate reelection. After his presidency, Toledo went to the United States, where he served as a Distinguished Scholar in Residence at the Center for Advanced Study in the Behavioral Sciences at Stanford University, during the 2006–2008 academic years. Toledo was named a Distinguished Visiting Fellow at the Hoover Institution at Stanford University from 2006 to 2009, and in 2007–2008 was a Payne Distinguished Visiting Lecturer at Stanford University's Freeman Spogli Institute for International Studies and a CDDRL (Center on Democracy, Development and the Rule of Law) Visiting Scholar. While at Stanford, Toledo founded and continues to serve as the president of the Global Center for Development and Democracy, based in Latin America, the United States, and the European Union which 'aims to help Peru and Latin American countries build institutional bases for greater stability, with a wide political commitment to democracy, that is decentralized and equal to all".

In 2007, following the closing of media outlet RCTV in Venezuela, Toledo published an op-ed in The New York Times condemning the action of President Hugo Chávez's government as a violation of free speech. Toledo called for intervention by the Organization of American States, citing its commitment to protecting the development of democratic institutions, including the press. He also called for "continent-wide solidarity" on the grounds that the repression of free speech in a country is felt beyond the country itself. He warned that if Venezuela were allowed to silence its press without repercussions, this would encourage similar repression in the rest of Latin America, because "[w]hen one voice is silenced, we all become mute. When one thought is eliminated, we all lose some awareness. And when a space for the expression of ideas becomes closed, we all become trapped in the dungeons of dictatorship."

In 2009, Toledo joined the Brookings Institution as a nonresident senior fellow. His works on the Latin America Initiative, a joint effort of the Global Economy and Development and Foreign Policy programs at Brookings. The initiative focuses on the most critical economic, political and social issues facing the region. Research activities are concerned with a wide range of topics, including the challenges that a changing world economy poses for Latin America, the impact of organized crime on democratic institutions and economic prosperity, trade and investment policies, strategies to tackle poverty and inequality, combating climate change, and Cuba's political transition.

Toledo is also a member of the United Nations Steering Committee on the Human Development Report for Latin America, a member of the Club of Madrid, and a member of the International Board of Governors of the Peres Center for Peace in Israel.

Toledo attended the San Francisco Freedom Forum in 2011 to discuss democracy in Latin America.

Toledo created the Global Center for Development and Democracy. The center works with low income individuals in developing countries with the goal of helping them become self-sufficient entrepreneurs, along with governments and other organizations to help combat institutionalized poverty.

=== Friends of Israel Initiative ===
In 2010, Toledo joined the Spanish Prime Minister José María Aznar, Northern Irish Unionist politician David Trimble, Italian philosopher Marcello Pera, former United States Ambassador to the United Nations John Bolton, British historian Andrew Roberts, and others in forming the Friends of Israel Initiative. The project's aim is to counter efforts to delegitimize the State of Israel and its right to live in peace within safe and defensible borders. The initiative consists of non-Jewish members who want Israel to continue to be accepted as part of the western world and who recognize it as a full-fledged democracy with the right to defend itself.

In a 2011 article entitled "How Not to have a Palestinian State," Toledo and his co-writers argued that Obama's call for a return to talks based on the pre-1967 boundaries is a "clumsily concealed delegitimization device," as Palestine does not meet the internal and external requirements to become a state. The only way forward, the argued, is not unilateral action by the UN General assembly but a bilateral agreement between the Palestinians and the Israelis, in which each party agrees to recognize the other as a legitimate state.

=== 2011 Election ===
In December 2010, Toledo announced his candidacy in the 2011 presidential election. Telling the Peruvian Times that "Garcia (the incumbent) is governing for the rich and not the poor", he said that when he left office, with 1 sol (approximately $0.34) bought 10 loaves bread; now it bought you five. "President Alan García (must) realize that Peru is much greater, much deeper, more generous and more warlike than the rich friends that surround him."

The general election, which took place on 10 April 2011, Toledo won 15.62% of the vote putting him behind leftist former army officer Ollanta Humala (with 31.75%), Keiko Fujimori, daughter of the former president (with 23.5%), and Pedro Pablo Kuczynski (with 18.52%), and ahead of Luis Castaneda (with 9.84%). After the initial round, Fujimori received the support of candidate and former president Alan García, while Toledo supported Humala, calling him the lesser of two evils.

However, Toledo's support came with conditions, and he threatened to mobilize protests if Humala's presidency did not live up to Toledo's standards in terms of protecting democratic institutions, human rights, and stimulating the economy. Just before the election, an email was released revealing that the socialist president of Venezuela, Hugo Chávez, had given financial support to Humala's 2006 campaign. It also emerged that Humala's wife, Nadine Heredia, had been well-paid for consulting work at a pro-Chávez newspaper.

In the final tally, Humala won 51.6% of the vote to Fujimori's 48.4%. The day after the final vote, the Peruvian stock market plunged out of concern for the state of Peru's neo-liberal economic policies.

Drawing on his close relations with Evo Morales, President-elect Humala visited Bolivia shortly after the election and suggested the possibility of reunification of the two countries, a proposal which Toledo explicitly rejected, warning that he would not "allow Peru to become another Venezuela or Nicaragua."

Amidst worries that Humala's election represented a shift too far to the left, Peru Posible, under the leadership of Toledo, announced the month after the election that its members would not accept ministerial positions within the administration and would limit its support of Humala's government to backing on some issues in the Congress.

=== Lawsuit over corruption allegations ===
In April 2016, Toledo was summoned to court on charges of money laundering over the purchase of several properties via Ecoteva Consulting, a real estate company owned by Israeli businessman Yossi Maiman. Toledo is accused of taking bribes from the Brazilian companies Camargo Corrêa and Odebrecht for the construction of the Interoceanic Highway, and using the money to pay off personal mortgages and buy luxury real estate in the name of his mother in law. In 2015, the Swiss Financial Market Supervisory Authority said the money went from Confiado International Corp, a Panama-based company, to Costa Rica. Meanwhile, Maiman denied the allegations, comparing them to a "smear campaign".

In 2016, Odebrecht stated as part of a plea agreement that the company had paid approximately $800 million in bribes in several Latin American countries, including $29 million in Peru from 2001 to 2006, the presidencies of Toledo and his two successors, all of whom have denied the charge of receiving bribes. On 9 February 2017, a Peruvian judge ordered Toledo's arrest over allegations that he took $20m (£16m) in bribes from Odebrecht in return for awarding public works contracts, a reward was offered for his capture, and Interpol was alerted.

Toledo was arrested by US authorities in July 2019 after a formal request by Peru for his extradition. He was released on bail in 2020 and was living in California. On 20 April 2023, federal judge Beryl Howell denied his last motion to delay his extradition and ordered his arrest.

On 21 April 2023, Toledo surrendered himself to US authorities in San Mateo, California. On 23 April 2023, Toledo was extradited to Peru, where he was transferred to Peruvian police.

On 21 October 2024, Toledo was sentenced to 20 years' imprisonment by the National Superior Court of Specialized Criminal Justice for taking bribes as part of the Odebrecht case. On 3 September 2025, he was sentenced to 13 years' imprisonment in a related case.

== Relationship with the press ==
From the beginning of Toledo's presidency, the press took an aggressive stance, scrutinizing the personal and public lives of Toledo and his advisors. Many news outlets were determined to expose corruption. Others wished to prove their independence from the government. Ironically, it was Toledo's commitment to maintaining a free press that allowed these attacks to occur.

Charges of corruption, nepotism, and graft aimed at Toledo, his family, members of his administration and fellow PP members plagued his presidency. These stories led to many resignations and were the most significant reason for Toledo's low approval ratings. Those ratings bottomed out in 2004, following the resignation of his Minister of Agriculture.

== Awards and honors ==
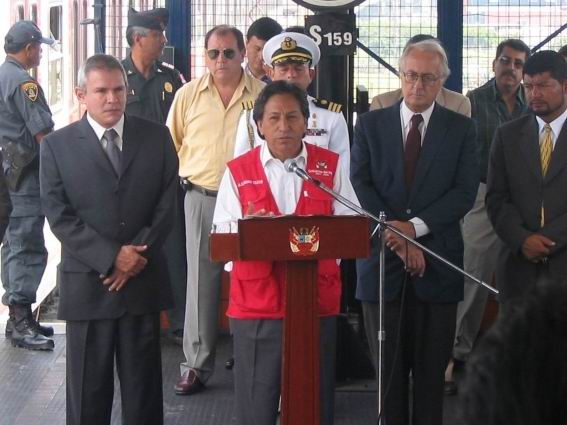
The subscribing of the convention for metro extension

On 7 May 2005, he received the Order of the Athir, one of the National Order of Merits of Algeria.

In 2006, UCSD's Institute of the Americas honored President Toledo with its Award for Democracy and Peace for his efforts in promoting economic growth and strengthening democracy. "It is the force of his personality that has led this country to understand that in this globalized world, there is no alternative to regional integration, to free trade, to sane economic policies," said Jeffrey Davidow, the institute's president.

Toledo has received honorary doctorates from University of Winnipeg, Los Andes Peruvian University, and 50 other universities around the world—for a total of 52. He has lectured in more than thirty countries on issues of poverty, economic growth, and democracy, as well as on the benefits of human-capital investment.

28 July 2011, was the tenth anniversary of Toledo's inauguration, an event catalogued in the Associated Press's "Highlights in History" for that day.

In October 2011, Tbilisi State University awarded an honorary doctorate to Toledo "for his special role in establishing and developing relations between Peru and Georgia."

Despite the largely negative press coverage of his presidency, many of Toledo's harshest critics recognize the high premium that Toledo put on democratic processes and safeguards. In recognition of his efforts to preserve the freedom of the press Enrique Zileri, President of the Peruvian Press Council, affirmed in May 2003 that there were no problems with press freedom in Peru.

Toledo received the Grand Cross of the Order of Saint-Charles from Monaco in 2003.

=== Foreign ===
- Algeria:
  - Recipient of the National Order of Merit (2005)
- Brazil:
  - Grand Collar of the Order of the Southern Cross (2003)
- Chile:
  - Collar of the Order of the Merit of Chile (2002)
- Colombia:
  - Grand Collar of the Order of Boyacá (2004)
- Ecuador:
  - Grand Cross of the National Order of San Lorenzo (2002)
- Italy:
  - Knight Grand Cross with Collar of the Order of Merit of the Italian Republic (2002)
- Jordan:
  - Grand Cordon with Brilliants of the Supreme Order of the Renaissance (2005)
- Morocco:
  - Collar of the Order of Muhammad (2004)
- Monaco:
  - Grand Cross of the Order of Saint-Charles (2003)
- Poland:
  - Grand Cross of the Order of Merit of the Republic of Poland (2002)
- Spain:
  - Collar of the Order of Isabella the Catholic (2001)

== Publications ==
Among Toledo's publications are works on economic growth and structural reforms. His latest book, Las Cartas sobre la Mesa (The Cards on the Table), recounts his political career and the founding of Perú Posible.

- Cartas Sobre la Mesa, Instituto de Investigacion para el Desarrollo, segunda edicion, 2003, Lima, Peru.
- "The Challenge of Growth and Social Investment in the 90s" (Chap. 1), Co- author in Alessandro Pio, Economic Adjustment and Social Development: Complementary or Conflict, Milan, Italy, ISLA, Instituto di Economia "Ettore Bocconi", Universidad L. Bocconi, E.G.E.A., SPA, 1992.
- The Other Faces of Informal Society (Ed. with Alain Chanlat), Lima, IDE/ESAN and HEC (Ecole de Hautes Etudes Commerciales), University of Montreal, Canada. September 1991.
- Peru and Latin America in Crisis: How to Finance Growth (editor), Instituto de Desarrollo Economico, ESAN, Lima, Peru. (Second Edition, 1990).
- Economic Stabilization and social adjustment: evaluation of the first 90 days Peru Economic Program of 1990; technical forum (editor) Lima, ESAN/IDE, December 1990.
- “Can Education Policy Equalize Income Distribution in Latin America? The cases of Brazil, Mexico and Peru” (with M. Carnoy, I. Velloso, and J. Lobo). Saxon House, England, 1979.

== Electoral history ==
Year	Office	Type	Party	Main opponent	Party	Votes for Toledo				Result	Swing
Year	Office	Type	Party	Main opponent	Party	Total	%	P.	±%	Result	Swing
1995	President of Peru	General	CODE - Possible Country	Alberto Fujimori	Change 90 - New Majority	241,598	3.24%	4th	N/A	Lost	N/A
2000	President of Peru	General	Possible Peru	Alberto Fujimori	Peru 2000	4,406,812	40.24%	2nd	N/A	N/A	N/A
2000	President of Peru	General (second round)	Possible Peru	Alberto Fujimori	Peru 2000	2,086,208	25.66%	2nd	+14.58%	Lost	N/A
2001	President of Peru	General	Possible Peru	Alan García	Peruvian Aprista Party	3,871,167	36.51%	1st	+10.85%	N/A	N/A
2001	President of Peru	General (second round)	Possible Peru	Alan García	Peruvian Aprista Party	5,548,556	53.07%	1st	+16.56%	Won	Gain
2011	President of Peru	General	Possible Peru Electoral Alliance	Ollanta Humala	Peruvian Nationalist Party	2,289,561	15.64%	4th	N/A	Lost	N/A
2016	President of Peru	General	Possible Peru	Keiko Fujimori	Popular Force	200,012	1.30%	8th	N/A	Lost	N/A

== See also ==
- Politics of Peru

== Notes ==
Party political offices
New political party	President of Possible Peru; 1994–2017	Party dissolved
New political party	Possible Peru nominee for President of Peru; 1995, 2000, 2001	Succeeded by Rafael Belaúnde Aubry
Preceded by Rafael Belaúnde Aubry	Possible Peru nominee for President of Peru; 2011, 2016	Party dissolved
New political alliance	Possible Peru Electoral Alliance nominee for President of Peru; 2011	Alliance dissolved
Political offices
Preceded by Valentín Paniagua	President of Peru; 2001–2006	Succeeded by Alan García
