= Possible Peru =

Liberal political party in Peru

Possible Peru Perú Posible
- Abbreviation: PP
- President: Alejandro Toledo
- Founder: Alejandro Toledo
- Founded: 1994 (as Possible Country)
- Dissolved: 13 July 2017
- Headquarters: Lima
- Ideology: Third Way; Social liberalism Big tent
- Political position: Centre; Factions: centre-right
- Colours: Green

Website
- www.peruposible.org.pe

Possible Peru (Spanish: Perú Posible) was a Peruvian political party. It was founded in 1994 by Alejandro Toledo with the original name of Possible Country (Spanish: País Posible).

== History ==
Possible Peru has its roots in an earlier political party, Possible Country, which was founded by the economist Alejandro Toledo in 1994. País Possible garnered 3% of the popular vote in the 1995 presidential election.

In the 2000 presidential election, Toledo ran as a candidate from Possible Peru. After coming in second to Alberto Fujimori in the initial round of voting, Toledo withdrew as a candidate and requested that his supporters cast blank ballots in the second round run-off that was to be held because both candidates failed to receive more than 50% of the vote and Fujimori was subsequently re-elected in the run-off.

After Fujimori was sworn in for his third term, Toledo led his supporters in organizing a protest against Fujimori's alleged corruption, which became popularly known as Four Suyos March, in a reference to the four suyu (district) in which the Inca Empire or Tawantin Suyu was divided. The protest turned violent, with six people being killed on 28 July inside a bank on fire. In response to growing allegations of corruption within his administration, Fujimori resigned as president in November 2000.

At the legislative elections held on 8 April 2001, the party won 26.3% of the popular vote and 45 out of 120 seats in the Congress of the Republic. Its presidential candidate at the elections of the same day, Alejandro Toledo, won 36.5% of the vote and went on to win the second round on 3 June 2001 with 53.1%.

Toledo was elected in 2001 as Fujimori's replacement, receiving 53.1% of the popular vote. Shortly after becoming president, Toledo made a strategic alliance with the Independent Moralizing Front, led by Fernando Olivera.

In 2004, Toledo was accused of falsifying some of the signatures that had been collected on his behalf in the 2000 election. Police concluded that 78% of the signatures had been falsified. Further investigation revealed that the forged signatures had been produced by Toledo's sister, who was subsequently placed under house arrest.

At the legislative elections held on 9 April 2006, the party won 4% of the popular vote and 2 out of 120 seats in Congress.

According to Daniel Mora, one of the causes that led Possible Peru to the debacle was the arrogance of Alejandro Toledo. Later, Possible Peru supported the candidacy of Pedro Pablo Kuczynski, despite the fact that Possible Peru lost the registration by failing to pass the electoral threshold. On 12 May 2016, Carmen Omonte was withdrawn from the Lavajato Commission by her own ex-party Possible Peru. At the same time, Judge Abel Concha decided to lift Alejandro Toledo's bank secrecy, this being part of the Ecoteva case trial. On 12 March 2017, Marcial Ayaipoma announced that Possible Peru will be liquidated by not passing the electoral fence, as mandated by the Law of Political Parties.

Possible Peru was dissolved in 2017 following its poor results at the 2016 general election, garnering 1.2% at national level. Toledo unsuccessfully attempted to refound the party under the name of Peruvian Chakana (Spanish: Chacana Peruana).

== 2006 elections ==
Possible Peru's presidential candidate for the 2006 election, Rafael Belaúnde Aubry, along with the vice-presidential candidates, pulled out of the race on 31 January. However, a clash with the core of the party over the inclusion of some people in the congressional candidate list led to the withdrawal of his candidature.

The previous candidate, businesswoman Jeannete Enmanuel Tejada also renounced her candidature one week after being selected following growing pressure from within certain parts of the Possible Peru party, due to her political inexperience.

Belaúnde Aubry was until recently leader of another party, Popular Action, which was founded by his father and former president, Fernando Belaúnde Terry, and was invited by Possible Peru to represent the party in the elections.

== Electoral results ==
=== Presidential elections ===
| Election | Presidential nominee | Votes | % | Votes | % | Result |
| Election | Presidential nominee | First Round | | Second Round | | Result |
|---|---|---|---|---|---|---|
| 1995 | Alejandro Toledo (as Possible Country) | 234,946 | 3.24 | | | Lost ✗ |
| 2000 | Alejandro Toledo | 4,460,812 | 40.24 | 2,086,215 | 25.67 | Lost ✗ |
| 2001 | Alejandro Toledo | 3,871,167 | 36.51 | 5,548,556 | 53.08 | Elected ✓ |
| 2006 | Rafael Belaúnde Aubry | Nomination withdrawn | N/A | | | N/A |
| 2011 | Alejandro Toledo (as part of Possible Peru Alliance) | 2,289,561 | 15.63 | | | Lost ✗ |
| 2016 | Alejandro Toledo | 200,012 | 1.30 | | | Lost ✗ |

=== Congressional elections ===
| Election | Leader | Votes | % | Seats | -/+ | Position |
|---|---|---|---|---|---|---|
| 1995 | Alejandro Toledo | 175,693 | 4.1% as Possible Country | 5 / 120 | ▲5 | Minority |
| 2000 | Alejandro Toledo | 2,308,635 | 23.2% | 29 / 120 | ▲24 | Minority |
| 2001 | Alejandro Toledo | 2,477,624 | 26.3% | 45 / 120 | ▲16 | Minority |
| 2006 | Alejandro Toledo | 441,462 | 4.1% | 2 / 130 | ▼43 | Minority |
| 2011 | Alejandro Toledo | 1,904,180 | 14.8% as part of Possible Peru Alliance. 8 from Possible Peru | 21 / 130 | ▲6 | Minority |
| 2016 | Alejandro Toledo | 286,980 | 2.4% | 0 / 130 | ▼8 | N/A |
