= Peruvian Nationalist Party =

Peruvian Nationalist Party Partido Nacionalista Peruano
- Abbreviation: PNP
- President: Ollanta Humala
- Leader: Nadine Heredia
- Founders: Ollanta Humala; Nadine Heredia
- Founded: 3 October 2005; 21 years ago
- Dissolved: 7 September 2021; 5 years ago
- Headquarters: Lima
- Youth wing: Juventud Nacionalista ("Nationalist Youth")
- Ideology: Social democracy Peruvian nationalism Third Way; Historical: Indigenismo; Ethnocacerism; Anti-imperialism; Socialism of the 21st century Bolivarianism
- Political position: Centre-left; Historical: Left-wing
- National affiliation: Peru Wins (2010–2012)
- Regional affiliation: São Paulo Forum; COPPPAL

Peruvian Nationalist Party (Spanish: Partido Nacionalista Peruano; PNP) was a centre-left to left-wing political party in Peru.

== History ==
The Nationalist Party had as its antecedent the Peruvian Nationalist Movement. The party was originally conceived to be the main political expression of the ethnocacerist ideology, though the ideology was renounced by party founder Ollanta Humala in 2006.

Ollanta Humala was the Peruvian Nationalist Party's presidential nominee for the 2006 general election, running under a joint ticket with Union for Peru, as the party was not registered on time for the election. Humala lost the runoff against Alan García of the Peruvian Aprista Party. However, the alliance with the Union for Peru would be dissolved, and the members of the Nationalist Party would form the Nationalist bench made up of 25 Congressmen. In 2010, PNP formed the alliance Peru Wins ("Gana Perú") to participate in 2011 general election. In the runoff vote on 5 June 2011, Humala was elected president against Keiko Fujimori of the Force 2011. He served in office on from 28 July 2011 to 28 July 2016.

Initially perceived as a full-fledged socialist government inspired by the Venezuelan Chavismo, Humala's presidency ultimately embraced free-market policies, although not at the same rhythm as previous administrations. Interpreting his sudden change as a betrayal to his voters, the Nationalist congressional caucus was reduced from 47 seats to 26, as most members rejected the government's inaction in fulfilling Humala's campaign initiatives. In addition, First Lady Nadine Heredia sought to be a controversial figure for the administration by indirectly taking a more active role in her husband's work, ultimately being seen as a dual presidency. Pundits agree on qualifying Humala's Nationalist presidency as mediocre, as no substantial changes were made in both economic and social aspects of Peru. Humala was also considered to have shifted towards neoliberalism and the political centre during his presidency.

The party opted to not take part in the 2016 general elections, in order to preserve its status as an official party; in Peru, a party that fails to obtain above 5% in a national election is automatically removed from the registry of political parties. With the party's prospective presidential candidate Daniel Urresti polling at around 1% in the run-up to the election, the PNP decided to refrain from electoral politics until local elections in 2018.

=== 2021 general election ===
Following a dry spell by not participating in the 2018 regional and municipal elections and the 2020 snap parliamentary election, the party announced Humala as its presidential nominee for the 2021 general election. On election day, with only 1.6% of the valid votes in the presidential election and 1.51% in the parliamentary election, the party failed to overcome the electoral fence and the party lost its registration as a political party.

== Guidelines ==
The PNP is a party strictly centralized in the figure of Ollanta Humala, but it had a strong ideological influence from the thought of José Carlos Mariátegui, Víctor Haya de la Torre and even Juan Velasco Alvarado. The political vision that characterizes the party is to seek a transformation of the country through the construction of a social and political majority; It also seeks the mobilization of the country's human and "moral" resources to contribute to the construction of the State.

Some of the main goals set by the party consisted of dignifying politics, promoting justice, economic and social development for the re-founding of democracy; it also promotes equality before the courts for everyone.

== Electoral results ==
=== Presidential elections ===
Year	Candidate	Party / Coalition	Votes	Percentage	Outcome
2006	Ollanta Humala	Union for Peru; UPP-PNP	1st Round: 3,758,258	1st Round: 30.62	1st Round: 1st
2006	Ollanta Humala	Union for Peru; UPP-PNP	2nd Round: 6,270,080	2nd Round: 47.37	2nd Round: 2nd
2011	Ollanta Humala	Peru Wins PNP-PS-PCP-PSR-MPVS	1st Round: 4,643,064	1st Round: 31.70	1st Round: 1st
2011	Ollanta Humala	Peru Wins PNP-PS-PCP-PSR-MPVS	2nd Round: 7,937,704	2nd Round: 51.45	2nd Round: 1st
2016	Daniel Urresti	Peruvian Nationalist Party	Ticket withdrawn	N/A	N/A
2021	Ollanta Humala	Peruvian Nationalist Party	230,831	1.60	13th

=== Elections to the Congress of the Republic ===
Election	Votes	%	Seats	▲/▼	Position
2006	2,274,739 as part of Peruvian Nationalist Party - UPP Electoral Alliance	21.2%	45 / 120	▲33	Minority
2011	3,245,003 as part of Peru Wins	25.3%	47 / 130	▲13	Minority
2016	List withdrawn	N/A	N/A	Steady	N/A
2021	178,685	1.5%	0 / 130	Steady	NA
