= 2022 Peruvian regional and municipal elections =

Local elections in Peru

- October 2, 2022

25 regional governments 196 provincial municipalities 1694 district municipalities
- Registered: 24,760,062
- Turnout: 77.30%

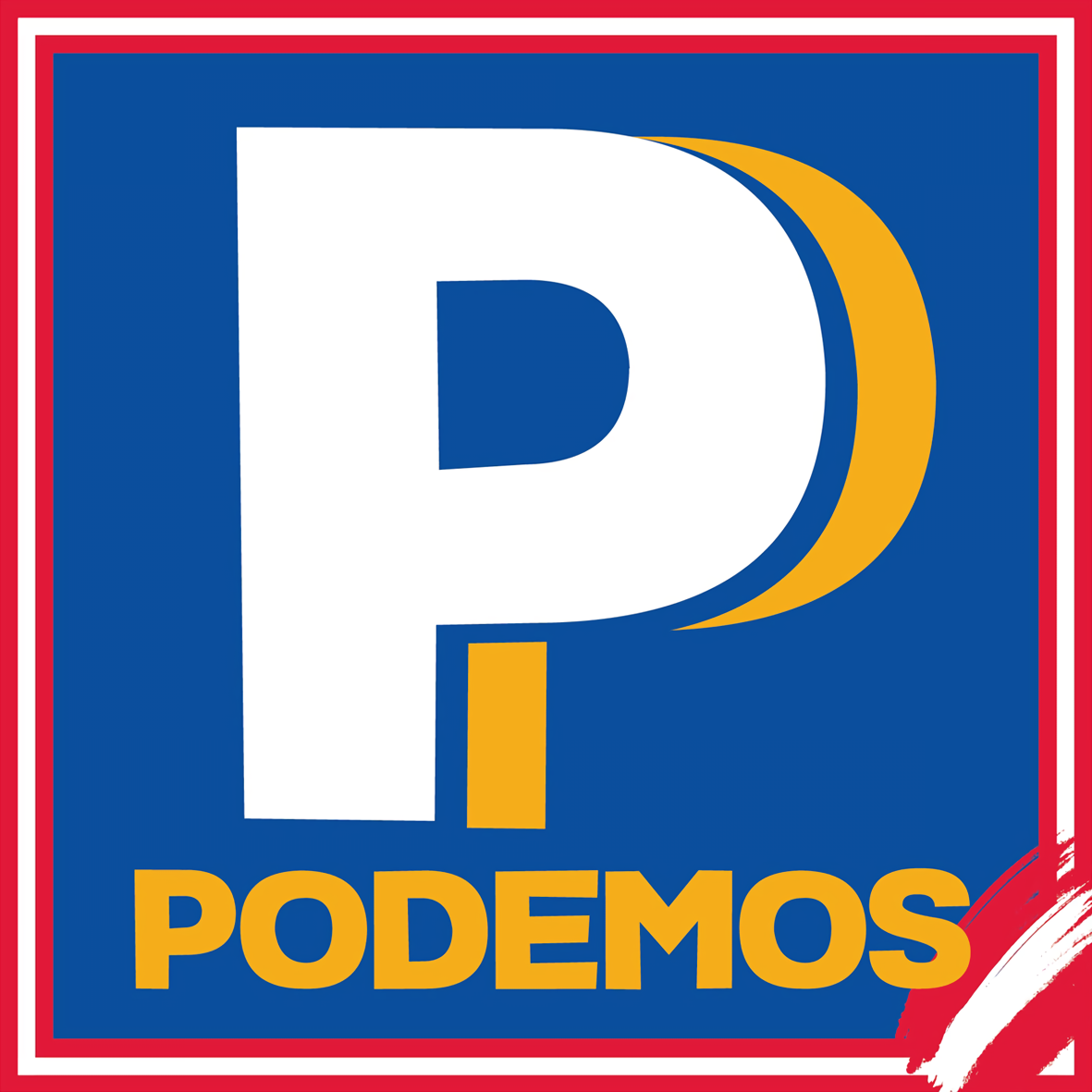

	First party	Second party	Third party
Party	We Are Peru	Popular Renewal	Podemos Perú
Last election	9 prov., 4.77%	0 prov., 1.31%	1 prov., 8.54%
Popular vote	2,263,635	1,664,005	1,600,688
Percentage	13.76%	10.11%	9.73%
Swing	▲8.99%	▲8.80%	▲1.19%
Gov.	7	0	0
Gov. +/–	▲6	0	▼1
Prov.	28	2	3
Prov. +/–	▲19	▲2	▲2
Dist.	171	36	42
Dist. +/–	▲82	▲28	▲20
	Fourth party	Fifth party	Sixth party
Party	Alliance for Progress	Front of Hope 2021	Go on Country
Last election	26 prov., 9.61%	New	4 prov., 1.57%
Popular vote	1,557,758	950,011	711,857
Percentage	9.47%	5.77%	4.33%
Swing	▼0.14%	New	▲2.76%
Gov.	2	1	1
Gov. +/–	▼2	New	▲1
Prov.	17	4	10
Prov. +/–	▼9	New	▲6
Dist.	167	35	74
Dist. +/–	▼66	New	▲56
	Seventh party	Eighth party	Ninth party
Party	Together for Peru	Free Peru	Independents
Last election	0 prov., 1.04%	New	112 prov., 31.02%
Popular vote	670,930	412,066	6,064,140
Percentage	4.08%	2.50%	36.86%
Swing	▲3.04%	New	▲5.84%
Gov.	0	0	14
Gov. +/–	0	New	▼1
Prov.	4	3	122
Prov. +/–	▲4	New	▲10
Dist.	38	73	982
Dist. +/–	▲28	New	▲97

Municipal and regional elections in Peru were held on Sunday, 2 October 2022, electing authorities for the period 2023–2026. Since 2018, municipal and regional officials cannot serve consecutive terms.

== Electoral system ==
=== Regional ===
Regional governments are constituted as the administrative and governing body of the departments of Peru. They are composed of the regional governor, the regional lieutenant governor and the Regional Council.

Voting is based on universal suffrage, which includes all national citizens over the age of eighteen, registered and resident in each department and in full enjoyment of their political rights, as well as non-national citizens residing and registered in the department.

The governor and regional lieutenant governor are elected by direct suffrage. For a candidate to be proclaimed the winner, they must obtain no less than 30% of valid votes. In case no candidate achieves that percentage in the first round of elections, the two most voted candidates participate in a second round or ballot. There is no immediate reelection of regional governors.

=== Municipal ===
Provincial and district municipalities constitute the administrative and governing body of the provinces and districts of Peru. They are composed of the mayor and the municipal council (provincial and district).

Voting is based on universal suffrage, which includes all national citizens over the age of eighteen, registered and resident in the province or district and in full enjoyment of their political rights, as well as non-national citizens residing and registered in the province or district. There is no immediate reelection of mayors.

The municipal councils are composed of between 5 and 15 councilors (except that of the province of Lima, composed of 39 councilors) elected by direct suffrage for a period of four (4) years, in conjunction with the election of the mayor (who presides over the council). Voting is by closed and blocked list. The winning list is assigned the seats according to the d'Hondt method or half plus one, whichever favors it the most.

== Campaigning ==
For the mayoral elections in Lima, Rafael López Aliaga of Popular Renewal, Luis Molina of Go on Country – Social Integration Party and Álvaro Paz de la Barra of Faith in Peru announced their campaigns in early 2022. López Aliaga said that if elected, he would resign from office to run in the 2026 presidential elections, choosing Renzo Reggiardo as a successor to his potential mayoral term.

== Regional elections ==
Department	Governor	Political party	Governor-elect	Political party
Amazonas	Oscar Altamirano Quispe	Fuerza Amazonense		
Áncash	Henry Borja Cruzado	We Are Peru		
Apurímac	Baltazar Lantarón Núñez	Llankasun Kuska		
Arequipa	Kimmerlee Gutiérrez Canahuire	Arequipa - Unidos por el Gran Cambio		
Ayacucho	Carlos Rua Carbajal	Musuq Ñan		
Cajamarca	Mesías Guevara Amasifuén	Popular Action		
Callao	Dante Mandriotti Castro	Por Ti Callao		
Cusco	Jean Paul Benavente	Popular Action		
Huancavelica	Maciste Díaz Abad	Trabajando para Todos		
Huánuco	Juan Alvarado Cornelio	Popular Action		
Ica	Javier Gallegos Barrientos	Obras por la Modernidad		
Junín	Fernando Orihuela Rojas	Free Peru		
La Libertad	Manuel Llempén Coronel	Alliance for Progress		
Lambayeque	Anselmo Lozano Centurión	Podemos Perú		
Lima	Ricardo Chavarría Oría	Fuerza Regional		
Loreto	Elisbán Ochoa Sosa	National Restoration		
Madre de Dios	Luis Hidalgo Okimura	Alliance for Progress		
Moquegua	Zenón Cuevas Pare	Moquegua Emprendedora		
Pasco	Pedro Ubaldo Polinar	Alliance for Progress		
Piura	Servando García Correa	Fuerza Regional		
Puno	Germán Alejo Apaza	Integración por el Desarrollo Regional		
San Martín	Pedro Bogarín Vargas	Acción Regional		
Tacna	Juan Tonconi Quispe	Acción por la Unidad		
Tumbes	Dante Ramírez Zárate	Faena		
Ucayali	Ángel Gutiérrez Rodríguez	Alliance for Progress		

== Municipal elections ==
=== Provinces ===
Province	Population	Mayor	Political party	Mayor-elect	Political party
Lima	9,674,755	Jorge Muñoz Wells	Popular Action		
Arequipa	1,175,765	Omar Candia Aguilar	Arequipa Renace		
Callao	1,129,854	Pedro López Barrios	Por Ti Callao		
Trujillo	1,118,724	José Ruíz Vega	Alliance for Progress		
Piura	894,847	Juan Díaz Dios	Región para Todos		
Chiclayo	862,709	Marcos Gasco Arrobas	Podemos Perú		
Huancayo	595,183	Juan Quispe Ledesma	Free Peru		
Maynas	550,551	Francisco Sanjurjo Dávila	Esperanza Región Amazónica		
Cusco	511,019	Víctor Boluarte Medina	Tawantinsuyo		
Santa	474,053	Roberto Briceño Franco	Áncash a la Obra		
Coronel Portillo	447,733	Segundo Pérez Collazos	Alliance for Progress		
Ica	445,752	Emma Mejía Venegas	Obras por la Modernidad		
Cajamarca	388,170	Víctor Villar Narro	Frente Regional de Cajamarca		
Tacna	346,192	Julio Medina Castro	Frente Unitario Popular		
San Román	344,030	Martín Ticona Maquera	Integración por el Desarrollo Regional		
Sullana	341,490	Edwar Saldaña Sánchez	Seguridad y Prosperidad		
Lambayeque	340,835	Alexander Rodríguez Alvarado	Alliance for Progress		
Huamanga	317,801	Yuri Gutiérrez Gutiérrez	Musuq Ñan		
Huánuco	315,799	José Villavicencio Guardia	Popular Action		
Chincha	262,110	Armando Huamán Tasayco	Unidos por la Región		
Cañete	250,420	Segundo Díaz de la Cruz	Alliance for Progress		
Huaura	240,717	Marcial Echegaray Virú	Concertación para el Desarrollo		
Satipo	239,105	Iván Olivera Meza	Caminemos Juntos por Junín		
Puno	230,219	Martín Ticona Maquera	Integración por el Desarrollo Regional		
San Martín	218,074	Tedy del Águila Gronerth	Popular Action		
Jaén	203,724	Víctor Villar Narro	Frente Regional de Cajamarca		
Huaral	194,375	Jaime Cirilo Uribe Ochoa	Fuerza Regional		
Huaraz	185,276	Eliseo Mautino Ángeles	Acción Nacionalista Peruano		
Tumbes	171,356	Carlos Silva Mena	Renovación Tumbesina		
Tambopata	140,214	Francisco Rengifo Khan	Fuerza por Madre de Dios		
Moyobamba	133,631	Gástelo Huamán Chinchay	Acción Regional		
Pasco	125,164	Marco de la Cruz Bustillos	Pasco Dignidad		
Huancavelica	121,265	Rómulo Cayllahua Paytan	Trabajando para Todos		
Abancay	120,116	Guido Chahuaylla Maldonado	Llankasun Kuska		
Mariscal Nieto	95,551	Abraham Cárdenas Romero	Unión for Peru		
Chachapoyas	63,188	Víctor Culqui Puerta	Sentimiento Amazonense Regional		

=== Districts ===
District	Population	Mayor	Political party	Mayor-elect	Political party
San Juan de Lurigancho	1,177,629	Álex Gonzáles Castillo	Podemos Perú		
San Martín de Porres	744,050	Julio Chávez Chiong	Popular Action		
Ate	670,818	Edde Cuéllar Alegría	Popular Action		
Comas	573,884	Raúl Díaz Pérez	Unión for Peru		
Villa María del Triunfo	437,992	Eloy Chávez Hernández	Peru Secure Homeland		
Villa El Salvador	423,887	Clodoaldo Ýñigo Peralta	Peru Secure Homeland		
San Juan de Miraflores	412,865	Daniel Castro Segura	Popular Action		
Santiago de Surco	408,086	Jean Combe Portocarrero	We Are Peru		
Carabayllo	400,414	Marcos Espinoza Ortiz	Alliance for Progress		
Puente Piedra	395,819	Rennán Espinoza Venegas	We Are Peru		
Ventanilla	369,618	Pedro Spadaro Philipps	Fuerza Chalaca		
Chorrillos	355,978	Augusto Miyashiro Ushikubo	National Solidarity		
Los Olivos	351,983	Felipe Castillo Alfaro	Siempre Unidos		
Lurigancho-Chosica	283,231	Víctor Castillo Sánchez	Alliance for Progress		
Cerro Colorado	229,142	Benigno Cornejo Valencia	Arequipa Avancemos		
El Porvenir	229,115	Segundo Rebaza Benites	Alliance for Progress		
La Esperanza	224,427	Herguein Namay Valderrama	Alliance for Progress		
Independencia	222,850	José Pando Fernández	Siempre Unidos		
El Agustino	221,974	Víctor Salcedo Ríos	Alliance for Progress		
Santa Anita	221,776	José Luis Nole	Christian People's Party		
La Victoria	188,619	Luis Gutiérrez Salvatierra	We Are Peru		
Veintiséis de Octubre	187,787	Darwin García Marchena	Región para Todos		
Castilla	183,759	José Aguilar Silva	Región para Todos		
Rímac	180,260	Pedro Rosario Tueros	Popular Action		
Nuevo Chimbote	180,252	Caldas Crecencio Domingo	Áncash a la Obra		
El Tambo	175,725	Carlo Curisinche Eusebio	Free Peru		
San Miguel	173,309	Juan Guevara Bonilla	San Miguel Me Gusta		
José Leonardo Ortiz	165,355	Wilder Guevara Díaz	Podemos Perú		
La Molina	160,244	Álvaro Paz de la Barra	Popular Action		
San Juan Bautista	152,555	José Arévalo Pinedo	National Restoration		
Pachacámac	142,133	Guillermo Pomez Cano	We Are Peru		
San Sebastián	134,182	Mario Loaiza Moriano	We Are Peru		
Paucarpata	134,099	José Supo Condori	Alliance for Progress		
Coronel Gregorio Albarracín Lanchipa	133,338	Freddy Huashualdo Huanacuni	All for Peru		
San Borja	127,102	Alberto Tejada Noriega	Popular Action		
Tambo Grande	124,028	Alfredo Rengifo Navarrete	National Solidarity		
Yarinacocha	118,666	Bertha Barbarán Bustos	Alliance for Progress		
Lurín	109,506	Francisco Julca Mideyros	We Are Peru		
Miraflores	108,855	Luis Molina Arles	National Solidarity		
Manantay	107,364	Víctor López Ríos	Alliance for Progress		
Santiago	103,817	Fermín García Fuentes	Tawantinsuyo		
Cayma	103,140	Jaime Chávez Flores	Juntos por el Desarrollo de Arequipa		
Surquillo	100,339	Giancarlo Casassa Sánchez	Christian People's Party		
Chilca	100,252	Luis de la Cruz Sullca	Free Peru		
La Victoria	99,183	Raúl Olivera Morales	Podemos Perú		
Pueblo Libre	94,010	Stephen Haas Del Carpio	Popular Action		
Breña	93,111	José Li Bravo	Popular Action		
Punchana	88,908	Jane Donayre Chávez	Esperanza Región Amazónica		
Amarilis	88,635	Antonio Pulgar Lucas	Unidos por Huánuco		
Alto Selva Alegre	88,537	Samuel Tarqui Mamani	Arequipa Avancemos		
Huanchaco	87,192	Estay García Castillo	Popular Force		
Independencia	87,112	Fidencio Sánchez Caururo	Siempre Unidos		
Ancón	82,677	Pedro Barrera Bernui	We Are Peru		
José Luis Bustamante y Rivero	82,642	Paul Rondón Andrade	Arequipa Renace		
Jesús María	81,743	Jorge Quintana García	Popular Action		
Catacaos	80,950	José Muñoz Vera	Región para Todos		
Bellavista	80,704	Daniel Malpartida Filio	Por Ti Callao		
Víctor Larco Herrera	78,304	César Juárez Castillo	Alliance for Progress		
Pueblo Nuevo	73,510	Bertha Peña Ormeño	Go on Country – Social Integration Party		
Majes	70,780	Renee Cáceres Falla	Arequipa - Unidos por el Gran Cambio		
San Jerónimo	70,453	Albert Arenas Yábar	Fuerza Inka Amazónica		
San Isidro	67,703	Augusto Cáceres Viñas	Popular Action		
Pangoa	65,356	Celso León Llallico	Caminemos Juntos por Junín		
Magdalena del Mar	65,139	Carlomagno Chacón Gómez	Popular Action		
La Perla	64,454	Aníbal Jara Aguirre	Por Ti Callao		
Mariano Melgar	64,442	Percy Cornejo Barragán	Arequipa Avancemos		
Miraflores	63,632	Luis Aguirre Chávez	Peruvian Aprista Party		
Wanchaq	61,364	William Peña Farfán	Tawantinsuyo		
Chancay	60,774	Domitila Dulanto de Balta	Concertación para el Desarrollo		
Perené	60,225	Hermenegildo Navarro Castro	Sierra y Selva Contigo Junín		
Parcona	60,173	José Choque Gutiérrez	Go on Country – Social Integration Party		
Lince	59,578	Vicente Amable Escalante	Popular Action		
Mórrope	56,131	Nery Castillo Santamaría	Peruvian Aprista Party		
San Luis	55,793	David Rojas Maza	Popular Action		
Olmos	55,691	Adrián Arroyo Soplopuco	Podemos Perú		
San Juan Bautista	53,934	María Palomino Prado	Musuq Ñan		
Los Baños del Inca	53,298	Edilberto Aguilar Flores	We Are Peru		
Pimentel	52,505	José Palacios Pinglo	Podemos Perú		
Mi Perú	52,384	Elisa Vega Vega	Por Ti Callao		
Jacobo Hunter	51,848	Walter Aguilar Vidal	Alliance for Progress		
Pillco Marca	51,354	Lidgardo Vara Estrada	Alliance for Progress		
La Banda de Shilcayo	49,359	José del Águila García	Popular Action		
Nueva Cajamarca	46,862	Segundo Vásquez Tan	Nueva Amazonía		
Carmen de La Legua-Reynoso	46,409	Carlos Cox Palomino	Por Ti Callao		
La Tinguiña	46,164	Juan Roque Hernández	Obras por la Modernidad		
