= Reggiardo =

Reggiardo is a Spanish surname. Notable people with the surname include:

- Andrés Reggiardo (1941–2025), Peruvian politician
- Mauricio Reggiardo (born 1970), Argentine rugby union footballer
- Renzo Reggiardo (born 1972), Peruvian politician and businessman, son of Andrés
