= 1972 in Peru =

- Decades: 1950s; 1960s; 1970s; 1980s; 1990s
- See also: Other events of 1972; Timeline of Peruvian history

This article lists events from the year 1972 in Peru.

== Incumbents ==
- President: Fernando Belaúnde Terry
- Vice President of Peru: Luis Edgardo Mercado Jarrín
- Prime Minister: Ernesto Montagne Sánchez

== Events ==
- 12 April – Carmen Amelia Ampuero is selected as Miss Peru Universe 1972.
- At the 1972 Summer Olympics in Munich, West Germany, Peru is represented in seven sports, by 20 competitors, 17 men and 3 women.

== Cinema ==
- Cholo, starring football player Hugo Sotil

== Sport ==
- 1972 Copa Perú

== Births ==
- 18 March – Mario Rodríguez, footballer
- 6 December – Mónica Santa María, model and TV hostess (died 1994)

== Deaths ==
- 12 March – César Atahualpa Rodríguez, poet (born 1889)
