= Augusto Miyashiro Ushikubo =

Peruvian engineer and politician

Augusto Sergio Miyashiro Ushikubo (Japan, January 26, 1981) is a Peruvian engineer and politician of Japanese origin. He was mayor of the district of Chorrillos from January 1, 2019, to December 31, 2022.

== Political career ==
He was a member of the National Solidarity party and started in politics as a candidate for councilor of the Municipality of Lima on the list led by Luis Castañeda Lossio for the 2014 municipal elections. Miyashiro was elected as councilor for the 2015-2018 municipal period.

In the 2018 municipal elections, Miyashiro ran for mayor of the district of Chorrillos after his father was barred from re-election. Culminating the processes, Miyashiro was elected as the new mayor of Chorrillos for the 2019–2022 term.

As part of his administration, he acquired pickup trucks and motorcycles for security forces to combat crime.

With Miyashiro Ushikubo, the Miyashiro dynasty in the district of Chorrillos came to an end because, in the municipal elections of 2022, his father Augusto Miyashiro of Podemos Perú lost the election after being defeated by Fernando Velasco of Alianza para el Progreso.
