= Fernando Velasco Huamán =

Peruvian politician (born 1976)

Fernando Emilio Velasco Huamán (Jesús María, July 19, 1976) is a Peruvian politician. He is the current mayor of the district of Chorrillos since January 1, 2023.

== Political career ==
He began his political career as a member of the fujimorista party Fuerza Popular and ran for mayor of the District of Chorrillos in the 2014 municipal elections, however, he was not elected.

Mayor of Chorrillos

Velasco joined César Acuña's Alianza para el Progreso party and ran for mayor of Chorrillos for a second time in 2018 without success. He was finally elected as mayor of the district of Chorrillos in the 2022 municipal elections, defeating Augusto Miyashiro who had remained in office since 1996. Velasco was sworn in for the 2023–2026 term.

== Controversies ==
Fernando Velasco came under scrutiny after being accused of demanding bribes in order to be included on the Alianza para el Progreso candidate list. These allegations were supported by audio recordings released by the Sunday newspaper Cuarto Poder in June 2023.

He also faced criticism for purchasing patrol vans worth S/3 million (three million Peruvian soles) that were not properly equipped. Additionally, his decision to hire a friend at the Municipality for a salary of S/38,000 was also questioned.
