= Andrés Reggiardo =

Peruvian politician (1941–2025)

Oscar Andrés Reggiardo Sayán

Member of the Congress
- In office 26 July 1995 – 26 July 2001
- Constituency: National

Member of the Democratic Constituent Congress
- In office 26 November 1992 – 26 July 1995
- Constituency: National

President of the Peru Secure Homeland
- In office 26 September 2013 – 7 September 2021

Personal details
- Born: Óscar Andrés Reggiardo Sayán; 11 May 1941 Lima, Peru
- Died: 5 February 2025 (aged 83)
- Party: Peru Secure Homeland (2013–2021); Cambio 90 (until 2013)
- Spouse: Eugenia Cecilia Barreto Salazar
- Children: Carla Reggiardo Sandra Reggiardo Renzo Reggiardo
- Education: National Agrarian University - La Molina; Colegio San Agustín
- Profession: Politician

Óscar Andrés Reggiardo Sayán (11 May 1941 – 5 February 2025) was a Peruvian Fujimorist politician who served as a congressman. His son Renzo Reggiardo also served as a Congressman for Lima for two terms between 2006 and 2016.

== Background ==
Reggiardo was born in Lima on 11 May 1941, the son of Andres Reggiardo Rossi and Emilia Sayán. He completed his school studies at the Colegio San Agustín in the city of Lima.

He entered the La Molina National Agrarian University where he studied Zootechnical Engineering. He completed a master's degree in food technology at the State University of Campinas in São Paulo.

From 1991 to 1992 he was Head of the National Planning Institute, during the government of Alberto Fujimori.

Reggiardo worked for the project of the Quinoa Experimental Center of the Food and Agriculture Organization of the United Nations (FAO) in Bolivia.

He was a researcher for the OAS multinational Food Technology project, as well as a General Manager of the R-3-H mills.

In the academic field, he taught at the Pontificia Universidad Católica del Perú, the Universidad del Altiplano and the Universidad Nacional Agraria La Molina.

Reggiardo died on 5 February 2025, at the age of 83.

== Political career ==
=== Early political career ===
In the 1990 elections, Reggiardo ran for deputy for Lima under the Cambio 90 party, but he was not elected as the party only attained 32 seats in the Chamber of Deputies.

=== Constituent congressman ===
In the 1992 Democratic Constituent Congress election, Reggiardo ran for a seat in the Democratic Constituent Congress, and was elected. He served as a Constituent Congressman between 1992 and 1995 in which he was elected under the Cambio 90-New Majority alliance of then-President Alberto Fujimori. During his term in the Democratic Constituent Congress, he served as the Third Vice President of the Constituent Congress from 1994 to 1995.

=== Congressional career ===
In the 1995 elections, he was elected as a member of the newly unicameral Congress under the Cambio 90-New Majority alliance and was re-elected in the 2000 elections under the Fujimorist Peru 2000 coalition and served until 2001 due to President Alberto Fujimori's resignation and in the 2001 elections, he lost his seat when he attempted to retain his seat by running in the constituency of Lima, but was not elected as he attained a low number of votes.

=== Post-congressional career ===
In 2013, he and his son Renzo founded the Peru Secure Homeland, the successor of Cambio 90. In 2020, he was part of the presidential ticket of Rafael Santos for the 2021 general elections under the Peru Secure Homeland in which, he founded and was running for Second Vice President.
