= Denise Main =

Denise Maillet Main (born 1950) is an American physician and leading AIDS activist in the San Francisco Bay area. Main is the President of Siempre Unidos California, and is Director of the Prenatal Diagnosis Center at California Pacific Medical Center.

== Biography ==
Born on February 8, 1950, to Andre and Vera Maillet in New York City, Main grew up in Venezuela and Puerto Rico, returning to the United States only for college.

Main received her B.A. degree from Yale College in 1972. She then graduated from Medical School at the University of Vermont College of Medicine in 1977. She did her internship at St. Louis Children's Hospital in 1978 and had residencies there and Barnes-Jewish Hospital from 1979 through 1982. Main received a fellowship from the University of Pennsylvania in 1984.

Main is board certified in Obstetrics and gynaecology, maternal fetal medicine, medical genetics, and pediatrics. She has published over 30 peer-reviewed articles and has been cited in.

== Career ==
=== AIDS work ===
Starting with a trip to Honduras in 1995 as with St. Stephen's Episcopal Church, Belvedere, CA, Main saw the urgent need for anti-retroviral medication. Main is the president of Siempre Unidos California.

In 2007, the Yale College of Divinity recognized her important work with an honorary doctor of humane letters.

=== Maternal fetal medicine ===
Main has served on the board of the Society of Maternal Fetal Medicine and was a founding fellow of the American College of Medical Genetics. In 1990, she established California Pacific's Prenatal Diagnosis Center, which has grown into one of the most respected Prenatal Diagnosis centers in the United States. Main regularly appears on lists of the best doctors in maternal-fetal medicine.
