= Timeline of Lima =

History of Lima

Coordinates: 12.043333°S 77.028333°W

The following is a timeline of the history of the city of Lima, Peru.

== Prior to 19th century ==
- 1535
  - Ciudad de los Reyes founded by Francisco Pizarro.
  - Cathedral of Lima construction begins.
  - Plaza Mayor location designated.
- 1541
  - 26 June: Francisco Pizarro assassinated.
  - Catholic Diocese of Lima established.
- 1542 – Spanish Real Audiencia established.
- 1548 – Jerónimo de Loayza becomes Catholic Archbishop of Lima.
- 1549 – Municipal Palace of Lima built.
- 1551 – University of San Marcos founded.
- 1555 - Artisan guilds established (approximate date).
- 1565 – Casa de Moneda de Lima (mint) established.
- 1581 – Antonio Ricardo sets up printing press.
- 1586 – 1586 Lima–Callao earthquake.
- 1613 - Consulado (merchant guild) begins operating.
- 1625 – Cathedral Basilica of Lima consecrated.
- 1655 - 13 November: 1655 Peru earthquake.
- 1671
  - Iglesia de Nuestra Señora de los Desamparados (Lima) (church) built.
  - Rose of Lima canonized as a religious saint.
- 1674 - Basilica and Convent of San Francisco completed.
- 1687
  - 1687 Peru earthquake.
  - Lima City Walls built.
- 1700 – Population: 37,234.
- 1746 – 1746 Lima–Callao earthquake.
- 1768 – Plaza de toros de Acho (bullring) constructed.
- 1791 – Population: 52,627.
- 1799 – Callao-Lima highway constructed.

== 19th century ==
- 1808 – Public cemetery established.
- 1812 – Population: 63,900.
- 1820 – Treasure of Lima reputedly removed from city.
- 1821 - Lima taken by forces of José de San Martín; Peruvian independence from Spanish Empire declared.
- 1822 - National Library of Peru founded.
- 1828 – Earthquake.
- 1838 – July: Political unrest.
- 1839 – El Comercio newspaper begins publication.
- 1854
  - Medical Society founded.
  - Yellow fever epidemic.
- 1856 – Saint Cecilia Philharmonic Society formed.
- 1860
  - April: Earthquake.
  - Lima Stock Exchange and Artisan Mutual Aid Society founded.
- 1861 – Peru National Archive established.
- 1865 - November: City taken by anti-Spanish forces during the Chincha Islands War.
- 1867 - Fabrica de Chocolate Cavenago y Cortazar established.
- 1868 – Club de la Union founded.
- 1870 – Lima City Walls dismantled.
- 1872 – Palacio de la Exposición built; Lima International Exhibition held.
- 1876
  - Escuela Especial de Construcciones Civiles y Minas established.
  - Population: 101,488.
- 1881 – Occupation of Lima by Chilean forces begins.
- 1883 – Occupation of Lima by Chilean forces ends.
- 1886
  - Ateneo de Lima established.
  - Teatro Olimpo (theatre) inaugurated.
- 1888 – Sociedad Geográfica de Lima founded.
- 1897 – Estadio Guadalupe opens.
- 1898 – Instituto Tecnico e Industrial del Peru inaugurated.

== 20th century ==
=== 1900s-1940s ===
- 1903 – Sociedad Empleados de Comercio organized.
- 1906
  - Museo de Historia Nacional opens.
  - Lima Cricket and Football Club active.
- 1907 – Lima Philharmonic Society founded.
- 1908 - Population: 140,884.
- 1914 – Teatro Colón (theatre) inaugurated.
- 1918 - Museum of Natural History, Lima established.
- 1923 – Museum of Italian Art inaugurated.
- 1924 – Archbishop's Palace of Lima built.
- 1928 - 21 July: Asociación Nacional de Periodistas del Perú founded in Lima.
- 1929 – Teatro Municipal established.
- 1933 - Jardín botánico Octavio Velarde Núñez (garden) established.
- 1935 – Lima Municipal Library established.
- 1936 – Cine Metro (cinema) opens.
- 1938
  - Government Palace built.
  - National Symphony Orchestra founded.
- 1939 – Legislative Palace built on Paseo Colón.
- 1940 – Avenida Abancay constructed.
- 1944 – Municipal Palace of Lima rebuilt.

=== 1950s-1990s ===
- 1958 – Cine El Pacifico (cinema) in Miraflores built.
- 1959
  - El Ángel Cemetery (cemetery) established.
  - Pastelería San Antonio in business.
- 1961 - Population: 1,436,231 urban agglomeration.
- 1962 – University of Lima founded.
- 1964 - 24 May: Estadio Nacional disaster.
- 1966 – 17 October: 1966 Peru earthquake.
- 1969 - Perú Negro (musical group) formed.
- 1972 - Population: 2,833,609 city; 3,302,523 urban agglomeration.
- 1980 - Colegio de Periodistas del Perú founded.
- 1981 - City partnered with Austin, Texas, USA.
- 1984 - Túpac Amaru Revolutionary Movement active.
- 1988 – Historic Centre of Lima designated an UNESCO World Heritage Site.
- 1990
  - Lima Metro opens.
  - Population: 6,414,500 (estimate).
- 1991 – 3 November: Barrios Altos massacre.
- 1992
  - 16 July: Tarata bombing.
  - La Cantuta massacre.
- 1996
  - 17 December: Japanese embassy hostage crisis begins.
  - Alberto Andrade Carmona becomes mayor.
- 1997 – Jockey Plaza shopping centre in Surco in business.
- 1998 - Orchestra of the University of Lima founded.
- 1999 – Juan Luis Cipriani Thorne becomes Catholic Archbishop of Lima.

== 21st century ==
- 2001 – Chocavento Tower built.
- 2002 – 21 March: Bombing near U.S. embassy.
- 2003 – Luis Castañeda Lossio becomes mayor.
- 2004
  - 25 July: 2004 Copa América final football tournament held.
  - Camisea Gas Project begins operating.
- 2005 - Consejo Consultivo de Radio y Televisión headquartered in Lima.
- 2007 – Population: 7,605,742; metro 8,472,935.
- 2010 – El Metropolitano bus transit system begins operating.
- 2011
  - Lima Metro begins operating.
  - Universidad de Ingeniería y Tecnología is founded.
  - Susana Villarán becomes mayor.
- 2013 - Air pollution in Lima reaches annual mean of 48 PM2.5 and 88 PM10, more than recommended.
- 2015 - Luis Castañeda Lossio becomes mayor again.
- 2016 - Population: 10,039,455.
- 2019
  - Jorge Muñoz Wells becomes mayor.
  - 2019 Pan American Games are held.
- 2020 - COVID-19 pandemic.
- 2022 - Miguel Romero Sotelo becomes mayor.
- 2023 - Rafael López Aliaga becomes mayor.
- 2025 - Renzo Reggiardo becomes mayor.
- 2027 - 2027 Pan American Games are held.

== See also ==
- History of Lima
- List of mayors of Lima
- Years in Peru

== Bibliography ==
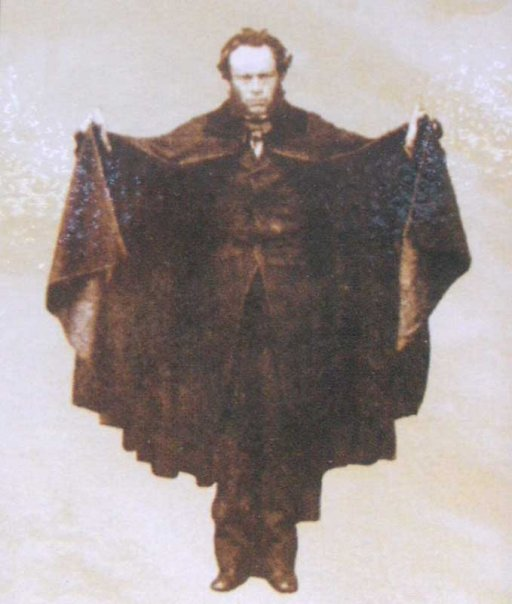
Portrait of Manuel Atanasio Fuentes, Lima historian, 19th century

=== in English ===
Published in the 18th-19th century

- Amédée-François Frézier (1735), "Description of the City of Lima", A Voyage to the South-Sea, and Along the Coasts of Chili and Peru, in the Years 1712, 1713, and 1714, London: Christian Bowyer
- Abraham Rees (1819), "Lima", The Cyclopaedia, London: Longman, Hurst, Rees, Orme & Brown
- Richard Brookes (1820), "Lima", General Gazetteer (17th ed.), London: F.C. and J. Rivington
- David Brewster, ed. (1830). "Lima". Edinburgh Encyclopaedia. Edinburgh: William Blackwood.
- Josiah Conder (1830), "Lima", Peru and Chile, The Modern Traveller, vol. 28, London: J.Duncan
- Clements R. Markham (1856), Cuzco ... and Lima, London: Chapman and Hall, OCLC 5299560, OL 6923534M
- Manuel Atanasio Fuentes [in Spanish] (1866), Lima, London: Trübner & Co., OCLC 3435633
- Charles Knight, ed. (1866). "Lima". Geography. English Cyclopaedia. Vol. 3. London: Bradbury, Evans, & Co. hdl:2027/nyp.33433000064802.
- George Henry Townsend (1867), "Lima", A Manual of Dates (2nd ed.), London: Frederick Warne & Co.
- William Eleroy Curtis (1888), "Lima", The Capitals of Spanish America, New York: Harper & Bros.

Published in the 20th century

- "Lima". Chambers's Encyclopaedia. London. 1901.
- "Peru: Lima". Handbook of Learned Societies and Institutions: America. USA: Carnegie Institution of Washington. 1908. hdl:2027/uc2.ark:/13960/t5t72q98c.
- C. Reginald Enock (1908), "(City of Lima)", Peru, London: Unwin
- Alexander Garland (1908), "Lima and its Environs", Peru in 1906 and after (2nd ed.), Lima: "La Industria" Printing Office, OCLC 1353043
- "Municipal Organization in the Latin-American Capitals: Lima". Bulletin of the International Bureau of the American Republics. 28. Washington, D.C.: International Union of American Republics. May 1909. hdl:2027/uc1.31175033411615.
- Lamoureux, Andrew Jackson (1910). "Lima (Peru)" . Encyclopædia Britannica. Vol. 16 (11th ed.). pp. 689–690.
- Charles Warren Currier (1911), "(Lima)", Lands of the Southern Cross: a Visit to South America, Washington, D.C.: Spanish-American Publication Society
- J.C. Grey (1913). "Lima". Catholic Encyclopedia. New York.
- United States Bureau of Foreign and Domestic Commerce (1914), "Peru: Lima", Trade Directory of South America for the Promotion of American Export Trade, Washington, D.C.: Government Printing Office, OCLC 5821807
- Annie Smith Peck (1916), "Lima", South American Tour, New York: G.H. Doran, OCLC 4541554
- "Lure of Lima, City of the Kings", National Geographic Magazine, vol. 57, Washington DC, 1930
- Dietz, Henry. Poverty and problem-solving under military rule: the urban poor in Lima, Peru. Austin : University of Texas Press, 1980. ISBN 0-292-76460-X
- David S. Parker (1992). "White-Collar Lima, 1910-1929: Commercial Employees and the Rise of the Peruvian Middle Class". Hispanic American Historical Review. 72 (1): 47–72. doi:10.2307/2515947. JSTOR 2515947.

Published in the 21st century

- Ramón, Gabriel. "The script of urban surgery: Lima, 1850–1940". In Arturo Almandoz (ed.), Planning Latin America's capital cities, 1850–1950. New York: Routledge, 2002, pp. 170–192. ISBN 0-415-27265-3
- Steve J. Stein (2002). "The Case of Soccer in Early Twentieth-Century Lima". In Joseph L. Arbena; David G. LaFrance (eds.). Sport in Latin America and the Caribbean. Rowman & Littlefield. ISBN 978-0-8420-2821-9.
- Iñigo García-Bryce (2003). "Politics by Peaceful Means: Artisan Mutual Aid Societies in Mid-Nineteenth-Century Lima, 1860-1879". The Americas. 59 (3): 325–345. doi:10.1353/tam.2003.0010. JSTOR 1008501. S2CID 144195661.
- "Lima". Understanding Slums: Case Studies for the Global Report 2003. United Nations Human Settlements Programme and University College London. 2003.
- Walker, Charles. "The upper classes and their upper stories: architecture and the aftermath of the Lima earthquake of 1746". Hispanic American Historical Review 83 (1): 53–82 (February 2003).
- Patricia H. Marks (2004). "Confronting a Mercantile Elite: Bourbon Reformers and the Merchants of Lima, 1765-1796". The Americas. 60 (4): 519–558. doi:10.1353/tam.2004.0061. JSTOR 4144490. S2CID 144468597.
- Higgins, James. Lima: a Cultural History. Oxford University Press, 2005. ISBN 0-19-517891-2
- David Marley (2005), "Lima", Historic Cities of the Americas, vol. 1, Santa Barbara, California: ABC-CLIO, pp. 796+, ISBN 1576070271
- Alejandra B. Osorio (2008). Inventing Lima: Baroque modernity in Peru's south sea metropolis. Americas in the Early Modern Atlantic World. Palgrave Macmillan. ISBN 978-0-230-61248-8.

=== in Spanish ===
- Lemale, Carlos (1876). Almanaque del comercio de Lima (in Spanish).
- Mariano Felipe Paz Soldán (1877). "Lima". Diccionario geográfico estadístico del Perú (in Spanish). Imprenta del Estado.
- Guia de domicilio é industrial de Lima [Residential and Business Directory of Lima] (in Spanish). 1887.
- Alcalde, Lima (1890). Memoria de la Administracion Municipal de Lima (in Spanish).
- José Toribio Medina (July 1904). La imprenta en Lima (1584-1824) (in Spanish). Santiago de Chile – via HathiTrust. 1904-1907 (4 volumes of titles published in Lima, arranged chronologically)
- Alejandro Yori (1990), Breve Historia de los Teatros Municipales (in Spanish), Municipalidad de Lima Metropolitana
