= Cambio 90 =

Peruvian right-wing political party

Change 90 Cambio 90
- Abbreviation: C90
- President: Andrés Reggiardo
- Secretary: Renzo Reggiardo
- Founder: Alberto Fujimori; Andrés Reggiardo
- Founded: 5 October 1989
- Dissolved: 26 September 2013
- Succeeded by: Peru Secure Homeland
- Ideology: Fujimorism
- Political position: Right-wing
- National affiliation: Cambio 90 – New Majority (1992–1999, 2001–2005); Peru 2000 (1999–2001); Alliance for the Future (2005–2006); National Solidarity Alliance (2010–2011)

Party flag

Cambio 90 (lit. Change 90, C90) was a Peruvian right-wing political party which entered the political spectrum in early 1990, and throughout the 1990s until late-2000 was the most powerful political party in Peru alongside New Majority, serving more as an instrumental electoral vehicle for Alberto Fujimori.

== History ==
Cambio 90's success hinged largely on the success of its candidate for the presidency, Alberto Fujimori, an agricultural engineer and rector of the Universidad Nacional Agraria (National Agrarian University) in Lima's La Molina District from 1984 to 1989. Fujimori's appeal to a large extent was his standing as a political outsider.

At the same time, Cambio 90's success was also attributed largely to its eclectic political base and its active grassroots campaign. Its two main bases of support were the Asociación Peruana de Empresas Medias y Pequeñas (APEMIPE), an association of SMEs, and the informal sector workers who associated their cause with APEMIPE, and the Evangelical movement. Less than four percent of the Peruvian population was Protestant, but the evangelicals were extremely active at the grassroots level, particularly in areas where traditional parties were weak, such as the urban shantytowns, the pueblos jóvenes, and rural areas in the mountains. Although the party only began activities in January 1990, by the time of the elections it had 200,000 members in its ranks.

However, its success at the polls did not translate into a lasting party machinery. The organization was much more of a front than a political party, and its ability to hold together was called into question within a few weeks after attaining power. Cambio 90's two bases of support had little in common with each other except opposition to Mario Vargas Llosa. Its links to Fujimori were new and were ruptured to a large extent when Fujimori opted for an orthodox economic shock program. Less than six months into his government, Fujimori broke with many of his Cambio 90 supporters, including the second vice president and leader of the evangelical movement, Carlos García y García, and APEMIPE. The latter became disenchanted with Fujimori because small businesses were threatened by the dramatic price rises and opening to foreign competition that the Fujishock program entailed. During Fujimori's first term in office, APRA and Vargas Llosa's party, the FREDEMO, remained in control of both chambers of Congress, the Chamber of Deputies and the Senate, hampering the enactment of economic reform. Fujimori also had difficulty of combatting the Maoist Shining Path (Spanish: Sendero Luminoso) guerrilla organization due largely to what he perceived as intransigence and obstructionism in Congress. By March 1992, the Congress met with the approval of only 17% of the electorate, according to one poll; the president's approval stood at 42%, in the same poll. In the 1995 general elections, Fujimori won re-election for a second term, while the party, along with its partner New Majority won a majority of seats in Congress.

During the 2000 elections, Martha Chávez suggested that Fujimori would dissolve Congress if the party, then known as Peru 2000, did not win a majority of seats. She also said that she could not rule out a fourth election of Fujimori, despite the fact that the Constitution of Peru which was written in part by Chávez herself allows presidents to be elected no more than twice in a row. Indeed, Chávez had earlier promised that Fujimori would not run in the 2000 elections. However, Fujimori ran instead.

In the 9 April 2000 legislative elections, the party was part of the Peru 2000 alliance in which, the alliance won 42.2% of the popular vote and 52 out of 120 seats in the Congress of the Republic.

In the aftermath of Fujimori's downfall in late-2000, the party ran once again, allied with New Majority in the 2001 general election, running for congress, attaining only three out of 120 seats in the Congress. For the 2006 general election, the Alliance for the Future coalition was formed, in which Cambio 90 was part alongside New Majority. With Martha Chávez as their presidential nominee, the coalition placed fourth failing to qualify in the June run-off, while in the congressional election, the list got 13 out of 120 seats and received the most votes in Pasco. After the 2006 elections, all of the 13 representatives elected on the Alliance for the Future lists have formed the Fujimorist Parliamentary Group (Spanish: Grupo Parlamentario Fujimorista) in Congress.

== Last years and dissolution ==
In the 2011 general election, Cambio 90 split from Fujimorism, and participated under the National Solidarity Alliance, with former Lima Mayor Luis Castañeda as their presidential nominee. The alliance placed fifth at both the presidential and congressional race, attaining nine out of 130 seats, with Renzo Reggiardo as the only elected congressman from Cambio 90. However, Reggiardo left the alliance after the elections and instead joined the small APRA-led Parliamentary Coordination bloc. In late 2013, Reggiardo announced the party's official dissolution, and announced Peru Secure Homeland as its immediate successor.

== Electoral history ==
=== Presidential elections ===
Year	Candidate	Party / Coalition	Votes	Percentage	Outcome
1990	Alberto Fujimori	Cambio 90	1st Round: 1 932 208	1st Round: 29.09	1st Round: 2nd
1990	Alberto Fujimori	Cambio 90	2nd Round: 4 189 897	2nd Round: 62.38	2nd Round: 1st
1995	Alberto Fujimori	Cambio 90-New Majority Electoral Alliance	4 645 279	64.42	1st
2000	Alberto Fujimori	Peru 2000 C90-NM-SU-SC	1st Round: 5 528 568	1st Round: 49.87	1st Round: 1st
2000	Alberto Fujimori	Peru 2000 C90-NM-SU-SC	2nd Round: 6 041 685	2nd Round: 74.33	2nd Round: 1st
2006	Martha Chávez	Alliance for the Future C90-NM-SC	912 740	7.43	4th
2011	Luis Castañeda	National Solidarity Alliance SN-C90-TPP-SU-UPP	1 440 143	9.83	5th

=== Elections to the Congress of the Republic ===
Year	Votes	%	Number of seats	▲/▼	Position
1990	819 527	16.5%	32 / 180	▲32	Minority
1995	2 193 724 as part of Cambio 90 – New Majority	51.1%	67 / 120	▲23	Majority
2000	4 189 019 as part of Peru 2000	42.2%	52 / 120	▼15	Minority
2001	452 696 as part of Cambio 90 – New Majority	4.8%	3 / 120	▼49	Minority
2006	1 408 055 as part of Alliance for the Future	13.1%	13 / 120	▲10	Minority
2011	1 311 766 as part of National Solidarity Alliance. Only 1 from Cambio 90.	10.2%	9 / 130	▼12	Minority

=== Elections to the Senate ===
Year	Votes	%	Number of seats	▲/▼	Position
1990	1 240 132	21.7%	14 / 62	▲14	Minority

=== Elections to the Democratic Constituent Congress ===
Year	Votes	%	Number of seats	Position
1992	3 040 552	49.2%	44 / 80	Majority

== See also ==
- New Majority (Peru)
- Sí Cumple
- Peru 2000
- Alliance for the Future (Peru)
- Popular Force
- Cambio 21
