= 1989 in Peru =

- Decades: 1960s; 1970s; 1980s; 1990s; 2000s
- See also: Other events of 1989; Timeline of Peruvian history

This article lists events from the year 1989 in Peru.

== Incumbents ==
- President: Alan García (1985–1990)
- Vice President of Peru: Luis Alberto Sánchez (1985–1990)
- Prime Minister:
  - Armando Villanueva (17 May 1988—15 May 1989}
  - Luis Alberto Sánchez (15 May 1989—30 September 1989)
  - Guillermo Larco Cox (30 September 1989—28 July 1990)

== Events ==
- Agenda Diplomática magazine is first published.
