= Fabiola Morales =

Peruvian politician

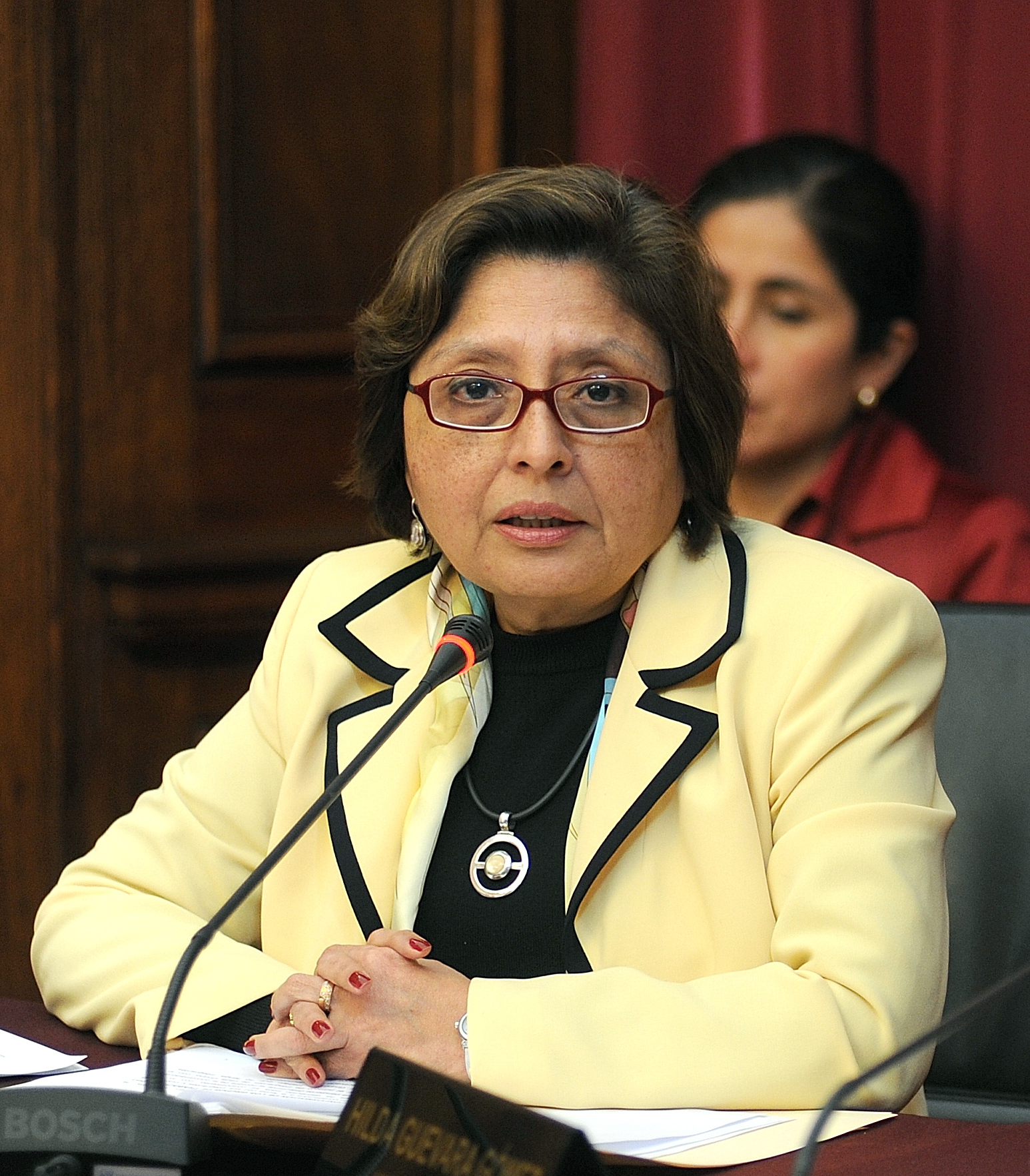

Lieutenant Mayor of Lima
- Incumbent
- Assumed office 13 October 2025
- Mayor: Rafael López Aliaga
- Preceded by: Renzo Reggiardo

Member of Congress
- In office 26 July 2001 – 26 July 2011
- Constituency: Piura

Personal details
- Born: Fabiola María Morales Castillo; 26 September 1955 (age 71) Sullana, Peru
- Party: Popular Renewal (since 2021)
- Other political affiliations: National Solidarity
- Education: University of Piura

Fabiola María Morales Castillo (born 26 September 1955) is a Peruvian politician and a Congresswoman representing Piura for the 2001–2011 term. Morales was elected under the National Unity belongs to the National Solidarity party. She lost her seat in the 2011 elections when she ran for re-election, but she received a minority of votes. Morales is a member of the Madrid Forum, an international alliance of right-wing and far-right individuals.

== Controversies ==
She has been known for her constant activity as a "troll" in order to attack former mayor of Lima, Susana Villaran, from which she has received more criticism than praise. She also gained a negative public image due to major corruption scandals, as well as homophobic comments and discrimination against the handicapped.
