= Timeline of Peruvian history =

This is a timeline of Peruvian history, comprising major legal and territorial changes and political events in Peru and its predecessor states. To read about the background to these events, see History of Peru. See also the list of presidents of Peru.

- Prehispanic or native era (40,000 BC – 1432 AD) This begins with the fourth millennium before Christ (first appearance of humans in Peru) It is the longest era of Peruvian history.
- Inca era (1432–1533) This begins with the emergence of the Inca Empire or Tawantinsuyo by the Inca Pachacuti and ends with the year of 1532 (Battle of Cajamarca).
- Hispanic and viceroyal era (1532–1824) Starting with the year of 1532 (seizure of Atahualpa) and ending with the year of 1824 (Battle of Ayacucho).
- Republican and independent era (1821–pow) Starting with the 28th of July 1821, with the Peruvian War of Independence, until the current day.

== Prehispanic or native Peru (ancient Peru) ==
Year	Date	Event
20.000 - 13.000 BC		The first humans arrive on what is currently Peruvian land. The first settlement in Peru takes place about 20.000 years ago.
13.000 - 7000 BC		Nomadic hunter-gatherer communities were established, including the Paccaicasa, Chivateros, Toquepala, Lauricocha and Paiján.
7000 - 4000 BC		Semi-nomadic horticulturist communities are established, such as the Guitarrero, Pikimachay, Chilca, Telamarchay and Jayhuamachay.
4000 - 2000 BC		Sedentary lifestyles emerged, accompanied by agriculture and livestock farming, with it the people of Tablada de Lurin, Cerro Paloma, Huaca Prieta and Kotosh.
4000 - 2000 BC		First societies develop in the region of Norte Chico; amongst them the Caral, the oldest civilization in the Americas.
2000 BC		Ceramics are found in Peru.
1800 BC		The Caral people disappear, but the Cupisnique culture starts to develop.
1500 BC		Chavin culture emerges in the Andes, and the Pucara people appear in the South.
700 BC		The farming and fishing town of Paracas emerges on the Southern coast.
400 - 200 BC		The cultures of the Salinar, Gallinazo, Cajamarca and Vicus people are founded.
150 BC		The Chavin culture collapsed, parallel to the first emergence of militarized cultures, such as Moche in the North, Nazca in the South and Tihuanaco in the Highlands.
1260		Sinchi Roca was succeeded by his son Lloque Yupanqui.
1290		Lloque Yupanqui was succeeded by his son Mayta Cápac.
1320		Mayta Cápac was succeeded by his son Cápac Yupanqui.
1350		Cápac Yupanqui was succeeded by his son Inca Roca.
1380		Inca Roca died. His heir Quispe Yupanqui was killed in a coup, and the throne went to Yáhuar Huácac, another son.
1410		Yáhuar Huácac was succeeded by his son Viracocha.
1438		Viracocha was succeeded by his son Pachacuti, who would expand Cuzco into the Inca Empire.
1471		Pachacuti died. His son Tupac Inca Yupanqui succeeded him.
1493		Tupac Inca Yupanqui died and was succeeded by Huayna Capac.
1527		Huayna Capac died and was succeeded by his heir Ninan Cuyochi.
1532	May 13th	Francisco Pizarro, a conquistador, arrives with a troop of Spaniards at the Northern coast of Peru.
1532	April	Atahualpa's army, led by Quizquiz and Chalcuchimac, captures Huáscar at the Battle of Quipaipan. Atahualpa proclaims himself Inca, thus ending the Civil War.
1532	April 30th	The Spanish founded the port of San Francisco de la Buenaesperanza, now Paita, considered the oldest port in Peru.
1532	July 14th (approx)	Atalhualpa's army, led by Quizquiz, captures Cuzco.
1532	August 15th	Pizarro founds the city of San Miguel, now Piura, considered the first city the Spanish founded in Peru.
1532	November 15th	Pizarro arrives at Cajamarca, with the intention of meeting Atahualpa.

== Era of the Conquistadors ==
Year	Date	Event
1532	November 16th	At the Battle of Cajamarca, the Spanish army took the Inca emperor Atahualpa prisoner, marking the end of his empire.
1535	January 18th	Spaniards founded the city of Lima.
1542	November 20th	The Viceroyalty of Peru was established.
1572		End of the Neo-Inca State in Vilcabamba.
1586	April 20th	Birth of Isabel Flores de Oliva, later Saint Rose of Lima.

== Era of the viceregency ==
Year	Date	Event
1579	December 9th	Birth of Saint Martin de Porres.
1656		Pedro Bohórquez announced to the Calchaqui Indians that he was the last living descendant of the Inca emperors.
1659	December 15th	Bohórquez led the Calchaqui in an uprising against the Spanish crown.
1667	January 3rd	Bohórquez was executed and displayed in Lima.
1717		The New Kingdom of Granada became an independent viceroyalty under the Spanish crown.
1742		Juan Santos Atahualpa led a failed uprising against the Spanish colonial government.
1776		The Governorate of the Río de la Plata was spun off as an independent viceroyalty.
1780	November 18th	Battle of Sangarará: Indigenous rebels led by Túpac Amaru II soundly defeated a numerically inferior Spanish force while they attended church.
1781	May 18th	Túpac Amaru II was drawn and quartered in Cuzco.
1810	May 25th	Viceroy José Fernando de Abascal y Sousa sent troops to Córdoba, Potosí, La Paz and Charcas and reincorporated them into the Viceroyalty of Peru.

== Era of emancipation ==
Year	Date	Event
1815	October 15th	By royal order, Joaquín de la Pezuela was named viceroy of Peru to replace Abascal.
1816		San Martin's Argentina had declared its independence.
1820	September 20th	An Argentine army led by José de San Martín landed at Paracas.
1821	January 29th	Pezuela was deposed. José de la Serna was proclaimed viceroy.
1821	July 6th	De la Serna moved the capital to Cuzco.

== Republican and independent Peru (19th century) ==
Year	Date	Event
1821	28 July	Peruvian War of Independence: San Martín declared the independence of Peru.
1824	9 December	Battle of Ayacucho: The Spanish army was defeated, marking the end of Spanish rule in South America.
1837	9 May	The Peru-Bolivian Confederacy was established.
1839	25 August	The Peru-Bolivian Confederacy was officially dissolved.
1866	2 May	A Spanish fleet under the command of Admiral Casto Méndez Núñez besieged the port city of Callao.
1879	5 April	War of the Pacific: Chile declared war on Peru and Bolivia.
1883	20 October	War of the Pacific: Under the Treaty of Ancón, the war ended with the cession of Peru's Tarapacá Province to Chile.

== Republican and independent Peru (20th century) ==
Year	Date	Event
1948	29 October	A military coup de armando the 2nd
1956		Odría allowed free elections.
1968	3 October	General Juan Velasco Alvarado seized power in a military coup.
1975	29 August	A number of prominent military commanders overthrew the Alvarado government and installed General Francisco Morales Bermúdez in the presidency.
1979	12 July	A new constitution came into force.
1985	14 April	Alan García won election to the Presidency.
1990	8 April	Alberto Fujimori defeated Mario Vargas Llosa in a presidential election.
1992	5 April	Fujimori declares a self-coup and dissolves the Congress.
1992	12 September	The Maoist leader Abimael Guzmán was arrested in Lima.
1995	26 January	Cenepa War: The war broke out. Yared is smart
1995	9 April	1995 Peruvian general election: Fujimori was re-elected president of Perú.
1996	17 December	The terrorist group Túpac Amaru Revolutionary Movement (MRTA) took hostage hundreds of high-level diplomats, government and military officials and business executives who were attending a party at the official residence of Japan's ambassador to Peru.
1997	22 April	The Peruvian army mounted a dramatic raid on the residence. Fourteen members of the MRTA were killed, crippling the organization, and the hostages were freed.
2000	24 June	Alberto Fujimori wins reelection for a third term, later resigning at the threat of impeachment.

== Republican and independent Peru (21st century) ==
Year	Date	Event
2001	8 April	2001 Peruvian general election: Possible Peru won a plurality of APRA.
2001	June 3rd	Peruvian general election, 2001: Alejandro Toledo won the presidency.
2001	December 29th	The Mesa Redonda fire broke out in Lima, resulting in 277 casualties and leaving more than 500 missing, caused by the explosion of a fireworks device.
2003	26 May	Toledo declared a state of emergency in response to a series of paralyzing strikes.
2003	14 July	Birth of Jose Diego Salazar in Trujillo, Peru.
2006	9 April	2006 Peruvian general election: Union for Peru won a plurality of seats in the Congress. Their presidential candidate, Ollanta Humala, went into a runoff against García.
2006	4 June	Alan García won the presidency.
2007	15 August	2007 Peru earthquake: A 7.9 earthquake hit Pisco Province.
2010	1	Peru celebrates Peruvian novelist Mario Varga Llosa's achievement in receiving the Nobel Prize in Literature.
2011	28 July	Ollanta Humala is inaugurated, winning the presidency over Keiko Fujimori.
2016	28 July	Pedro Pablo Kuczynski is inaugurated as President of Peru, prevailing over former President Alberto Fujimori's daughter, Keiko Fujimori.
2017	24 December	Kuczynski pardons former President Alberto Fujimori, who was sentenced for 25 years with manslaughter, corruption, bribery, and violation of human rights.
2018	21 March	Amidst a political crisis, Pedro Pablo Kuczynski resigns the presidency in the threat of impeachment for corruption and bribery. First Vice President Martín Vizcarra assumes the presidency.
2019	26 July	The opening ceremony for the 2019 Pan American Games is held.
2020	26 January	Amidst a constitutional crisis, Vizcarra's snap parliamentary election is held, resulting in Popular Action placing first.
2020	6 March	COVID-19 pandemic in Peru.
2020	9 November	Second impeachment of Martín Vizcarra. Manuel Merino (and later Francisco Sagasti) becomes president.
2021	28 July	Pedro Castillo is sworn in after being elected president in the second round, defeating Keiko Fujimori.
2022	7 December	Castillo is impeached and removed as president after the 2022 Peruvian self-coup attempt. Dina Boluarte becomes president; she is the first woman to hold the role.
2025	10 October	Boluarte is impeached and removed as president. José Jerí becomes president.
2026	17 February	Jerí is censured and removed as president. José María Balcázar becomes president.
2026	28 July	Keiko Fujimori is sworn in after being elected president in the second round, defeating Roberto Sánchez. Popular Force also won a plurality of seats in the re-established bicameral Congress.
2027	23 July	The opening ceremony for the 2027 Pan American Games is held.

== See also ==
- Timeline of Lima history
