= César Atahualpa Rodríguez =

César "Atahualpa" Rodriguez Olcay (August 26, 1889 – March 12, 1972) was a Peruvian poet; a self taught, cultural writer.

Born César Augusto Rodríguez Olcay in Arequipa, he took the pseudonym, "Atahualpa", after the Arequipan poet Percy Gibson. During the period of 1908–1913, he spent a lot of time with José María Eguren, Manuel González Prada and Abraham Valdelomar, writers of stature who praised his work and considered him "la nueva expresión de la lírica nacional”- the new expression of the national lyric.

At the end of 1916, along with Percy Gibson, Rodriguez founded the group "El Aquelarre" and published four issues of a magazine which bore the same name, initiatives that were an incentive for Arequipa intellectual life. "El Aquelarre" appeared around the same time as that the movement "Colónida" in Lima, the group "Norte" of Trujillo, and "La Tea" of Puno. However, the influence of "El Aquelarre" was especially Modernistic, Symbolistic and Parnassianistic. (See Parnassianism)

In 1917, he was appointed director of the public library of Arequipa, a post he held until 1955.

In 1926, Rodriguez's first book, La torre de las paradojas, was published by La Editorial Nuestra América de Buenos Aires. The book preceded one vast work in prose, as in verse and essay. According to Arequipa literary critic Titus Cáceres Cuadros, "Poetry of Rodriguez had enough social emotion and a strong regional accent."

In 1966, Congress decorated him with the highest laurels: la Orden del Sol del Perú y la Orden del Congreso, and the municipality of Arequipa awarded him the city gold medal. In the same year, Rodriguez published Sonatas en tono de Silencio, edited by the Ministry of Public Education. Centrally themed on the search for solitude as a means to become the primary source of his philosophical writings, the book brought together poems that are representative of the sophistication of the poet.

== Works ==
- La torre de las paradojas (1926)
- Poemas (1940)
- Sonatas en tono de silencio (1966)
- Los últimos versos (1972).
