= Peru Secure Homeland =

Peruvian political party

Peru Secure Homeland Perú Patria Segura
- Abbreviation: PPS
- President: Andrés Reggiardo
- Secretary: Renzo Reggiardo
- Founder: Renzo Reggiardo; Andrés Reggiardo
- Founded: 26 September 2013
- Dissolved: 7 September 2021
- Preceded by: Cambio 90
- Ideology: Majority: Christian democracy Liberal conservatism Economic liberalism Factions: Fujimorism
- Political position: Centre-right

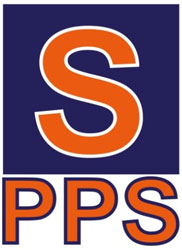
First logo of Peru Secure Homeland

Peru Secure Homeland (Spanish: Perú Patria Segura) was a centre-right Peruvian political party founded on 26 September 2013 by former members of the defunct Cambio 90, founded by former President Alberto Fujimori in 1990. It lost its registration as a political party in September 2021, ceasing to exist after failing to pass the threshold at the 2021 general election.

== History ==
Debuting in national politics in the 2014 local and regional elections, Peru+ leader Salvador Heresi was invited to be the party's nominee for Mayor of Lima, finishing in fourth place with 5.9% of the popular vote, losing to Luis Castañeda of the National Solidarity.

In 2016, Renzo Reggiardo ran as a candidate for the presidency of Peru under the Peru Secure Homeland, but decided to withdraw his candidacy, after denouncing that there are candidates "plagued with irregularities."

In the 2018 local and regional election, leader Renzo Reggiardo was the party's nominee for Mayor of Lima. Leading most of the polls throughout the entire campaign, Reggiardo's absence in the mayoral debate proved the decisive in the rise of candidates Jorge Muñoz and Daniel Urresti, and subsequently lost the election, placing third with 8.9% of the popular vote.

In the 2020 snap parliamentary election, the party won 2.4% of the popular vote but no seats in the Congress of the Republic, as the party failed to pass the electoral threshold.

For the 2021 general elections, the party nominated former Mayor of Pueblo Libre, Rafael Santos for the Presidency with Victoria Paredes and Andres Reggiardo For the First and Second Vice Presidency.

== Origin ==
With the name change of the party, in addition to seeking to distance itself from Keiko Fujimori, it seeks to highlight the meaning of the word security, for aspects such as economic, legal, citizen and investment.

== Electoral history ==
=== Presidential elections ===
Year	Candidate	Party	Votes	Percentage	Outcome
2016	Renzo Reggiardo	Peru Secure Homeland	Ticket withdrawn	N/A	N/A
2021	Rafael Santos	Peru Secure Homeland	54,224	0.38	17th

=== Elections to the Congress of the Republic ===
Election	Votes	%	Seats	▲/▼	Position
2016	List withdrawn	N/A	N/A	Steady	N/A
2020	350 121	2.4%	0 / 130	Steady	N/A

=== Regional and municipal elections ===
Year	Regional Governors	Provincial Mayors	District Mayors
Year	Outcome	Outcome	Outcome
2014	0 / 25	0 / 195	4 / 1,647
2018	0 / 25	0 / 196	8 / 1,678
