= 1838 in Peru =

- Decades: 1810s; 1820s; 1830s; 1840s; 1850s
- See also: Other events in 1838 · Timeline of Peruvian history

Events in the year 1838 in Peru.

== Incumbents ==
- Supreme Protector of the Peru-Bolivian Confederation: Andres de Santa Cruz
- President of the Republic of North Peru: Luis Orbegoso until July 30, José de la Riva Agüero
- President of the Republic of South Peru: Ramón Herrera y Rodado until October 12, Juan Pío de Tristán y Moscoso

== Events ==
- January 12 and 13 - War of the Confederation: Battle of Islay
- July 30 - North Peru President Obregoso declares secession of his republic from the Peru-Bolivian Confederation.
- August 21 - Battle of Portada de Guías on the outskirts of Lima
- October - Chilean Army occupies Lima
- November 3 - Chileans abandon Lima
