= 1866 in Peru =

- Decades: 1840s; 1850s; 1860s; 1870s; 1880s
- See also: Other events in 1866 · Timeline of Peruvian history

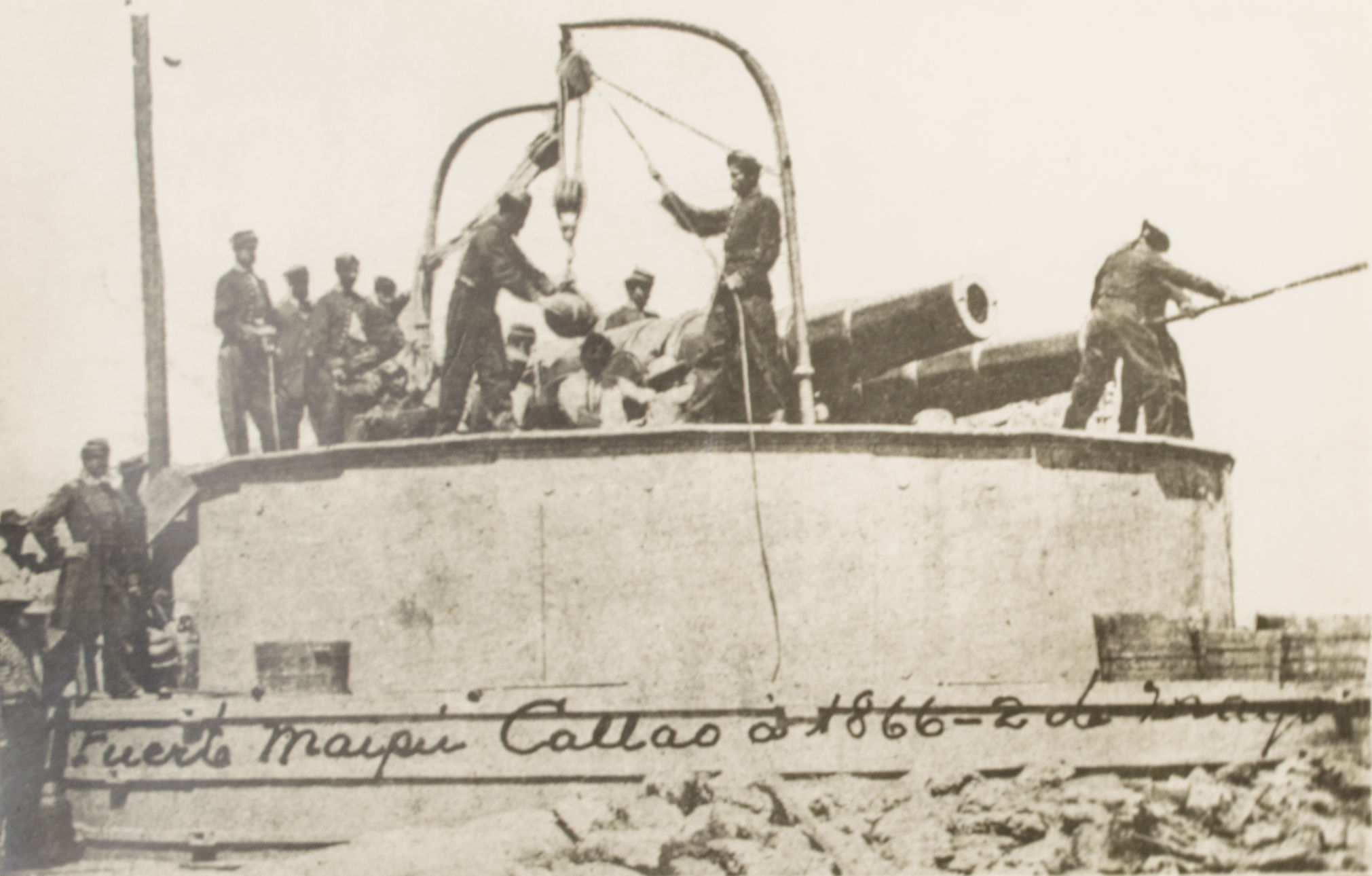
A Peruvian battery during the Battle of Callao (Peru) 1866

Events in the year 1866 in Peru.

== Incumbents ==
- President: Mariano Ignacio Prado

== Events ==
- May 2 - Chincha Islands War: Battle of Callao

== Births ==
- September 8: Amalia Puga de Losada, writer.
