= Siempre Unidos =

Siempre Unidos is the leading care provider for HIV-positive individuals in Honduras. It is a unique fusion of a local self-help group and a US-based not-for-profit, ensuring that the services provided are closely tied to the needs of the community and that the community has access to the resources and cutting-edge medicine of the United States.

== History ==
Siempre Unidos began in 1995 as a Honduran self-help group organized out of the Episcopal church. Rev Pascual Torres, Chancellor of the Episcopal Diocese of Honduras, helped organize and found it.

After Hurricane Mitch, volunteers from St. Stephen's Episcopal Church in Belvedere, CA came to Honduras to rebuild houses and help provide safe drinking water. When they discovered the Siempre Unidos self-help group, the life expectancy of members was 6 months. Dr. Denise Main began work creating a sister organization in the states to help organize and provide resources for the self-help groups.

== Clinics ==
Starting in 2003, the San Pedro Sula meeting area became a true clinic, offering medical care and triple anti-retroviral medications. By 2004, they had opened clinics in Siguatepeque and Roatan, growing to be one of the largest AIDS care providers in Honduras.

Patients cook and share free hot meals and provide support for each other. They have a dedicated staff of Honduran physicians and nurses, while a US HIV specialist visits every few months to evaluate especially complicated cases. Affordable anti-retroviral treatment is provided through the Honduran government and RAMP.

== Workshops ==
Now that they can expect to lead full, productive lives, Siempre Unidos members are faced with the prospect of finding employment. In Honduras, job discrimination against HIV-positive people is severe; it isn't uncommon for a large employer to force all employees to take HIV tests, firing all those that are positive.

As a result, Siempre Unidos has developed a variety of forms of employment for its members, including sewing and jeweling, guaranteeing a fair wage and safe, secure working conditions. The resulting products are sold in the United States under the SiempreSol brand, with profits returning to the clinics to expand access and services. SiempreSol is fair trade certified by the Fair Trade Federation.

The aim is to create a new model of sustainable AIDS care, where patients are able to pay for their own care.

== Outreach ==
Recognizing that the only way to end the epidemic is through stopping its spread, Siempre Unidos does extensive outreach and education, reaching the most at-risk groups—commercial sex workers, street children, and high school and university students.

Siempre Unidos is also one of the only organizations in Honduras that offers voluntary confidential and accurate HIV screenings.
