= 1867 in Peru =

- Decades: 1840s; 1850s; 1860s; 1870s; 1880s
- See also: Other events in 1867 · Timeline of Peruvian history

Events in the year 1867 in Peru.

== Incumbents ==
- President: Mariano Ignacio Prado

== Events ==
Peruvian Civil War of 1867

== Deaths ==
- May 30 - Ramón Castilla
