= 1848 in Peru =

- Decades: 1820s; 1830s; 1840s; 1850s; 1860s
- See also: Other events of 1848; Timeline of Peruvian history

Events in the year 1848 in Peru.

== Incumbents ==
- President: Ramón Castilla

== Events ==
=== February ===
- 8 February - The Treaty of Lima is signed.

=== Ongoing events ===
- Guano Era.

== Births ==
- 4 August - Domingo M. Almenara Butler (Died 1931)

== Deaths ==
=== Unknown ===
- Antonio Huachaca.
