= 1933 in Peru =

- Decades: 1910s; 1920s; 1930s; 1940s; 1950s
- See also: Other events in 1933 · Timeline of Peruvian history

Events in the year 1933 in Peru.

== Incumbents ==
- President: Luis Miguel Sánchez Cerro until April 30, Óscar R. Benavides
- Prime Minister:
  - until 29 June: José Matías Manzanilla Barrientos
  - 29 June-24 November: Jorge Prado y Ugarteche
  - starting 24 November: José de la Riva-Agüero y Osma

== Events ==
- February 14 - unsuccessful attempt by Peruvian Air Force to bomb the Colombian Navy
- April 30 - assassination of President Sánchez Cerro

== Publications ==
- María Wiesse: Nueve relatos (Nine stories).

== Births ==
- February 10: Jaime Guardia, singer and charango player.

== Deaths ==
- April 30 - Luis Miguel Sánchez Cerro, President, assassination
