= Agenda Diplomática =

Magazine published in Lima, Peru

Agenda Diplomática is a bimonthly magazine published in Lima, Peru, best known for conducting interviews with diplomats. The magazine was founded in November 1989, at a difficult time in Peru but has managed to survive for more than 20 years in a country where many media publications of this type fail to hold for various reasons, including economic, political, and others.
