= 1941 in Peru =

- Decades: 1920s; 1930s; 1940s; 1950s; 1960s
- See also: Other events in 1941 · Timeline of Peruvian history

The following lists events that happened during 1941 in the Republic of Peru.

== Incumbents ==
- President: Manuel Prado Ugarteche
- First Vice President: Rafael Larco Herrera
- Second Vice President: Carlos D. Gibson
- Prime Minister: Alfredo Solf y Muro

== Events ==
- July 5–31 - Ecuadorian–Peruvian War

== Publications ==
=== Story ===
- María Wiesse: Aves nocturnas

== Births ==
- October 27: Rodolfo Hinostroza, poet and astrologer.
- November 10: Ricardo Silva Santisteban, poet and translator.
- December 18: Luis Hernández, poet.

== Deaths ==
- July 23 - José Quiñones Gonzales
