= Miss Perú 1972 =

- Date: July 6, 1972
- Presenters: Pepe Ludmir
- Venue: Teatro Municipal (Lima)
- Broadcaster: Panamericana Televisión
- Entrants: 24
- Winner: Carmen Amelia Ampuero; Distrito Capital

The Miss Perú 1972 pageant was held on July 6, 1972. That year, 24 candidates were competing for the national crown. The chosen winner represented Peru at the Miss Universe 1972. The rest of the finalists would enter in different pageants.

== Placements ==
Final Results	Contestant
Miss Peru Universe 1972	Distrito Capital – Carmen Amelia Ampuero
1st Runner-Up	(United States) USA Perú - Techy Raa-Schaefer
2nd Runner-Up	Callao - Elvira Steinbach
Top 6	La Libertad - Lourdes de Orbegozo; Tumbes - Roxana Páez; Tacna - Panchita Piedra
Top 12	San Martín - Nina Fernández; Piura - Marisol Beraun; Ica - Patricia Fuller; Amazonas - Kristen Gambetta; Cuzco - Hellen Mur; Madre de Dios - Nancy Simón Rivera

== Special awards ==
- Best Regional Costume - Lambayeque - Victoria Massi
- Miss Photogenic - Distrito Capital - Carmen Amelia Ampuero
- Miss Body - Madre de Dios - Nancy Simón Rivera
- Best Hair - San Martín - Nina Fernández
- Miss Congeniality - Huánuco - Erika Miovich
- Miss Elegance - Distrito Capital - Carmen Amelia Ampuero

.

== Delegates ==
- Amazonas - Kristen Gambetta
- Áncash - Bertha Morales
- Apurímac - Sara Flores Paredes
- Ayacucho - Silvia Bedoya
- Cajamarca - Angelica Vigo
- Callao - Elvira Steinbach
- Cuzco - Hellen Mur
- Distrito Capital - Carmen Amelia Ampuero
- Europe Perú - Regina Lutmann
- Huancavelica - Ernestina Saenz
- Huánuco - Erika Miovich
- Ica - Patricia Fuller
- Junín - Guiliana Prieto
- La Libertad - Lourdes de Orbegozo
- Lambayeque - Victoria Massi
- Loreto - Susana Sanchez Caceres
- Madre de Dios - Nancy Simón Rivera
- Moquegua - Malena Astuariz
- Piura - Marisol Beraun
- Puno - Irma Villanueva
- San Martín - Nina Fernández
- Tacna - Panchita Piedra
- Tumbes - Roxana Páez
- USA Peru - Techy Raa-Schaefer
