= Peru 2000 =

Peru 2000 Perú 2000
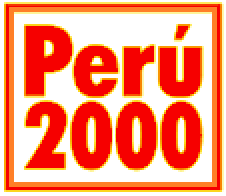
- Abbreviation: P2000
- Leader: Alberto Fujimori
- Founder: Alberto Fujimori
- Founded: 1999
- Dissolved: 2001
- Succeeded by: Cambio 90 – New Majority (majority); People's Solution (minority)
- Headquarters: Lima, Peru
- Ideology: Fujimorism
- Political position: Right-wing
- Members: Cambio 90; New Majority; Vamos Vecino; Juntos Sí Podemos

Party flag

Peru 2000 (Spanish: Perú 2000) was a Peruvian right-wing political alliance that fielded candidates for the 2000 general elections. Alberto Fujimori and his political allies ran on the Peru 2000 ticket in which, Fujimori was triumphant in his second re-election as president for a third term amid public discontent.

The party was loosely structured and was more of a personal electoral vehicle for Fujimori than an actual organized political coalition/alliance.

== History ==
In 1999, Alberto Fujimori decided to run for re-election for a third term in the 2000 general elections, after which he decided to create an alliance with his Fujimori parties Cambio 90, Nueva Mayoría, Siempre Unidos and Vamos Vecino, thus forming the "Alianza Electoral Perú 2000". During the 2000 elections in Peru, Chávez suggested that Fujimori would dissolve Congress if Peru 2000 did not win a majority of seats. She also said that she could not rule out a fourth election of Fujimori, despite the fact that the Constitution of Peru which was written in part by Chávez herself allows presidents to be elected no more than twice in a row. Indeed, Chávez had earlier promised that Fujimori would not run in the 2000 elections.

Fujimori competed with Alejandro Toledo of Possible Peru in the 1st and 2nd rounds and on May 28 of the same year, Fujimori was the winner in a controversial election marked by fraud, with which Peru 2000 entered congress with a majority, thanks to the defections of opposition congressmen.

In the legislative elections held on 9 April 2000, the alliance won 42.2% of the popular vote and 52 seats out of 120 in the Congress of the Republic.

=== Dissolution ===
In September 2000, the alliance began to lose ground due to the exhibition of the vladivideos. In one of them, the former presidential adviser, Vladimiro Montesinos, was shown handing over a large sum of money to Alberto Kouri, an opposition congressman, to join his ranks. After the corruption scandal, the coalition was losing its majority in the Congress of the Republic and the loss facilitated the removal of Fujimori from the Presidency, who disappeared completely in 2001.

== Electoral history ==
=== Presidential election ===
| Year | Candidate | Coalition | Votes | Percentage | Outcome |
|---|---|---|---|---|---|
| 2000 | Alberto Fujimori | Peru 2000 C90-NM-SU-SC | 1st Round: 5 528 568 | 1st Round: 49.87 | 1st Round: 1st |
| 2000 | Alberto Fujimori | Peru 2000 C90-NM-SU-SC | 2nd Round: 6 041 685 | 2nd Round: 74.33 | 2nd Round: 1st |

=== Elections to the Congress of the Republic ===
| Year | Votes | % | Number of seats | ▲/▼ | Position |
|---|---|---|---|---|---|
| 2000 | 4 189 019 | 42.2% | 52 / 120 | ▲52 | Minority |

== See also ==
- Cambio 90
- Sí Cumple
- Alliance for the Future (Peru)
