= 1938 in Peru =

- Decades: 1910s; 1920s; 1930s; 1940s; 1950s
- See also: Other events in 1938 · Timeline of Peruvian history

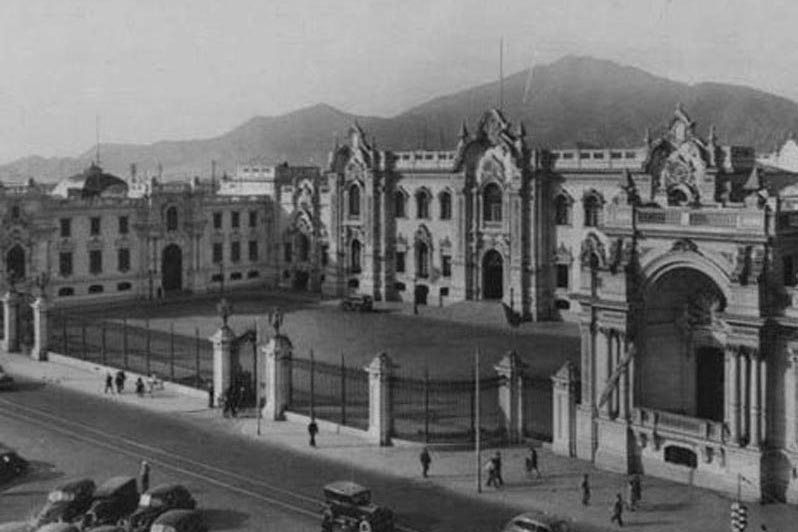
Peru's Government Palace in 1938

Events in the year 1938 in Peru.

== Incumbents ==
- President: Óscar R. Benavides
- First Vice President: Ernesto Montagne Markholz
- Second Vice President: Antonio Rodríguez Ramírez
- Prime Minister: Ernesto Montagne Markholz

== Events ==
- December 24 – The Lima Declaration is approved by 21 American countries, affirming the sovereignty of Latin American states.

== Births ==
- May 16 – Marco Aurelio Denegri, Peruvian linguist, intellectual and sexologist (died 2018)
- July 28 – Alberto Fujimori, President of Peru 1990–2000 (died 2024)

== Deaths ==
- April 15 - César Vallejo, poet (born 1892)

== See also ==
- 1938 Peruvian Primera División
