= Augusto Miyashiro =

Peruvian politician

Augusto Miyashiro Yamashiro (born 8 August 1949) is a Peruvian engineer and politician who has been the mayor of Chorrillos District five times, first from 1999 to 2002 under the Fujimorist Vamos Vecino, second from 2003 to 2006, third from 2007 to 2010, four from 2011 to 2014 and the last one from 2015 to 2018.

Miyashiro was born in Barranco District, Lima Province and he studied in San Francisco School.

Political offices
Preceded by Pablo Gutiérrez	Mayor of Chorrillos; 1999 – 2018	Succeeded by Augusto Miyashiro Ushikubo
