= 1990 in Peru =

- Decades: 1970s; 1980s; 1990s; 2000s; 2010s
- See also: Other events of 1990; Timeline of Peruvian history

This article lists events from the year 1990 in Peru.

== Incumbents ==
- President: Alan García (until 27 July), then Alberto Fujimori
- Prime Minister: Guillermo Larco Cox (until 28 July), then Juan Carlos Hurtado Miller

== Events ==
- 8 April – General election.
- 1 December–10 December – South American Games take place in Lima.

== Birth ==
- 25 July – Raúl Ruidíaz, footballer
