= Renzo Reggiardo =

Peruvian politician

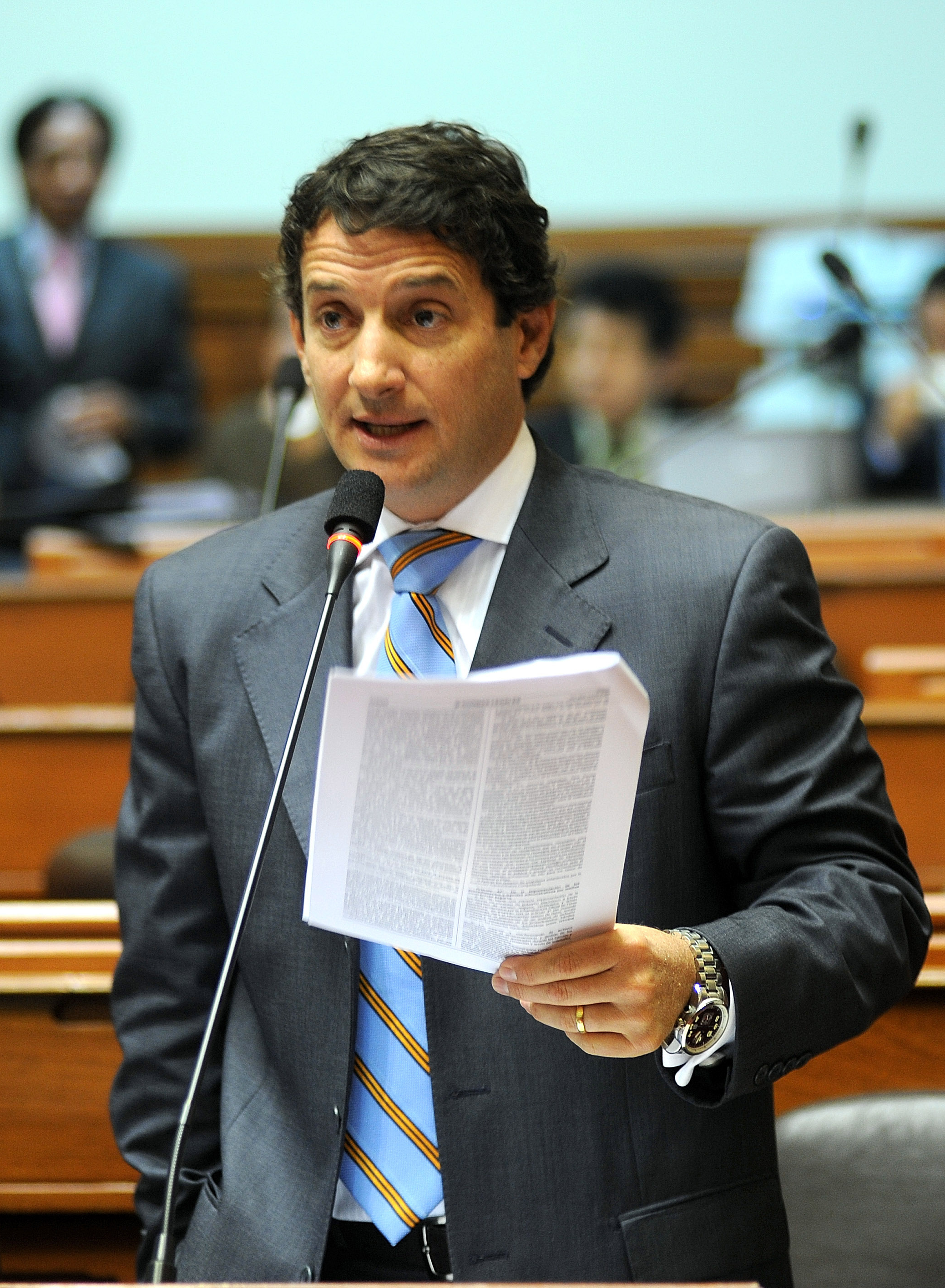

Mayor of Lima
- Incumbent
- Assumed office 13 October 2025
- Lieutenant: Fabiola Morales
- Preceded by: Rafael López Aliaga

Lieutenant Mayor of Lima
- In office 1 January 2023 – 13 October 2025
- Mayor: Rafael López Aliaga
- Preceded by: Miguel Romero Sotelo
- Succeeded by: Fabiola Morales

Member of Congress
- In office 26 July 2006 – 26 July 2016
- Constituency: Lima

General Secretary of Peru Secure Homeland
- In office 26 September 2013 – 7 September 2021

Personal details
- Born: Renzo Andrés Reggiardo Barreto; 1 July 1972 (age 54) Lima, Peru
- Party: Popular Renewal (since 2021)
- Other political affiliations: Cambio 90 (until 2013); Peru Secure Homeland (2013–2021)
- Parent: Andrés Reggiardo
- Education: University of San Martín de Porres

Renzo Andrés Reggiardo Barreto (born 1 July 1972) is a Peruvian businessman and Popular Renewal politician who has served as the Mayor of Lima since October 2025. A former Congressman, he represented the constituency of Lima for two terms from 2006 to 2016. From 2023 to 2025, Reggiardo served as Lieutenant Mayor of Lima under Mayor Rafael López Aliaga.

== Biography ==
Reggiardo is the son of the Italian-Peruvian Fujimorist politician Andrés Reggiardo. He graduated from the University of San Martín de Porres. A fact that aroused public and media attention was the criminal attack suffered by his wife and daughter, when they left their congressional office on August 4, 2011. After the events, he was elected as president of the new special commission on Citizen Security in Congress.

== Political career ==
=== Early political career ===
He joined his father's party Cambio 90 which was founded by his father and former President Alberto Fujimori and served as its National secretary of its youth branch from 2006 to 2010. In May 2010, he became the National secretary of Cambio 90.

=== Congressional career ===
In the 2006 general elections, Reggiardo was elected to the Congress for the 2006–2011 term, representing the city of Lima on the Fujimorist Alliance for the Future. When the ex-president's daughter Keiko Fujimori decided to form a new party, Force 2011, to promote her presidential candidacy for the 2011 presidential elections, Reggiardo did not follow. Instead, he added what was left of Cambio 90 to the National Solidarity Alliance and endorsed former Lima Mayor Luis Castañeda for the presidency. In the congressional vote, Reggiardo was re-elected in the constituency of Lima and as the only congressman from Cambio 90. Instead of joining with the rest of the representatives elected on the alliance's lists, Reggiardo now sits on the Parliamentary Coordination bench, together with the Peruvian Aprista Party's lawmakers and Carlos Bruce.

=== Post-congressional career ===
==== 2016 presidential campaign ====
In the 2016 presidential elections, he ran for President under the Peru Secure Homeland party, the successor of Cambio 90, but he withdrew from the race, as he claimed lack of credibility in the electoral process.

==== 2018 Lima mayoral election ====
Two years later in 2018, Reggiardo unsuccessfully ran for Mayor of Lima in the 2018 local elections. Leading most of the polls throughout the entire campaign, his absence in the mayoral debate caused him to finish in third place in the election with 8.9% of the popular vote, losing to Jorge Muñoz Walls of the Popular Action.

==== Mayor of Lima ====
Reggiardo took office as Mayor of Lima on 13 October 2025 upon the resignation of his predecessor Rafael López Aliaga.
