= Fujimorism =

Political ideology in Peru

Fujimorism Fujimorismo
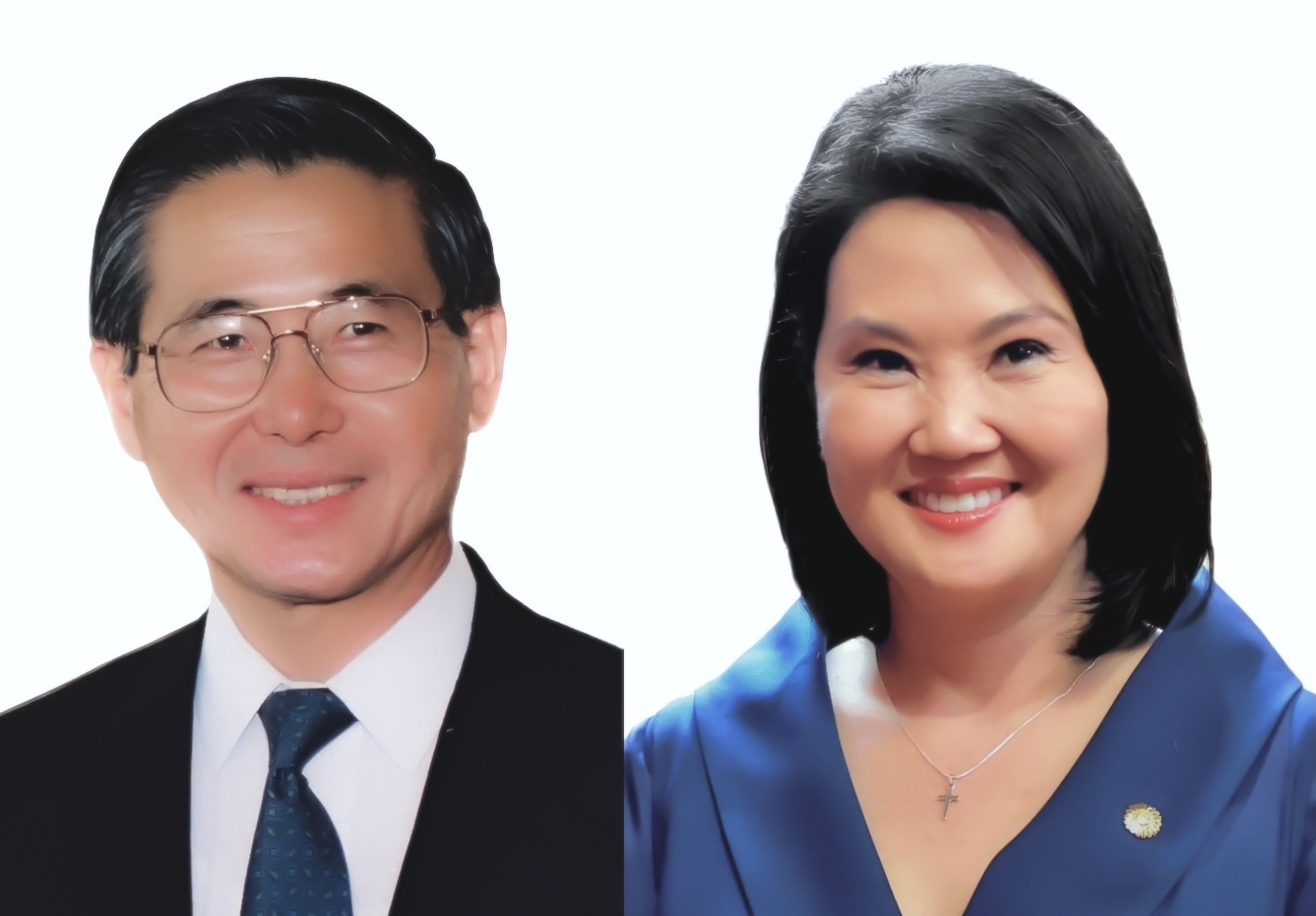
- Leader: Keiko Fujimori
- Founder: Alberto Fujimori
- Founded: 1989; 37 years ago
- Ideology: Communitarianism; Authoritarian conservatism; Right-wing populism; Neoliberalism (Peruvian); Anti-communism
- Political position: Right-wing to far-right
- National affiliation: Popular Force; Former: Cambio 90; New Majority; Sí Cumple
- Colours: Orange; Black

Fujimorism (Spanish: Fujimorismo) refers to the policies and the political ideology of former President of Peru Alberto Fujimori as well as the personality cult built around him, his policies, and his family, especially Keiko Fujimori, the current President of Peru. The ideology is defined by authoritarianism, its support for neoliberal economics, opposition to communism, and socially and culturally conservative stances, such as opposition to LGBT rights and school curriculums including gender equality and sex education. Opponents of Fujimorism are known as anti-Fujimorists.

Since Alberto Fujimori's election, Fujimorism has continued to maintain influence throughout Peru's institutions with the assistance of the 1993 constitution, its neoliberal policies and the support of extractivism. The movement was less politically relevant during the period after Alberto Fujimori's removal as President in 2000 until 2011, when Fujimorism regained political relevance through the activities of Alberto's children, Keiko and Kenji, with Keiko's party Popular Force controlling much of the Congress of the Republic of Peru from 2016 until 2020 through a system that was constitutionally drafted by her father. Since then, Fujimorism has obtained control of the majority of Peru's governing bodies, largely because other parties have been unable to secure a significant share of votes in general elections. Keiko was later elected Peru's president in 2026.

== History ==
=== 1990s ===
The lack of a stable political-party system in Peru as well as in other countries of Latin America has led many times to the emergence in the political arena of strong personalities without overt ideological affiliations. Fujimori was elected president in the 1990 election. Fujimori led the 1992 Peruvian self-coup, ostensibly directed against domestic terrorists. Following the 1992 crisis, Fujimori would broaden the definition of terrorism in an effort to criminalize as many actions as possible to persecute left-wing political opponents. Using the terruqueo, a fearmongering tactic that was used to accuse opponents of terrorism, Fujimori established a cult of personality by portraying himself as a hero and made left-wing ideologies an eternal enemy in Peru. Political scientist Daniel Encinas stated that the terruqueo would evolve into conservative politicians using the attack to target those opposed to Fujimori's neoliberal economic policies and that the right-wing used the tactic as a "strategy of manipulating the legacy of political violence".

In 1993, the Constitution of Peru was rewritten by Fujimori and his supporters and is currently used today. This constitution would later come to benefit Alberto Fujimori's children.

=== 2000s ===
Fujimori took refuge in Japan when faced with charges of corruption in 2000. On arriving in Japan, he attempted to resign his presidency via fax, but his resignation was rejected by the Congress of the Republic, which preferred to remove him from office by the process of impeachment. Fujimori maintained a self-imposed exile until he was arrested while visiting Chile in November 2005. He was extradited to face criminal charges in Peru in September 2007. In December 2007, Fujimori was convicted of ordering an illegal search and seizure, and was sentenced to six years in prison. The Supreme Court upheld the decision upon his appeal. In April 2009, Fujimori was convicted of human rights violations and sentenced to 25 years in prison for his role in killings and kidnappings by the Grupo Colina death squad during his government's battle against leftist guerrillas in the 1990s.

=== 2010s ===
Following Fujimori's fall from power, his self-exile to Japan, his extradition back to Peru and his subsequent trial and imprisonment, there emerged political parties that continued to proclaim to follow the legacy of Alberto Fujimori. The most prominent of these groups that formed in the aftermath of Alberto's downfall is Popular Force (Fuerza Popular), a political party that was created and is led by the former president's daughter Keiko Fujimori, a presidential candidate in 2011 and again in 2016.

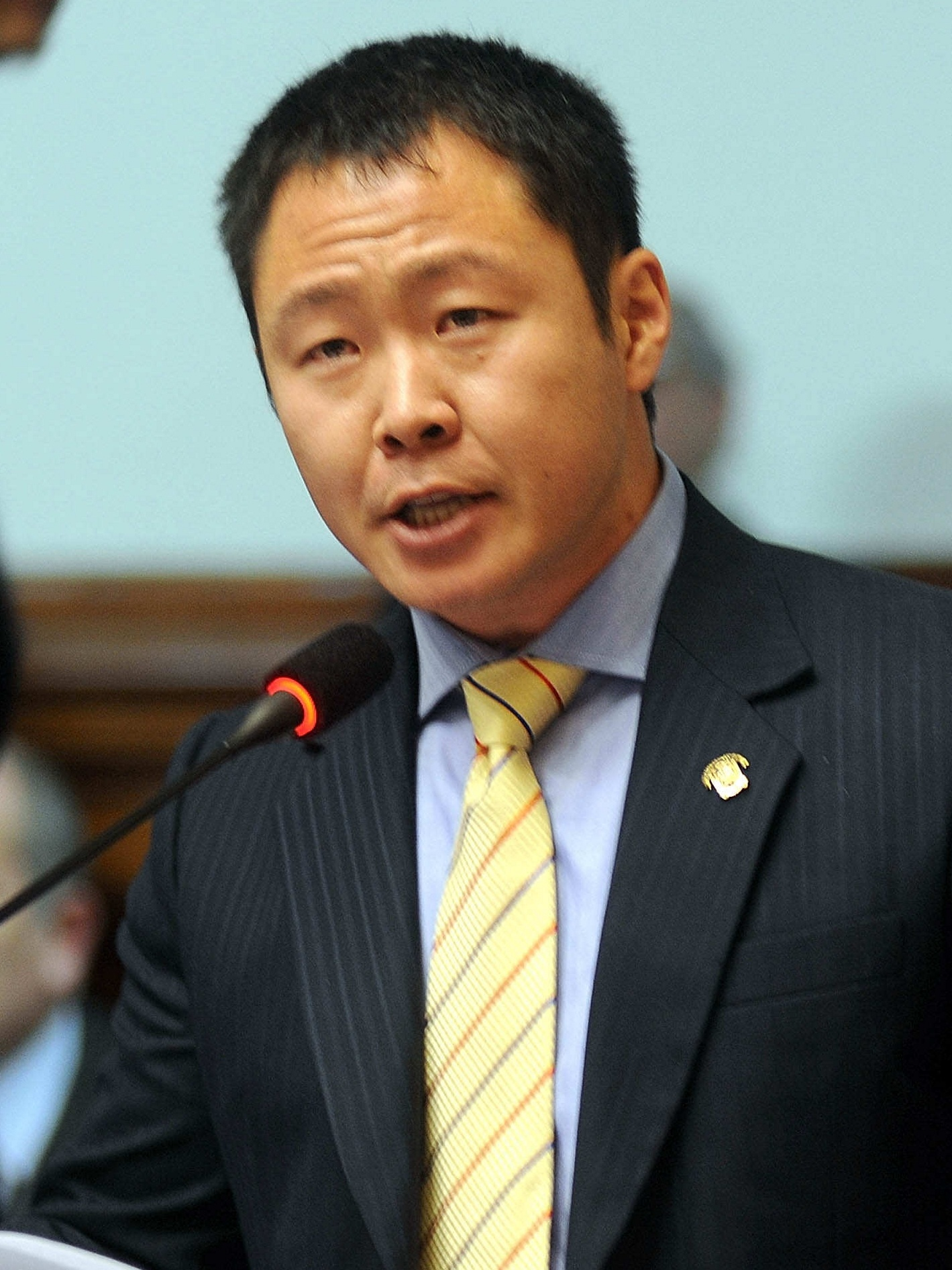
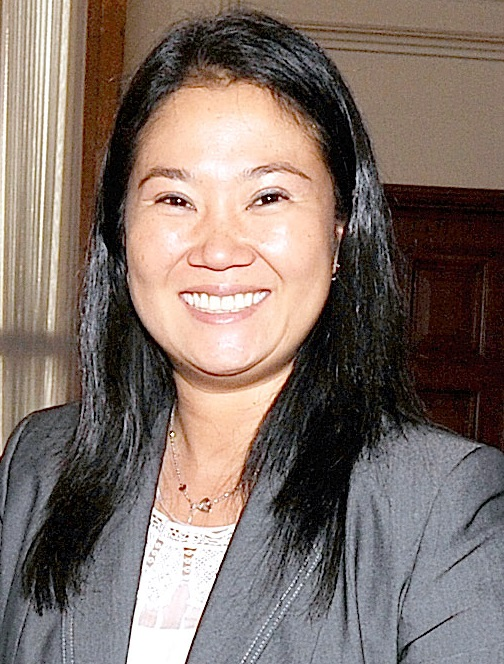
Kenji and Keiko Fujimori

In March 2017, Popular Force blocked an investigation into alleged sexual abuse within the Catholic church using the justification that it was only intended as an attack on religion.

As a result of the 2016 Peruvian general election, Keiko Fujimori lost the presidential race, though her Popular Force party gained control of Peru's congress while economist Pedro Pablo Kuczynski won the presidency. Shortly after the election, Fujimorist congress immediately began to politically attack President Kuczynski, beginning two impeachment proceedings against the president; a failed attempt in 2017 and another attempt in 2018.

Shortly after the first impeachment vote failed, President Kuczynski pardoned Alberto Fujimori, with Kuczynski citing Fujimori's health and age as the main reason for his pardoning. Days before the second vote was to occur, Kenji Fujimori – who was then still part of his sister's party Popular Force – was involved in the Kenjivideos scandal where he was seen attempting to buy the votes in favor of President Kuczynski to avoid the president's impeachment. As a result of the scandal, President Kuczynski resigned the presidency.

Following this series of events, First Vice President Martín Vizcarra was sworn into the presidency by the Fujimorist-led congress. During this ceremony, some Peruvians took to the streets to protest against the government, calling for the removal of all politicians. Others have stated that the attacks against President Kuczynski was a conspiracy of the Fujimorists to gain control of Peru's political system once more. Soon after taking office, President Vizcarra made attempts to remove corruption within Peru, proposing a national referendum effort surrounding the country's legislative branch and election funding 28 July 2018. On 3 October 2018, Alberto Fujimori's pardon was overturned by a Peruvian court and a week later on 10 October 2018, Keiko Fujimori was detained by police as part of an investigation surrounding the Odebrecht scandal and money laundering allegations that involved her 2011 presidential campaign. On 23 January 2019, Alberto Fujimori was sent back to prison to complete his sentence with his pardon formally being annulled three weeks later on 13 February 2019.

During their majority in congress, Fujimorists "earned a reputation as hardline obstructionists for blocking initiatives popular with Peruvians aimed at curbing the nation's rampant corruption" according to the Associated Press.

=== 2020s ===
During the 2021 Peruvian general election, the right-wing elite, business groups and the majority of media organizations in Peru collaborated with the campaign of Keiko Fujimori by appealing to fear when discussing political opponents. Media organizations in Peru would use the terruqueo along with fake news in an effort to support Fujimori. Reuters wrote that El Comercio, one of the largest media organizations in South America, "generally backed Fujimori". After Pedro Castillo was elected to the presidency, Fujimorists began to manipulate laws to prevent the dissolution of Congress and to solidify governing power within the legislature in which they succeeded in 2023, while Castillo himself was removed from Presidency in December 2022 after his self-coup attempt.

In 2023, Alberto Fujimori was pardoned. His supporters celebrated in several cities across the country, such as Iquitos, where a political caravan was organized. The following year, in 2024, the former convict joined Popular Force. The party's secretary-general, Luis Galarreta, considered his incorporation an "important act" in its history. Alberto Fujimori died that same year. Paulo Vilca noted that, at that moment, Keiko Fujimori "had consolidated herself as the sole reference of Fujimorism" and that Popular Force was "a disciplined machine that responded to a single leadership".

In her fourth attempt for the presidency, Keiko Fujimori won the 2026 Peruvian general election by a narrow margin, becoming the country's first elected female president.

== Ideology ==
Fujimorism is characterized by its social conservatism, having traits of authoritarianism and described as having a political position of being far-right. It is also known for strong opposition to left-wing and far-left groups. The principal foundations of the regime were staunch anti-communism, forceful anti-terrorist actions, pro-free market policies and disregard for political institutions. In terms of the decision-making process, a logic of closed and isolated decision-making at the top became the major characteristic of Fujimori governance.

Fujimorism is considered neoliberal economically as it minimized the role of the state functions through privatizations of public companies and by signing contracts with transnational companies to support foreign investment in large sectors. Peruvian sociologist Aníbal Quijano has described Fujimorism to have "fascistic" traits, though he distinguishes it from fascism due to its absence of a nationalist character, the mythology which it sways multitudes and the mass mobilization usually seen in mass movements.

== Parties and alliances ==
Self-proclaimed Fujimorist parties and electoral coalitions include Cambio 90 (1989–2013), New Majority (1992–2010), Sí Cumple (1997–2012), Peru 2000 (1999–2001), Alliance for the Future (2006), Popular Force (since 2010), and Peru Secure Homeland (2013–2021). Beginning in the late 2010s, the far-right "neo-fascist" group La Resistencia Dios, Patria y Familia, with links to Popular Renewal, participated in protests to support Fujimorist causes.

Keiko Fujimori's Popular Force has also allied with the conservative parties Advance Country of Hernando de Soto and Popular Renewal of Rafael López Aliaga, with the parties signing the Madrid Charter, an anti-leftist manifesto promoted by the far-right Spanish party Vox. Fujimorists have also allied themselves with leftist parties such as Free Peru, with the latter approaching Popular Force due to its power within governing institutions.

== Reception ==
Luis Pásara criticized that the parties Cambio 90 and Nueva Mayoría were not solid and merely served as support for leader Alberto Fujimori in the 1992 constituent elections.

Likewise, opposition politicians denounced numerous cases of corruption that occurred during the administration of former president Alberto Fujimori, especially in the second term (1995–2000). In 2001, at least 15 Fujimorists who had been elected as congressmen were constitutionally accused by the Permanent Commission.

Fujimorism is also criticized for encouraging and allowing its supporters to attack any political opponent. This aspect became very noticeable during the 2021 Peruvian electoral crisis, with the arrival of Pedro Castillo to the presidency. In 2024, former president Pedro Pablo Kuczynski blamed Keiko Fujimori for initiating the political crisis between 2016 and 2020, precisely when Kuczynski assumed the presidency by majority vote.

In 2025, CPI indicated that 37.8% of respondents nationwide considered Fujimorism to be the "most inefficient and corrupt" grouping in the Congress of the Republic.

== Fujimori family ==
=== Alberto Fujimori ===
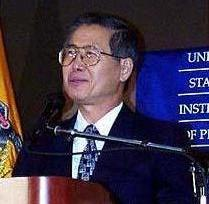
Alberto Fujimori in 1999

Alberto Fujimori was the patriarch of the family that bears his surname. Alberto was historically the main figure of the Fujimorist movement. The Fujimori surname comes from Kintaro Fujimori, Alberto's father, who had emigrated from Japan to Peru years before his son's birth.

=== Keiko Fujimori ===
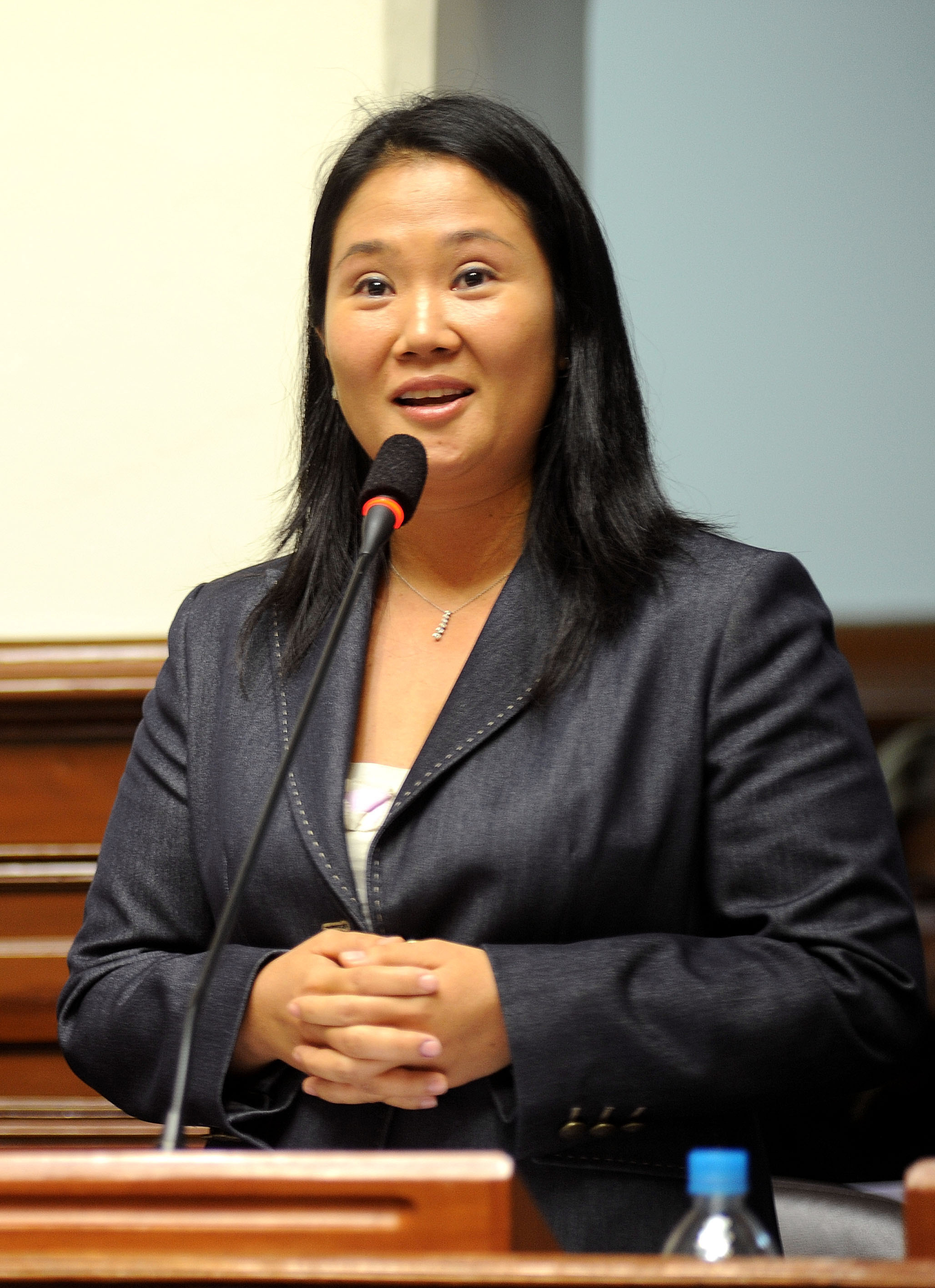
Keiko Fujimori as congresswoman in 2010

Keiko Fujimori studied business administration at Stony Brook University. In 2006, she ran for Congress with the coalition Alliance for the Future and was elected for the 2006–2011 period, receiving the highest vote total (more than 600,000 votes according to official counts from the ONPE).

In a 2012 interview, Keiko acknowledged that her father was a "good caudillo" and that he had refused to join any political party during his government. She added that her father later ceded his power to build Popular Force.

=== Kenji Fujimori ===
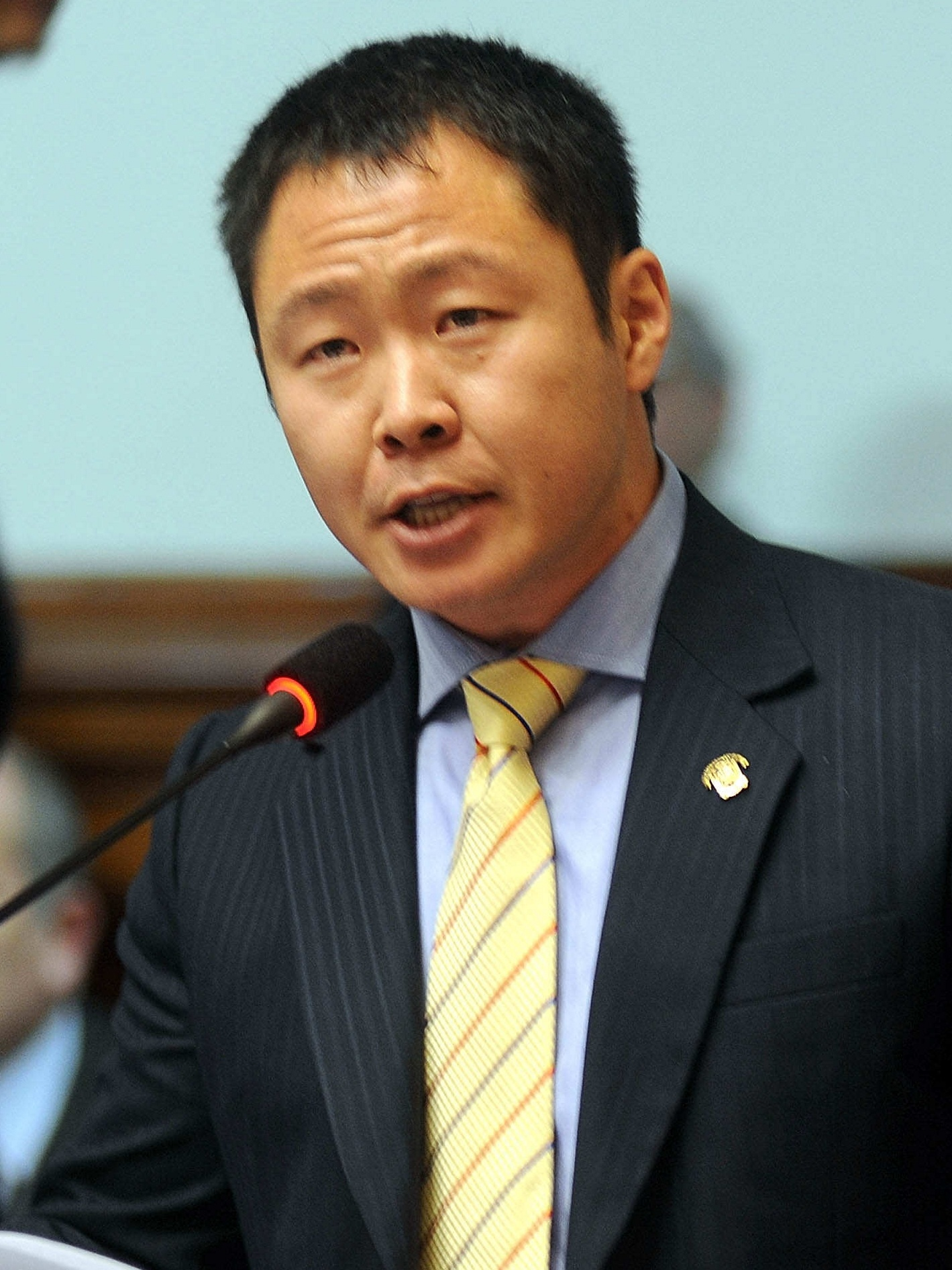
Kenji Fujimori as congressman in 2018

Former first lady Keiko Fujimori's younger brother, Kenji Fujimori, resigned in 2018 from Popular Force. Together with nine other congressmen expelled from the same party for abstaining in the vote on the presidential vacancy process against President Pedro Pablo Kuczynski the previous year, he formed the Cambio 21 caucus, which had a more progressive than conservative ideology. Cambio 21 was recognized by the President of Congress Daniel Salaverry, with the hope that the caucus would become a political party similar to the former Fujimorist party Sí Cumple.

== See also ==
- Fujimorist propaganda
- Democratic Bloc (Peru)
- National Intelligence Service (Peru)
- Vladimiro Montesinos

=== Similar ideologies ===
- Berlusconism
- Bolsonarism
- Cartismo
- Dutertismo
- Orbanism
- Mileism
- Pinochetism
- Putinism
- Trumpism
- Uribism

== Bibliography ==
- Meléndez, Carlos (2019). "La derecha que se bifurca. Las vertientes populista-conservadora y tecnocrática-liberal en Perú post-2000" [The right that bifurcates: the populist-conservative and technocratic-liberal currents in post-2000 Peru]. Colombia Internacional (99): 3–27. doi:10.7440/colombiaint99.2019.01.
- Mainwaring, Scott & Ana Maria Bejarano. The Crisis of Democratic Representation in the Andes; Stanford University Press; 2006; ISBN 978-0804752787
- Lawson, Kay & Jorge Lanzaro. Political Parties and Democracy: Volume I: The Americas; Praeger; 2010; ISBN 978-0313383144
