= List of Congresspeople of Peru (2006–2011) =

The following is a list of congress people of Peru for the parliamentary period of 2006–2011.

== Political parties ==
| Full Name | Abbrev. | Seats |
|---|---|---|
| Union for Peru | UPP | 45 |
| Alianza Popular Revolucionaria Americana | APRA | 36 |
| Unidad Nacional | UN | 17 |
| Alliance for the Future | AF | 13 |
| Center Front | FC | 5 |
| Possible Peru | PP | 2 |
| National Restoration | RN | 2 |

== Politicians ==
| Region | Member | Party |
|---|---|---|
| Amazonas | José Maslucan | UPP |
| Amazonas | Fabiola Salazar | APRA |
| Ancash | José Anaya | UPP |
| Ancash | María Balta | APRA |
| Ancash | Wilder Calderón | APRA |
| Ancash | José Mallqui | UN |
| Ancash | Fredy Otárola | UPP |
| Apurímac | Cayo Galindo | UPP |
| Apurímac | Antonio León | UPP |
| Arequipa | Juan Carlos Eguren | UN |
| Arequipa | Rocío González | UPP |
| Arequipa | Álvaro Gutiérrez | UPP |
| Arequipa | Lourdes Mendoza | APRA |
| Arequipa | Pedros Santos | UPP |
| Ayacucho | Juana Huancahuari | UPP |
| Ayacucho | Elizabeth León | UPP |
| Ayacucho | José Antonio Urquizo | UPP |
| Cajamarca | Werner Cabrera | UPP |
| Cajamarca | Alejandro Rebaza | APRA |
| Cajamarca | Cecilia Chacón | AF |
| Cajamarca | Eduardo Espinoza | UPP |
| Cajamarca | Rosa Florián | UN |
| Callao | Luis Giampietri | APRA |
| Callao | Isaac Mekler | UPP |
| Callao | Luis Negreiros | APRA |
| Callao | Martín Pérez | UN |
| Cusco | Oswaldo Luizar | UPP |
| Cusco | Víctor Mayorga | UPP |
| Cusco | María Sumire | UPP |
| Cusco | Hilaria Supa | UPP |
| Cusco | Luis Wilson | APRA |
| Huancavelica | Miro Ruiz | UPP |
| Huancavelica | José Saldaña | UPP |
| Huánuco | Karina Beteta | UPP |
| Huánuco | Yaneth Cajahuanca | UPP |
| Huánuco | Aníbal Huerta | APRA |
| Ica | Edgar Núñez | APRA |
| Ica | Luis Gonzales Posada | APRA |
| Ica | Isaac Serna | UPP |
| Ica | Rafael Yamashiro | UN |
| Junín | Martha Acosta | UPP |
| Junín | Elsa Canchaya | UN |
| Junín | Ricardo Pando | AF |
| Junín | Edgard Reymundo | UPP |
| Junín | Nidia Vílchez | APRA |
| La Libertad | Mario Alegría | APRA |
| La Libertad | Luis Alva Castro | APRA |
| La Libertad | Tula Benites | APRA |
| La Libertad | Francisco Escudero | UPP |
| La Libertad | Daniel Robles | APRA |
| La Libertad | Elías Rodríguez | APRA |
| La Libertad | Wilson Urtecho | UN |
| Lambayeque | Alejandro Aguinaga | AF |
| Lambayeque | Franco Carpio | UN |
| Lambayeque | Gustavo Espinoza | UPP |
| Lambayeque | Luis Falla | APRA |
| Lambayeque | Javier Velásquez | APRA |
| Lima | Daniel Abugattás | UPP |
| Lima | Lourdes Alcorta | UN |
| Lima | Alberto Andrade | FC |

| Region | Member | Party |
|---|---|---|
| Lima | Javier Bedoya | UN |
| Lima | Carlos Bruce | PP |
| Lima | Mercedes Cabanillas | APRA |
| Lima | Raúl Castro Stagnaro | UN |
| Lima | Luisa María Cuculiza | AF |
| Lima | Jorge Del Castillo | APRA |
| Lima | Keiko Fujimori | AF |
| Lima | Santiago Fujimori | AF |
| Lima | Luis Galarreta | UN |
| Lima | Víctor Andrés García Belaúnde | FC |
| Lima | Julio Herrera | APRA |
| Lima | Martha Hildebrandt | AF |
| Lima | Alda Lazo | RN |
| Lima | Luciana León | APRA |
| Lima | Guido Lombardi | UN |
| Lima | José Luna | UN |
| Lima | Walter Menchola | UN |
| Lima | Martha Moyano | AF |
| Lima | Mauricio Mulder | APRA |
| Lima | Gabriela Pérez del Solar | UN |
| Lima | Carlos Raffo | AF |
| Lima | Renzo Reggiardo | AF |
| Lima | Rosario Sasieta | FC |
| Lima | Juvenal Silva | UPP |
| Lima | Rolando Sousa | AF |
| Lima | Carlos Torres Caro | UPP |
| Lima | Cenaida Uribe | UPP |
| Lima | Javier Valle Riestra | APRA |
| Lima | Rafael Vásquez | UPP |
| Lima | José Vega | UPP |
| Lima | David Waisman | PP |
| Lima | César Zumaeta | APRA |
| Loreto | Víctor Isla | UPP |
| Loreto | Mario Peña | FC |
| Loreto | José Augusto Vargas | APRA |
| Madre de Dios | Juan Perry | RN |
| Moquegua | Hilda Guevara | APRA |
| Moquegua | Washington Zeballos | UPP |
| Pasco | Oswaldo de la Cruz | AF |
| Pasco | Gloria Ramos | UPP |
| Piura | José Carrasco | APRA |
| Piura | Marisol Espinoza | UPP |
| Piura | Miguel Guevara | APRA |
| Piura | Fabiola Morales | UN |
| Piura | Jhony Peralta | APRA |
| Piura | Rosa Venegas | UPP |
| Puno | Alfredo Cenzano | APRA |
| Puno | Aldo Estrada | UPP |
| Puno | Yonhy Lescano | FC |
| Puno | Margarita Sucari | UPP |
| Puno | Susana Vilca | UPP |
| San Martín | Nancy Obregón | UPP |
| San Martín | Aurelio Pastor | APRA |
| San Martín | Rolando Reátegui | AF |
| Tacna | Jorge Flores | APRA |
| Tacna | Juvenal Ordoñez | UPP |
| Tumbes | Carlos Cánepa | UPP |
| Tumbes | Franklin Sánchez | APRA |
| Ucayali | José Macedo | APRA |
| Ucayali | Roger Najar | UPP |
