= Martín Rivas =

Martín Rivas may refer to:

- Martín Rivas (footballer, born 1977), former Uruguayan footballer
- Martiño Rivas (born 1985), also known as Martín Rivas, Spanish actor
- Martín Rivas (footballer, born 1992), Uruguayan footballer
- Martín Rivas Texeira (born 1969), Peruvian politician and lawyer
- Martín Rivas (film), a 1925 Chilean silent film
- Martín Rivas (novel), an 1862 novel by Alberto Blest Gana
- Martín Rivas (TV series), a Chilean telenovela
