= Pando =

Pando may refer to:

== People ==
- Pando of Capua (died 862 or 863), "Pando the Rapacious", Count of Capua
- Gabriela Pando (1970–2024), Argentine field hockey player
- Irina Pando (born 1995), Swiss footballer
- José Manuel Pando (1849–1917), 29th President of Bolivia
- Juan Pando (born 1943), Spanish historian
- Martín Pando (1934–2021), Argentine footballer
- Ricardo Pando, Peruvian politician
- Pando, bass player for A Flock of Seagulls

== Places ==
- José Manuel Pando Province, a province of La Paz Department, Bolivia
- Pando Department, Bolivia
- Pando, Colorado, a ghost town in the United States
- Pando, Uruguay, a town in Canelones, Uruguay
- Pando Creek, a body of water in Canelones, Uruguay

== Other uses ==
- Apostolic Vicariate of Pando, of the Roman Catholic church, located in Riberalta, Bolivia
- Pando (application), a proprietary peer-to-peer file-sharing computer program, based on the BitTorrent protocol
- Pando Health an app used in the British NHS
- Pando (tree), an aspen tree colony in Utah which is several thousand years old
- Pando (news site), an online Silicon Valley news site
- Taking of Pando, the occupation of the Uruguayan city of Pando by the Tupamaros in 1969

== See also ==
- Jenny Pandos (disappeared 1987), American missing person
- Panda (disambiguation)
- Pandoc, a free-software document converter
- Ponda (disambiguation)
