= Antonio León =

- Antonio León Amador, Spanish footballer
- Antonio León Ortega, Spanish sculptor
- Antonio León Zapata, Peruvian congressman
- Antonio de León y Gama, Mexican astronomer, anthropologist and writer
- Antonio Leon (swimmer), Paraguayan swimmer
- Antonio León (soldier), active in the Battle of Molino del Rey
