= Gloria Ramos =

Gloria Ramos may refer to:

- Gloria Ramos (politician)
- Gloria Ramos (actress)
