= Huancahuari =

Huancahuari is a surname, and may refer to:

Huancahuari derives from huanca which means rock in Quechua or in reference to Huanca people and huari which means vicuña or in reference to the Huari people.

- Juana Huancahuari - Peruvian politician
- Pánfilo Amilcar Huancahuari Tueros - mayor of Ayacucho from 2010 to 2014
