= Álvaro Gutiérrez =

Álvaro Gutiérrez may refer to:

- Álvaro Gutiérrez (politician), Peruvian politician
- Álvaro Gutiérrez (footballer) (born 1968), former Uruguayan football midfielder
