= Rocío González =

Rocío González may refer to:

- Rocío González Navas (born 1953), First Lady of Ecuador
- Rocío González (politician), Peruvian Congresswoman
- Rocío González (athlete), Mexican competitor at events such as the 2000 NACAC Under-25 Championships in Athletics
