= Urtecho =

Urtecho is a surname. Notable people with the surname include:

- José Coronel Urtecho (1906–1994), Nicaraguan poet,
- Michael Urtecho (born 1969), Peruvian engineer
