= José Vargas =

José Vargas or Jose Vargas may refer to:

- José Vargas (baseball) (1905–?), Cuban baseball player
- José Vargas (basketball) (born 1963), Dominican basketball player
- Jose "Joe" Vargas, American YouTuber also known as "Angry Joe"
- Jose Antonio Vargas (born 1981), journalist, filmmaker and immigration rights activist
- José Augusto Vargas, Peruvian politician
- José Gregorio Vargas (born 1982), Venezuelan basketball player
- José Lino Vargas (born 1930), Chilean politician
- José María Vargas (1786–1854), President of Venezuela from 1835 to 1836
- José Dorángel Vargas Gómez (born 1957), Venezuelan serial killer and cannibal
- Angry Joe (born 1984), American Youtuber

== See also ==
- Joseph Vargas (born 1955), American former water polo player
