= Carmen Rosa Núñez =

Peruvian politician and entrepreneur

Carmen Rosa Núñez Campos

Member of Congress
- In office 6 January 2014 – 26 July 2016
- Preceded by: Michael Urtecho
- Constituency: La Libertad

Personal details
- Born: 11 May 1954 (age 72) Chota District, Peru
- Party: Democratic Force; National Solidarity Party
- Spouse: César Acuña Peralta (divorced)
- Children: Richard Acuña
- Education: National University of Trujillo
- Occupation: Entrepreneur, politician

Carmen Rosa Núñez Campos (born 11 May 1954) is a Peruvian politician and entrepreneur in the field of education. In December 2013, she was accredited by the national jury of elections as a member of the Congress of the Republic for the National Solidarity Party, after congressman Michael Urtecho was removed from office. She represented the Department of La Libertad from 2014 to 2016.

== Biography ==
Carmen Rosa Núñez Campos was born in Chota District on 11 May 1954. She is the ex-wife of politician César Acuña Peralta and mother of congressman Richard Acuña. She earned a Bachelor of Education degree from the National University of Trujillo. As an educational entrepreneur, she founded Cesar Vallejo University with César Acuña, and she manages one of its subsidiaries in Piura.

== Political life ==
In 2002, Rosa Núñez ran for mayor of the Víctor Larco Herrera District in Trujillo, representing the Democratic Force party and receiving 7.74% of the votes. She was nominated for the Congress of the Republic in the 2011 general election, representing the Department of La Libertad for the National Solidarity.

In mid-2013, a complaint was made against Núñez for trespassing on a piece of land valued at $100,000 in Trujillo's La Encalada area, and subsequently also denounced for trespassing on a piece of land of more than 1,000 square meters in Puerto Morín.

In December 2013, she was accredited by the national jury of elections to occupy the congressional seat formerly occupied by Michael Urtecho, representing La Libertad for the National Solidarity party. She served in this capacity until 27 July 2016 as she was defeated for re-election in the 2016 elections in which she ran under the Peruvians for Change.

She ran for mayor of Trujillo in the 2018 municipal election, losing to Daniel Marcelo.
