= Richard Acuña =

Peruvian politician and a Congressman

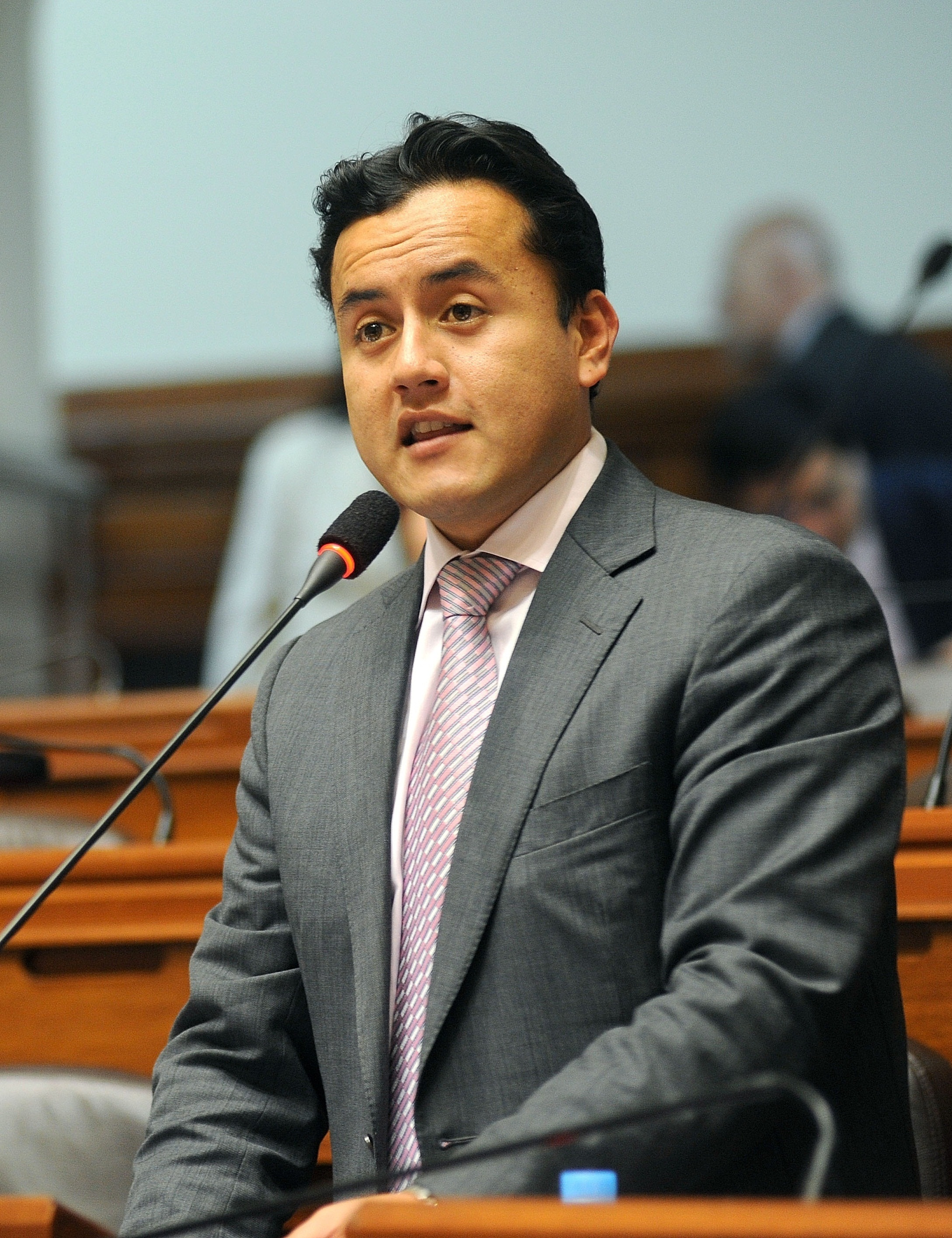

Member of Congress
- In office 26 July 2011 – 30 September 2019
- Constituency: La Libertad

Personal details
- Born: 18 September 1984 (age 41)
- Party: Alliance for Progress
- Relatives: César Acuña (father); Rosa Núñez (mother)
- Profession: Politician

Richard Frank Acuña Núñez (born 18 September 1984) is a Peruvian politician and a former Congressman representing La Libertad between 2011 and 2019. He was elected first in the 2011 elections and was re-elected in 2016.

== Biography ==
He ran for the Congress of the Republic in the 2011 elections, representing the La Libertad Region and was elected deputy representing the "Alliance for the Great Change", being the second most voted candidate in his region, with a total of 74,789 votes.

During his first term, he was president of the Commission for Decentralization, Regionalization, Local Governments and Modernization of State Management and of the Youth Subcommittee, belonging to the Commission for Education, Youth and Sports. In addition, he was a member of the Budget and General Account commissions of the Republic; Agrarian; Science, innovation and technology; Culture and Cultural Heritage; Education, Youth and Sports; as well as the Labor and Social Security Commission.

In 2016, he ran again for the Congress of the Republic for the national political party Alianza Para el Progreso (APP). By a wide margin, he was the most voted deputy in the department of La Libertad. He was Second Vice President of the board of directors of the National Parliament for the Annual Period of Sessions 2017–2018, the same position he held during the period 2016 – 2017. After the dissolution of Congress decreed by President Vizcarra, his congressional position passed until 30 September 2019.
