= Peruvian Democratic Party =

Political party in Peru

Peruvian Democratic Party Partido Demócrata Peruano
- Leader: Carlos Torres Caro
- Founder: Carlos Torres Caro
- Founded: 26 June 2006
- Split from: Union for Peru

The Peruvian Democratic Party (Spanish: Partido Demócrata Peruano, PDP) is a Peruvian political party founded on 26 June 2006 by former Union for Peru (UPP) members following differences within the party.

Elected Congress members Carlos Torres Caro, Gustavo Espinoza and Rocío González left UPP after the defeat of the party's presidential ticket, led by Ollanta Humala and featuring Torres Caro as a candidate to Second Vice-President, in the Second Round (runoff) of the 2006 national election. The rift arose when Humala called on radical left groups to join a "People's Democratic and Nationalist Front" ("Frente Nacionalista Democrático y Popular"), to be led by UPP and Humala's own Peruvian Nationalist Party.

Torres Caro is the party's leader and most prominent member, having not only been on UPP's presidential ticket, but also having obtained the most individual votes from UPP's congressional candidates.
