= Franklin Sánchez =

Peruvian politician

Member of Congress
- In office 26 July 2006 – 26 July 2011
- Constituency: Tumbes

Personal details
- Party: Peruvian Aprista Party
- Occupation: Politician

Franklin Humberto Sánchez Ortiz is a Peruvian politician and a Congressman representing Tumbes for the 2006–2011 term. Sánchez belongs to the Peruvian Aprista Party.
