= Miró Ruiz =

Peruvian politician

Miro Ruiz
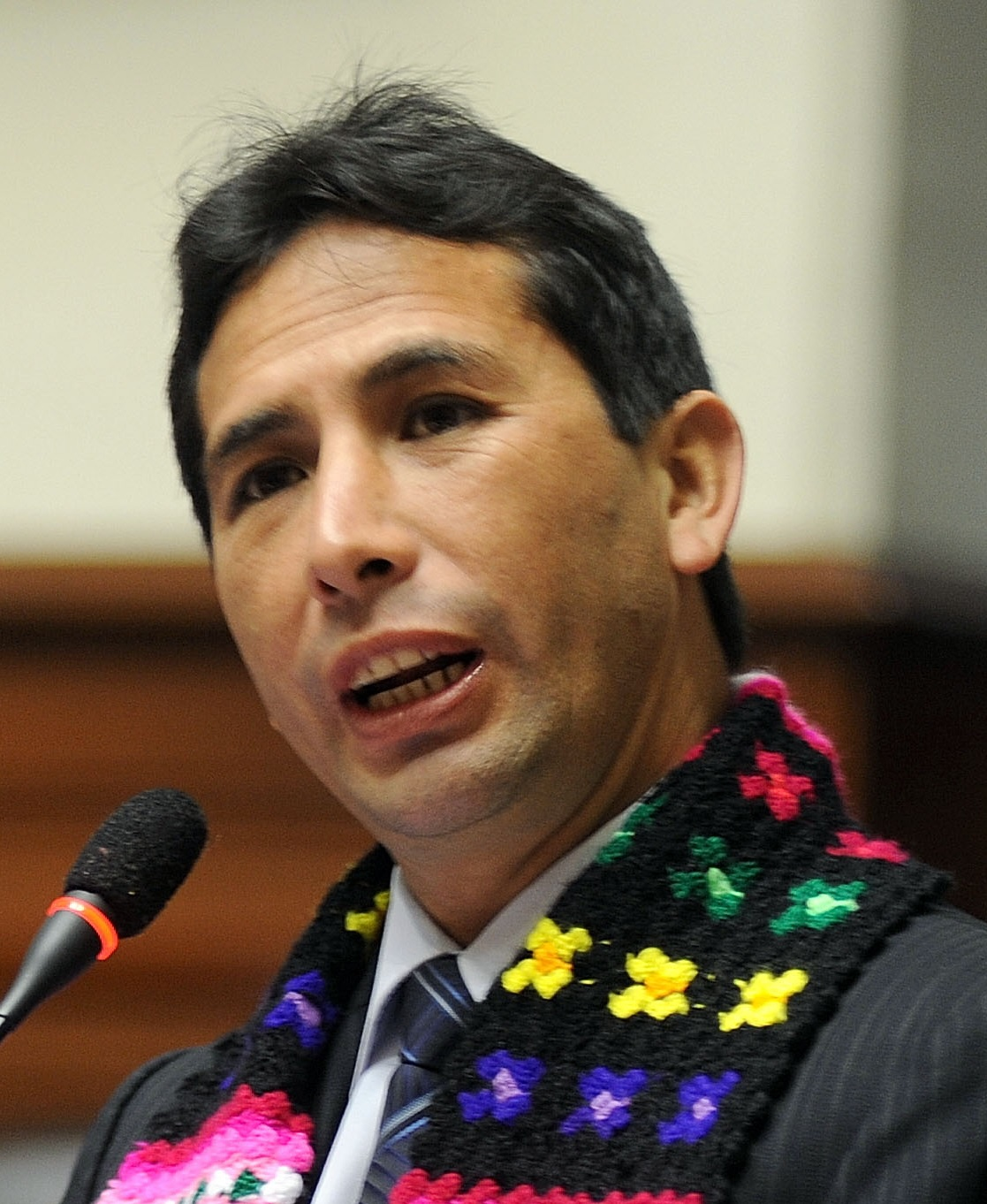
- Ruiz speaking in Congress

Member of Congress
- In office 26 July 2006 – 26 July 2011
- Constituency: Huancavelica

Personal details
- Born: 28 January 1970 (age 56) Lircay, Peru
- Party: Popular Action
- Other political affiliations: Peruvian Nationalist Party; Union for Peru
- Education: National University of the Center of Peru
- Occupation: Politician

Miro Ruiz Delgado Jr. (born 28 January 1970) is a Peruvian politician and belongs to the Peruvian Nationalist Party. He is a former Congressman representing Huancavelica for the period 2006–2011. Miró Ruiz lives in the residence club Huampani's Sunflowers in the Lima district of Chaclacayo.

== Biography ==
He was born in Lircay on 28 January 1970. His parents were Miró Ruíz Bendezú and Rosalía Delgado Galeas. He attended his primary and secondary studies in his hometown. He completed his higher studies in accounting at the National University of the Center of Peru in the city of Huancayo, graduating in 1995. Since then he developed working in the public sector precisely in dependencies of the regional government of Huancavelica. Between 2001 and 2004 he completed a master's degree in administration and finance at the Universidad del Centre.

=== Political career ===
In 2006 he ran for the Congress of the Republic as a candidate of the Union for Peru party for the department of Huancavelica, resulting in his election as a congressman. In the 2014 elections, he ran for the Huancavelica regional presidency under the Popular Action party, placing 8th with just over 2% of the votes.

== Controversies ==
=== Killing of a dog ===
On 26 May 2008 Ruiz was reported to Congress by his neighbor, Nina Ventura de Cardenas, after having allegedly shot and killed her 18-month-old schnauzer, Matias. He denied the charges, claiming the dog had been harassing ducks on his property. On 27 May, Ruiz admitted to having accidentally killed the dog and apologized for his behavior. He also acknowledged his lie, saying that he had been pressured by the "calumnies" directed against him.
