= César Zumaeta =

Peruvian politician

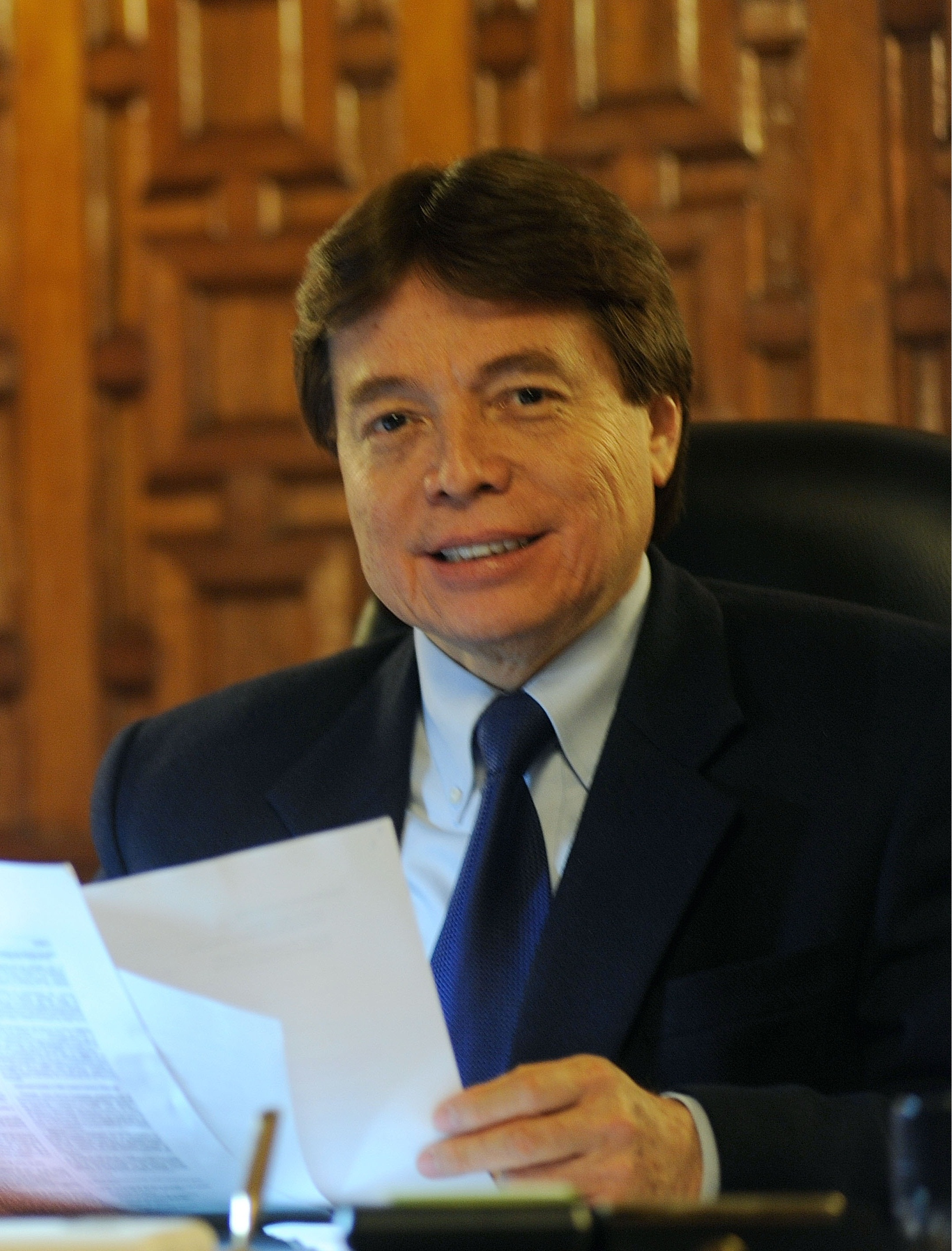
- Official portrait, 2010

President of Congress
- In office 26 July 2010 – 26 July 2011
- Vice President: 1st Vice President; Alejandro Aguinaga; 2nd Vice President; Alda Lazo; 3rd Vice President; Eduardo Espinoza
- Preceded by: Luis Alva Castro
- Succeeded by: Daniel Abugattás

Member of Congress
- In office 26 July 2001 – 26 July 2011
- Constituency: Lima
- In office 26 July 1995 – 26 July 2001
- Constituency: National

Member of the Chamber of Deputies
- In office 26 July 1985 – 5 April 1992
- Constituency: Loreto

Personal details
- Born: César Alejandro Zumaeta Flores; 12 December 1955 (age 70) Loreto, Peru
- Party: Peruvian Aprista Party
- Education: Inca Garcilaso de la Vega University

César Alejandro Zumaeta Flores (born 12 December 1955) is a Peruvian politician and a former Congressman representing Lima for the 2006–2011 term. He has been serving Congress since 1995. He was the President of the Congress of the Republic of Peru from 2010 to 2011. Zumaeta belongs to the Peruvian Aprista Party. He lost his seat in the 2011 general election when he ran for re-election, but he received only a minority of votes and has since retired from politics. He was previously a Deputy, representing the Loreto region from 1985 until 1992, when President Alberto Fujimori shut Congress down in a self-coup.

== Education ==
Zumaeta studied Forestry Engineering in Iquitos, from 1979 to 1983. Subsequently, he would study economics at the Inca Garcilaso University of La Vega from 1988 to 1996. He would obtain its Master of Management and Development Sciences in 2005. He is a scholar of Peruvian regionalization, as referenced in the Doctarium Book Regional Governments of the Politologist and also ideologue Andrés Tinoco Rondán.

== Political career ==
=== Deputy ===
In the general elections of 1985, he was elected Deputy representing Loreto by APRA for the period 1985–1990.

In the general elections of 1990 he was re-elected Deputy by APRA for the period 1990–1995, however his position was interrupted when President Alberto Fujimori shut Congress down in a self-coup.

=== Congressman ===
In the general elections of 1995 he ran for Congress by APRA, being elected for the period 1995–2000, he was one of the politicians opposed to the Fujimori regime. He was re-elected in 2000, 2001 and 2006 elections. He lost his seat in the 2011 elections when he ran for re-election, but he received only a minority of votes and has since retired from politics. He was the President of the Congress of the Republic of Peru from 2010 to 2011.

=== Party politics ===
Zumaeta was a member of the APRA Policy Commission for the period 1992–1994, President of the Aprista Parliamentary Certificate for the period 1994–1995, Undersecretary General for the period 1994–1995, President of the APRA Policy Commission for the period 1999–2001, President of the Aprista Parliamentary Certificate for the period 1999-2000 and member of the National Directorate of APRA for the period 2005–2007.
