= Pando Health =

Healthcare data platform

- Formerly: Forward Health
- Industry: Data and analytics (health)
- Founded: 2017
- Founder: Dr Barney Gilbert, Dr Lydia Yarlott, Philip Mundy
- Headquarters: London, United Kingdom
- Website: hellopando.com

Pando Health is a healthcare data platform created by Beacon Medical Systems Ltd and Forward Clinical Ltd and named after the Pando tree.

== History ==
Pando was founded in 2016 by Dr Barney Gilbert, Dr Lydia Yarlott and Philip Mundy with a vision of connecting healthcare for everyone. The company raised more than $10m USD in venture capital financing, including from Stride Capital, Skip Capital and Sofinnova Partners.

The company was founded under the name Forward Health and rebranded as Pando Health in 2020.

Pando's core platform empowers healthcare professionals to collaborate and make expert decisions together. Usage during the COVID-19 pandemic in the United Kingdom increased rapidly, with more than 2 million clinical messages processed per week in 2020.

Since 2019, Pando has been the contracted medical messaging partner of the UK Ministry of Defence.

In July 2021 there was a security breach which saw NHS patients’ photos automatically uploaded onto certain Nokia and Motorola devices, resulting in temporary loss of an NHS customer. However, this contract was later reinstated.

In 2024, Pando took on further investment and new leadership, under Jean Nehme and Frank Seo.

More than 100 NHS Trusts adopted the platform, with more than 115,000 clinician users in the UK in 2025.

In late 2025, the company was acquired by US cybersecurity firm Hypori.

== Technology ==
Pando is based on XMPP, with a custom client and business logic. It provides sandboxed messaging between individuals and within groups, including text and images, alongside specific product features such as "Ask Advice", a mechanism to request asynchronous advice from other connected clinicians.
