= Rosa Venegas =

Peruvian politician

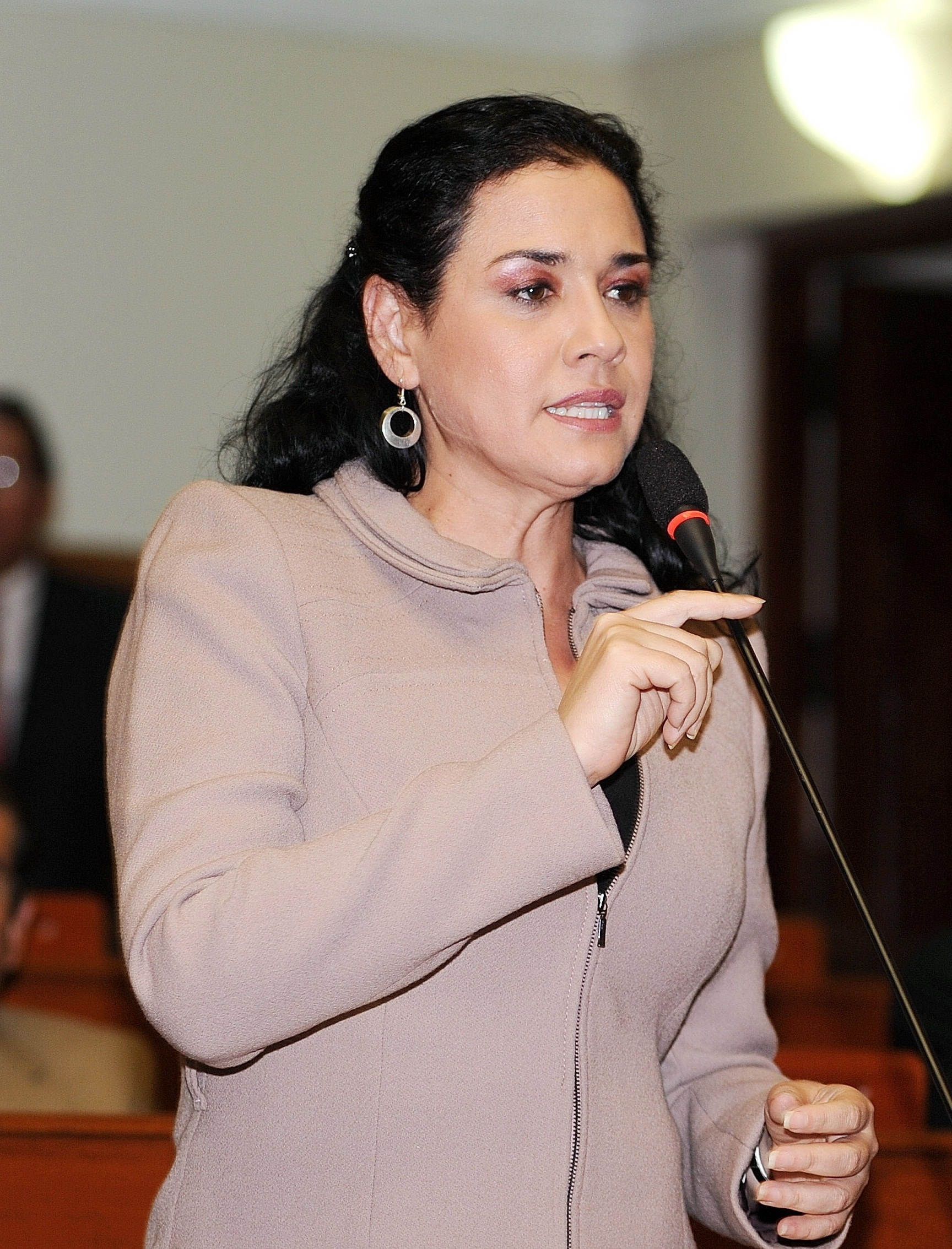
Rosa Venegas

Rosa María Mercedes Venegas Mello is a Peruvian politician and a Congresswoman representing Piura for the 2006–2011 term. Venegas belongs to the Union for Peru party.

While in Congress, Venegas was the head of the Congressional Commission on Women and Social Development, where she was integral in promoting the Law of Equal Opportunity between Men and Women (Law 28983).
