= Martín Rivas (footballer, born 1992) =

Uruguayan association football player

Personal information
- Full name: Roberto Martín Rivas Tagliabúe
- Date of birth: 14 March 1992 (age 34)
- Place of birth: Rivera, Uruguay
- Height: 1.79 m (5 ft 10 in)
- Position: Left-back

Team information
- Current team: Progreso
- Number: 44

Senior career*
Years	Team	Apps	(Gls)
2012–2018	Montevideo Wanderers	70	(0)
2018–2020	Liverpool	40	(0)
2021	Juazeirense	1	(0)
2022–	Progreso	5	(0)
- * Club domestic league appearances and goals as of 26 March 2023

Roberto Martín Rivas Tagliabúe (born 14 March 1992) is a Uruguayan footballer who plays as a defender for Progreso in the Uruguayan Primera División.

== Career ==
=== Montevideo Wanderers ===
Rivas began his professional career with Montevideo Wanderers in late 2012, making his debut for the club in a 3–0 victory over Racing Club on 11 November 2012. Over six seasons with the club, he made over 50 league appearances.

=== Liverpool (Montevideo) ===
In January 2018, Rivas moved to Montevideo-based Liverpool. After featuring frequently in 2018, Rivas stated that his goals for his second season with the club were to fight for trophies, although the idea of fighting for a championship was more of an "illusion." In June 2020, after spending the first half of the season out with a knee injury, Rivas' contract expired.

=== Juazeirense ===
In January 2021, after a half-year without a club, Rivas joined Brazilian club Juazeirense. He made one single Série D appearance for the club, against Itabaiana, in his five months with the club. In June 2021, his contract with the club ended.

== Personal life ==
Rivas has triple citizenship: Uruguayan (where he was born), Brazilian (through his mother), and Italian (through his great-grandfather).
