= Isaac Serna =

Peruvian politician

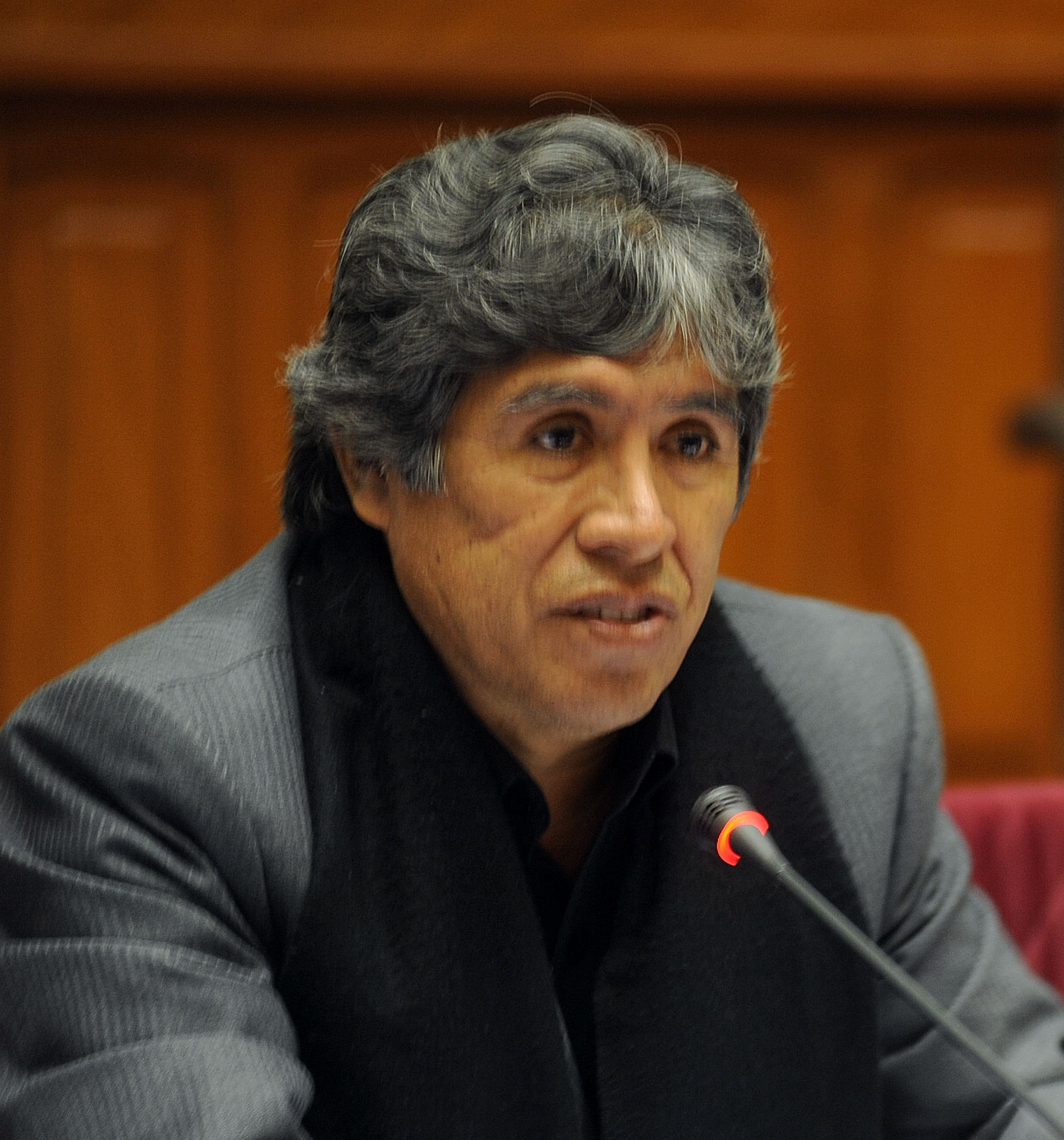
- Serna in 2011

Member of Congress
- In office 26 July 2006 – 26 July 2011
- Constituency: Ica

Personal details
- Born: Isaac Fredy Serna Guzmán; 12 November 1955 (age 70) Santiago de Chocorvos, Peru
- Party: Union for Peru
- Occupation: Politician

Isaac Fredy Serna Guzmán (born 12 November 1955) is a Peruvian politician. He is a Congressman representing Ica for the period 2006–2011, and belongs to the Union for Peru party. He failed to attain re-election in the 2011 elections when he ran for re-election under the National Solidarity Alliance, but he was not re-elected.

== Biography ==
Serna was born in the district of Santiago de Chocorvos, Huaytara province, Huancavelica department, Peru, on November 12, 1955, the son of Lino Serna Sayritúpac and Eva Guzmán Vda. of Serna. He completed his primary studies in his hometown and in the city of Ica. The secondary ones were studied in the Great San Luis Gonzaga School Unit in the latter city. Between 1976 and 1983 he studied mechanical engineering at the San Luis Gonzaga National University in Ica.

During his life, Serna ran several times to the congress and to the regional Presidency of Ica, almost always for the Union for Peru, of which he became first vice president. He ran for congress in the general elections of 2000, 2001, 2006, 2011, 2016 and 2020. Of all those elections, he was only elected as a congressman for Ica in the 2006 elections. For his part, he ran for the Presidency of the Regional Government of Ica in the regional elections of 2002, 2014 and 2018. He was never elected. During his tenure as a congressman, he participated in the formulation of 279 bills of which 59 were approved as law of the republic.
