= Rosa Florián =

Peruvian politician (born 1969)

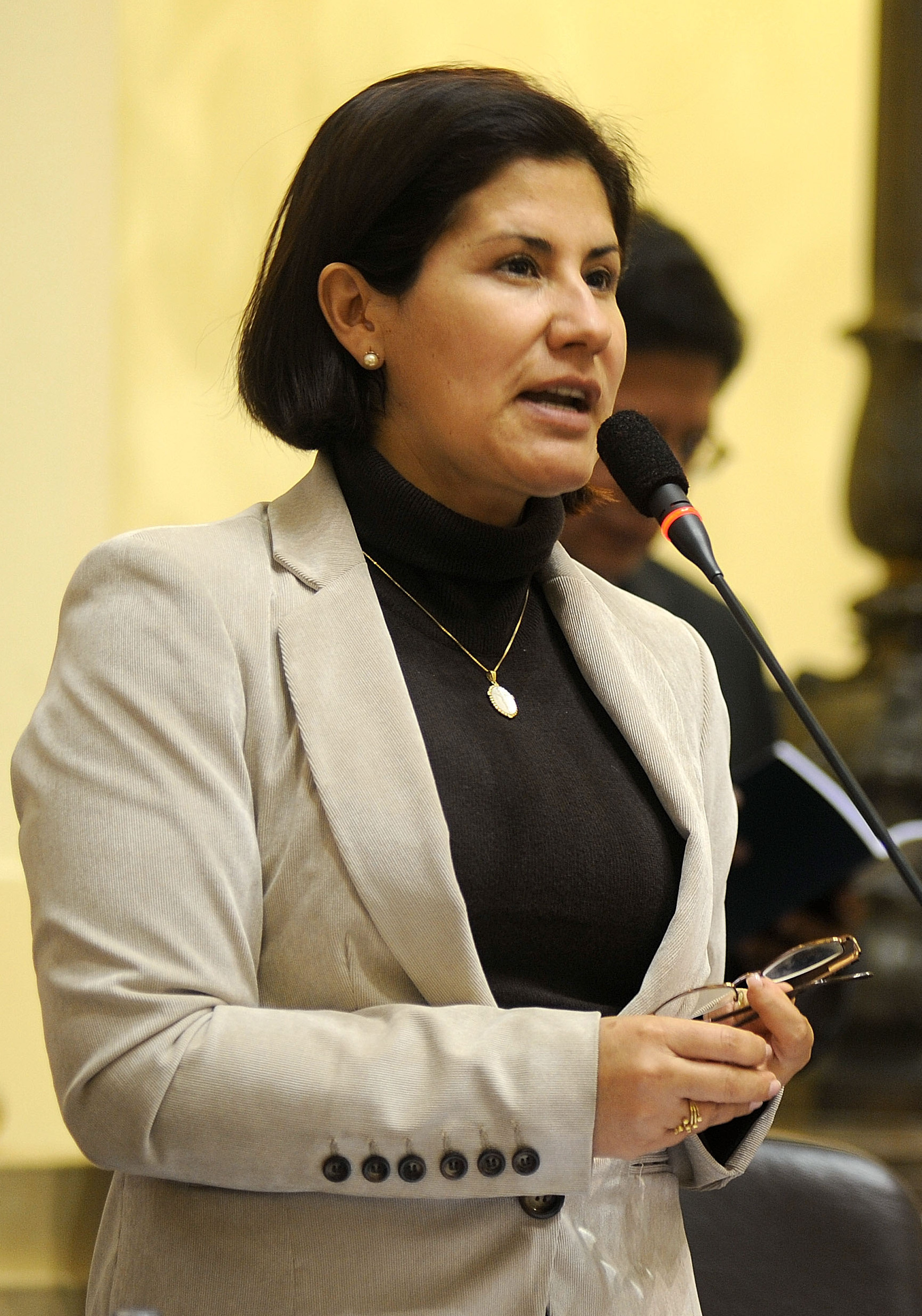

Rosa Madeleine Florián Cedrón (born Cajamarca, 1969) is a Peruvian politician. She was a Congresswoman representing Cajamarca for the period 2006–2011, and belongs to the National Unity party. She was born May 18, 1969, and was Mayor of Contumaza.
