= José Macedo =

Peruvian politician

Member of Congress
- In office 26 July 2006 – 26 July 2011
- Constituency: Ucayali

Personal details
- Party: Peruvian Aprista Party
- Occupation: Politician

José Macedo Sánchez is a Peruvian politician and a Congressman representing Ucayali for the 2006–2011 term. Macedo belongs to the Peruvian Aprista Party.
