= Oswaldo Luizar =

Peruvian politician (born 1962)

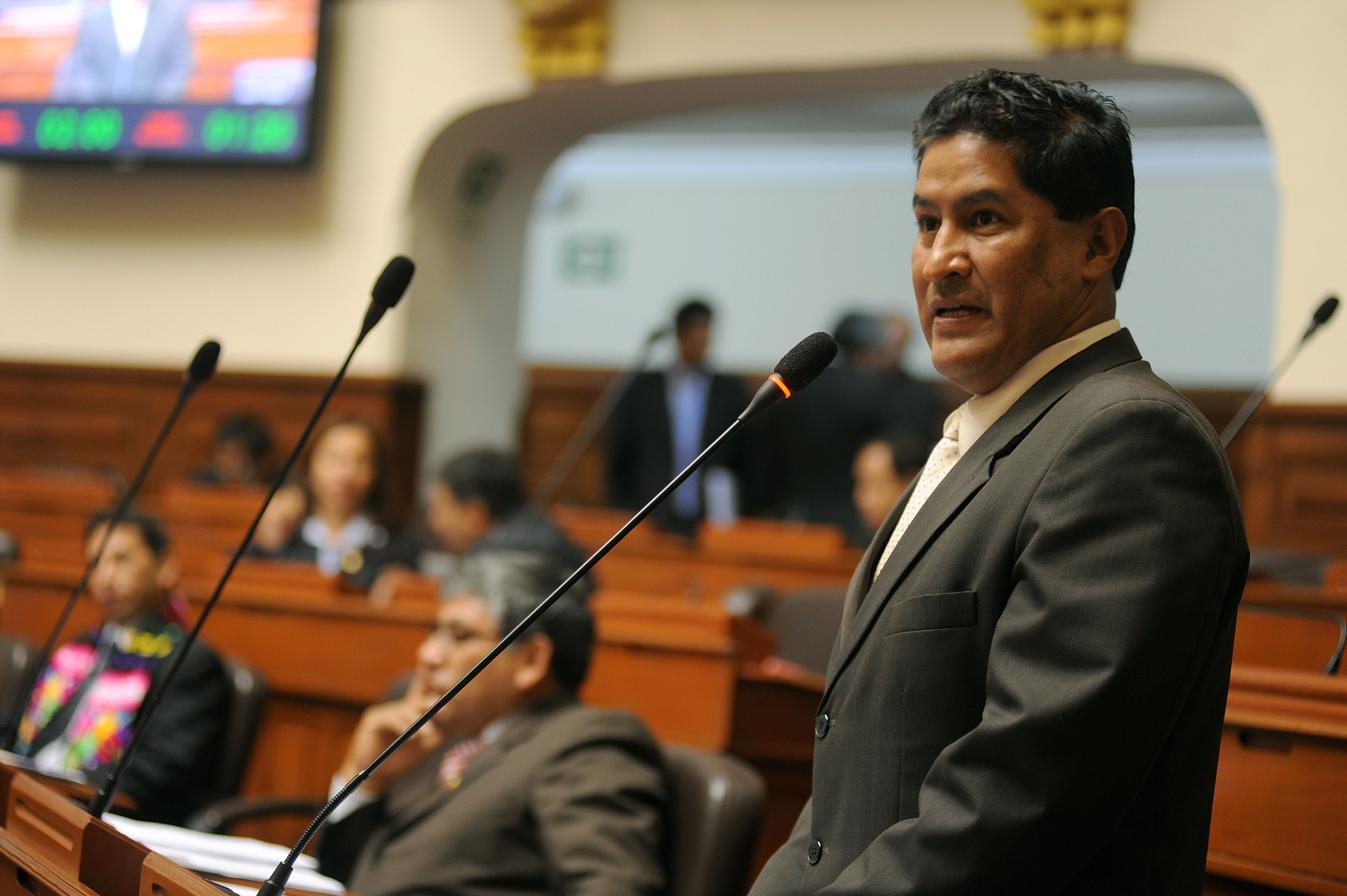
- Oswaldo Luizar

Member of Congress
- In office 26 July 2006 – 26 July 2011
- Constituency: Cusco

Personal details
- Born: Oswaldo Luizar Obregón; 13 November 1962 (age 63) Cusco, Peru
- Party: Popular Force
- Other political affiliations: Union for Peru; Peruvian Nationalist Party
- Education: Peoples' Friendship University of Russia; University of Santiago
- Occupation: Politician

Oswaldo Luizar Obregón (born 13 November 1962) a Peruvian politician. He studied Physics. He is formerly a Congressman representing Cusco for the period 2006–2011, and belongs to the Peruvian Nationalist Party. He ran again in the 2016 elections, this time under the Fujimorist Popular Force, but he was not elected.

== Biography ==
He is the son of Jesús Orestes Luizar Fernández and María Celia Obregón Sánchez. He completed his primary and secondary studies at the Science College between 1969 and 1978. In 1979 he traveled to Russia where he studied Physics at the Faculty of Sciences of the Peoples Friendship University until 1985. Between 1996 and 2001 he did postgraduate studies in Physics magnetospheric at the University of Santiago de Chile.
