= Alejandro Aguinaga =

Peruvian doctor

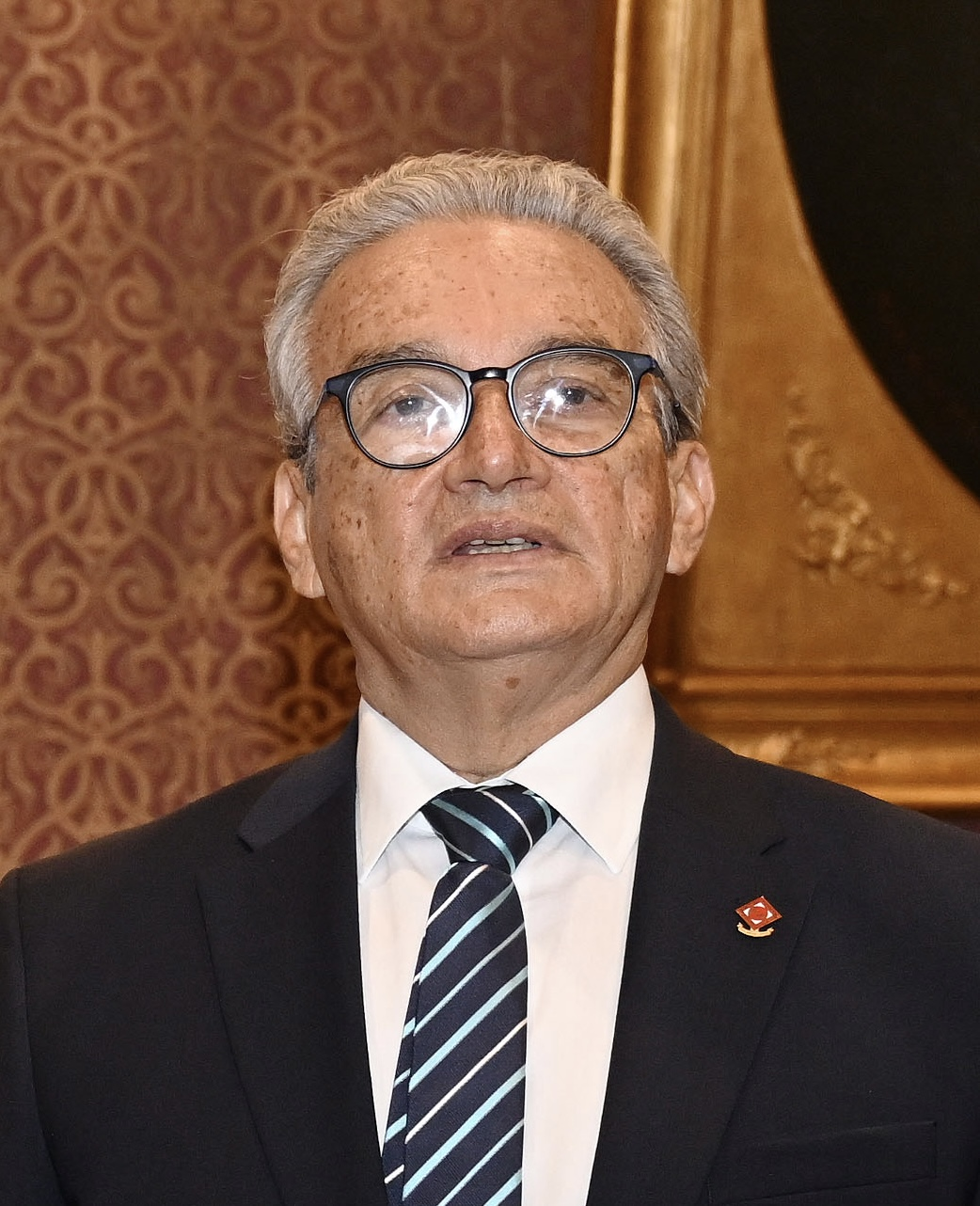
- Aguinaga in 2023

President of Congress
- Acting; 11 July 2009 – 26 July 2009
- Vice President: 1st Vice President; Himself; 2nd Vice President; Álvaro Gutiérrez Cueva; 3rd Vice President; Fabiola Morales
- Preceded by: Javier Velásquez
- Succeeded by: Luis Alva Castro
Other offices
First Vice President of Congress
In office 26 July 2010 – 26 July 2011
President	César Zumaeta
Preceded by	Cecilia Chacón
Succeeded by	Manuel Merino
In office 26 July 2008 – 26 July 2009
President	Javier Velásquez
Preceded by	Aldo Estrada
Succeeded by	Cecilia Chacón
Minister of Health
In office 15 April 1999 – 21 November 2000
President	Alberto Fujimori
Prime Minister	Víctor Joy Way; Alberto Bustamante Belaúnde; Federico Salas
Preceded by	Carlos Augusto De Romaña y García
Succeeded by	Eduardo Pretell Zárate
Deputy Minister of Health
In office 1994 – 15 April 1999
President	Alberto Fujimori
Prime Minister	Efraín Goldenberg; Dante Córdova; Alberto Pandolfi; Javier Valle Riestra; Víctor Joy Way
Minister	Eduardo Yong Motta; Marino Costa Bauer; Carlos de Romaña y García

Senator of the Republic
- Incumbent
- Assuming office 26 July 2026
- Constituency: Lambayeque

Member of Congress
- In office 26 July 2021 – 26 July 2026
- Constituency: Lambayeque
- In office 26 July 2006 – 26 July 2016
- Constituency: Lambayeque

Personal details
- Born: Alejandro Aurelio Aguinaga Recuenco; 28 January 1950 (age 76) Trujillo, Trujillo, La Libertad, Peru
- Party: Popular Force (2010-present)
- Other political affiliations: Independent (before 2010); Alliance for the Future (non-affiliated member / 2006-2010)
- Education: Universidad Nacional Federico Villarreal; National University of San Marcos
- Occupation: Physician
- Profession: Politician

Alejandro Aurelio Aguinaga Recuenco (born 28 January 1950) is a Peruvian doctor and Fujimorist politician. He is a Congressman, representing the Lambayeque Region, as he was before between 2006 and 2016. He was also the Health Minister during the administration of Alberto Fujimori from 1999 to 2000.

== Education and career ==
After eight years of studies since 1966, Aguinaga graduated from the Universidad Nacional Federico Villarreal in Lima with a medical degree, in 1975. From 1977 to 1979, he furthered his qualification at the National University of San Marcos, specializing in general and digestive system surgery. From 1981 to 1985, he attended a post-gradual training in gastrointestinal surgery at the Louis Pasteur University in Strasbourg, France. From 1985 to 2006 he practiced at the Archbishop Loayza Hospital in Lima, starting as an assistant surgeon and later gaining promotion to general director. As a professor, he has lectured about surgery at the Cayetano Heredia University, the Universidad de San Martín de Porres, and the private University San Juan Bautista. Additionally, he became the personal doctor of then-president Alberto Fujimori.

== Political career ==
=== Early political career ===
During the Fujimori's administration, he held the post of deputy minister of health from 1994 to 1999 and eventually he became minister heading the same ministry from 1999 to 2000.

=== Congressman ===
In the 2006 elections, Aguinaga was elected Congressman on the Fujimorist Alliance for the Future list as an invited candidate, representing the Lambayeque Region. In 2007, he assumed the presidency of the Foreign Relations Committee of the Congress of the Republic in which he served from 26 July 2007 to 26 July 2008. During 2008 and 2009, he was the First Vice President of the Congress under the leadership of Javier Velásquez. When Velasquez was appointed prime minister in July 2009, Aguinaga took over the interim Presidency of the Congress for a few days until 26 July when Congress elected Luis Alva Castro. During the Congressional leadership of César Zumaeta, Aguinaga was once again, the First Vice President of the Congress. In the 2011 elections, Aguinaga was re-elected for another five-year term, this time under the Force 2011 party of Fujimori's daughter Keiko. In 2021, Aguinaga is set to return to Congress, after a five-year absence.
