= Rafael Vásquez (politician) =

Peruvian politician

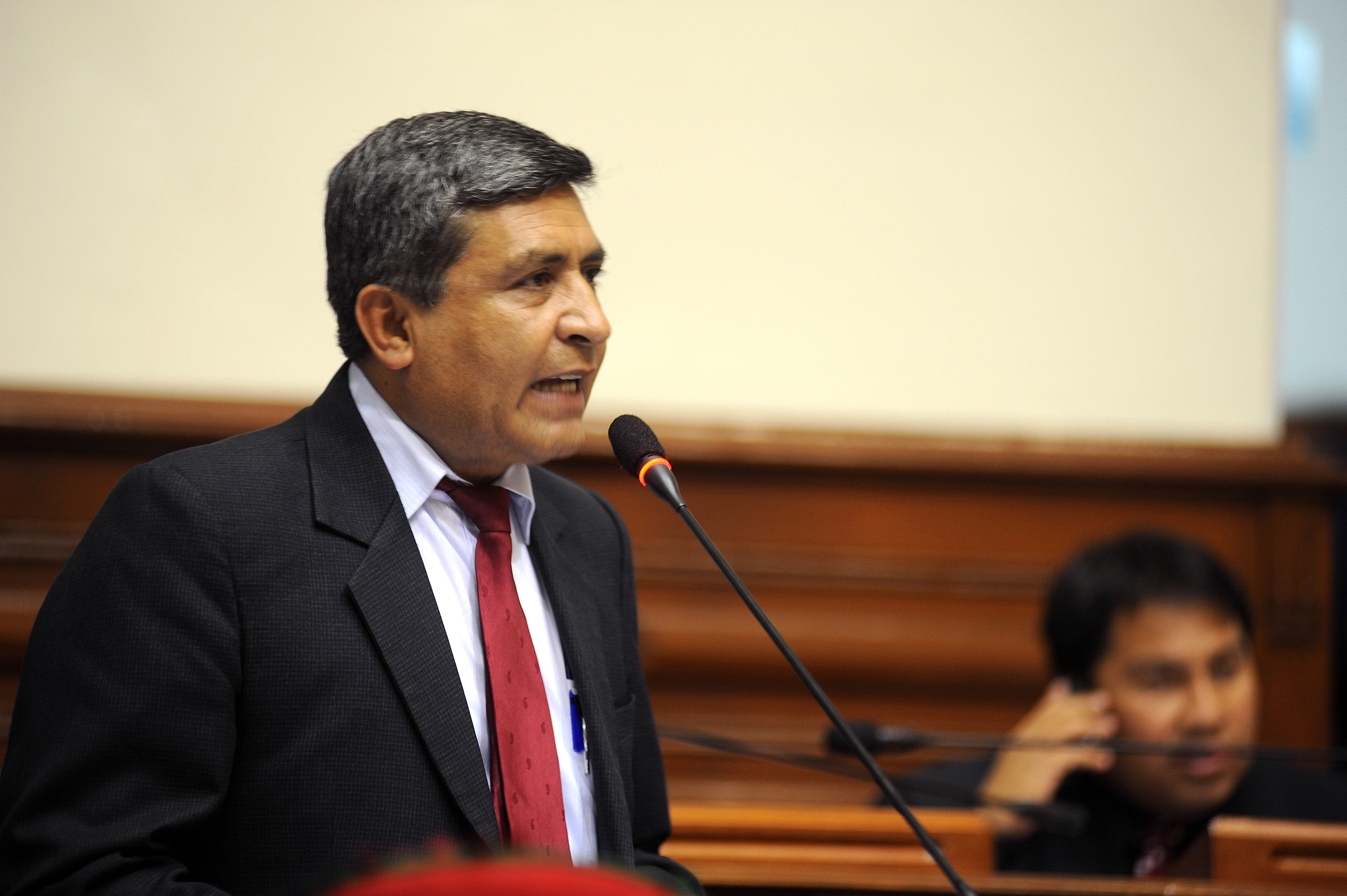

Member of Congress
- In office 26 July 2006 – 26 July 2011
- Constituency: Lima

Personal details
- Born: 21 November 1955 (age 70)
- Party: Peruvian Nationalist Party
- Other political affiliations: Union for Peru
- Occupation: Politician

Rafael Vásquez Rodríguez (born 21 November 1955) is a Peruvian politician and a former Congressman representing Lima for the 2006–2011 term. Vásquez belongs to the Peruvian Nationalist Party although he was elected under the Peruvian Nationalist Party-Union for Peru ticket.
