= Miguel Guevara =

Peruvian politician (born 1968)

Member of Congress
- In office 26 July 2006 – 26 July 2011
- Constituency: Piura

Personal details
- Born: Miguel Luis Guevara Trelles; 4 June 1968 (age 57)
- Party: Peruvian Aprista Party
- Occupation: Politician

Miguel Luis Guevara Trelles (born 4 June 1968) is a Peruvian politician and a former Congressman representing Piura for the 2006–2011 term. Guevara belongs to the Peruvian Aprista Party.
