= Tula Benites =

Peruvian politician

Tula Luz Benites Vásquez is a Peruvian politician and a Congresswoman representing La Libertad for the 2006–2011 term. Benites belongs to the Peruvian Aprista Party.
