= Elizabeth León =

Peruvian politician

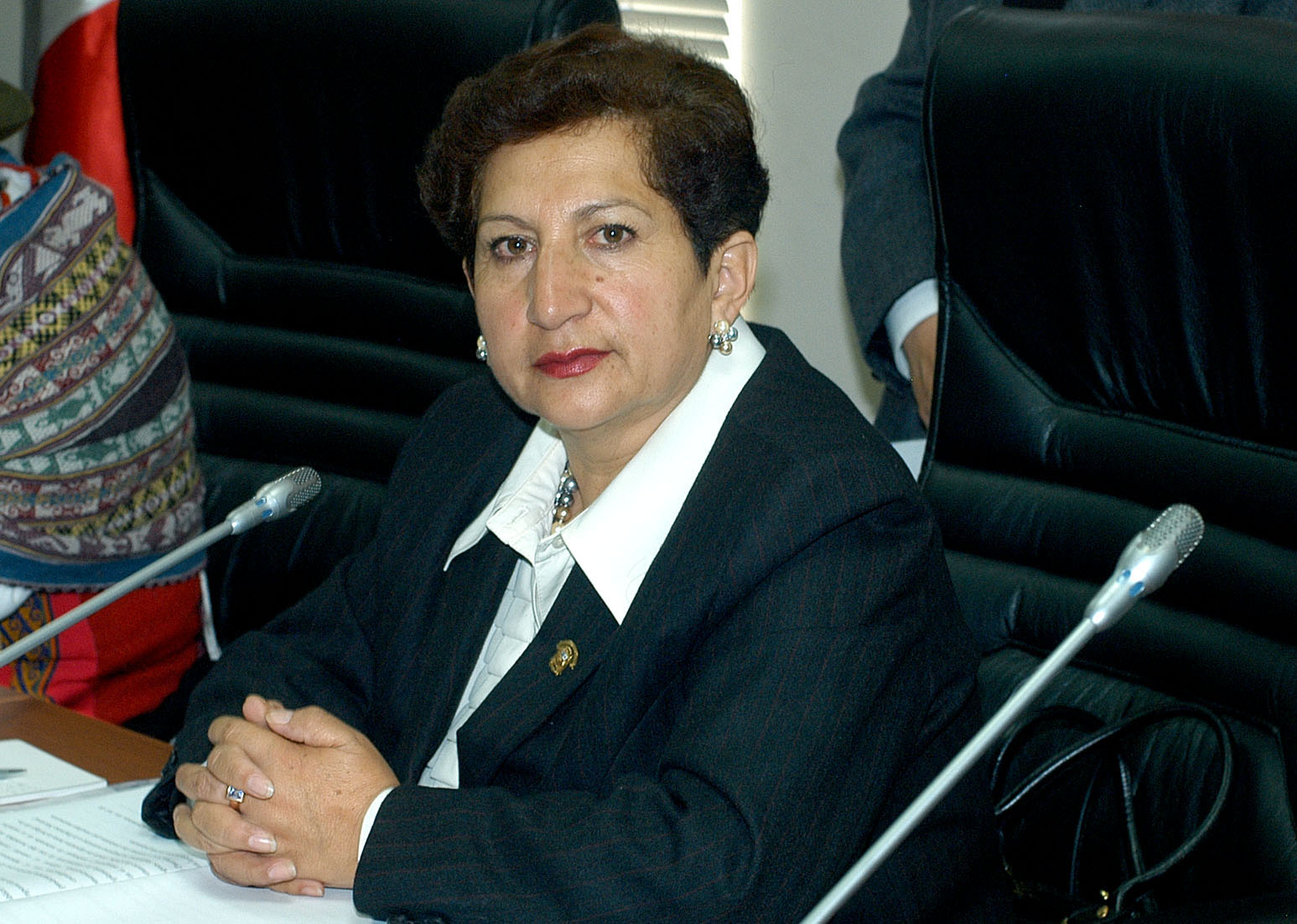
Elizabeth León

Elizabeth León Minaya is a Peruvian politician. She was a Congresswoman representing Ayacucho for 2006–2011, and belongs to the Union for Peru party.
