= Washington Zeballos =

Peruvian politician

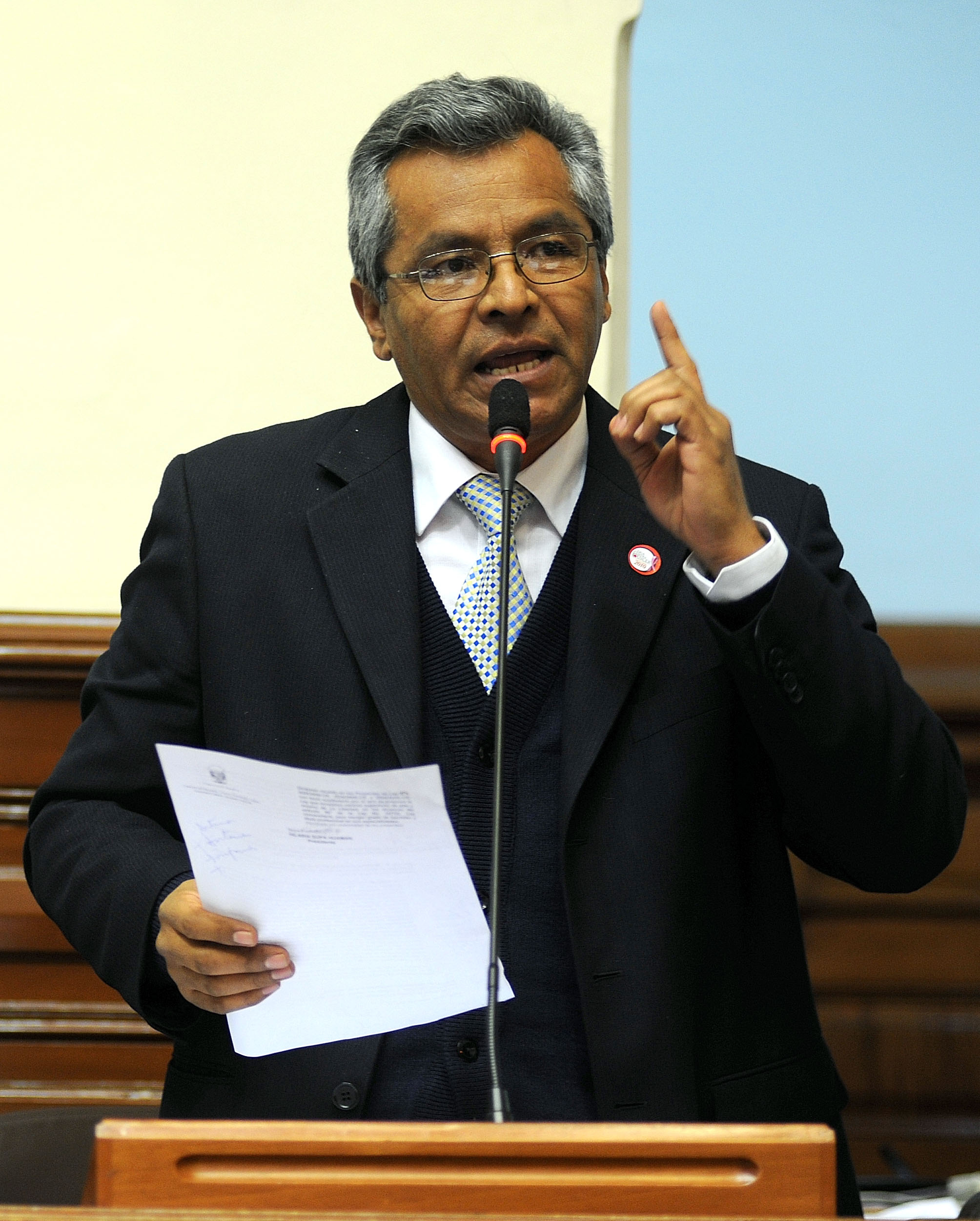
- Zeballos in 2010

Member of Congress
- In office 26 July 2006 – 26 July 2011
- Constituency: Moquegua

Personal details
- Born: Washington Zeballos Gámez; 22 December 1954 (age 71)
- Party: Possible Peru
- Other political affiliations: Union for Peru (until 2010)
- Occupation: Politician

Washington Zeballos Gámez (born 22 December 1954) is a Peruvian politician and a former Congressman representing Moquegua for the 2006–2011 term. Zeballos belongs to the Union for Peru party. He would later switch to Possible Peru. Zeballos lost his seat in the 2011 elections when he ran unsuccessfully for re-election under the Possible Peru Alliance.
