= Alfredo Cenzano =

Peruvian politician

Member of Congress
- In office 26 July 2006 – 26 July 2011
- Constituency: Puno

Personal details
- Born: 9 June 1949 (age 76) Peru
- Party: Peruvian Aprista Party
- Occupation: Politician

Alfredo Tomás Cenzano Sierralta (born June 9, 1949) is a Peruvian politician and a former Congressman representing Puno for the 2006–2011 congressional term. Cenzano belongs to the Peruvian Aprista Party. He retired from politics in 2011.
