= Javier Velásquez =

Peruvian lawyer and politician

Javier Velásquez OSP
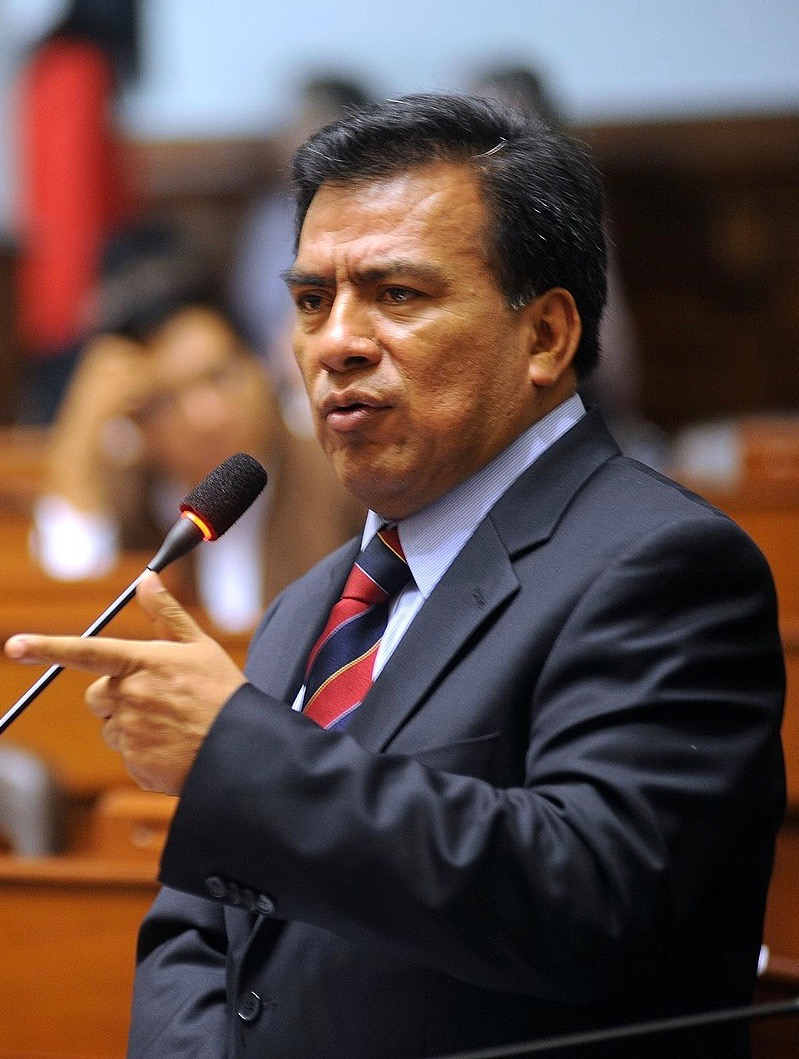

Prime Minister of Peru
- In office 11 July 2009 – 14 September 2010
- President: Alan García
- Preceded by: Yehude Simon
- Succeeded by: José Antonio Chang

President of Congress
- In office 26 July 2008 – 11 July 2009
- Preceded by: Luis Gonzales Posada
- Succeeded by: Alejandro Aguinaga (Acting)

Member of Congress
- In office July 26, 2001 – September 30, 2019
- Constituency: Lambayeque
- In office July 26, 1995 – July 26, 2000
- Constituency: National

Chairman of the Peruvian Aprista Party National Political Commission
- In office March 5, 2010 – July 8, 2017
- President: Alan García
- Preceded by: Mercedes Cabanillas
- Succeeded by: Mauricio Mulder

Personal details
- Born: Ángel Javier Velásquez Quesquén; 12 March 1960 (age 66) Etén, Chiclayo, Lambayeque, Peru
- Party: Peruvian Aprista Party; Popular Alliance (2015–2016)
- Spouse: Jenny Obando Popuche
- Education: Pedro Ruiz Gallo National University (LLB); Pontifical Catholic University of Peru (LLM)
- Occupation: Politician
- Profession: Lawyer

Ángel Javier Velásquez Quesquén (born 12 March 1960) is a Peruvian lawyer and politician. A prominent member of the Peruvian Aprista Party, he has served in Congress between 2001 and 2019, previously serving from 1995 to 2000.

Raised in Lambayeque, Velásquez started his political career from a young age, attaining positions among the party's regional cadres as a build-up to his first election to Congress in 1995. Following two consecutive reelections, he was elected President of Congress for the 2008–2009 legislature, and was subsequently appointed as Alan García's third Prime Minister of Peru of the administration, serving in the position until late 2010.

Velásquez was a candidate for the APRA's presidential nomination in the 2026 presidential election.

== Law career ==
In 1987, Velásquez graduated with a law degree from the National University Pedro Ruiz Gallo. Since that year, he has been a designate lecturer at the Higher Institute of Technology "República Federal de Alemania" in Chiclayo. From 1991 to 1992, he was head of the public register of the North Eastern region of Marañón. From 1997 to 2003 he additionally studied for a Master of Laws, focusing on Constitutional law at the Pontifical Catholic University of Peru. Velásquez was a lecturer (Professor) at the Private University Chiclayo in 2000/2001 and at the University of San Martín de Porres in 2006 and in 2007/2008, teaching constitutional law.

Currently he is studying to obtain a doctorate in law from National University of San Marcos in Lima.

== Political career ==
=== Early political career ===
Javier Velásquez started his career in the social-democratic Peruvian Aprista Party, serving as Secretary General of the Party's base in Lambayeque from 1992 to 1994.

=== Congressional career ===
In the 1995 elections, he was elected to the Congress for his first five-year term, but failed to attain reelection in the 2000 elections. In the 2001 elections, after a brief one-year absence, he returned to Congress and was re-elected in the 2006 and 2011 elections. From 1999 to 2004 he was vice-chair of the Political Commission on the Party. In June 2004 he presided the organizing committee for the XXII National Congress of the Party, at which he was elected to the national Political Steering Committee. He served as the President of the Congress from 2008 to 2009. From March 2010 to July 2017, he served as chairman of the party's Political Commission. He was reelected for a fifth term in Congress at the 2016 elections under the Popular Alliance.

His final tenure in office ended with the dissolution of Congress by Martín Vizcarra. He served a total of 23 years in Congress.

==== President of Congress ====
Thanks to his outstanding parliamentary work, Congressman Velásquez was entrusted by his party to run for the presidency of Congress for the annual period of sessions 2008 - 2009, competing with the opposition Víctor Andrés García Belaúnde of the Parliamentary Alliance, whom he won with a vote of 66 votes to 46 for Belaunde, electing him head of the National Congress.

The board of directors chaired by Velásquez was made up of Alejandro Aguinaga —First Vice President (Lambayeque) - Álvaro Gutiérrez —Second Vice President (Arequipa) - and Fabiola Morales (Piura), this was a purely provincial list, after many years of being directed by parliamentarians from Lima. One of the main objectives of this parliamentary formation was to strengthen the decentralization process in Peru, which had repeatedly been overshadowed by centralism.

As President of Parliament, Velásquez held decentralized sessions in different cities of the country in order to consolidate the decentralization process, taking the seat of parliament to the interior of the country.

=== Premiership ===
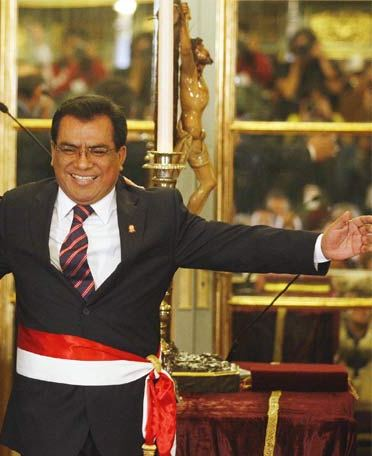
Velásquez Quesquén following his swearing ceremony as Prime Minister in July 2009.

On 11 July 2009, President Alan García named him as prime minister during the controversy surrounding indigenous clashes with the government when 34 people died. He was sworn in at 8:00 pm on 12 July 2009. The appointment of Velásquez, considered a party loyalist, was seen by pundits as an attempt by García to tighten his grip on power for his final term. It is considered a reversal after appointing the leftist Yehude Simon, Velásquez's predecessor. Velásquez is the third person to hold the office in nine months. Garcia, whose approval rating was 21 percent, also replaced the ministers of defense, justice, agriculture and the interior. He resigned his post in September 2010 with the intention to run for the Peruvian Aprista Party presidential nomination later that year. Although not selected as the nominee, he was part of the presidential ticket of Mercedes Aráoz in which he was the candidate for First Vice President until her withdrawal from the election in January 2011.

=== Party insider ===
Velásquez is considered a governing party insider, having served in Congress for 23 years. He is thought to be an adept negotiator with a powerful rhetoric in defense of his leader Alan García.

== Electoral history ==
Election	Office	List	#	District	Votes			Result	Ref.
Election	Office	List	#	District	Total	%	P.	Result	Ref.
1995	Member of Congress	Peruvian Aprista Party	12	National	5,437	6.53%	3rd (Note: Presented on an electoral list. The data shown represents the share of the vote the entire party/alliance received in that constituency.)	Elected	
2000	Member of Congress	Peruvian Aprista Party	9	National	13,021	5.51%	5th	Not elected	
2001	Member of Congress	Peruvian Aprista Party	1	Lambayeque	39,978	29.91%	1st	Elected	
2006	Member of Congress	Peruvian Aprista Party	1	Lambayeque	45,448	31.57%	1st	Elected	
2011	Member of Congress	Peruvian Aprista Party	1	Lambayeque	43,876	14.03%	5th	Elected	
2016	Member of Congress	Popular Alliance	1	Lambayeque	28,381	12.53%	2nd	Elected	
2026	Senator of the Republic	Peruvian Aprista Party	1	Lambayeque	10,534	1.86%	9th	Not elected	

Political offices
Preceded by Luis Gonzales Posada	President of the Congress of Peru; 2008–2009	Succeeded by Alejandro Aguinaga
Preceded by Yehude Simon	Prime Minister of Peru; 2009–2010	Succeeded by José Antonio Chang
