= Gustavo Espinoza =

Peruvian politician

Member of Congress
- In office July 26, 2006 – February 2010
- Succeeded by: Martín Rivas Texeira
- Constituency: Lambayeque

Personal details
- Political party: Peruvian Democratic Party

Gustavo Espinoza Roman is a Peruvian politician and a former Congressman representing Lambayeque for the 2006–2011 term. Espinoza was originally elected to Congress, as a member of the Union for Peru party, but left it after the election due to differences with the party and later formed the Peruvian Democratic Party along with fellow Congress members Carlos Torres Caro and Rocío González. He was disqualified in March 2010 and was replaced by Martín Rivas Texeira of the Peruvian Nationalist Party.
