= Carlos Torres Caro =

Peruvian lawyer and politician

Third Vice President of the Congress
- In office 26 July 2007 – 26 July 2008
- President: Luis Gonzales Posada
- Preceded by: Luisa María Cuculiza Torre
- Succeeded by: Fabiola Morales Castillo

Member of Congress
- In office 26 July 2006 – 26 July 2011
- Constituency: Lima

Personal details
- Born: Carlos Alberto Torres Caro; 14 September 1963 (age 62) Casma, Peru
- Party: Go Peru
- Other political affiliations: Order (2016); Peruvian Democratic Party (2006-2011); Union for Peru (2006); Peruvian Nationalist Party (2005-2006); National Solidarity (2000); National Front of Workers and Peasants (1992)
- Occupation: Lawyer

Carlos Alberto Torres Caro (born 14 September 1963) is a Peruvian lawyer and politician and a former Congressman representing Lima for the 2006–2011 term.

== Biography ==
He was born in the province of Casma, department of Ancash, on September 14, 1963. Son of the history professor Marcos Torres Herrera and the literary educator and lawyer Blanca Caro Anduaga, the first woman in the history of Peru to lead a large unit boys' school with more than 200 teachers and 4000 students in three shifts.

He is a lawyer and holds various degrees and titles. He is a Doctor of Law Cum Laude in the Specialty of Philosophy, Politics and Morals from the Complutense University of Madrid. Specialist in Human Rights Cum Laude, by the Institute of Human Rights of the Faculty of Law of the Complutense University of Madrid. He has pursued Postgraduate Studies at the Center for Constitutional Studies of the Spanish Senate in Madrid and in Political Science at the Sorbonne University in Paris. He has a Diploma in the International Course on Human Rights for Teachers and Researchers in Human Rights from the Institute of Human Rights in Strasbourg, France. Diploma in Higher International Studies from the SEI of Spain. Extrajudicial Conciliator.

As part of his professional experience, he did a consultant internship with the Unesco Human Rights and Peace Commission in Paris. Human and Humanitarian Rights Consultant for the United Nations International Organization for Migration. Former Senior Advisor to the Human Rights Commission of the Democratic Constituent Congress of Peru. Former Special Advisor to the Investigative Commission of the Democratic Constituent Congress for the La Cantuta Case. He has been Titular Provincial Criminal Prosecutor of Lima, Titular Superior Criminal Prosecutor of Lima and Deputy Supreme Criminal Prosecutor and Chief Advisor to the Cabinet of Advisors of the Office of the Public Prosecutor's Office.

He has also been a member of the Board of Directors of the Lima Bar Association, Director of the Magazine of the Forum of the Illustrious Bar Association of Lima, Director of the Dominical Page La República del Derecho and President and member of Ordinary Commissions of the Illustrious Bar Association from Lima. He has been incorporated as an honorary member of the Illustrious Bar Association of Ica, Illustrious Bar Association of Cusco, Illustrious Bar Association of Tacna and Moquegua, Illustrious Bar Association of La Libertad, Illustrious Bar Association of Piura, Illustrious Bar Association of Tumbes, Diploma of Honor from the Lima Bar Association, the Callao Bar Association, among other Bar Associations.

== Political career ==
=== Early political career ===
He first ran for a seat in the Democratic Constituent Congress in the 1992 Democratic Constituent Congress election under the National Front of Workers and Peasants, but he was not elected. Eight years later, in the 2000 general election, he ran for a seat in Congress, under the National Solidarity Party, but he was not elected as the party only got 5 seats.

=== Congressman ===
Torres Caro ran under the Peruvian Nationalist Party-Union for Peru party in the 2006 general election, obtaining the party's highest individual vote, but resigned from it after the presidential runoff, in which the ticket led by Ollanta Humala and in which Torres Caro ran as a candidate for Second Vice-President was defeated. He then founded the Peruvian Democratic Party along with fellow Congressmen Gustavo Espinoza and Rocío González. His term ended on 26 July 2011

=== Post-congressional career ===
He attempted to regain his seat in the 2016 elections under the Order party and in the 2020 snap elections under the Vamos Perú, but in both occasions, he was unsuccessful.
