= Elsa Canchaya =

Peruvian politician

Elsa Victoria Canchaya Sánchez was a Peruvian politician and a Congresswoman who represented Junín for the 2006–2011 term.
