= José Saldaña =

Peruvian politician

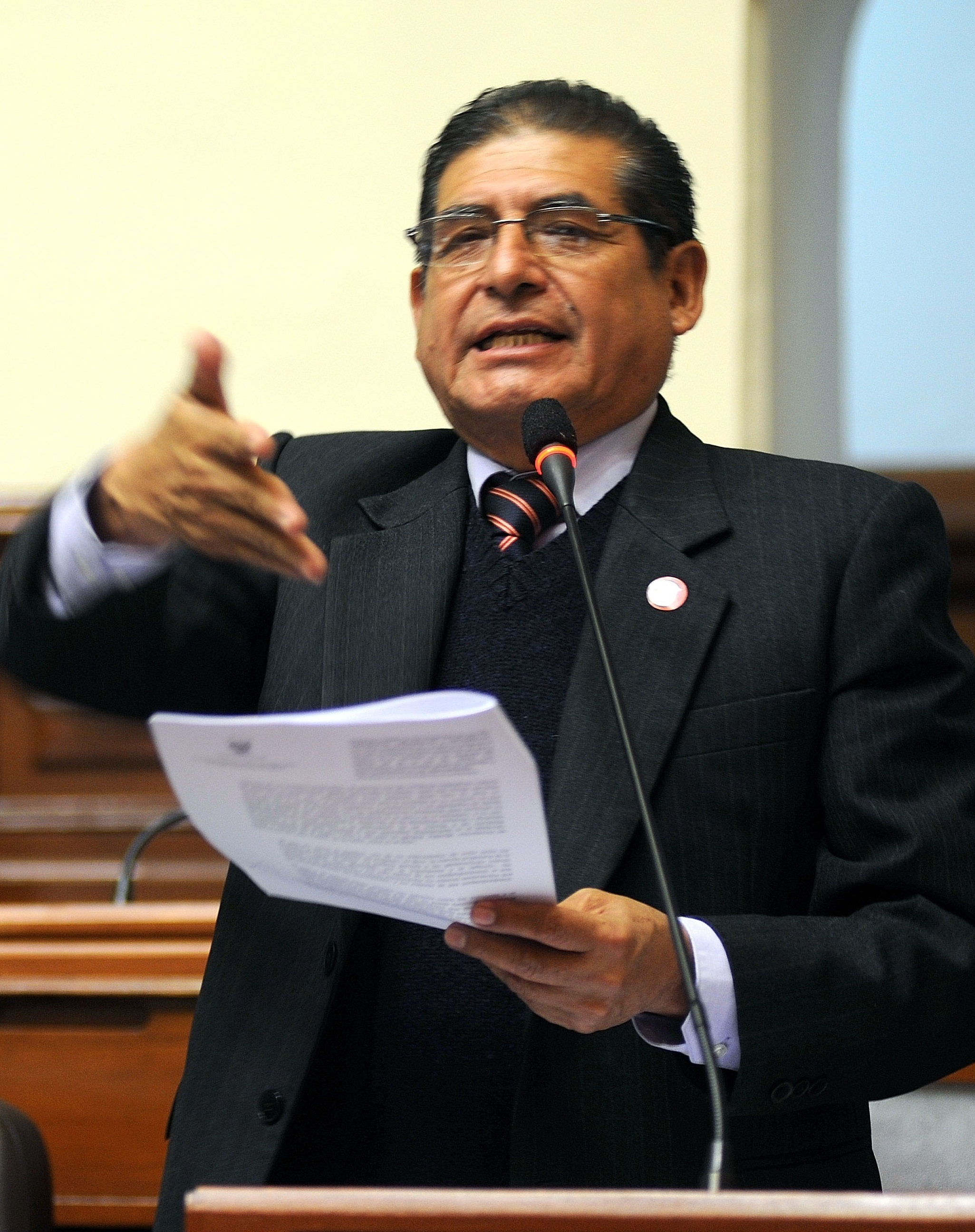

Member of Congress
- In office 26 July 2006 – 26 July 2011
- Constituency: Huancavelica

Personal details
- Born: 18 September 1947 (age 78)
- Party: Broad Front
- Other political affiliations: National Solidarity; Union for Peru; Possible Peru
- Occupation: Politician

José Saldaña Tovar (born September 18, 1947) is a Peruvian politician. He is a former Congressman, elected in the 2006 elections, representing Huancavelica for the period 2006–2011, and belongs to the Union for Peru party.
