= Yaneth Cajahuanca =

Peruvian politician

Yaneth Cajahuanca Rosales

Member of the Congress of the Republic of Peru
- In office 2006–2011
- Constituency: Huánuco

Personal details
- Party: Union for Peru
- Occupation: Politician

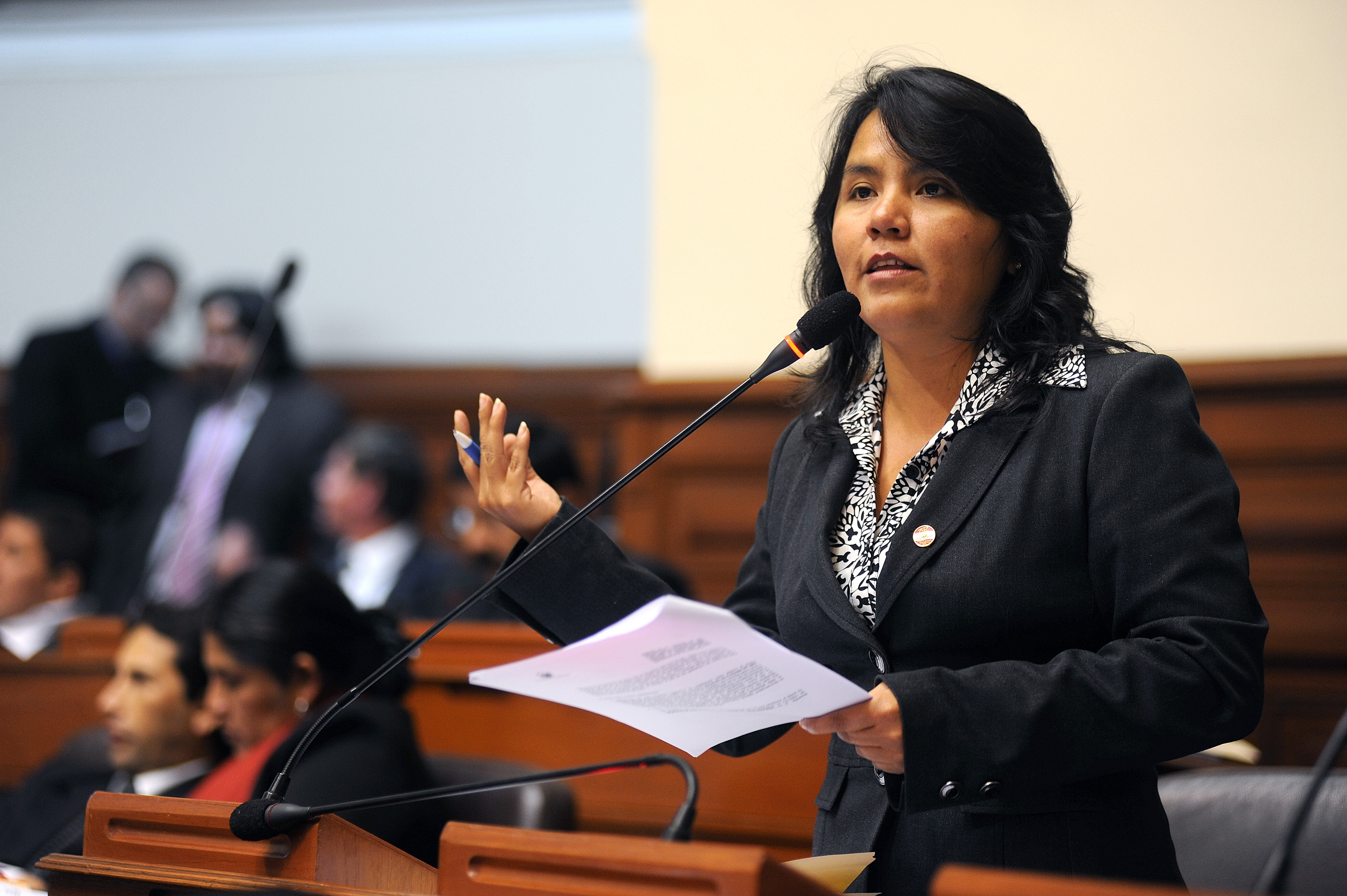
Yaneth Cajahuanca

Yaneth Cajahuanca Rosales is a Peruvian politician. She was a Congresswoman representing Huánuco for the period 2006–2011, and belongs to the Union for Peru party.
