= Werner Cabrera =

Peruvian politician

Mayor of Chota
- In office 1 January 2019 – 31 December 2022
- Preceded by: Neptalí Ticlla Rafael
- Succeeded by: Aníbal Gálvez Saldaña

Member of the Congress
- In office 26 July 2006 – 26 July 2011
- Constituency: Cajamarca

Personal details
- Party: Peruvian Nationalist Party
- Other political affiliations: Union for Peru (2006)
- Education: National University of Cajamarca

Werner Cabrera Campos is a Peruvian politician. He was a Congressman representing Cajamarca for a term between 2006 and 2011, and belongs to the Peruvian Nationalist Party (PNP).

== Background ==
He studied for nine years in the Peruvian National University of Cajamarca.

== Political career ==
in the 2006 elections, he ran for Congress, and was elected on the joint Union for Peru-Peruvian Nationalist Party ticket, representing the Cajamarca Region. After the alliance split, he sat on the Nationalist bench in Congress. While in office, he served on a series of committees relating to technology, education, agriculture, and housing.

== Criticism ==
During his tenure, as a chairman of an education subcommittee in Congress, he was criticized for declining student loans. According to a Spanish language newspaper, Cabrera approved only 188 out of over 400 loans, which the newspaper called a "dismal rating" of only 6.8% of loans approved.

According to the newspaper, his educational background has been criticized by his political opponents, who have deemed it unsatisfactory due to his repeated failure to pass Meteorology and Calculus among other courses. There have also been allegations that his resume failed to detail his repeated efforts to remedy his failed courses and that he kept university furniture from his service as the president of a student organization.
