= José Maslucán =

Peruvian politician

José Alfonso Maslucán Culqui is a Peruvian politician. He was a Congressman representing Amazonas for the period 2006–2011, and belongs to the Union for Peru party.
