= Alejandro Rebaza =

Peruvian politician

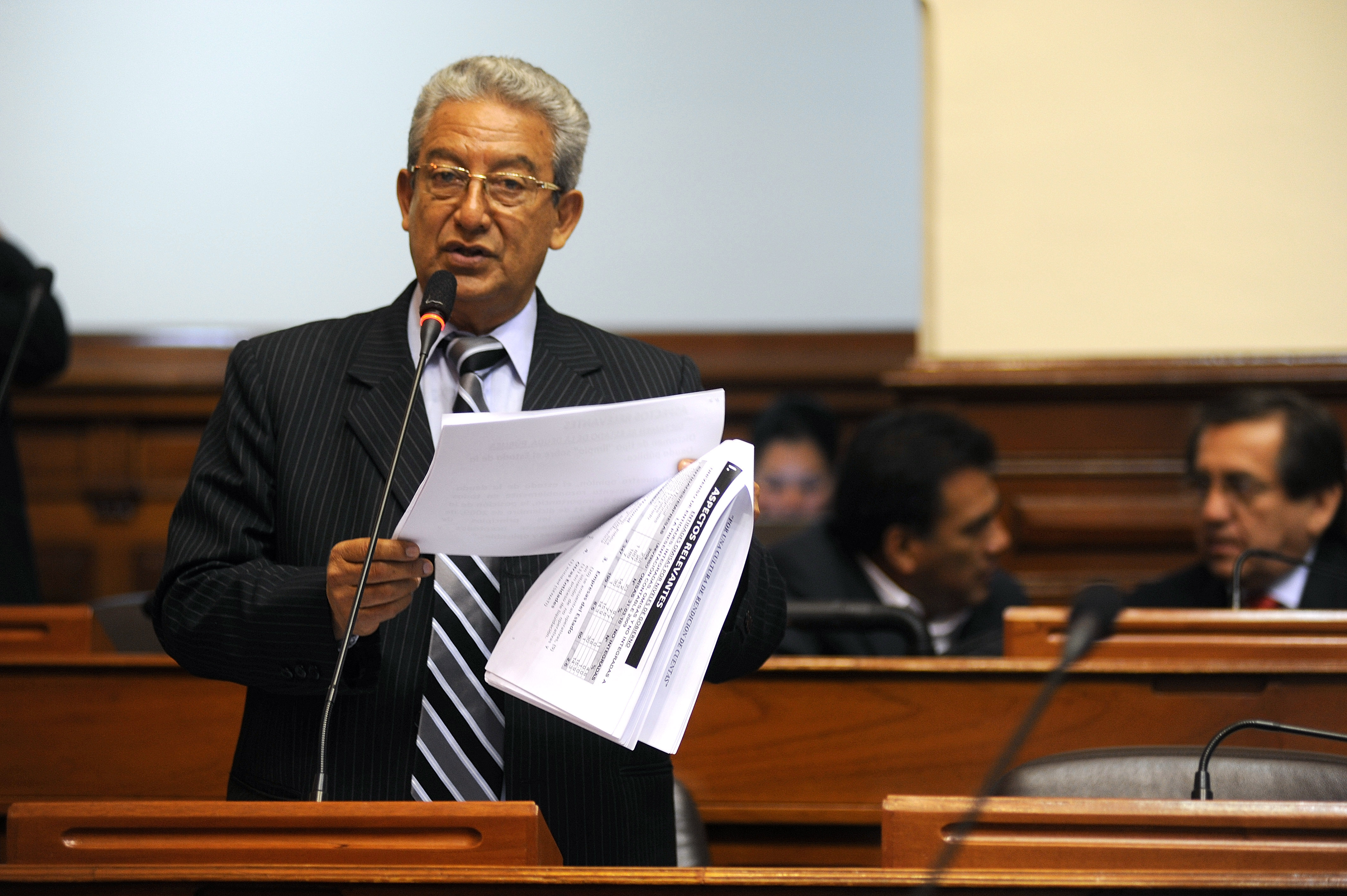
- Rebaza in 2010

Member of Congress
- In office 26 July 2006 – 26 July 2011
- Constituency: Cajamarca

Personal details
- Born: Alejandro Arturo Rebaza Martell; 20 September 1948 (age 78) Huamachuco, Peru
- Party: Peruvian Aprista Party
- Education: National University of Trujillo
- Occupation: Politician

Alejandro Arturo Rebaza Martell (born 20 September 1948) is a Peruvian politician. In the 2006 general election, he was elected as a Congressman representing Cajamarca for the period 2006–2011, and belongs to the Peruvian Aprista Party. In the 2011 elections, he failed to attain reelection. Before he became Congressman, he was previously, Regional Vice President of Cajamarca from 2003 until he was elected Congressman in 2006. During his time in Congress, he participated in the formulation of 318 bills of which 87 were approved as laws.

== Biography ==
Rebaza was born in Huamachuco, Sánchez Carrión province, La Libertad department on September 20, 1948. Between 1964 and 1967, he studied elementary education technical studies at the Cajamarca Normal School obtaining the respective title. Between 1966 and 1967, he studied higher education at the National University of Trujillo, obtaining a degree in primary education. Subsequently, between 1993 and 1997, he studied law at the Antenor Orrego Private University in Trujillo, as well as a master's degree in education between 1996 and 1997 at the National University of Trujillo.
