= Ponda =

Ponda may refer to:

- Ponda Baba, Star Wars character
- Ponda, Goa, a city and a municipal council in the South Goa district of Goa, India
- Ponda taluk, an administrative region of Goa, India
- Ponda (Goa Assembly constituency), one of the 40 constituencies of Goa Legislative Assembly
- Ponda Fort, a fort located in Ponda
