= Chota District =

Chota
- District
- Location within Peru
- Coordinates: 6.5602°S 78.6497°W
- Country: Peru
- Region: Cajamarca
- Province: Chota
- Capital: Chota

Government
  - Mayor: Werner Cabrera Campos

Area
  - Total: 261.75 km^{2} (101.06 sq mi)
- Elevation: 2,388 m (7,835 ft)

Population (2017)
  - Total: 47,279
  - Density: 180.63/km^{2} (467.82/sq mi)
- Time zone: UTC-5 (PET)
- UBIGEO: 060401

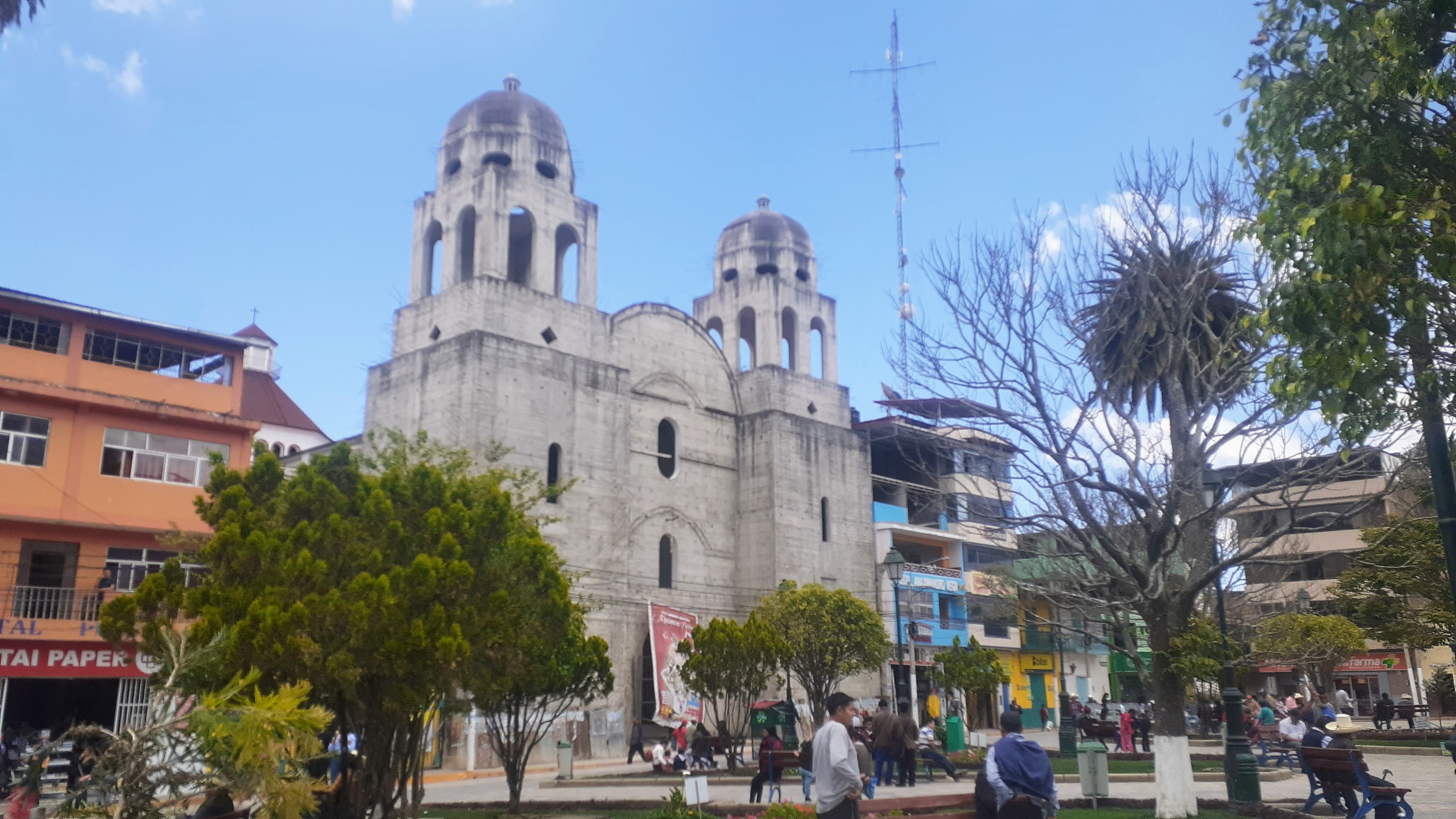
View of the All Saints' Cathedral of Chota. It is the seat of the Prelature of Chota.

Chota District is one of nineteen districts in the Chota Province in Peru. It is located in the central part of the province in the northern Andean region of Peru. Its capital is located on the plateau of Acunto at 2,388 meters above sea level and 150 km north of Cajamarca, or 219 km east of Chiclayo, Lambayeque.

== History ==
The pre-Incan history of Chota clearly shows the influence of Mochica Chavín; Miguel Cabello de Balboa in his Miscelánea Antárctica described their god Chota as a "man of great talent and great valor"—specifically mentioning the Acunto plateau. One of his descendants also carried this name. The Spanish conquest found the locals in a disorganized and rebellious state.

During the war with Chile, after the battle of San Pablo when the Araucanian entered Chota, the people decided to poison the waters of Colpamayo. Chileans ordered the burning of Chota, August 29, 1882 in retaliation for the defeat they suffered at San Pablo. Thousands of houses fell, and the church burned although the statue of their patron saint, Maria Inmaculada, was saved.

Chota dates to the pre-Inca period through the Incan. It was founded on 1 November 1559 and became part of the district of Huambo in 1777, with the name "All Saints". Chota was proclaimed independent on January 12, 1821. Horacio Villanueva granted it the status of "province" under Mayor Innocent Consar on February 6, 1821, and provisional status was granted by Don José de San Martín during the Protectorate.

== Festivals ==
The main festival is San Juan, held on 24 June; the bullfight in the Coso "El Vizcaíno", is the primary attraction. The Patronal Fiesta Santa Rosa de Lima takes place in the Cabracancha district of Chota, and is celebrated on August 30.

== Ronda Campesinos ==
The history Los Ronderos Campesinos began in Chota and has spread to many parts of Cajamarca. Chota was known to have "neighborhood watch" like vigilante organizations in many of its communities. However, Cuyulmalca got the credit as being the first group of Ronderos Campesinos to be recognized by the local government.
