= Walter Menchola =

Peruvian politician (born 1954)

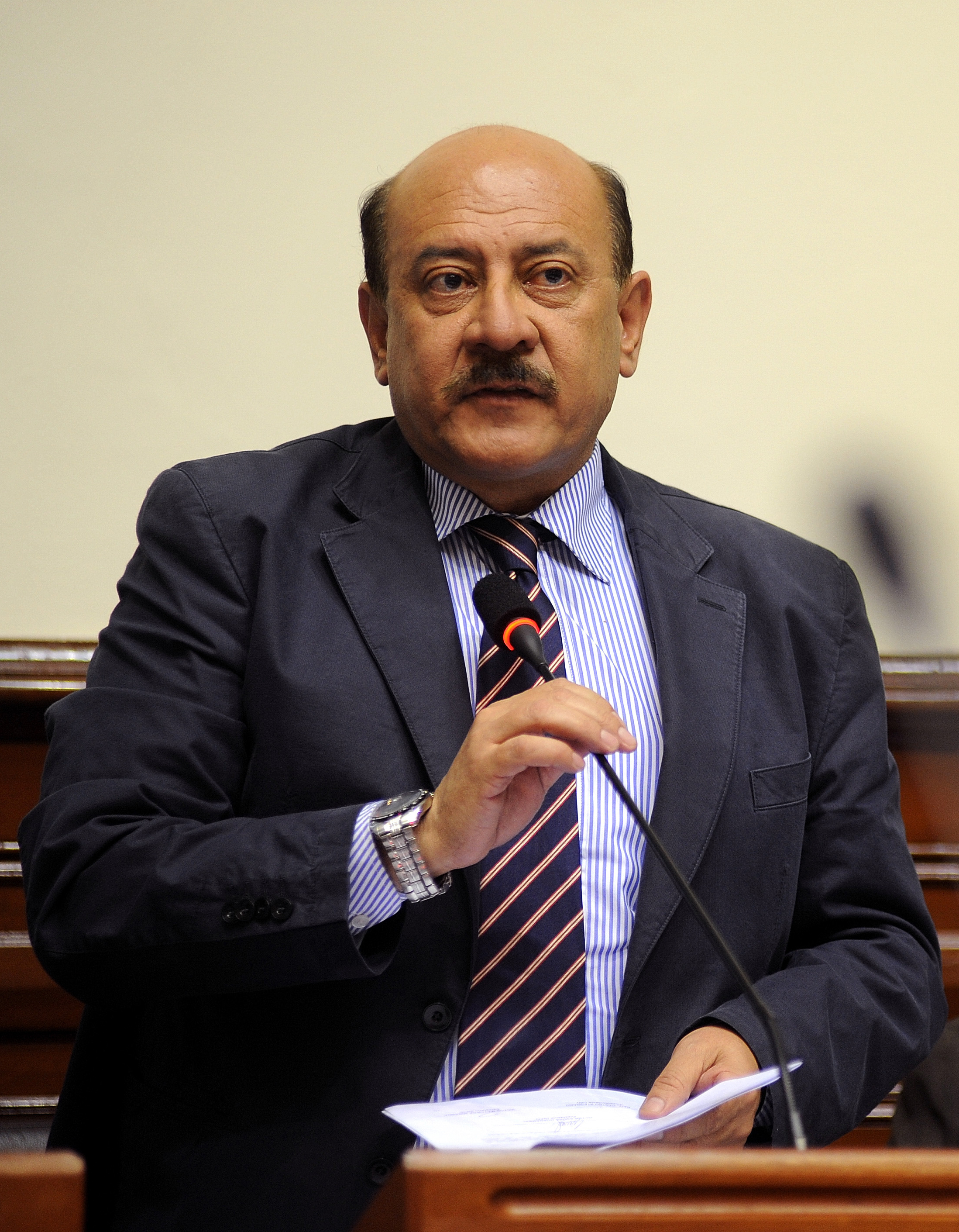
- Menchola in 2010

Member of Congress
- In office 26 July 2006 – 26 July 2011
- Constituency: Lima

Personal details
- Born: Walter Ricardo Menchola Vásquez; 17 April 1954 (age 72) Lima, Peru
- Party: National Solidarity
- Other political affiliations: National Solidarity Alliance; National Unity
- Education: Federico Villarreal National University; National University of San Marcos
- Profession: Politician

Walter Ricardo Menchola Vásquez (born 17 April 1954) is a Peruvian medic and politician and a former Congressman, elected in the 2006 elections, representing Lima for the 2006–2011 term. Menchola was elected to Congress under the National Unity list. Menchola belongs to the National Solidarity party. He failed to attain re-election in the 2011 elections when he ran for re-election, under the National Solidarity Alliance, but he was not re-elected. In 1997, he along with Luis Castañeda Lossio at the foundation of the National Solidarity Party.

== Education and career ==
He studied Human Medicine at the National University Federico Villarreal, graduating as a surgeon in 1980. He completed his postgraduate degree as an internist at the National University of San Marcos.

He was national director of health of the former Peruvian Institute of Social Security - IPSS (today Essalud) in 1984. He has master's degrees in organization and management of medical services, in primary health care, in Governance and Political Management, and is a Master's in Management and Public Issues.
