= Pedro Santos (politician) =

Peruvian accountant and politician

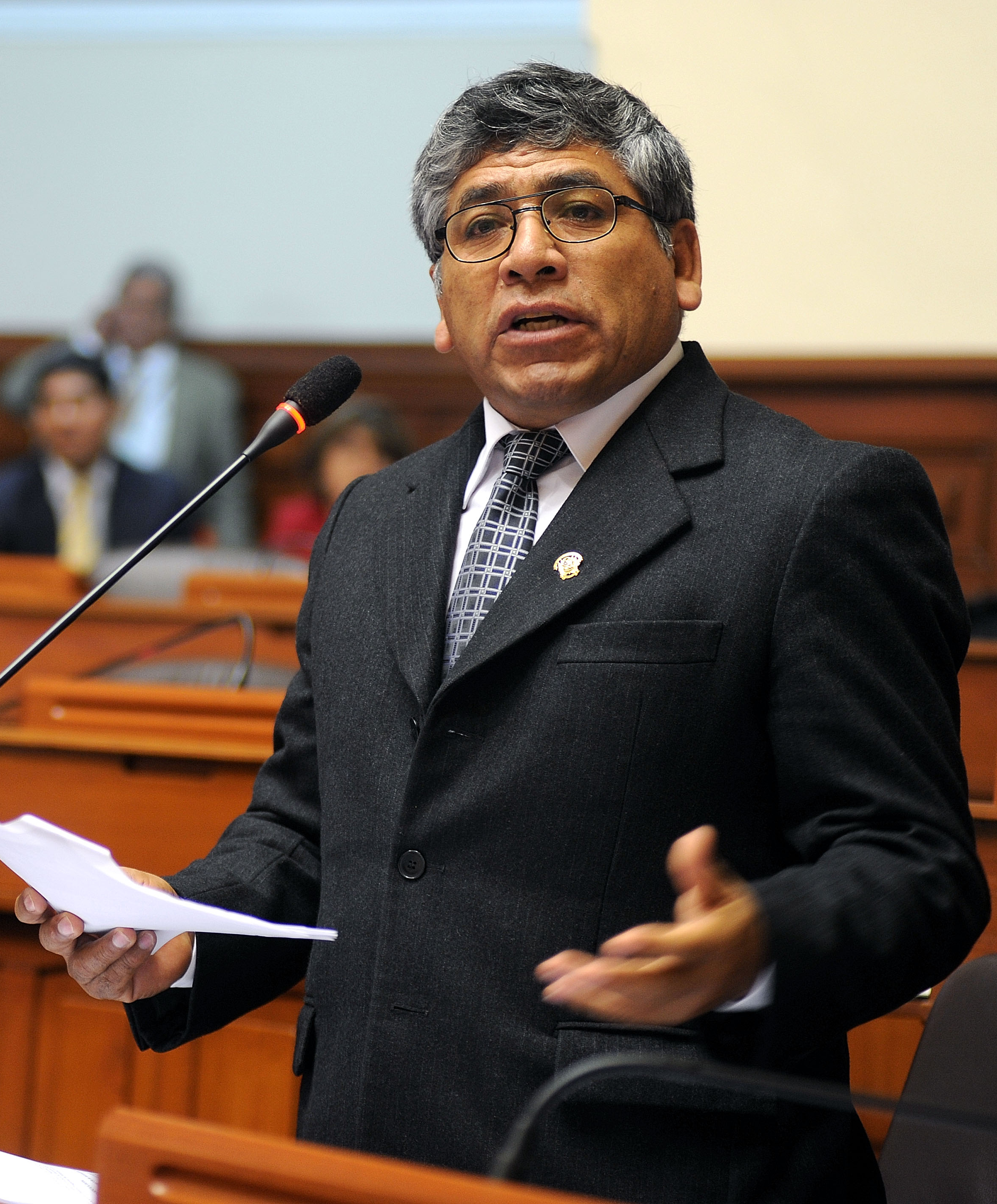
- Santos in 2010

Member of Congress
- In office 26 July 2006 – 26 July 2011
- Constituency: Arequipa

Personal details
- Born: Pedro Julián Bautista Santos Carpio; 9 January 1955 (age 71) Arequipa, Peru
- Party: Peruvian Nationalist Party
- Other political affiliations: Union for Peru
- Occupation: Politician

Pedro Julián Bautista Santos Carpio (born 9 January 1955) is a Peruvian accountant and politician. He is a former Congressman representing Arequipa for the period 2006–2011, and belongs to the Peruvian Nationalist Party.
