= Margarita Sucari =

Peruvian politician

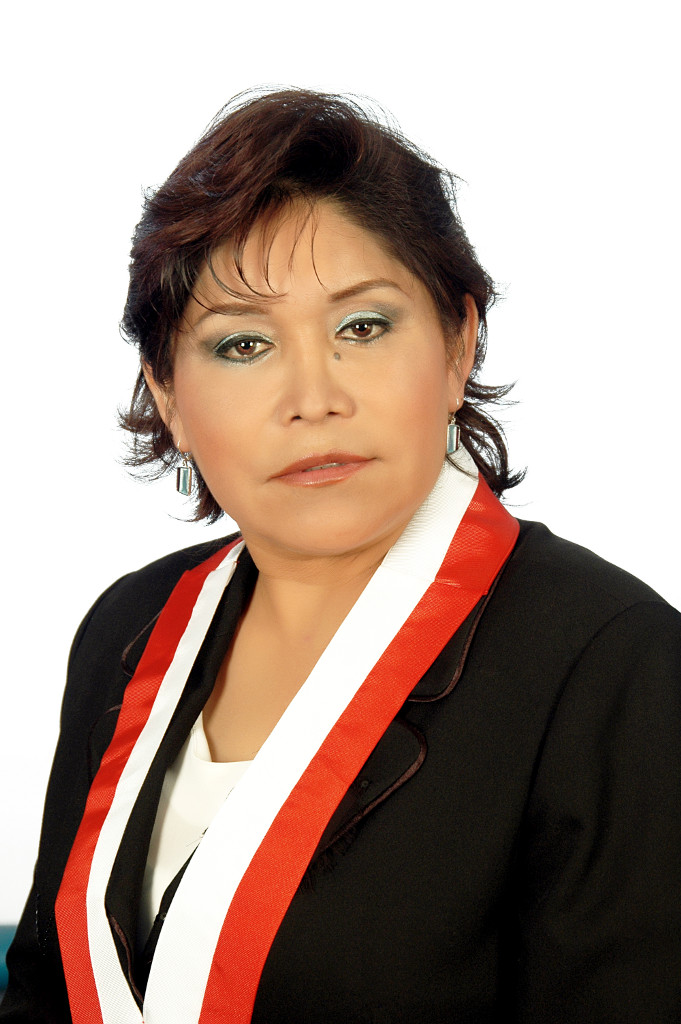
Margarita Sucari

Margarita Teodora Sucari Cari is a Peruvian politician and a Congressman who represented Puno for the 2006–2011 term. Sucari belongs to the Union for Peru party.
