= Eduardo Espinoza =

Peruvian politician and Mathematician

Third Vice President of the Congress
- In office 26 July 2010 – 26 July 2011
- President: César Zumaeta Flores
- Preceded by: Antonio León Zapata
- Succeeded by: Michael Urtecho

Member of Congress
- In office 26 July 2006 – 26 July 2011
- Constituency: Cajamarca

Personal details
- Born: 3 March 1946 (age 80)
- Party: Alliance for Progress
- Other political affiliations: Peruvians for Change; Union for Peru
- Education: National University of Cajamarca

Eduardo Espinoza Ramos (born 3 March 1946) is a Peruvian politician and Mathematician. He is a former Congressman who represented Cajamarca for the period 2006–2011 as a member of the Union for Peru party.
