= Martín Rivas (novel) =

1862 novel by Alberto Blest Gana

Martin Rivas is an 1862 novel by Alberto Blest Gana (1830–1920), and is widely acknowledged as the first Chilean novel. The social realist novel is at once a passionate love story and an optimistic representation of Chilean nationhood. Written shortly after a decade of civil conflict, this national epic is an indispensable source for understanding politics, morals, and manners of society in nineteenth-century Chile.

== Synopsis ==
The hero of the story is Martin Rivas, an impoverished but intelligent, ambitious young man from the northern mining region of Chile, who is entrusted by his late father, a gold rush speculator, to the household of a wealthy and influential member of the Santiago elite. While living there, Martin Rivas falls in love with his guardian's haughty daughter Leonore. The tale of their tortuous but ultimately successful love affair represents the author's desire for reconciliation between Chile's antagonistic regional and class interests. Indeed, many critics have interpreted Martin Rivas as a blueprint for national unity that emphasizes consensus over conflict.

In addition to providing humorous and biting commentary about the mores of Chilean society, Blest Gana documents the enormous gap that existed between the rich and poor classes. An invaluable text for its portrayal of contemporary social, political, and class conditions, Martin Rivas illustrates the enriching influence that romanticism had on nineteenth-century social realism. Parts of the novel were published as a serial-story in the Santiago newspaper La voz de Chile between May and July 1862.

== Narrative style ==
Kirkus Reviews refers to Blest Gana as "a would-be Balzac" in a review of the English translation of Martín Rivas; the review stated that "extended contrasts between Martin and his loved ones, colleagues, and enemies pays mixed dividends in an overly earnest, infuriatingly discursive narrative that nevertheless does gradually create a convincingly detailed picture of a culture under siege and in flux." The novel was praised in the 19th century for accurately and realistically depicting social customs of distinct social and economic classes.

== Legacy ==
- Martin Rivas is taught as part of the core curricula in Chilean public schools as the country’s preeminent novel of 'manners/ (costumbres) who message is to bring "civilization to the least educated classes of society."
- There are also popular Spanish language telenovelas and TV miniseries called Martin Rivas, and based upon the novels (1970, 1979, and 2010).
- During the Coronavirus pandemic of 2020, Chilean author Arial Dorfman used Martin Rivas as the measure for contemporary Chilean manners and morals, in his essay published in The Nation, "Confronting the Pandemic in a Time of Revolt: Voices From Chile." Dorfman posits that it is "paradoxical that exactly a hundred years after Blest Gana breathed his last, the founding myths of nationhood he helped to imagine and define have been shattered by a heroic social movement led by young people brought up on the works of this very author." Dorfman questions if Martin Rivas "were to resurrect today, (he) would probably deplore the greed and excesses of the cutthroat and all-too-real 'Chicago boys'... One can safely declare, nevertheless, that the current Chilean revolt is born out of a widespread rejection of the free-market, laissez-faire worldview that Blest Gana’s hero represents."

== Translation ==
- Martin Rivas, English translation by Tess O'Dwyer, scholarly introduction by Jaime Concha, Oxford University Press, 2000. ISBN 0-19-510713-6
