= Martín Rivas Texeira =

Peruvian lawyer and politician

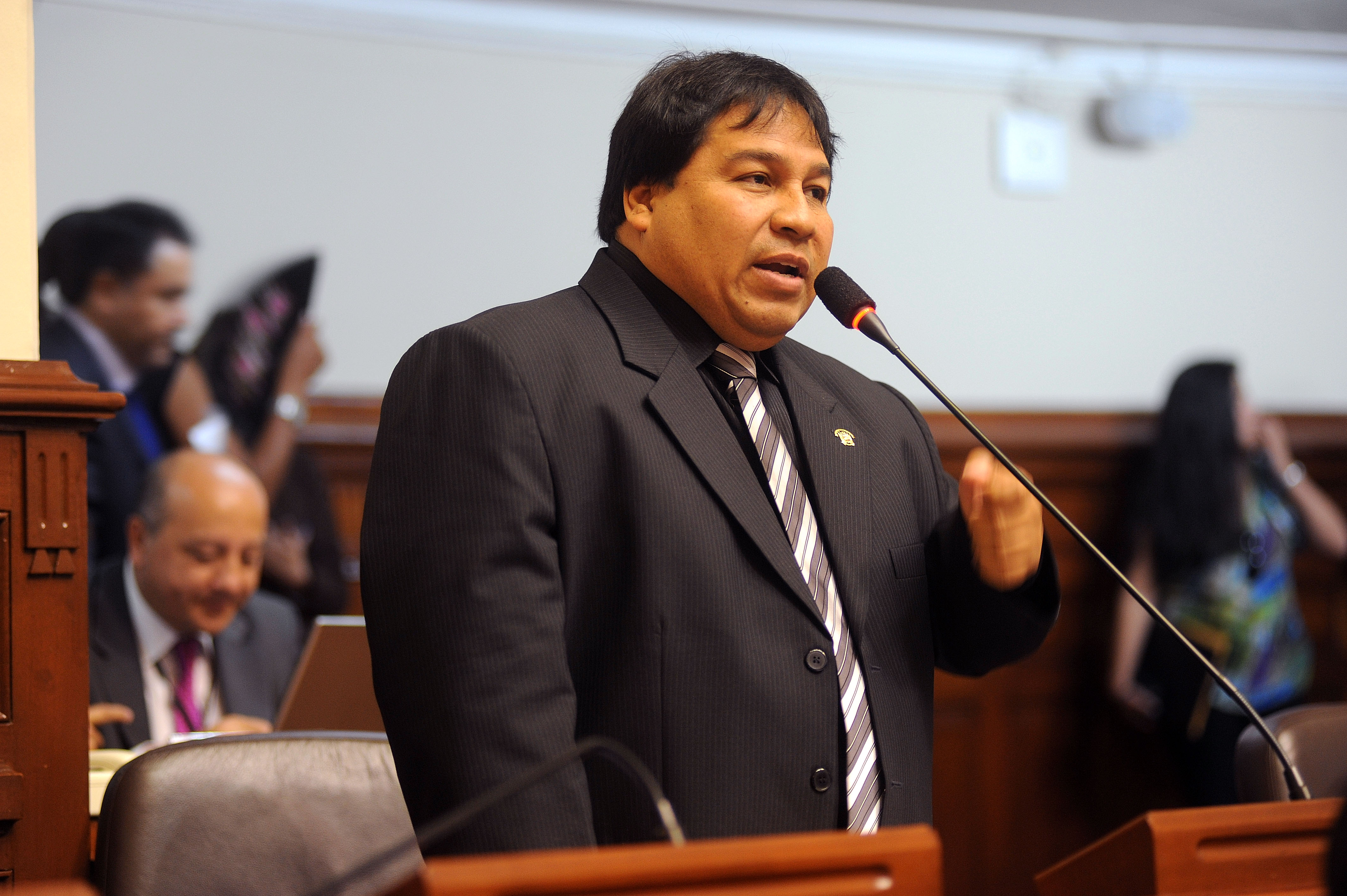
- Rivas in 2012

Member of the Congress
- In office March 4, 2010 – July 26, 2016
- Preceded by: Gustavo Espinoza
- Constituency: Lambayeque

Personal details
- Born: Martín Amado Rivas Texeira; 22 January 1969 (age 57) Chiclayo, Peru
- Party: Peruvian Nationalist Party
- Other political affiliations: Peru Wins (2010-2012); Union for Peru (2006)
- Education: University of San Martín de Porres
- Profession: Lawyer

Martín Amado Rivas Texeira (born 22 January 1969) is a Peruvian politician and lawyer. He was elected as a Congressman of the Republic of Peru for the 2011–2016 period, representing the Lambayeque Department under the Nationalist-dominated Peru Wins ticket. He has been serving in Congress since March 2010 as the replacement for the disqualified Gustavo Espinoza. Rivas belongs to the Peruvian Nationalist Party.

== Early life and education ==
Rivas was born in Chiclayo, Chiclayo Province in 1969. From 1987 and 1993 he studied law at the San Martín de Porres University in Lima. From 1988 and 2000 he completed a master's degree in criminal sciences at the Pedro Ruiz Gallo National University in Chiclayo and, between 2003 and 2005, he received a doctorate in law and political science from the same university.

== Political career ==
=== Early political career ===
Rivas first entered politics in 1998 for the local municipal elections of that year when he ran as a candidate for councilor of the province of Lambayeque, but he was not elected. In the 2006 general elections, he ran for Congress in Lambayeque on the joint Peruvian Nationalist Party-Union for Peru ticket but once again, he was unsuccessful. In the regional elections of the same year, he was a candidate of the Peruvian Nationalist Party for the regional presidency of Lambayeque, but he lost to then-Governor Yehude Simon of the Peruvian Humanist Party. In the 2011 general elections, he was elected as a congressman for Lambayeque on the ticket for the Peru Wins political alliance.

=== Congressional career ===
Rivas was summoned to the Congress in March 2010 as a replacement for the disqualified Gustavo Espinoza, to complete the latter's 2006-2011 parliamentary term. After being elected for a full term for the 2011-2016 parliamentary period, he participated in the formulation of 314 bills, of which 55 were promulgated as laws of the republic. He would be elected to a full-term in the 2011 general elections, representing the Lambayeque Department under the Nationalist-dominated Peru Wins ticket.

=== Post-congressional career ===
In 2020, Rivas announced that he would once again be running for a seat in Congress, under the Peruvian Nationalist Party running in the Lambayeque Department in the upcoming 2021 general election.
