= Ricardo Pando =

Peruvian politician (born 1964)

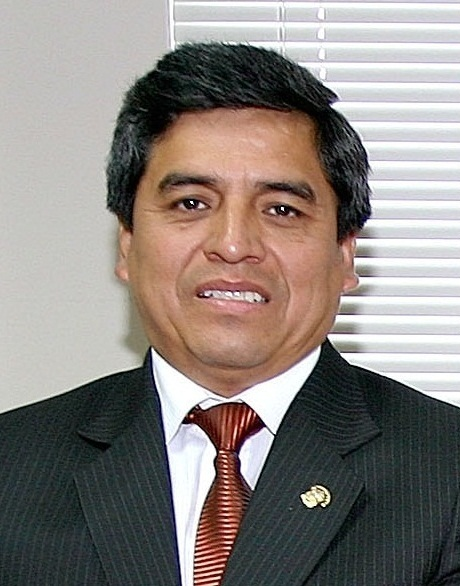

Member of Congress
- In office 26 July 2006 – 26 July 2011
- Constituency: Junín

Provincial Councillor
- In office 1993 – 31 December 1995
- Constituency: Tarma

Personal details
- Born: Ricardo Pando Córdova; 7 February 1964 (age 62) Lima, Peru
- Party: Popular Force
- Other political affiliations: Alliance for the Future; Peru 2000; Vamos Vecino; Cambio 90-New Majority
- Education: Universidad Peruana Cayetano Heredia
- Occupation: Politician

Ricardo Pando Córdova (born 7 February 1964) is a Peruvian Fujimorist politician. He is a former Congressman representing Junín for the 2006–2011 term. Pando lost his seat in the 2011 elections when he ran for re-election under the Force 2011 party of the former president's daughter, Keiko.

== Political career ==
His first political experience was in the 1993 municipal elections when he was elected as provincial councilor of Tarma. In the 1995 municipal elections he tried to run for re-election, but was not re-elected.

In the 2006 elections, he was elected Congressman, representing the Junín Region for the 2006–2011 term. Pando belongs to the Fujimorist Alliance for the Future party. Pando lost his seat in the 2011 elections when he ran for re-election under the Force 2011 party of the former president's daughter, Keiko.
