= Antonio León Zapata =

Peruvian politician (born 1949)

Third Vice President of the Congress
- In office 26 July 2009 – 26 July 2010
- President: Luis Alva Castro
- Preceded by: Fabiola Morales
- Succeeded by: Eduardo Espinoza

Member of Congress
- In office 26 July 2006 – 26 July 2011
- Constituency: Apurímac

Personal details
- Born: Antonio León Zapata; 7 January 1949 (age 77)
- Party: Union for Peru
- Other political affiliations: We Are Peru; United Left
- Occupation: Politician

Antonio León Zapata (born 7 January 1949) is a Peruvian politician. He is a Congressman representing Apurímac for the 2006–2011 term, and belongs to the Union for Peru party. He is the President of Parliament Group Popular Faction. He was Third Vice President of the Congress from 2009 to 2010
