= Rocío González (politician) =

Peruvian politician

Rocío de María González Zúñiga is a Peruvian politician. She was elected as a Congresswoman representing Arequipa for the 2006–2011 term. González was elected as a member of the Union for Peru party, but left the party after the election to form the Peruvian Democratic Party along with fellow Congress members Carlos Torres Caro and Gustavo Espinoza. She was removed from her post following her conviction on criminal charges related to her business stealing electric power from the government.
