= Gloria Ramos (politician) =

Peruvian politician

Gloria Deniz Ramos Prudencio (born December 2, 1955) is a Peruvian politician and a Congresswoman who represented Pasco for the 2006–2011 term. Ramos belongs to the Union for Peru party.
