= Michael Urtecho =

Peruvian engineer and politician

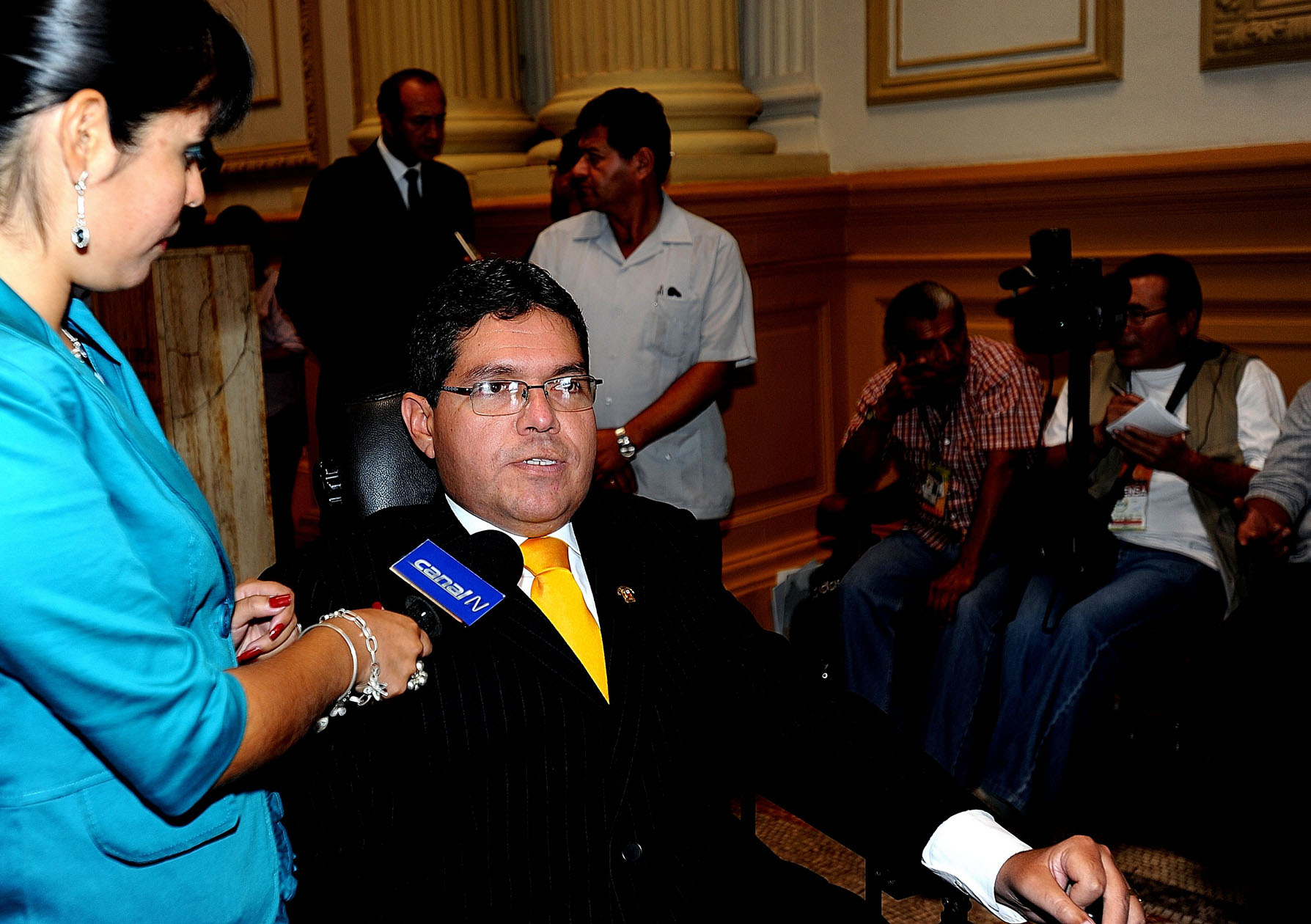
- Urtecho as Third Vice President of Congress in 2012

Third Vice President of the Congress
- In office 26 July 2011 – 26 July 2012
- President: Daniel Abugattás
- Preceded by: Eduardo Espinoza
- Succeeded by: José Luna

Second Vice President of the Congress
- In office 26 July 2009 – 26 July 2010
- President: Luis Alva Castro
- Preceded by: Álvaro Gutiérrez
- Succeeded by: Alda Lazo

Member of Congress
- In office 26 July 2006 – December 2013
- Succeeded by: Carmen Rosa Núñez
- Constituency: La Libertad

Personal details
- Born: Wilson Michael Urtecho Medina; 6 November 1969 (age 56) Trujillo, Trujillo Province, Peru, La Libertad, Peru
- Party: National Solidarity Party (2010-present); National Solidarity Alliance (2010-2011)
- Other political affiliations: National Renewal (2000-2010)
- Education: National University of Trujillo
- Occupation: Politician

Wilson Michael Urtecho Medina (born 6 November 1969) is a Peruvian engineer and politician, belonging to the National Solidarity and is a former Congressman representing the Department of La Libertad from 2006 until he was disqualified in December 2013, and he was banned from holding public office for a ten-year period. Urtecho was diagnosed with hypotonia as a child and uses a wheelchair.

== Education and career ==
He was born in Trujillo, on 6 November 1969. Since he was 2 years old, he has suffered from muscular hypotonia, a disease that makes him unable to walk. He completed his primary, secondary and tertiary studies. Then he studied Chemical Engineering obtaining an engineering degree from the National University of Trujillo.

Urtecho holds a Master in Chemical engineering. After his graduation, he started working as head of informatics of the La Libertad regional government and parallel as a consultant for the Institute for Disasters and Environment. In 2003, he changed to the Chavimochic special irrigation project, where he worked as an informatic engineer until he entered politics in 2006.

== Political career ==
=== Early political career ===
In 2000, Urtecho joined the conservative National Renewal party of Rafael Rey, where he acted as a regional delegate for La Libertad. He ran for a seat in the elections of that year under the Avancemos alliance, but he was not elected. The following year, in the 2001 elections, he once again ran for a seat in Congress, under the National Unity list, representing La Libertad, but he was not elected once again.

=== Congressman ===
In the 2006 elections, he was elected to Congress for the 2006–2011 term on the joint center-right National Unity list. In March 2010, he left the National Renewal to join the National Solidarity Party (PSN) of Lima's mayor Luis Castañeda. He became the regional political coordinator of that party in La Libertad. Urtecho was re-elected in the 2011 elections for another five-year term this time, on the National Solidarity Alliance. While he was in congress he was chairman of the Special Commission for Disability (CODIS). He served as Second Vice President of Congress during the 2009–2010 annual term and as Third Vice President of the Congress during the 2012–2013 annual term.

==== Disqualification ====
In September 2013, former staff members accused Urtecho of failing to pay them for work they had done. Urtecho stood down from the congressional ethics committee while an investigation was launched. A separate investigation into Urtecho's income commenced shortly after, following allegations of financial irregularities stemming from his personal spending habits. The final report published by the ethics committee called for Urtecho's suspension for illegal embellishment. In December 2013, the Congress voted to approve his desafuero and banned him from holding public office for a ten-year period. He was replaced in office by Carmen Rosa Núñez. On 24 August 2023, he was sentenced by the Special Criminal Chamber of the Supreme Court of the Judiciary to 22 years and 5 months in prison for late payments against his employees.
