= Álvaro Gutiérrez (politician) =

Peruvian politician (born 1964)

Álvaro Gutiérrez Cueva

Second Vice President of Congress
- In office 26 July 2008 – 26 July 2009
- President: Javier Velásquez; Alejandro Aguinaga
- Preceded by: Martha Moyano
- Succeeded by: Michael Urtecho

Member of Congress
- In office 26 July 2006 – 26 July 2011
- Constituency: Arequipa

Personal details
- Born: Álvaro Gonzalo Gutiérrez Cueva; 15 August 1964 (age 62) Arequipa, Peru
- Party: Union for Peru
- Education: Officers' School of the National Police of Peru
- Occupation: Politician

Álvaro Gonzalo Gutiérrez Cueva (born 15 August 1964) is a Peruvian politician. He represented Arequipa from 2006 to 2011 in the Congress of the Republic of Peru, and he belongs to the Union for Peru party.

== Political career ==
Gutiérrez was elected as a representative from the Arequipa electoral district in 2006 for the 2006–2011 parliamentary period with 48,417 votes. In 2006, he was expelled from the Peruvian Nationalist Party after criticizing Ollanta Humala and Gonzalo García Núñez, though he remained committed to Peruvian nationalism. In 2008, he was selected to serve on the board of Javier Velásquez as second vice president.

== Controversies ==
In 2010, Gutiérrez was suspended for 120 days from the Congress of the Republic after being denounced by the Peruvian Nationalist Party for having left the country for 5 months despite having only 52 days leave.

In 2019, he was criticized after mocking the death of former Minister of Defense José Huerta through his Twitter account.
