= Juana Huancahuari =

Peruvian politician

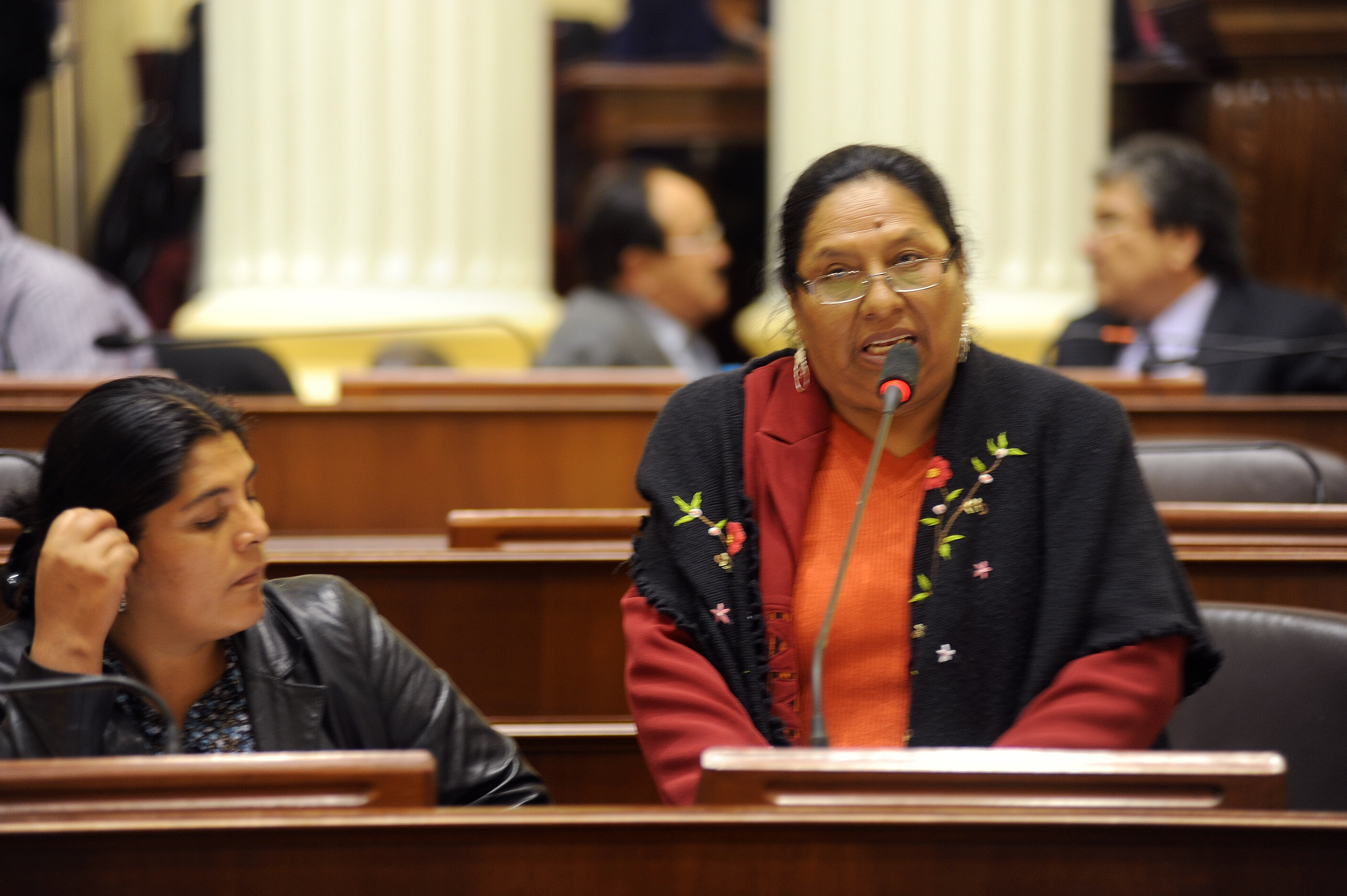

Member of Congress
- In office 28 July 2006 – 27 July 2011
- Constituency: Ayacucho

Personal details
- Born: 21 August 1969 (age 57) Lima, Peru
- Party: Union for Peru

Juana Aidé Huancahuari Páucar is an ethnic Quechua Peruvian politician. She was a Congresswoman representing Ayacucho for the period 2006–2011, and belongs to the Union for Peru party.
