= José Augusto Vargas =

Peruvian politician

Member of Congress
- In office 26 July 2006 – 26 July 2011
- Constituency: Loreto

Personal details
- Born: 12 January 1962 (age 64) Sarayacu, Loreto, Peru
- Party: Peruvian Aprista Party
- Occupation: Politician

José Augusto Vargas Fernández (born 12 January 1962) is a Peruvian politician and a former Congressman representing Loreto for the 2006–2011 term. Vargas belongs to the Peruvian Aprista Party.
