= Ministry of Defence (Peru) =

Government ministry of Peru

- Ministerio de Defensa
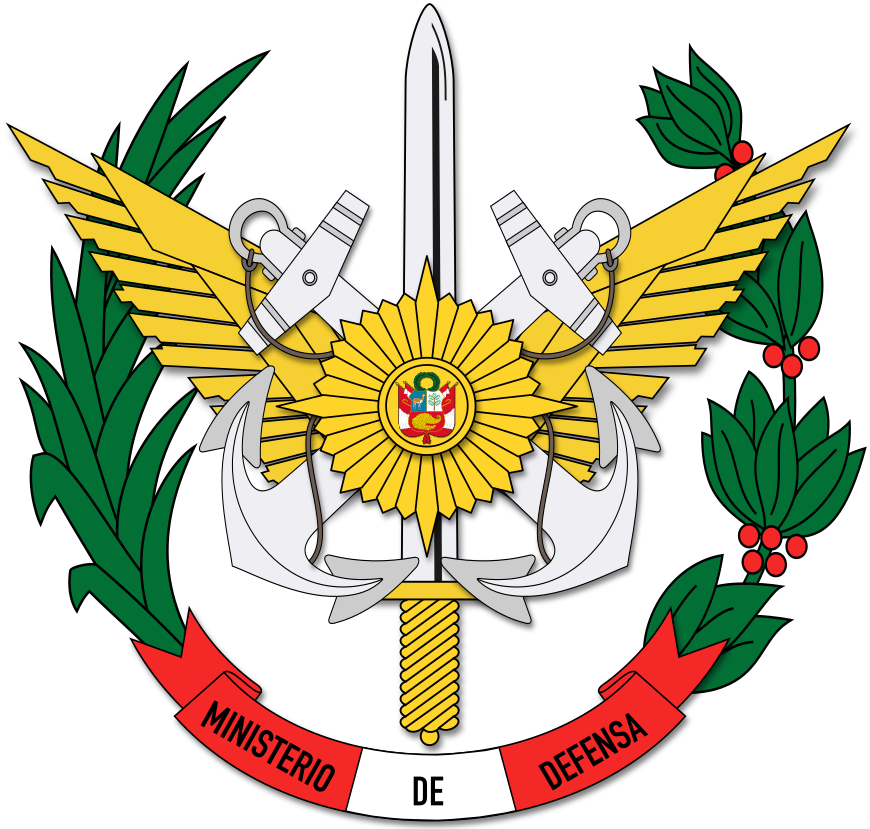
- Seal

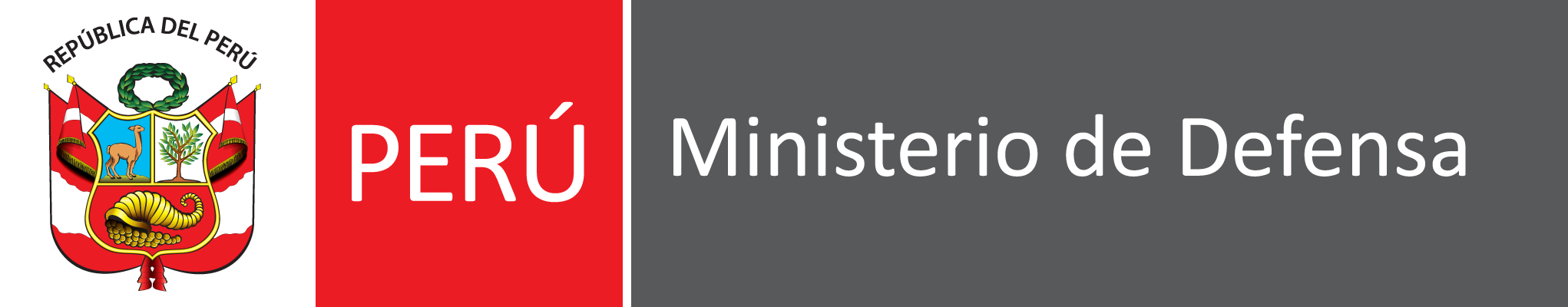
- Logo

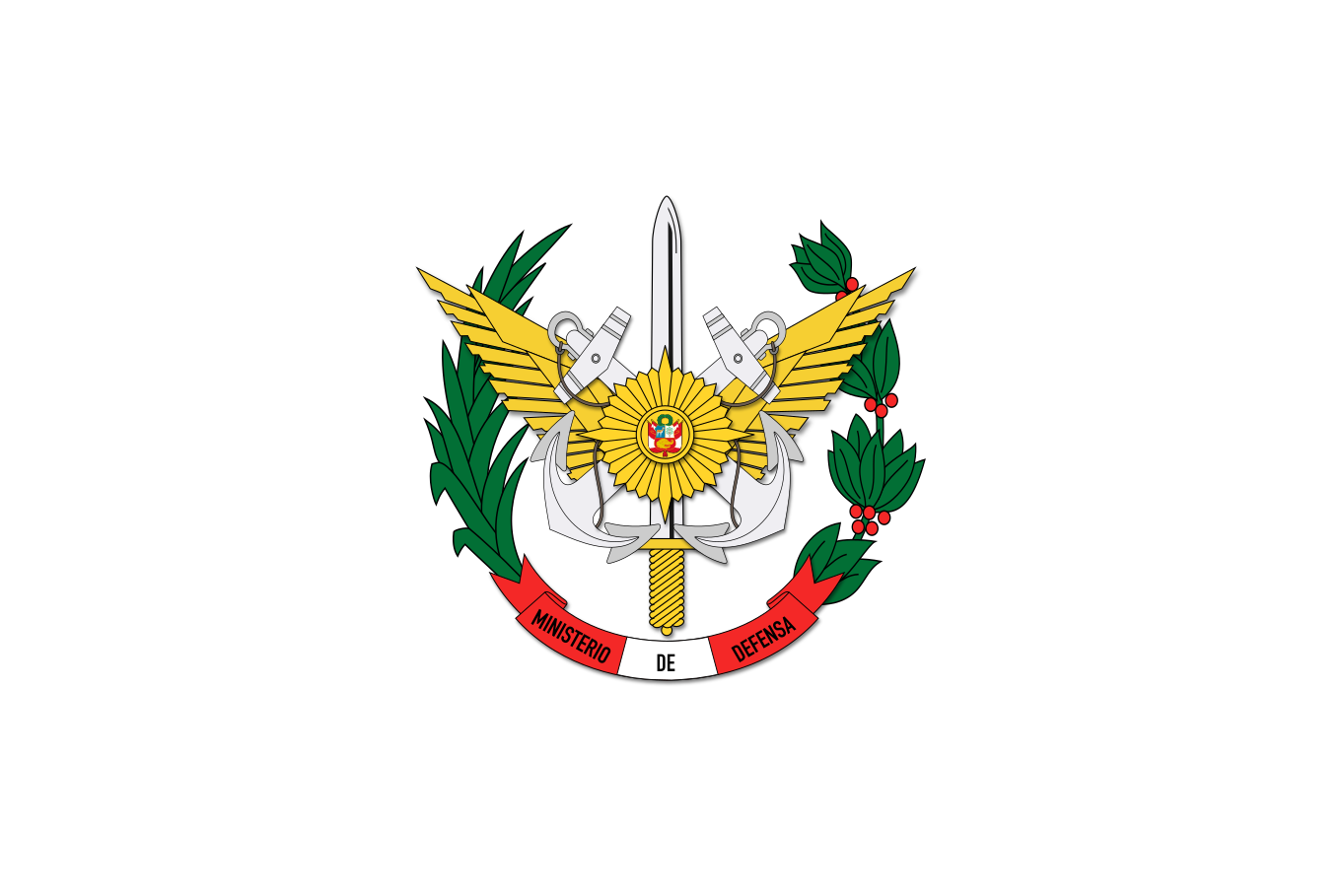
- Flags used by the ministry (top) and its minister (bottom)

Ministry overview
- Formed: April 1, 1987
- Preceding Ministry: Ministry of War; Ministry of the Navy; Ministry of Aeronautics
- Jurisdiction: Peru
- Headquarters: Quiñones Building, Avenida 28 de Julio, Lima, Peru
- Minister responsible: Rafael Belaunde Llosa
- Website: www.mindef.gob.pe

The Ministry of Defence (Spanish: Ministerio de Defensa, MINDEF) is the government ministry responsible for safeguarding national security on land, sea and air. It exercises command over the Peruvian Armed Forces composed of the Army, the Navy and the Air Force.

== History ==
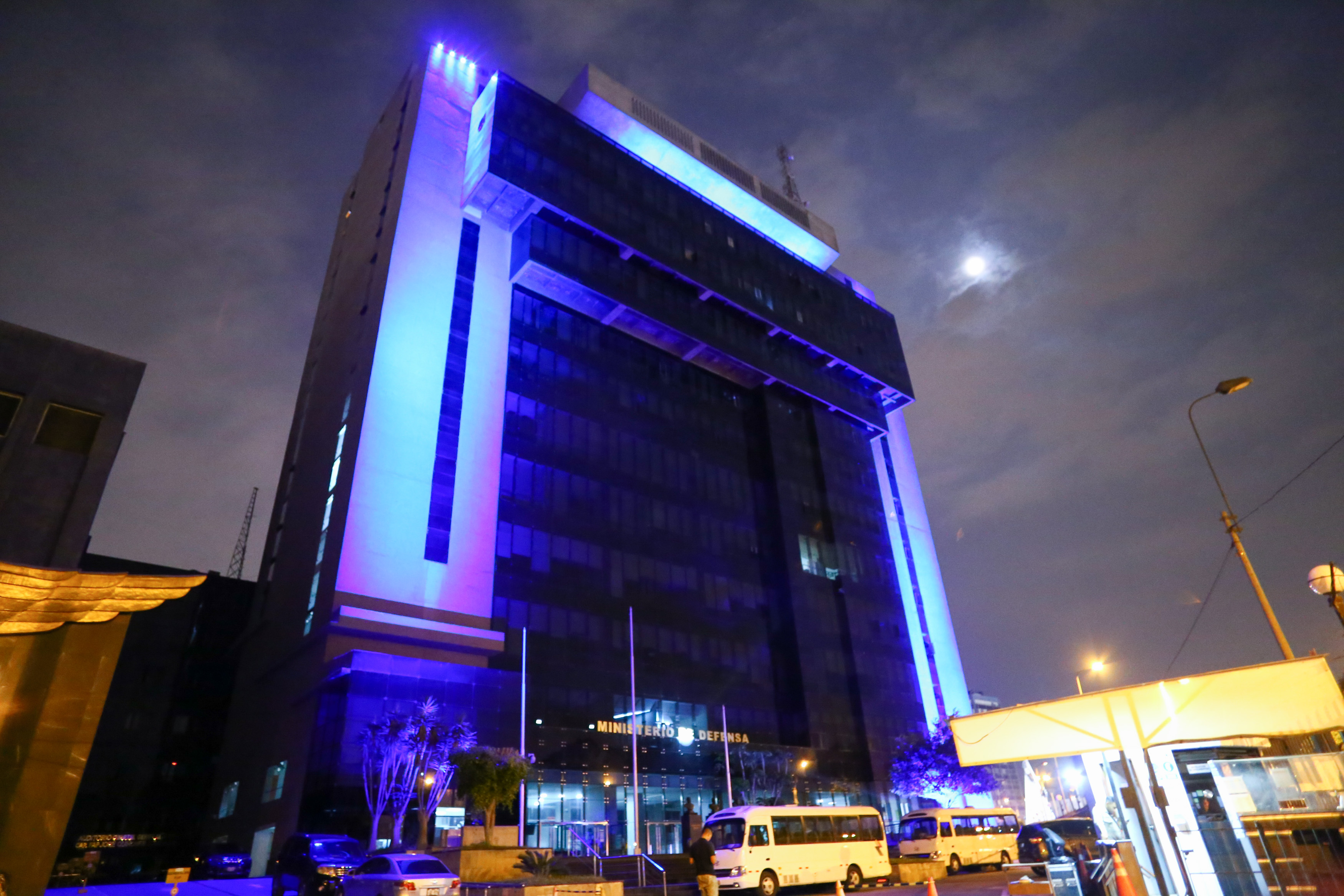
Quiñones Building, the ministry's headquarters.

In 1821, José de San Martín created three ministries of the Protectorate of Peru: those of Finance (Hacienda), War and Navy (Guerra y Marina) and Foreign Affairs (Relaciones Exteriores). They were again reestablished in 1844 after a series of changes in government.

On March 21, 1824, Simón Bolívar issued a decree in Trujillo reducing the three ministries to a single one, which would become the General Secretariat of Affairs of the Peruvian Republic (Secretaría General de los Negocios de la República Peruana), under Colonel José Gabriel Pérez. However, shortly thereafter, the Governing Junta repealed the decree, reestablishing the three ministries.

On October 13, 1920, during the second government of President Augusto B. Leguía, the Ministry of War and Navy was separated into two ministries through law N° 4003. The Navy Aviator Corps (Spanish: Cuerpo de Aviadores de la Armada) was created the same year as part of the Peruvian Navy, with the Navy ministry being reorganised as the Ministry of Navy and Aviation (Spanish: Ministerio de Marina y Aviación), combining both military entities until 1941, when the Ministry of Aviation (also known as the "Ministry of Aeronautics" Spanish: Ministerio de Aviación; Ministerio de Aeronáutica) was created.

The Ministry of Defence was created by Law No. 24654 on 1 April 1987, during the government of President Alan García. It absorbed the aforementioned Ministries of War, Navy and Aeronautics as well as the Joint Command of the Armed Forces and the National Defence Secretariat.

== Organisation ==
The ministry is organised as follows:

- Secretaría General (General Secretariat)
- Viceministerio de Asuntos Administrativos y Económicos (Viceministry of Administrative and Economic Matters)
- Viceministerio de Asuntos Logísticos y de Personal (Viceministry of Logistics and Personnel Matters)
- Dirección Nacional de Política y Estrategia (National Directorate of Politics and Strategy)
- Comando Conjunto de las Fuerzas Armadas (Joint Command of the Armed Forces)
- Ejército del Perú (Peruvian Army)
- Marina de Guerra del Perú (Peruvian Navy)
- Fuerza Aérea del Perú (Peruvian Air Force)

Entities under the ministry include:

- Benemérita Sociedad Fundadores de la Independencia
- Centro Nacional de Estimación, Prevención y Reducción del Riesgo de Desastres (CENEPRED)
- Comisión Nacional de Investigación y Desarrollo Aeroespacial (CONIDA)
- Escuela Nacional de Marina Mercante (ENAMM)
- Instituto Geográfico Nacional (IGN)
- Servicios Industriales de la Marina (SIMA)
- Fábrica de Armas y Municiones del Ejército (FAME S.A.C.)
- Servicio de Mantenimiento (SEMAN)
- Secretaría de Defensa Nacional
- Centro de Altos Estudios Nacionales (CAEN)
- Instituto Nacional de Defensa Civil (INDECI)

== List of ministers ==
No.	Portrait	Name	Took office	Left office	Party	President
Secretary of State of War and Navy (1821–1823)
		Bernardo de Monteagudo	August 3, 1821	October 25, 1821	Military	José de San Martín
Ministry of War and Navy (1823–1920)
		José de Rivadeneyra	June 6, 1829	April 16, 1831	Military	José de la Mar
		José de Rivadeneyra	June 6, 1829	April 16, 1831	Military	Agustín Gamarra
		José de Rivadeneyra	June 6, 1829	April 16, 1831	Military	Antonio Gutiérrez de la Fuente
		José de Rivadeneyra	June 6, 1829	April 16, 1831	Military	Agustín Gamarra
		Juan José Salas	April 16, 1831	April 24, 1832	Military	Agustín Gamarra
		Pedro Pablo Bermúdez	April 24, 1832	July 1832	Military	Agustín Gamarra
		José Mercedes Castañeda	July 1832	November 1833	Military	Agustín Gamarra
		Juan José Salas	November 1833	December 1833	Military	Agustín Gamarra
		Pedro Pablo Bermúdez	December 1833	December 20, 1833	Military	
		Pedro Pablo Bermúdez	December 1833	December 20, 1833	Military	Luis José de Orbegoso
		Juan Ángel Bujanda	May 20, 1835	June 24, 1835	Military	Felipe Salaverry
Ministers of Defence
1		Enrique López Albujar Trint	October 14, 1987	May 15, 1989	Army	Alan García
2		Julio Velásquez Giacarini	May 15, 1989	July 28, 1990	Army	Alan García
3		Jorge Torres Aciego	July 28, 1990	November 6, 1991	Army	Alberto Fujimori
4		Víctor Malca Villanueva	November 6, 1991	April 3, 1996	Army	Alberto Fujimori
5		Tomás Castillo Meza	April 3, 1996	July 18, 1997	Army	Alberto Fujimori
6		César Saucedo Sánchez	July 18, 1997	August 22, 1998	Army	Alberto Fujimori
7		Julio Salazar Monroe	August 22, 1998	April 16, 1999	Army	Alberto Fujimori
8		Carlos Bergamino Cruz	April 16, 1999	November 25, 2000	Army	Alberto Fujimori
9		Walter Ledesma Rebaza	November 25, 2000	July 28, 2001	Army	Valentín Paniagua
10		David Waisman	July 28, 2001	January 18, 2002	Possible Peru	Alejandro Toledo
11		Aurelio Loret de Mola Bohme	January 18, 2002	December 15, 2003	Independent	Alejandro Toledo
12		Roberto Chiabra León	December 15, 2003	August 16, 2005	Possible Peru	Alejandro Toledo
13		Marciano Rengifo Ruiz	August 16, 2005	July 28, 2006	Possible Peru	Alejandro Toledo
14		Allan Wagner Tizón	July 28, 2006	December 20, 2007	Independent	Alan García
15		Ántero Flores Aráoz	December 20, 2007	July 11, 2009	Christian People's Party	Alan García
16		Rafael Rey Rey	July 11, 2009	September 15, 2010	National Renewal	Alan García
17		Jaime Thorne León	September 15, 2010	July 28, 2011	Independent	Alan García
18		Daniel Mora Zevallos	July 28, 2011	December 10, 2011	Possible Peru	Ollanta Humala
19		Alberto Otárola	December 10, 2011	May 10, 2012	Independent	Ollanta Humala
20		José Antonio Urquizo	May 14, 2012	July 23, 2012	Peru Wins	Ollanta Humala
21		Pedro Cateriano	July 23, 2012	April 2, 2015	Independent	Ollanta Humala
22		Jakke Valakivi Álvarez	April 2, 2015	July 28, 2016	Independent	Ollanta Humala
23		Mariano González Fernández	July 28, 2016	November 28, 2016	Peruvians for Change	Pedro Pablo Kuczynski
24		Jorge Nieto Montesinos	December 5, 2016	January 3, 2018	Independent	Pedro Pablo Kuczynski
25		Jorge Kisic Wagner	January 9, 2018	April 2, 2018	Independent	Pedro Pablo Kuczynski; Martín Vizcarra
26		Jose Huerta	April 2, 2018	June 24, 2019†	Independent	Martín Vizcarra
27		Jorge Moscoso Flores	July 8, 2019	September 30, 2019	Independent	Martín Vizcarra
28		Walter Martos	October 3, 2019	August 6, 2020	Independent	Martín Vizcarra
29		Jorge Chávez Cresta	August 6, 2020	November 10, 2020	Independent	Martín Vizcarra
30		Walter Chávez Cruz	November 12, 2020	November 17, 2020	Independent	Manuel Merino
31		Nuria Esparch	November 18, 2020	July 28, 2021	Independent	Francisco Sagasti
32		Walter Ayala	July 29, 2021	November 15, 2021	Independent	Pedro Castillo
33		Juan Manuel Carrasco Millones	November 17, 2021	February 1, 2022	Independent	Pedro Castillo
34		José Luis Gavidia	February 1, 2022	August 24, 2022	Independent	Pedro Castillo
35		Richard Tineo Quispe	August 24, 2022	September 24, 2022	Independent	Pedro Castillo
36		Daniel Barragán Coloma	September 24, 2022	December 3, 2022	Independent	Pedro Castillo
37		Gustavo Bobbio Rosas	December 5, 2022	December 7, 2022	Independent	Pedro Castillo
38		Alberto Otárola	December 10, 2022	December 21, 2022	Independent	Dina Boluarte
39		Jorge Chávez Cresta	December 21, 2022	February 13, 2024	Independent	Dina Boluarte
40		Walter Astudillo Chávez	February 13, 2024	October 10, 2025	Independent	Dina Boluarte
41		César Díaz Peche	October 14, 2025	February 24, 2026	Independent	José Jerí José María Balcázar
42		Luis Arroyo Sánchez	February 24, 2026	March 17, 2026	Independent	José María Balcázar
43		Carlos Díaz Dañino	March 17, 2026	April 22, 2026	Independent	José María Balcázar
44		Amadeo Flores Carcagno	April 22, 2026	July 28, 2026	Independent	José María Balcázar
45		Rafael Belaunde Llosa	July 28, 2026		People's Liberty	Keiko Fujimori

== See also ==
- Peruvian Armed Forces
- List of wars involving the Inca Empire
- List of wars involving Peru
