= María del Rosario Sun =

Peruvian engineer

- María del Rosario Sun Kou
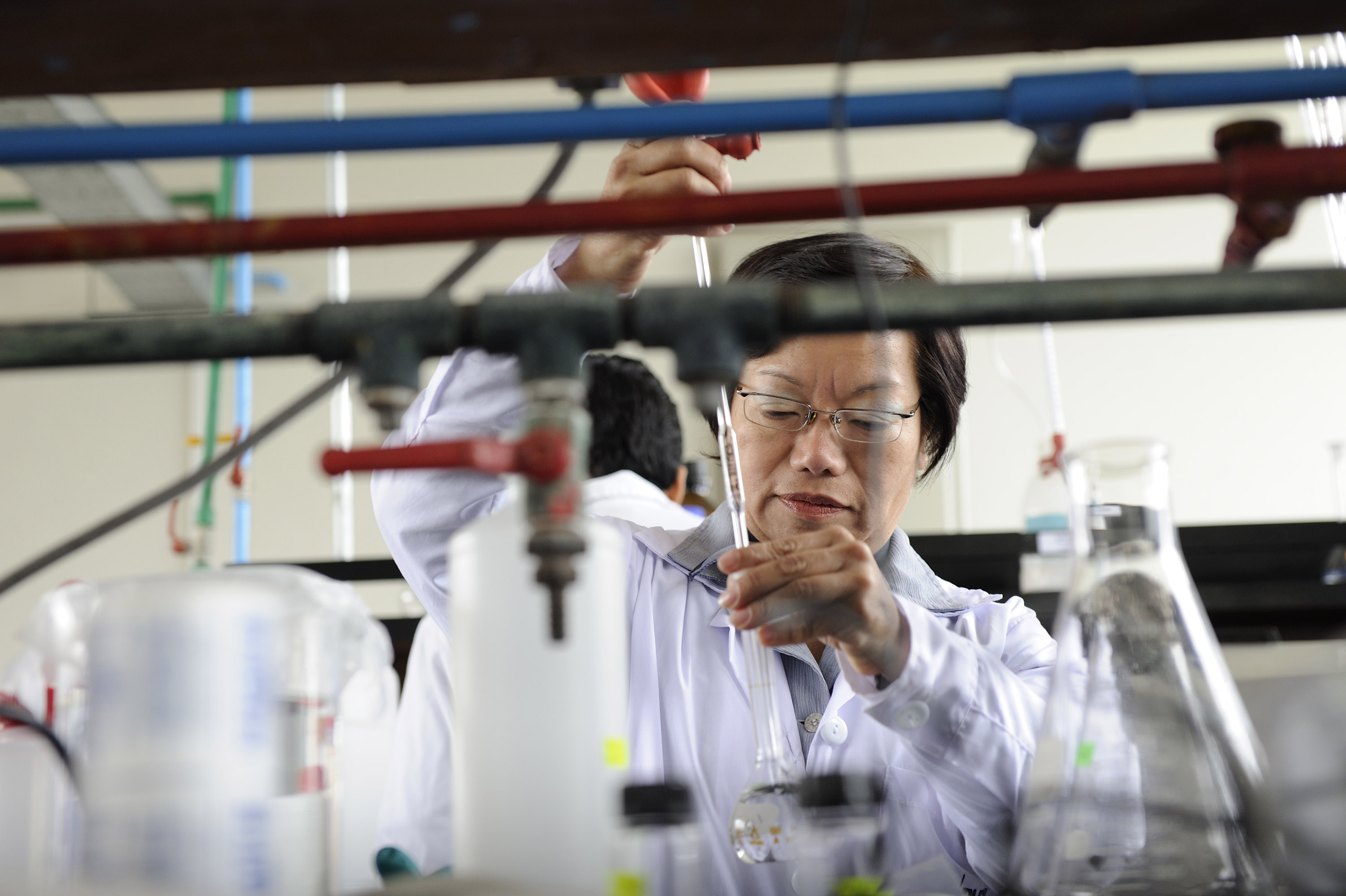
- Born: 1958 (age 67–68)
- Education: National University of Engineering Complutense University of Madrid
- Scientific career
- Fields: Chemical engineer, Materials Science, Adsorption, Catalysis
- Workplaces: Pontifical Catholic University of Peru

María del Rosario Sun Kou (born 1958, Lima) is a chemical engineer, researcher and professor in the Department of Sciences at the Pontificial Catholic University of Peru. She was awarded with a gold medal at the International Exhibition of Inventions in Geneva for her work on the "Electronic Nose" project, technology to evaluate the quality and authenticity of wines.

Sun has made the role of principal investigator in the field of materials science, focusing her work on the processes of adsorption and catalysis. She has published several scientific articles on these topics and has worked on the application of these processes to industrial production in the country.

== Biography ==
=== Early life and education ===
María del Rosario Sun Kou showed an early interest in chemistry during her education at the Great School Unit for Women in Pucallpa. Her participation in a national school science competition increased her curiosity to investigate chemical phenomena, which impulsed her to enter the National University of Engineering, where she obtained her degree in chemical engineering.

She became a professor at the National University of Engineering. At the same time, Sun began a master's degree in Chemical Engineering.

She completed a doctorate in Chemical Sciences, specializing in heterogeneous catalysis at the Complutense University of Madrid. Then, she carried out postdoctoral studies on adsorbents at the KU Leuven, Belgium.

== Career ==
Sun developed projects aimed at sustainability and the treatment of pollutants. Since 2005, she has held the position of professor of chemistry at the Pontifical Catholic University of Peru (PUCP).

In 2006, she contributed to a project on the adsorption of phenolic compounds using modified clays and marine algae from Peru's coastline. In 2011, a project focused on water purification for rural areas, based on synthetic hydrogels and activated carbons obtained from Amazonian fruits.

In 2012, Sun worked on a scientific project based on the recovery of hair dyes using adsorbents derived from biological waste, in order to reduce pollution. She received recognition from L'Oréal-Peru, Unesco and National Council for Science, Technology and Technological Innovation (Concytec).

In 2017, INDECOPI granted a patent to the project "Procedure to obtain activated carbon from aguaje seed (Mauritia flexuosa) through a chemical treatment". This process aims to utilize aguaje waste to produce a material with adsorptive properties useful in industrial and environmental applications.

Also, a patent was granted to the project "Electronic nose with zeolite-coated sensors and closed-loop temperature control", which focuses on the detection of volatile compounds to differentiate commercial and artisanal wines, check quality and classify different types of wines. The project won a gold medal at the International Exhibition of Inventions Geneva in 2021.

== Works ==
- "Catalytic activity of pillar clays in methanol conversion". This article explores the use of pillar clays as catalysts in methanol conversion. Techniques such as X-ray diffraction were used to analyze performance.
- "Chemical Modification of Clays and Their Application in Dye Retention". This study modifies natural clay from Peru using a thermo-acidic treatment, enhancing its adsorption capacity for textile dyes. The activated clay adsorbs dyes up to 30 times more than natural clay.
- "Use of Multivariate Analysis for Determining the Most Influential Physicochemical Properties of Activated Carbon in Cadmium Removal". This study uses multivariate analysis and a polynomial regression model to understand how activated carbon properties, such as porosity and surface acidity, influence cadmium adsorption. The goal is to develop materials tailored to specific pollutant characteristics.
- "The Interaction of Metallic Ions onto Activated Carbon Surface Using Computational Chemistry Software". Explores the adsorption of heavy metals (Pb, Cd, Cr) onto activated carbon using computational modeling. Oxidation increased surface acidity and electron density, enhancing adsorption capacity.

== Awards and honors ==
- Member of the editorial board of the TECNIA Journal, National University of Engineering, 1998.
- Award granted by L'Oréal Peru, the Peruvian National Commission for Cooperation with UNESCO, and the National Council of Science, Technology, and Technological Innovation (Concytec), for the project "Recovery of Hair Dyes Using Absorbents from Biological Waste for Wastewater Treatment", 2012.
- Ibero-American Federation of Catalysis Societies. Appointed representative of Peru in FISOCAT, 2017.
- Recognition for Research PUCP 2017.
- Recognition from the National Institute for the Defence of Competition and the Protection of Intellectual Property (Indecopi). Received a silver medal at the 13th Korea International Women's Invention Exposition (KIWIE), 2020.
- Research Recognition RI PUCP 2020.
- Experience and career in the publication “Scientists of Peru: 24 stories to discover”, by Concytec in 2021.
- Awarded a gold medal. Project: “Electronic nose with zeolite-coated sensors”, used for the analysis of volatile compounds that impact the quality results of alcoholic beverages, 2021.
