= Renovación Nacional =

Renovación Nacional may refer to:

- National Renewal (Chile)
- National Renewal (Peru)
