= National Institute of Quality =

The National Institute of Quality (INACAL) is a specialized technical public organization affiliated with the Ministry of Production (Peru). It was created in 2014 by Legislative Decree No. 30224, and began its functions on June 1, 2015. The main objective of INACAL is the standardization, accreditation, and metrology of regulations that govern various sectors of the Peruvian market, to contribute to the development and compliance with the national quality policy. Its purpose is to certify the quality of local Peruvian products, align them with international standards, and promote their export. Previously, this task was the responsibility of the National Institute for the Defense of Competition and the Protection of Intellectual Property (INDECOPI). INACAL is a member organization of ISO and COPANT.

== Functions ==
According to Article 6 of Supreme Decree No. 004-2015, some of the functions of INACAL are:

Conduct the National Quality System.

Develop the proposal for the National Quality Policy and present it to the National Council for Quality (CONACAL).

Regulate matters of standardization, accreditation, and methodology in accordance with international standards.

Manage, promote, and monitor the implementation of the National Quality Policy.

Act as an international representative and participate in standardization, metrology, and accreditation activities within the framework of current regulations.

Promote a culture of quality, encouraging public and private institutions to utilize the quality infrastructure.
