= Luis Galarreta =

Prime Minister and First Vice President of Peru since 2026

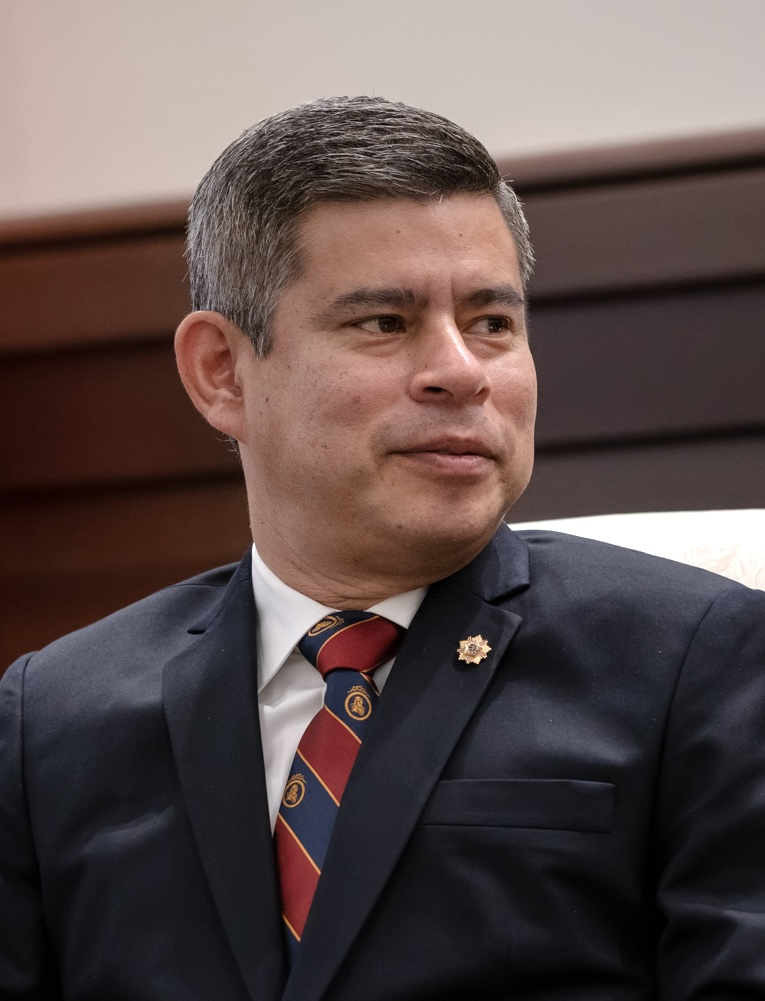
- Galarreta in 2019

Prime Minister of Peru
- Incumbent
- Assumed office 28 July 2026
- President: Keiko Fujimori
- Preceded by: Luis Arroyo Sánchez

First Vice President of Peru
- Incumbent
- Assumed office 28 July 2026 Serving with Miki Torres
- President: Keiko Fujimori
- Preceded by: Dina Boluarte (2022)

President of Congress
- In office 27 July 2017 – 26 July 2018
- Vice President: 1st Vice President; Mario Mantilla; 2nd Vice President; Richard Acuña; 3rd Vice President; Mauricio Mulder
- Preceded by: Luz Salgado
- Succeeded by: Daniel Salaverry

Secretary General of Popular Force
- Incumbent
- Assumed office 5 October 2019
- President: Keiko Fujimori
- Preceded by: Luz Salgado
Additional offices
Vice President of the Andean Parliament
In office 5 August 2025 – 5 August 2026
President	Sara Condori; René Camacho
Preceded by	Leslye Lazo
Succeeded by	Maali Olga Betty Del Pomar Saettone
Deputy Secretary General of Popular Force
In office 7 December 2018 – 5 October 2019
President	Keiko Fujimori
Preceded by	Miki Torres
Succeeded by	Vacant
Third Vice President of Congress
In office 27 July 2015 – 26 July 2016
President	Luis Iberico
Preceded by	Esther Capuñay
Succeeded by	Luciana León

Representative of the Andean Parliament
- Incumbent
- Assumed office 28 July 2021
- Constituency: Peru

Member of Congress
- In office 27 July 2006 – 16 March 2020
- Constituency: Lima

Member of the Lima City Council
- In office 1 January 2003 – 26 July 2006

Personal details
- Born: Luis Fernando Galarreta Velarde; 12 March 1971 (age 55) Lima, Peru
- Party: FP (since 2015)
- Other political affiliations: ML (1989–1993); RN (1997–2008); PPC (2008–2015)
- Spouse: Maria Luisa Carrillo
- Children: 2
- Education: University of San Martín de Porres (LLB)

Luis Fernando Galarreta Velarde (Spanish pronunciation: [ˈlwis ɣalaˈreta]; born 12 March 1971) is a Peruvian politician who has served as First Vice President and Prime Minister of Peru since 2026. He previously served as a member of the Congress of the Republic of Peru representing Lima from 2006 to 2020 and was President of the Congress for the 2017–2018 annual term. Galarreta was part of the presidential ticket of Keiko Fujimori in the 2021 elections that lost the elections to the Pedro Castillo ticket, however, he was elected to the Andean Parliament. He became First Vice President of Peru following Fujimori's victory in the 2026 elections.

Luis Galarreta is under investigation for money laundering, abuse of authority, criminal organization, electoral fraud and illegal appointment.

== Early life and education ==
Luis Fernando Galarreta Velarde was born on 12 March 1971 in Lima. Son of Aníbal Galarreta, a native of the La Libertad region, and Rita Velarde from Lima. According to him, he told the Extraordinary program in 2013, his mother took the pill Thalidomide, which was used to relieve nausea in pregnant women. Currently, the drug is prohibited from being marketed because it was found to cause abnormalities in the extremities of fetuses, which caused Galarreta to be born without hands. Galarreta has hooks for hands.

He completed his primary and secondary school studies at the James Monroe School in the city of Lima, also attended the National Rehabilitation Institute of Callao where he learned the use of his prostheses.

He studied Law and Political Science at the University of San Martín de Porres (1990 - 1997), obtaining a bachelor's degree. He has a specialization in Banking and Finance at the San Ignacio de Loyola Higher Educational Institution (1993 - 1995).

He has been in charge of the administration of various social projects. In the Asociación Civil Pro Educación he was responsible for the "TIP's" program aimed at street children in the city of Lima. He is the Executive President of the Asociación Civil Pro Deber, which he formed with a group of colleagues from the university. Pro Deber is aimed at promoting citizen duties and strengthening the political and economic principles of a culture of freedom.

== Political career ==
=== Early political career ===
From 1997 on he was committed to the NPO "Pro Education" of the conservative National Renewal (RN) party leader Rafael Rey Rey. He also joined Rey's party at the same time, the RN. In 1999 he represented the National Council for the Integration of Persons with Disability adjunct to the Labour Ministry. In 2002, he was elected councillor of Lima for a four-year term under the National Unity (UN) alliance in which Luis Castañeda was elected Mayor of Lima.

=== Congressman ===
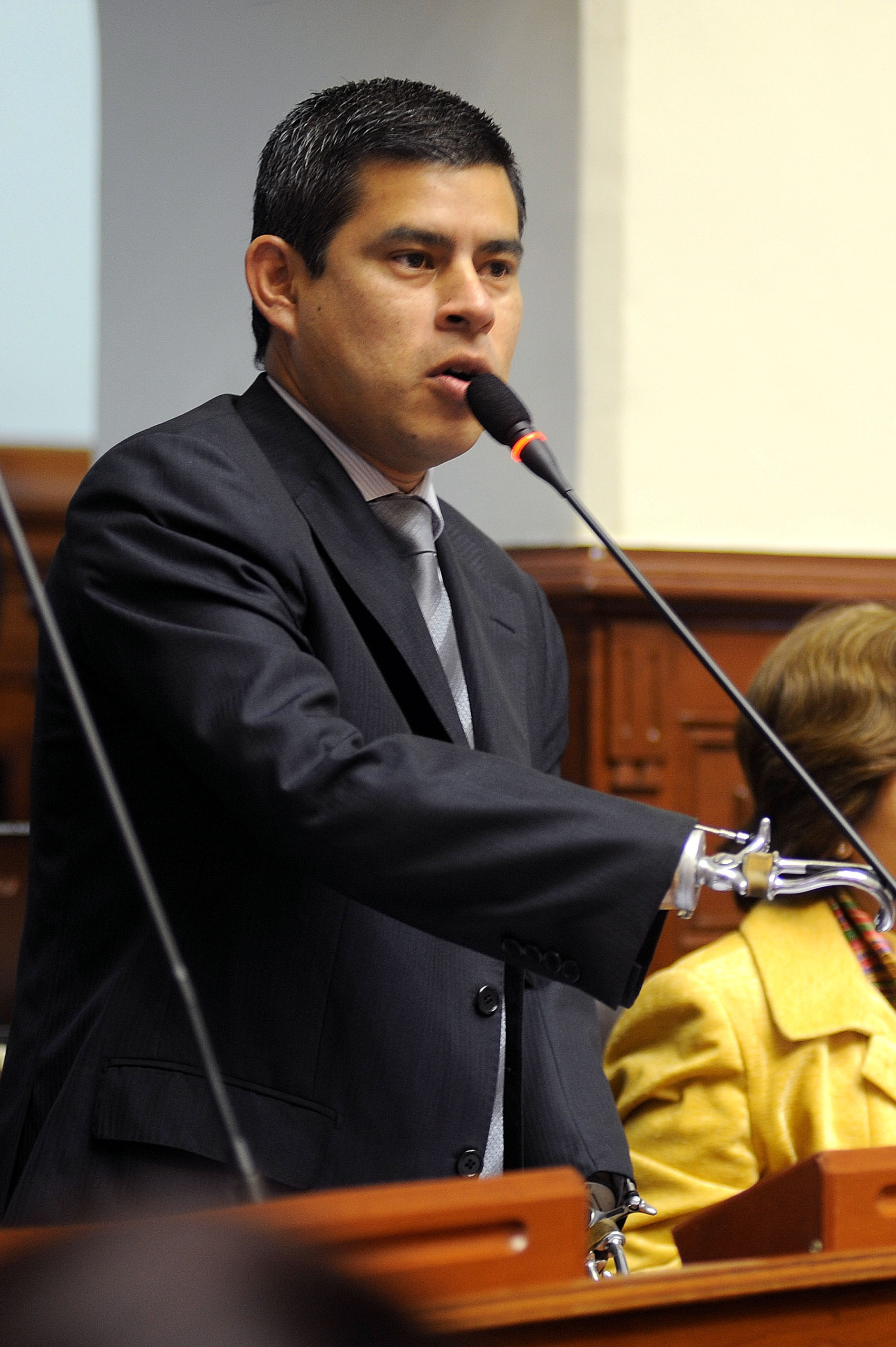
Galarreta in 2010.

In the 2006 election, he was elected to Congress for the 2006–2011 term for the same group. When the UN broke in 2008, Galarreta decided to stay on the National Unity bench, now congruent with the Christian People's Party (PPC). Consequently, he left the RN, and later, he was a member of the Political Commission of the PPC. In the 2011 election, he was re-elected for another five-year term on the ticket of the Alliance for the Great Change, to which the Christian democrats now belong. He left the Christian People's Party in 2015 and joined the Fujimorist Popular Force.

He was Third Vice President of the Congress during the 2015-2016 annual term under the leadership of Luis Iberico.

Five years later, in the 2016 election, he was re-elected for the 2016–2021 term this time, on the ticket of the Fujimorist Popular Force of Keiko Fujimori; however, his term was cut short following to the dissolution of the Congress by President Martín Vizcarra in 2019 and served as a member of the Permanent Assembly until 16 March 2020, the date when the new Congress was sworn in.

He was the President of the Congress for the 2017-2018 annual term. His election as President of the Congress generated controversy since it would make him the first President of Congress with a disability.

=== Post-congressional term, vice presidency and premiership ===
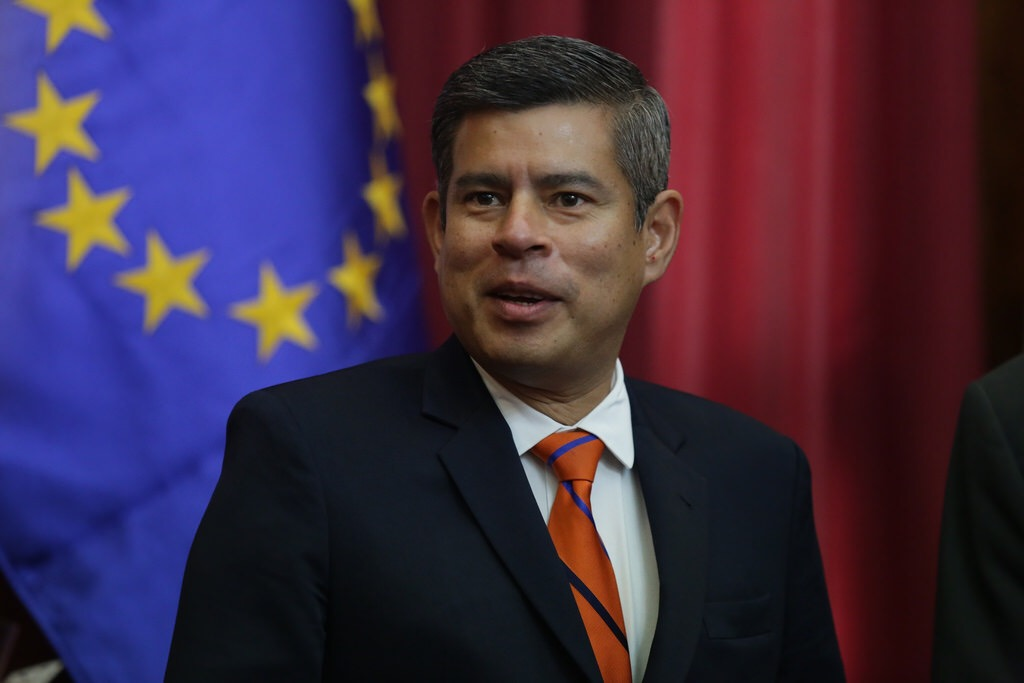
Galarreta in 2018.

On 30 October 2020, Keiko Fujimori, announced through her Twitter account that she made her presidential candidacy official in internal elections in view of the elections of the following year, together with Galarreta for the first vice presidency and the former Lima Lieutenant Mayor Patricia Juárez for the second vice presidency, being the formula chosen in December by the votes of 37 party delegates, as it was the only list, and after this the campaign began.

At the same time, he ran for a seat in the Andean Parliament, heading the list of his party after the referendum on the reform of the Constitution of Peru in 2018 proposed by then-President Martín Vizcarra approved through popular consultation the prohibition of immediate reelection of parliamentarians to the Congress of Peru.

The general election resulted with their presidential ticket defeated by the Free Peru ticket led by Pedro Castillo. However, he was elected to the Andean Parliament.

Galarreta signed the Madrid Charter, becoming a member of an international group of right-wing and far-right individuals organized by Spanish party Vox.

In 2026, Galarreta was nominated by Keiko Fujimori again to run for the first vice presidency in the 2026 Peruvian general election for the Popular Force ticket. The ticket was elected in the second round. Following Fujimori's inauguration on 28 July, Galarreta was appointed as prime minister.

== Personal life ==
On 1 April 2021, Keiko Fujimori announced in her Twitter that Galarreta tested positive for COVID-19.

== Notes ==
Political offices
Preceded by Luz Salgado	President of Congress; 2017–2018	Succeeded by Daniel Salaverry
Vacant Title last held by Dina Boluarte	First Vice President of Peru; 2026–present	Incumbent
Preceded by Luis Arroyo Sánchez	Prime Minister of Peru; 2026–present	Incumbent
