= José Huerta =

Peruvian politician (1948–2019)

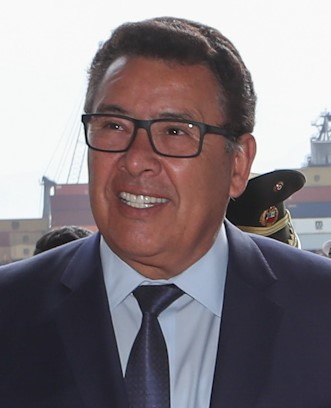
- Huerta in April 2018

Minister of Defense of Peru
- In office 2 April 2018 – 24 June 2019
- President: Martín Vizcarra
- Prime Minister: César Villanueva; Salvador del Solar
- Preceded by: Jorge Kisic Wagner
- Succeeded by: Jorge Moscoso

Personal details
- Born: José Modesto Huerta Torres; 15 June 1948 Arequipa, Peru
- Died: 24 June 2019 (aged 71) Santa María de Nieva, Peru
- Cause of death: Myocardial infarction
- Occupation: Military
- Awards: Order of Merit for Distinguished Services in the Commander degree

Military service
- Allegiance: Peru
- Branch/service: Peruvian Army
- Rank: General

José Huerta (15 June 1948 – 24 June 2019) was a Peruvian politician who served as Minister of Defence from 2 April 2018 until his death.

== Biography ==
He was a graduate of the Chorrillos Military School, where he held the first position in the Artillery weapons.

He studied Antiaircraft Artillery in the Soviet Union and participated in courses of Command and Staff, Superior Intelligence, Development and National Defense in the Center for Higher National Studies (CAEN).

He had a Master's degree in Defense and National Development from CAEN and Planning and Administration of Resources for Defense, at the National Defense University - Washington, D.C.

He was a visiting professor at the School of the Americas (1988 -1989).

He has been an aide to the President of the Republic of Peru (1984-1985).

In his military career he has developed as Chief of Staff of the "Frente Huallaga" (1993), Chief of the Artillery Group "Bolognesi" (1994), General Commander of the 31st Infantry Brigade - Emergency Zone - VRAEM (1996- 1997), director of the Superior School of War of the Army (1998), general commander of the Military Region of the Center (2000) and inspector general of the Army (2001-2002).

He went to retirement in September 2000 and in the Government of Valentín Paniagua he was reincorporated into the Army (December 2000).

He was the Inspector General of the Army from 2001 to 2002.

In the international arena, he has been a military attaché to the Embassy of Peru in Venezuela (1995), the Embassy of Peru in the United States (2003) and has presided over Army delegations in meetings with his counterparts in Argentina, Bolivia, Brazil, Colombia, Chile and Ecuador.

In his retirement he was representative of the Ministry of Defense for the coordination of the problems of Haiti, in Argentina and Peru and in seminars for the establishment of Mutual Confidence Measures between Peru and Chile.

Between 2004 and 2005 he was General Director of Policy and Strategy of the Ministry of Defense.

Between 2011 and 2012, he was executive director of the Council of South American Defense, a body of the Union of South American Nations (UNASUR) attached to the Ministry of Defense.

In August 2016, he was appointed Inspector General of the Ministry of Defense; position he held until January 2018, when he was appointed Vice Minister of Defense Policy.

On June 24, 2019, at 10AM he died on secondment, when he went to the department of Amazonas. The cause was a heart attack.
