= List of wars involving Peru =

The following is a list of wars involving the Republic of Peru and its predecessor state, the Viceroyalty of Peru.

== Spanish Peru (1532–1824) ==
Conflict	Peru and allies	Opponents	Results
Spanish conquest of the Inca Empire (1532–1572): Conquest of Bolivia; Conquest of Chile; Conquest of Ecuador; 2nd Inca-Spanish War; Manco Inca Rebellion; Titu Cusi's Vilcabamba campaign; Tupac Amaru I's Vilcabamba campaign	Spanish Empire (1537–1554): (Spanish Empire) New Castile (1529–1542); (Spanish Empire) New Toledo (1534–1542); (Spanish Empire) Viceroyalty of Peru (1542–1572); Inca Empire (from 1533); Native allies; Cañari; Caxamarcas (various groups); Huancas; Chankas; Huaylas; Chachapoyas; Huáscaran Incas	Inca Empire (1532–1536); Neo-Inca State (1537‍–‍1572)	Spanish victory: Former Incan Empire incorporated into the Spanish Empire
Spanish conquest of New Granada (1525–1540): Expedition of Sebastián de Belalcázar; Battle of Tocarema	Spanish Empire: Crown of Castile; Klein-Venedig	Muisca Confederation; Calima; Nariño; Quimbaya; San Agustín; Tairona; Zenú	Spanish victory: Conquest of present-day Colombia by the Spanish Empire, integration into the New Kingdom of Granada and Viceroyalty of Peru
Grijalva expedition to the South Pacific (1537–1542)	Spanish Empire: New Spain; New Castile (since 1539)	Hostile indigenous people of Polynesia mutinous Spaniards	The ship is lost in New Guinea, where almost the entire crew died. The rest are rescued by the Portuguese from Ternate.
Civil Wars between conquerors of Peru (1537–1554)	Pizarristas: New Castile; Vaca de Castro Royalists: Spanish Empire; Viceroyalty of Peru; Royalists: Viceroyalty of Peru; Viceroyalty authorities: Viceroyalty of Peru	Almagristas: New Toledo; Neo-Inca State (until 1542); Almagristas: New Castile-New Toledo royal union; Gonzalistas: Encomenderos; Francisco Hernandes Girón rebels: Encomenderos	1° Pizarrist victory: New Castile stays with Cuzco. Deaths of: Diego de Almagro "el viejo" and Francisco Pizarro. 2° Crown of Castille victory: Abolition of the hereditary governorships of New Castile and New Toledo after the attempt of unification and independence of the Kingdom of Spain. Establishment of the Viceroyalty of Peru to ensure compliance with the orders of the King of Spain [mostly Laws of Burgos]. Death of Diego Almagro "el mozo" and Cristóbal Vaca de Castro. 3° Stalemate: The encomiendas in Peru are gradually annulled through the New Laws and Laws of the Indies until the 18th century; death of Gonzalo Pizarro and Blasco Núñez Vela. 4° Viceroyalty of Peru victory: Death of Francisco Hernández Girón and end of the rebellions of the encomenderos. Consolidation of Indian Law to protect the natural rights of the indigenous person in Peru.
Orellana Expedition to Amazon river (1541–1542)	Viceroyalty of Peru: Province of Quito	Hostile Amazonian peoples	Stalemate: Discovery of the Amazon River until the Atlantic Ocean, but Spaniards retreat due to diseases (dying Francisco de Orellana).; Start of catholic missions on Maynas.
Spanish conquest and colonization of Argentina (1543–1593): Expeditions in Tucumán; Diego de Rojas entry to Tucumán; Western colonizing current; Northern colonizing current; (1543–1593)	Spanish Empire: Viceroyalty of Peru; Province of Charcas; Governorate of Paraguay; Captaincy General of Chile; Indian auxiliaries	Indigenous peoples: northern tehuelches; Diaguitas; Guarani	Victory of the Spanish conquistadors.: These territories weren't any unified entity and became part of the Viceroyalty of Peru as the Governorate of the Río de la Plata.
First Communero Rebellion (1544)	Viceroyalty of Peru: Paraguay	Comuneros: Encomendero	Defeat of the royal authorities: Establishment of Domingo Martínez de Irala as governor by popular election of the Encomenderos, according to The Royal Decree of September 12, 1537, which determined the charge of a governor in Paraguay would be elected by the vote of the inhabitants.
Arauco War (1546–until the end of the 17th century; and sporadically the 18th century)	Spanish Empire: (Spanish Empire) Captaincy General of Chile; Mapuche allies	Mapuches, Pehuenches, Huilliches, Cuncos and other groups	Stalemate: Spanish invasion of Araucanía permanently reversed around 1600.; Failure of the Spanish evangelization strategy in Araucanía.; Stabilization of frontiers, development of Mapuche–Spanish diplomacy and trade since the mid-17th century.
Bandeirantes raids from Brazil (1557-18th century): Expedition led by Antônio Raposo Tavares; Expedition of Luís Pedroso de Barros	Viceroyalty of Peru: Maynas Government; Charcas; Viceroyalty of New Granada (since 1717) Viceroyalty of the Río de la Plata (since 1777): Paraguay; Jesuit missions	Colonial Brazil: Colonia del Sacramento; Bandeirantes	Stalemate: The Amazon forest is divided between Peru-Spain and Brazil-Portugal with the Treaty of Madrid (1750) and First Treaty of San Ildefonso.
Calchaquí Wars (1560–1667): 2nd Calchaqui War	Spanish Empire: Viceroyalty of Peru; Charcas	Diaguita confederation	Victory of the Spanish Empire: Spanish conquest of the Tucumán region; Relocation of tens of thousands of people belonging to the Diaguita kingdoms in Pueblo de Indios.
Spanish-Chiriguano War (1564-17th century)	Spanish Empire: Viceroyalty of Peru; Charcas	Ava Guaraní people	Victory: Successful Spanish conquest of the Eastern Bolivian region.; Establishment of Jesuit Missions of Moxos and Jesuit Missions of Chiquitos
Bayano Wars (1548–1582)	Spanish Empire	Bayanos of Panama	Spanish victory
Spanish expeditions to Solomon and Vanuatu (1567–1606): First Spanish expedition to Solomon	Spanish Empire: Viceroyalty of Peru; Captaincy General of the Philippines	Hostile indigenous people of Polynesia	Defeat: Discovery of multiple islands between the Golfo de la Concepción and Golfo de la Candelaria (the sea between Peru and Tuvalu), such as the Solomon Islands archipelago and the Vanuatu archipelago.; Possible Spanish discovery of Australia in their search of Terra Australis Ignota.; Colonization attempts failed due to disease and bellicosity of the inhabitants, as well as war crimes by explorers
Colonial front of the Eighty Years' War and the Thirty Years' War (1568–1648): Dutch piracy in Latin America; Dutch expedition to Valdivia; Battle of Carelmapu; Castro combat	(Spain) Spanish Empire European co-belligerent: (Habsburg monarchy) Holy Roman Empire (1629, 1632, 1635) (Note: During the Thirty Years' War, the Holy Roman Empire supported Spain with Imperial forces on the Low Countries front in 1629, 1632, and 1635, although it never directly waged war against the Dutch Republic.) Native overseas allies (from the 1600s) Pro-Habsburg alliance pre-1635: Habsburg Monarchy; (Spain) Spanish Empire; Bavaria; Catholic League; Lorraine; Post-1635 Peace of Prague: Holy Roman Empire; (Spain) Spanish Empire; Denmark–Norway	Dutch Republic (from 1588) (Note: The nascent political organization reached by the rebellious northern provinces with the Union of Utrecht on 23 January 1579, Groenveld 2009, pp. 16–17 Groenveld 2009, pp. 10–11 would be followed by the Act of Abjuration on 26 July 1581, declaring de facto independence from Spain, Groenveld 2009, pp. 18–19 to finally become a republic by approving the Deduction of Vrancken on 12 April 1588.): (Dutch Republic) States-General (1576–1588) (Note: With the Pacification of Ghent on 8 November 1576, the States General of the Seventeen Provinces, except Luxemburg, managed to articulate a joint Catholic-Protestant political and military rebellion against the Spanish imperial government. But various political, religious and military circumstances caused this union to collapse in 1579, the year in which the Netherlands was divided in two, with the Catholic provinces of the south joining in the Union of Arras on 6 January and the Protestant provinces of the north (in general terms) at the Union of Utrecht of 23 January. The southern provinces would once again be under the orbit of the Spanish government, while the northern provinces would reaffirm their political and military alliance against Spain.); Dutch rebels (c. 1566/68–1576) (Note: The rebellious provinces of the Netherlands managed to form a joint political and military rebellion against Spain after the Pacification of Ghent on 8 November 1576.) European allies: Kingdom of England (1585–1604, 1625–1630); Kingdom of France (1589–1598, from 1635); Anjou (1578–1583) (Note: In 1576, the States General called, at the suggestion of William the Silent, Francis, Duke of Anjou, to request his protection. In 1578 Anjou intervened with an army of French in the south of the Netherlands, but did not achieve the expected results and withdrew. In the following years he again invaded the southern Netherlands, and on 23 January 1581 the Treaty of Plessis-les-Tours was ratified between Anjou and the States General to agree to his reign in the region. His intervention in the Netherlands ended in 1583 after several defeats of his forces.); Kingdom of Portugal (from 1641) (Note: After the outbreak of the Portuguese rebellion in 1640, on 12 June 1641, to the detriment of Spain, a truce and alliance agreement was reached between the Dutch Republic and Portugal with the Treaty of The Hague. But this agreement was only limited to Europe, thus continuing the struggle between the Dutch and Portuguese in the colonies.); Huguenots; Various Protestant German States Native overseas allies (from the 1600s); Kingdom of Ndongo; Kingdom of Matamba; Kingdom of Kongo; Johor Sultanate; Kingdom of Kandy; Anti-Habsburg alliance prior to 1635 (Note: States that fought against the emperor at some point between 1618 and 1635.): (Kingdom of Bohemia) Bohemia; (Swedish Empire) Sweden; Palatinate; (Duchy of Savoy) Savoy; Transylvania; Dutch Republic; Denmark–Norway; Heilbronn League; Hesse-Kassel; Brandenburg-Prussia; Saxony; Post-1635 Peace of Prague: France; (Swedish Empire) Sweden; Dutch Republic; Hesse-Kassel	The Peace of Münster and the Peace of Westphalia: Spain recognises Dutch independence; France annexes the Décapole, and Sundgau; Sweden gains Wismar, Wollin, Western Pomerania, and Bremen-Verden; Brandenburg-Prussia obtains Eastern Pomerania
Castilian War (1578): Part of Ottoman-Habsburg Wars on Southeast Asia and Spanish-Moro Wars	Spanish Empire: (Spain) Philippines; Indian auxiliaries from Mexico and Peru; Bruneians who defected to Spain	Bruneian Empire Sultanate of Sulu Maguindanao Supported by: Ottoman Empire: Turks, Egyptians, Swahilis, Somalis, Sindhis, Gujaratis, and Malabars forces; (Aceh Sultanate) Sultanate of Aceh	Status quo ante bellum: Bruneian military victory to seize its independence from Spanish Empire. Becoming a city-state until today.; Spanish tactical Victory in ending Bruneian empire at sea and its influence on Philippines
Expedition of Juan Jufré and Juan Fernández to Polynesia and New Zealand (1575–1576)	Spanish Empire: Viceroyalty of Peru; Chile	Hostile indigenous people of Polynesia	Stalemate: The expedition possibly reached New Zealand and Tahiti, but there wasn't any conquest.
Expeditions to Chile hostile to Spain (1578–1741)	Viceroyalty of Peru: Chile	European Pirates Supported by: United Provinces; England	Stalemate: Mostly repressed
Anglo-Spanish War (1585–1604): Drake and Hawking expeditions; Thomas Cavendish's circumnavigation	Spanish Empire: (Spain) Spanish Netherlands; Crown of Castile; New Spain; Peru; Crown of Portugal (1580–1640); State of Brazil; Crown of Aragon; Kingdom of Sicily; Kingdom of Naples; Kingdom of Sardinia; Duchy of Parma Grand Duchy of Tuscany Duchy of Savoy Duchy of Castro (Sovereign Military Order of Malta) Order of Saint John co-belligerent: French rebels; Irish rebels	Kingdom of England: Corsairs; (Kingdom of Ireland) Ireland co-belligerent: (Portugal) Portuguese rebels; United Provinces; (Kingdom of France) France; Huguenots	Indecisive, Status quo ante bellum: Near Lima, Drake captured a Spanish ship with 25,000 pesos of Peruvian gold.; Expulsion of the English from Spanish America and end of English interruption to Spanish transatlantic transportation and colonial expansion.; The English privateers now find their needs in the service of the Dutch.; England obtains the Colony of Newfoundland and Bermuda, beginning the English colonial Empire.; Treaty of London
Antarctic Expedition of the Armada del Mar del Sur to the South Seas and Terra Australis (1603)	(Spain) Viceroyalty of Peru: (Spain) Chile	(Dutch Republic) Dutch corsair	Inconclusive: First western sightings of Antarctica; Peruvian presence on Antarctica.
Spanish campaigns in Lanao (1637–1639): Spanish occupation of Jolo	Spanish Empire: New Spain; (Spain) Philippines; (Spain) Peru; (Spain) Panama; Supported by: Republic of Genoa	Confederate States of Lanao Supported by: (Dutch Republic) Dutch Empire	Stalemate: Failure of the conquest and Christianize the Maranao people; Truce is reached to stop Muslim raids against Zamboanga and Chavacano people. Fort Pilar is seizured.
Battle of Mbororé (1641): part of Portuguese Restoration War and Portuguese conquest of the Eastern Missions	Viceroyalty of Peru: Paraguay; Governorate of Rio de la Plata; Jesuit missions among the Guaraní; Indian auxiliaries	Colonial Brazil: Bandeirantes Paulistas; Tupi people	Victory: Portuguese raids stop; Guarani people are excluded from forced labour; The jesuits gain more autonomy regarding the administration of their missions
2nd Communero Rebellion of Paraguay (1649–1650)	Viceroyalty of Peru: Governorate of Paraguay (loyal to Sebastián de León y Zárate); Jesuit Province of Paraguay; Indian auxiliaries (Guaraní)	Governorate of Paraguay (loyal to Bernardino de Cárdenas): Cabildo of Asunción; Mestizo and Criollos Encomenderos rebels (comuneros)	Royalist victory: An army of 700 Indian missionaries, led by León and Zárate, occupy Asunción and imprison Cárdenas. He is then exiled from Paraguay and sent to Charcas in Upper Peru for a Trial of residence for his actions without royal permission.; The institutions and properties, illegitimately usurped from the Jesuits and indigenous people, are returned to them by order of the King's Representative.
Mapuche uprising of 1655 (1655)	Viceroyalty of Peru: Chile; Indian auxiliaries	Mapuches: Cuncos; Pehuenches	Defeat: The lands between the Bío Bío and Maule rivers are economically devastated and the Spanish abandon Boroa.; The looting raids, led by Mestizo Alejo and other indigenous leaders, continue.; Large number of freed Mapuche slaves.; The Governor of Chile, Francisco Antonio de Acuña Cabrera y Bayona, is deposed twice and there is the possibility of civil war.
Chepo expedition (1679)	New Spain: Captaincy General of Guatemala; Viceroyalty of Peru: New Granada; Chile	European Pirates (English and Spaniards renegades)	Initial victory for the pirates: They continue their actions on both coasts of Central America, while looting and then burning of the town of Chepo, Panama (part of Peru as Real Audiencia of Panama).; Peruvian royal victory in Battle of San Marcos de Arica: Execution of the pirates, with the exception of Bartolomé Sharp, who manages to return to England and is acquitted.
Luso-Brazilian raids against the Maynas government (1680–XVIII Century)	Viceroyalty of Peru: Jesuit missions in the Amazonia; Indian auxiliaries (Omaguas, Ansuares, Yurimaguas, Aisuaris)	Colonial Brazil: Bandeirantes; Tupi people	Military stalemate: The Peruvians, Spanish and auxiliary Indians are expelled from the Pará River, the Negro River and the Juruá-Mirim River. The Brazilians and Portuguese are expelled from the Napo River, the Aguarico River, the Marañón River and the Ucayali River.; Brazilian political victory: The borders of the Treaty of Tordesillas (at the mouth of the Pará River) are discontinued in favor of those established in the Treaty of San Ildefonso of 1777 (at the confluence of the Caquetá River and the Amazon River), with Peru losing 200 leagues of territory occupied in the East by the Jesuit missions of Father Samuel Fritz.
Colonial front of Nine Years' War (1688–97): Raid on Cartagena de Indias (1697)	Grand Alliance: Dutch Republic; England; New England; Holy Roman Empire; Spain; (Spain) Spanish Netherlands; (Spain) Viceroyalty of Peru; (Spain) New Granada; Piedmont-Savoy; Sweden (until 1691); Scotland	France: New France; Wabanaki Confederacy Irish and Scottish Jacobites	Indecisive: French victory in his raid on South America.; Treaty of Ryswick; Spain officially ceded the western third of Hispaniola to France, establishing the Saint-Domingue colony on modern Haiti.
West Indies and South American Front of the War of the Spanish Succession (1701–14): Siege of Colonia del Sacramento; Wager's Action; Capture of the galleon San Joaquin	Kingdom of France: New France; (Kingdom of France) French East India Company; Spain loyal to Philip: Crown of Castile; Kingdom of Naples; Kingdom of Sicily; New Spain; (Spain) Peru (Provinces of the Peruvian coast); Bavaria (until 1704) Duchy of Mantua (until 1708) Cologne (until 1702) Liège (until 1702) co-belligerent: Kuruc (Kingdom of Hungary); Principality of Transylvania	Holy Roman Empire: Austria; Prussia (from 1702); Hanover; Great Britain (formed in 1707): England (until 1707); Scotland (until 1707); British America; British East India Company; Dutch Republic Duchy of Savoy (after 1703) Kingdom of Portugal (from 1703): State of Brazil; Spain loyal to Charles: Crown of Aragon; (Spain) Spanish Netherlands; Provinces of the Andean-Amazonian interior of Peru; (Denmark) Danish Auxiliary Corps co-belligerent: Hungarian Royalists; Kingdom of Croatia	Political victory for Spain loyal to Philip Military victory for Spain loyal to Charles: Treaty of Utrecht (1713); Treaty of Rastatt (1714); Treaty of Baden (1714); Spain and Britain sign the Asiento; Spain cedes the Colony of Sacramento to the Portuguese Empire
Protests and rebellions of the 18th century in the Viceroyalty of Peru (1700s)	(Spain) Viceroyalty of Peru	Rebellions of peruleros	Pyric victory of the Viceroyalty authorities.: Partial reforms are given to appease the rebels, as well as severe punishments for repeat offender leaders, to prevent future insurrections among the local population.; Multiple social groups, dissatisfied with the Bourbon Reforms, would continue to rebel under the motto of "Long live the King, death to the bad government" for an improvement of the Spanish state in its compliance with the colonial pact between subject and monarch, longing for the previous "fueros" and local autonomies of the traditional Monarchy of the House of Austria against the thriving Bourbon Absolutism.; First notions of anti-colonial political independence in the most radical groups, usually influenced by the Spanish-American Enlightenment.
Huilliche uprising of 1712 (1712)	(Spain) Viceroyalty of Peru: (Spain) Chile; (Spain) Governorate of Chiloé	Huilliches of Chiloé	Royalist Victory: Harsh reprisals by the Spanish military against the Huiliches until the intervention of the Jesuit mediation.; The governor of Chile, Juan Andrés de Ustáriz, created a commission (led by Pedro de Molina) to find those responsible and punish corrupt officials who provoked the Huiliche rebellion. Marín de Velasco is found guilty and is prohibited from returning to Chiloé, Ustáriz is dismissed after the Trial of residence for complicity with Garzón's escape; Reforms are being made so that living conditions in the encomienda improve for the Huilliches
Great Revolt of the Comuneros of Paraguay (1721–1735)	(Spain) Viceroyalty of Peru: (Spain) Paraguay; (Spain) Rio de la Plata; Jesuit missions among the Guaraní	Comuneros Encomenderos	Royalist victory: Execution of José de Antequera y Castro in the Ciudad de los Reyes (Lima).; Bruno Mauricio de Zabala ordered extreme measures against the Paraguayan province.; Anti-Peruvian resentments in Paraguay.
Mapuche uprising of 1723 (1723)	(Spain) Viceroyalty of Peru: (Spain) Chile	Mapuches: Lafquenches; Cuncos	Both sides claim victory: A peace agreement was reached with the Parliament of Negrete, where they established a system of fairs where Mapuche-Spanish trade was regulated through 3-4 fairs per year, breaking the Spanish commercial monopoly in Araucanía.
Spanish–Portuguese War (1735–1737)	(Spain) Spanish Empire: (Spain) Viceroyalty of Peru; (Spain) Rio de la Plata	(Portugal) Portuguese Empire: State of Brazil	Defeat and Status quo ante bellum: Miguel de Salcedo was disposed as governor of Buenos Aires; Colonia del Sacramento under Portuguese sovereignty. Montevideo under Spanish sovereignty
Colonial front of the War of Austrian Succession (War of Jenkins' Ear) (1739–48): George Anson's voyage around the world	Spanish Empire: New Spain; (Spain) Cuba; (Spain) Florida; (Spain) New Granada; (Spain) Venezuela Province; (Spain) Peru; France: New France; Wabanaki Confederacy Prussia Bavaria (1741–45) Saxony (1741–42) (Kingdom of the Two Sicilies) Sicily and Naples Republic of Genoa (1745–48) Sweden (1741–43) Savoy-Sardinia (1741–42)	Great Britain: British America; Iroquois Confederacy Habsburg Monarchy (Province of Hanover) Hanover Dutch Republic Saxony (1743–45) Savoy-Sardinia (1742–48) Russia (1741–43, 1748)	Status quo ante bellum: Treaty of Aix-la-Chapelle (1748) leading to Treaty of Madrid (1750); Spain revalidated with Great Britain the right of Asiento de Negros and permission for this country to send one merchant ship a year to the Spanish colonies in America. Both points had been previously agreed on March 16, 1713, in the Treaty of Utrecht.; George Anson's English troops razed the city and devastated Paita, burning it in 1742.
Juan Santos Rebellion (1742–52)	(Spain) Viceroyalty of Peru: Franciscan missionaries	Juan Santos Atahualpa led indigenous rebels	Defeat: Asháninka, Yaneshas, Shipibos, Piros, and Quechuas gain freedom from Spanish control; Spanish lose control of Yungas and central Peru region
Guaraní War (1754–56)	(Spain) Spanish Empire: (Spain) Viceroyalty of Peru; (Spain) Paraguay; (Portugal) Portuguese Empire: State of Brazil	Guaraní Tribes Jesuits: Jesuit missions among the Guaraní	Victory: Ratification of Treaty of Madrid (13 January 1750).; Treaty of El Pardo: Declaration of the border between Spain and Portugal in South America; Total abandonment of the Misiones Orientales by the Guaraní, being ceded to Portuguese Brazil.; Subsequent Expulsion of the Jesuits from Portugal in 1759 and then of the Expulsion of the Jesuits from Spanish Empire of 1767.
Colonial front of the Seven Years' War: South American Front of Anglo-Spanish War (1762–1763); Mojeña War; Fantastic War; First expedition of Cevallos to Río Grande; Anglo-Portuguese invasion of the Río de la Plata (1763)	Spain (since 1762): (Spain) Peru; (Spain) New Granada; New Spain; France: New France; Wabanaki Confederacy; Austria Saxony; Hesse-Darmstadt Sweden; Russia (until 1762) Kalmykia; Mughal Empire (since 1757)	(Portugal) Portuguese Empire (since 1762): State of Brazil; Great Britain: British America; Iroquois Confederacy; Hanover Prussia; Hesse-Kassel Brunswick-Wolfenbüttel; Schaumburg-Lippe	Stalemate: Transfer of colonial possessions between Great Britain, France, and Spain after Treaty of Paris (1763).; Spanish victory on River Plate. In present-day Uruguay, Spanish captured Colónia do Sacramento and advanced into Rio Grande do Sul.; The thesis of the Portuguese Empire prevailed that the Guaporé river should serve as a border between the two Empires in the Amazon Jungle on present-day Bolivia.; The Portuguese conquered most of the valley of Rio Negro, expelling the Spaniards from São Gabriel and São José de Maribatanas.
Mapuche uprising of 1766 (1766)	(Spain) Viceroyalty of Peru: (Spain) Chile; Pehuenche	Mapuches	Stagnation due to inter-ethnic indigenous conflict: Spanish penetration in Araucanía is reversed.
Spanish expeditions to Tahití (1772–1775)	(Spain) Spanish Empire: (Spain) Peru; Christianized Tahitians	Hostile Pagan Tahitians Spanish and Peruvian mutineers	Victory: Withdrawn due to anticlerical policies of Charles III and economic problems in Peru to support the stability of the Catholic missions
Rebellion of Túpac Amaru II (1780–1783): Includes Oruro Rebellion	(Spain) Viceroyalty of Peru: Council of 24 Incan Noble electors; (Spain) Viceroyalty of the Río de la Plata: (Spain) Charcas	Túpac Amaru II criollo, mestizo, indigenous and black rebel forces Túpac Katari indigenous rebel forces	Royalist victory: Rebellion repressed.; Death of Túpac Amaru II and his family.; Attempt to ban Inca Culture and Quechua.; Reforms in the viceroyalty (abolition of the Corregimientos and installation of the Intendencies)
Huilliche uprising of 1792 (1792)	(Spain) Viceroyalty of Peru: (Spain) Chile; (Spain) Governorate of Valdivia; (Spain) Chiloé	Huilliches of Futahuillimapu	Royalist victory: After the misunderstandings were resolved, the Parliament of Las Canoas was signed by Governor Ambrosio O'Higgins, by which the Huiliches were fully incorporated into the sovereignty of the Spanish Crown, while maintaining their traditional institutions (such as the cacicato). Therefore, the territorial strip between the Rahue and Damas rivers is open to Spanish colonization, allowing the refoundation of Osorno. The indigenous signatories recognized the king of Spain as their sovereign and signed an alliance agreement, but maintained considerable autonomy in the lands that they had not ceded to the Kingdom of Chile.
Campaigns of the Royal Army of Peru during Spanish American wars of independence (1808–1833): Bolivian War of Independence; Goyeneche campaign in Upper Peru (1809); Ecuadorian War of Independence; Quito revolutionary process (1809-1812); Guayaquil War of Independence; Argentine War of Independence; Córdoba Counterrevolution; Auxiliary Expeditions to Upper Peru; Gaucho war; De la Serna's invasion of Jujuy and Salta; Corsairs in Argentine Independence; Brown's corsair expedition to the Pacific; Hippolytus Bouchard Expedition; Chilean War of Independence; Patria Vieja Campaign; Reconquest of Chile; Campaign of the Chilean corsairs; Colombian War of Independence; Nariño campaign in the south; Southern Campaigns; Pasto Campaign; Sucre Campaign in Upper Peru; Peruvian War of Independence; Tacna Insurrection (1811); Tacna Rebellion of 1813; Cusco Rebellion of 1814; Maynas War of Independence	(Spain) Spanish Empire: (Spain) Viceroyalty of Peru; (Spain) Viceroyalty of New Granada (until 1822); (Spain) Viceroyalty of the Río de la Plata (until 1814); Unofficially supported by: (Portugal) Kingdom of Brazil	1st phase Junta of Quito; Bolivian Republiquetas Junta of Chile; Junta of Bogota; Junta of Buenos Aires: Junta of Cusco; Junta of Tacna; Junta of Guayaquil 2nd phase Río de la Plata; Chile; Gran Colombia; Peru Supported by: Britain; Haiti	1st phase: Initial Royalist victory during the administration of the viceroy José Fernando de Abascal y Sousa: Liberal Revolutions repressed effectively in Peru, being the only territory without developing a Junta during Peninsular War.; Viceroyalty of Peru reconquers for the Spanish Supreme Central Junta, and annex to Lima authorities, the territories Upper Peru and Real Audiencia of Quito in 1810, after helping counter-revolutionary forces against the considered illegal Juntas of Spanish American.; Peruvian royalists in land reconquers totality of Chile after Battle of Rancagua. Also making incursions into Argentine Northwest and Southern Colombia. Even reaching some help of luso-Brazilian royalists caudillos from the Captaincy of Grão Pará and Captaincy of Matto Grosso.; Peruvian royalists in sea maintain the balance of powers in favor of Lima and Spain against Valparaiso and the secessionists throughout the Pacific Ocean, protecting royalists navigation routes with Central America and Mexico (giving some aid to royalists from there against Argentine and Chilean corsairs).; Militar victory against Don Jose de San Martin intervention during Battle of Moquegua.; 2nd phase: Reverse during Joaquín de la Pezuela administration and final defeat during Jose de la Serna government.: Dissolution of the Peruvian Royal Army after Olañeta Rebellion civil war between liberal and absolutist royalists. Then defeated by Gran Colombia forces.; Royalist guerrillas remnants in Peru by the Republic of Iquicha until 1836. Also by other remnants of the royal Peruvian army, such as the Pincheira Brothers in southern Chile until 1834, and by the Fernando VII Regiment in Vallegrande (Bolivia) until 1828.

== Republic of Peru (1821–present) ==
Conflict	Peru and allies	Opponents	Results
Peruvian War of Independence (1811–1826)	Peru; Chile; Colombia; Río de la Plata	Spain	Peruvian victory: Peru becomes an independent country; Maynas is part of Peru
Ecuadorian War of Independence (1820–1822): Quito campaign	Guayaquil; Colombia; Chile; Peru; Río de la Plata	Spain	Victory: Incorporation of the Real Audiencia of Quito into Gran Colombia
Bolivian War of Independence (1821–1825)	Bolivia: Republiquetas; ColombiaPeru; Río de la Plata	Spain	Peruvian ictory: Secession of Upper Peru and foundation of the Republic of Bolívar.
Iquicha War (1825–1828)	Peru	Iquicha	Government victory
Peruvian intervention in Bolivia (1828)	Peru: Republic of Upper Peru	Colombia: Bolivia	Victory: Treaty of Piquiza; Withdrawal of Gran Colombian troops from Bolivia. End of Bolivarian influence in Bolivia.
Gran Colombia–Peru War (1828–1829)	Peru	Colombia	Stalemate: Signing of the Larrea-Gual Treaty; Peru recognises the Colombian annexation of Guayaquil; Colombia recognises Peruvian sovereignty of Tumbes, Jaen and Maynas
Peruvian Civil War (1834)	Government of Luis José de Orbegoso	Revolutionaries under Pedro Bermudez	Government victory
Salaverry-Santa Cruz War (1835–1836)	Peru Government of Felipe Santiago Salaverry Agustín Gamarra's Rebels	Peru Oppposition under Luis José de Orbegoso; Bolivian Army of Andrés de Santa Cruz	Defeat: Establishment of the Peru–Bolivian Confederation; Consolidation of Peruvian nationalism by Salaverristas Forces after the Lima pogrom in 1835
War of the Confederation (1836–1839)	Peru-Bolivian Confederation: Iquicha; Supported by: (Chile) Pipiolos	Chile (Peru) Peruvian Dissidents	Restoration victory: Dissolution of the Confederation; Exile of Santa Cruz
War between Argentina and Peru–Bolivian Confederation (1837–1839): 4th Argentine Civil War	Peru-Bolivian Confederation: Jujuy Rebels; Supported by: Unitarians; Colorados	Argentina	Defeat: Dissolution of the Confederation
Iquicha War (1839)	Peru; Chile	Iquicha	Peruvian-Chilean victory: Signature of the Treaty of Yanallay in which the Iquichans submit to the Republic of Peru; Isolation of the caudillo Antonio Huachaca
Peruvian-Bolivian War of 1841-1842 (1841–1842)	Peru	Bolivia	Ceasefire: Treaty of Puno; Bolivian expulsion from southern Peru; Peruvian Army expelled from Bolivia; Bolivian Army expelled from Peru
Peruvian Civil War of 1843–1844 (1843–1844)	(Peru) Manuel Ignacio de Vivanco's Government	(Peru) Ramón Castilla's Rebels	Defeat
Peruvian raid on Bolivia (1847)	Peruvian Army	Bolivian civilians	Peruvian victory
Peruvian expedition to California (1849)	Peru: Peruvian Navy United States local authorities	Violent bandits of the Wild west	Peruvian victory: Peruvian ship "BAP Gamarra" successfully defended Peruvians and other Hispanics against xenophobic violence in California, while also helping American authorities to establish order during the California gold rush. Then repatriated Peruvians after receiving more violence of bandits amidst disinterest of American government to integrate Hispanics in the region.
Raid on Pacajes (1850)	Peru	Bolivia	Peruvian victory: Peru captures Pacajes and incorporated into Peruvian territory
Raid on the Desagüadero River (1850)	Peruvian Army	Bolivia	Peruvian victory: Incorporation of the Desagüadero River to Peru
Liberal Revolution of 1854 (1854)	(Peru) Constitutional Army	(Peru) Liberal Army	Constitutional Army defeat
Peruvian Civil War of 1856–1858 (1856–1858)	(Peru) Ramón Castilla's Government	(Peru) Manuel Ignacio de Vivanco's Rebels	Government victory: Abolition of Slavery in Peru.
Ecuadorian–Peruvian War of 1857–1860 (1857–1860)	Peru	Ecuador	Peruvian victory: Subscription of the Treaty of Mapasingue Diplomatic impasse arising from Ecuador's decision to grant its English creditors the vast Amazonian territories disputed with Peru. Ecuadorian failure.
Peruvian raids in Polynesia (1859–1863)	Peru	Polynesians: Rapa Nui people; Tokelauan people; Micronesians	Peruvian victory: Peruvian raiders, after a lot of skirmishes on Oceania (from Gilbert Islands to Rapa nui), enslave 1500 to 3000 indigenous peoples of Polynesia (mostly Rapa Nui), but most of those "canaca" died during or shortly after to its arrival in Peruvian Haciendas.; Peruvian Government is forced (by pressure from French Polynesia, United Kingdom and Catholic Church authorities) to return the rest of Polynesians to their homes.; Demographic and Cultural Catastrophy on Easter Island due to Pandemic of Virulence and death of Ariki class (includying the King of Easter Island).
Peruvian Civil War of 1865 (1865)	(Peru) Juan Antonio Pezet's Government	(Peru) Mariano Ignacio Prado's Rebels	Defeat
Chincha Islands War (1865–1866)	Chile; Peru; Ecuador; Bolivia	Spain	Indecisive, both sides claimed victory: The state of war is maintained between the belligerent parties until the signing of an indefinite armistice in 1871.; Subsequently, Spain and the South American allies signed peace treaties separately: Peru (1879), Bolivia (1879), Chile (1883) and Ecuador (1885).
Peruvian Civil War of 1867 (1867)	(Peru) Mariano Ignacio Prado's Government	(Peru) Pedro Diez Canseco and José Balta's Rebels	Defeat
Puno Rebellion (1868–1869)	Peru	Tupac Amaru III indigenous rebel forces	Government victory
Chinese workers' revolts (1870–1884)	Peru	(Qing dynasty) Chinese Peruvians Supported by: Chile (1881-1883)	Pirric victory: Liberation of the Chinese from semi-slavery conditions on the Haciendas and Latifundios.; Most bloodiest anti-Chinese pogroms by Peruvian Army until 1950 with 40,000 Chinese massacred
Huáscar Uprising of 1877 (1877)	Peru	(Peru) Huáscar Rebels	Government victory
Battle of Pacocha (1877)	Peru	Britain	Peruvian victory
War of the Pacific (1879–1883)	Bolivia; Peru	Chile	Peruvian defeat: Chilean forces capture Lima; Chilean forces occupy Tacna, Arica and Tarapaca; Tacna reincorporated to Peru in 1929; Bolivia loses its access to the sea
Peruvian Civil War of 1884–1885 (1884–1885)	(Peru) Andrés Avelino Cáceres's Rebels	(Peru) Miguel Iglesias's Government	Cacerista victory: Continue the represions against Chinese coolies workers; Start the National Reconstruction
Huaraz Rebellion (1885–1887)	Peru	(Peru) Quechua Rebels	Government victory
Peruvian-Bolivian incident (1890)	Peru	Bolivian-Peruvians and Bolivians	Peruvian victory: Desturction of the Defensive alliance with Bolivia; 5,000 Bolivians were deported and 2,000 are killed by Peruvian Army with Quechuans and Turks volunteers
Peruvian Civil War of 1894–1895 (1894–1895)	(Peru) Andrés Avelino Cáceres's Government	(Peru) Nicolás de Piérola's Rebels	Defeat
Loretan Insurrection of 1896 (1896)	Peru	Federal State of Loreto	Government victory
Salt Revolt (1896–1897)	Peru	(Peru) Quechua Rebels	Government victory
Peruvian—Brazilian border skirmishes (1902–1909)	Peru co-belligerant Bolivia (until 1903)	Brazil Supported by: Ecuador; Chile	Stalemate: Initial Peruvian victories on their military incursions on Alto Yurúa and Alto Purús region until the intervention of Jose Ferreira forces in 1904.; Brazil sough an anti-Peruvian alliance with Ecuador (Tobar-Rio Branco treaty) and Chile.; After Brazilian intimidations to Peruvian authorities of a total war with all of its neighbours, it has firmed the Velarde-Rio Branco Treaty, favorable to Brazil.; Peruvian withdrawal of their Acre pretensions, but ending Brazilian expansionism into Madre de Dios and Ucayali.
Angoteros Incident (1903)	Peru	Ecuador	Peruvian victory: Advance of an Ecuadorian detachment in Peruvian territory that was repelled on the banks of the Napo River
Torres Causana Incident (1904)	Peru	Ecuador	Peruvian victory: Advance of Ecuadorian troops in Peruvian territory in the area of the Aguarico river and Napo river until their subsequent expulsion, taking of prisoners and captured war material.
Peruvian-Ecuadorian tension of 1910 (1910)	Peru	Ecuador Supported by: Chile	Stalemate: ABC countries and United States intervenes to garantice the peace after menace of continental war.; For the first time in world history, the provisions of the 1907 Hague Convention, regarding the peaceful settlement of conflicts, were fulfilled.; Peruvian position is favoured
Manuripi campaign (1910)	Peru	Bolivia Supported by: Chile	Peruvian victory: Recognition of most of the disputed territory as belonging to Peru (250 000 km2 of Peru). Delivery of the territory of Purus to Peruvian territory. Death of the Bolivian captain Lino Echevarria.
Conflict of La Pedrera (1911)	Peru	Colombia	Peruvian victory: Colombian troops were evicted from the Pedrera
Trujillan Revolution (1932)	Peru	APRA Supported by: Soviet Union; Chile	Government victory: Massacres, bombing of Trujillo and failure of the revolution
Colombia–Peru War (1932–1933)	Peru	Colombia	Ceasefire: Status quo ante bellum; Ratification of the Solomon-Lozano Treaty
Ecuadorian–Peruvian War of 1941 (1941)	Peru	Ecuador	Peruvian victory: Signing of the Rio de Janeiro Protocol
World War II (1945)	United States; Soviet Union; United Kingdom; China; France; Poland; Canada; Australia; New Zealand; India; South Africa; Yugoslavia; Greece; Denmark; Norway; Netherlands; Belgium; Luxembourg; Czechoslovakia; Brazil; Mexico; Chile; Bolivia; Colombia; Ecuador; Paraguay; Peru; Venezuela; Uruguay; Argentina	Germany; Japan; Italy; Hungary; Romania; Bulgaria; Croatia; Slovakia; Finland; Thailand; Manchukuo; Mengjiang	Victory: Collapse of the German Reich; Fall of Japanese and Italian Empires; Creation of the United Nations; Emergence of the United States and the Soviet Union as superpowers; Beginning of the Cold War
Leftists Guerrilla Insurgencies (1962–1965)	Peru	MIR ELN Cuba	Government victory: Luis de la Puente Uceda is captured and executed.; End of Cuban intervention on Andean countries after the paralleling Che Guevara's failure in Bolivia.
Limazo (1975)	Revolutionary Government of the Armed Forces of Peru	Peruvian police rebels (Peru) Civilians (right-wing and radical left-wing)	Government Victory
Battle of Alto Cenepa (1978)	Peru	Ecuador	Victory: The base and the camp set up by the Ecuadorian troops are now controlled by the Peruvian Army
Internal Conflict in Peru [Main Phase] (1980–2000)	Peru	Shining Path MRTA (1982–1997)	Government victory: Strong weakening of the Shining Path; Shining Path last groups still active on high jungle; Total defeat of the Túpac Amaru Revolutionary Movement (MRTA)
Paquisha War (1981)	Peru	Ecuador	Peruvian victory: The posts installed by Ecuadorian troops came to be controlled by the Peruvian Army; Status quo ante bellum of 1942
Alto Cenepa War (1995)	Peru	Ecuador Supported by: Chile Argentina Israel	Ceasefire: Status quo ante bellum; Acta of Brasilia; The border was closed, as indicated in the Rio de Janeiro Protocol of 1942, and the end of all differences between the two nations was declared
Narcoterrorist insurgency (2000–present): Peru in Colombia Internal Conflict	Peru Colombia	Shining Path: Movimiento por la Amnistía y Derechos Fundamentales (MOVADEF); FUDEPP; Comité Base Mantaro Rojo; Militarized Communist Party of Peru Ethnocacerists Peruvian narcotraficants Colombian narcotraficants FARC	Ongoing
