= Enrique López Albujar Trint =

Peruvian army officer

Enrique López Albujar Trint (1930-1990) was a Peruvian army officer. He served as defense minister under Alan García, between 1987 and 1989. He was killed by MRTA in 1990.
