= Daniel Mora =

Peruvian military officer and politician

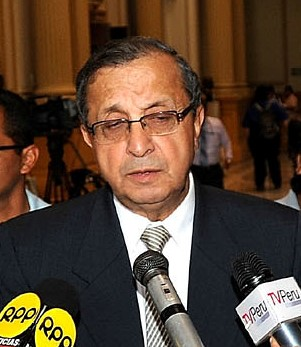

Minister of Defense
- In office 28 July 2011 – 10 December 2011
- President: Ollanta Humala
- Prime Minister: Salomon Lerner
- Preceded by: Jaime Thorne León
- Succeeded by: Luis Alberto Otárola

Member of Congress
- In office 26 July 2011 – 26 July 2016
- Constituency: Callao

Personal details
- Born: Daniel Emiliano Mora Zevallos; 18 February 1945 (age 81) Callao, Peru
- Party: Union for Peru (2020); Purple Party 2016–2020)
- Other political affiliations: Possible Peru (until 2016)
- Education: Chorrillos Military School; University of Lima
- Profession: Soldier

Daniel Emiliano Mora Zevallos (born 18 February 1945) is a Peruvian military officer and politician belonging to the Possible Peru. He was the first Minister of Defense in Ollanta Humala's government and a Congressman, representing the Constitutional Province of Callao for the 2011–2016 term.

== Education and career ==
From 1963 to 1967, Daniel Mora attended the Chorrillos Military School, specialising in engineering. He took post-gradual courses at the École d'application du génie (French school of military engineering) in Angers, from 1972 to 1973. Additionally, he studied education administration at the University of Lima in 1985/86, and international humanitarian law in armed conflicts at the International Institute of Humanitarian Law in San Remo, Italy, in 1998.

From 1976 to 1980, Daniel Mora was a professor at the Political Academy of Chile. At the end of the Cenepa War between Peru and Ecuador in 1995, Mora was the Peruvian negotiator for the treaty of Itamaraty.

== Political career ==
=== Early political career ===
Daniel Mora was a founding member of the Possible Peru party of former president Alejandro Toledo in 2000. In the 2000 general elections, he unsuccessfully ran for Congress for the We Are Peru party of then Lima Mayor Alberto Andrade. Since his adhesion, he has held different executive positions in the party organisation. In Toledo's administration, Mora was secretary-general in the Ministry of Transport and Communication from 2002 to 2003, head of the advisory staff of the same ministry, and chairman of the National Intelligence Council (CNI), from 2003 to 2004. From 2005 to 2006 he was a presidential counsellor in the Peruvian Government Palace, assigned to decentralization. In the 2006 general elections, Mora ran for a seat in Congress, representing Callao under the Possible Peru party, but he was not elected.

=== Congressman ===
In the 2011 general election, Daniel Mora was elected to the Congress on the Possible Peru Alliance list to represent the Constitutional Province of Callao. On 28 July 2011, newly elected president Ollanta Humala appointed him as Minister of Defense, due to a coalition agreement between Possible Peru and Humala's Peru Wins movement. He resigned when the cabinet was reshuffled on 11 December 2011.

During his congressional term, he distanced himself from Possible Peru.

In August 2013, when he was president of the Education Commission of the Congress of the Republic, he gave the forum "The university in the 21st century, new university law and its autonomy" at the Jorge Basadre Grohmann National University, where he proposed the University Law 30220, of which he was the greatest promoter. This law gave the modern University Reform in Peru and also created the controversial National Superintendence of Higher University Education (SUNEDU).

=== Post-congressional career ===
In 2016, he was presented as a founding member of the Purple Party led by Julio Guzmán.

In September 2020, he joined the Patriotic Front of jailed rebel leader Antauro Humala that is affiliated with the Union for Peru. He later left the Patriotic Front in aftermath of the removal of Martín Vizcarra.

== Controversies ==
On 16 January 2020, during Mora's candidacy as the Purple Party candidate for the 2020 extraordinary elections, a complaint of family violence was made public by his then-still wife Lilia Jaureguy. Mora expressed that it was only a "domestic discussion", in addition that he would resign his candidacy and the party. The National Elections Jury denied him that option because the resignation date had already expired. The event became quite relevant because it occurred in a period of intense violence against women and a high rate of feminicides in the country.

== See also ==
- Purple Party
- University reform
