= Walter Astudillo =

Peruvian military general

Major general Walter Astudillo
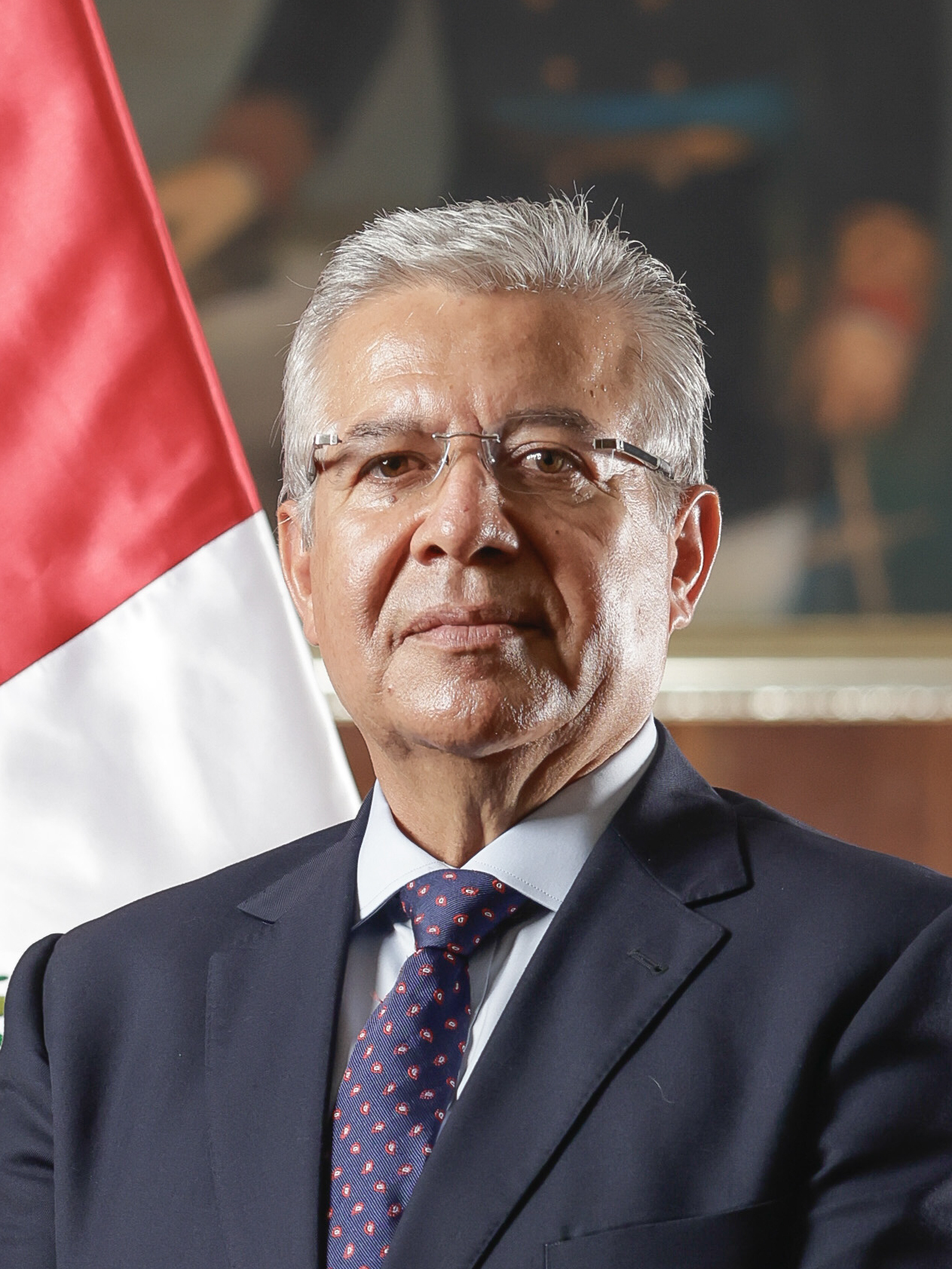
- Official portrait, 2024

Minister of Defence
- In office 13 February 2024 – 10 October 2025
- President: Dina Boluarte
- Prime Minister: Alberto Otárola; Gustavo Adrianzén; Eduardo Arana
- Preceded by: Jorge Chávez Cresta
- Succeeded by: César Díaz Peche

Personal details
- Born: 5 September 1961 (age 64) Nepeña District, Peru
- Education: Chorrillos Military School
- Occupation: Military General

Military service
- Allegiance: Peru
- Branch/service: Peruvian Army
- Years of service: Until 2020
- Rank: Major General

Walter Enrique Astudillo Chávez (born 5 September 1961) is a Peruvian retired military general who served as Minister of Defence from 2024 to 2025.

== Early life and education ==
Walter Enrique Astudillo Chávez was born in San Jacinto. He graduated from the Chorrillos Military School in January 1983.

== Career ==
=== Military ===
Astudillo was promoted to Brigadier General in 2011, and then Major General in 2017 before retiring from the army in January 2020.

=== Minister of Defence ===
Astudillo was appointed Minister of Defence on 13 February 2024.
