= INDECOPI =

Government agency in Peru

Indecopi
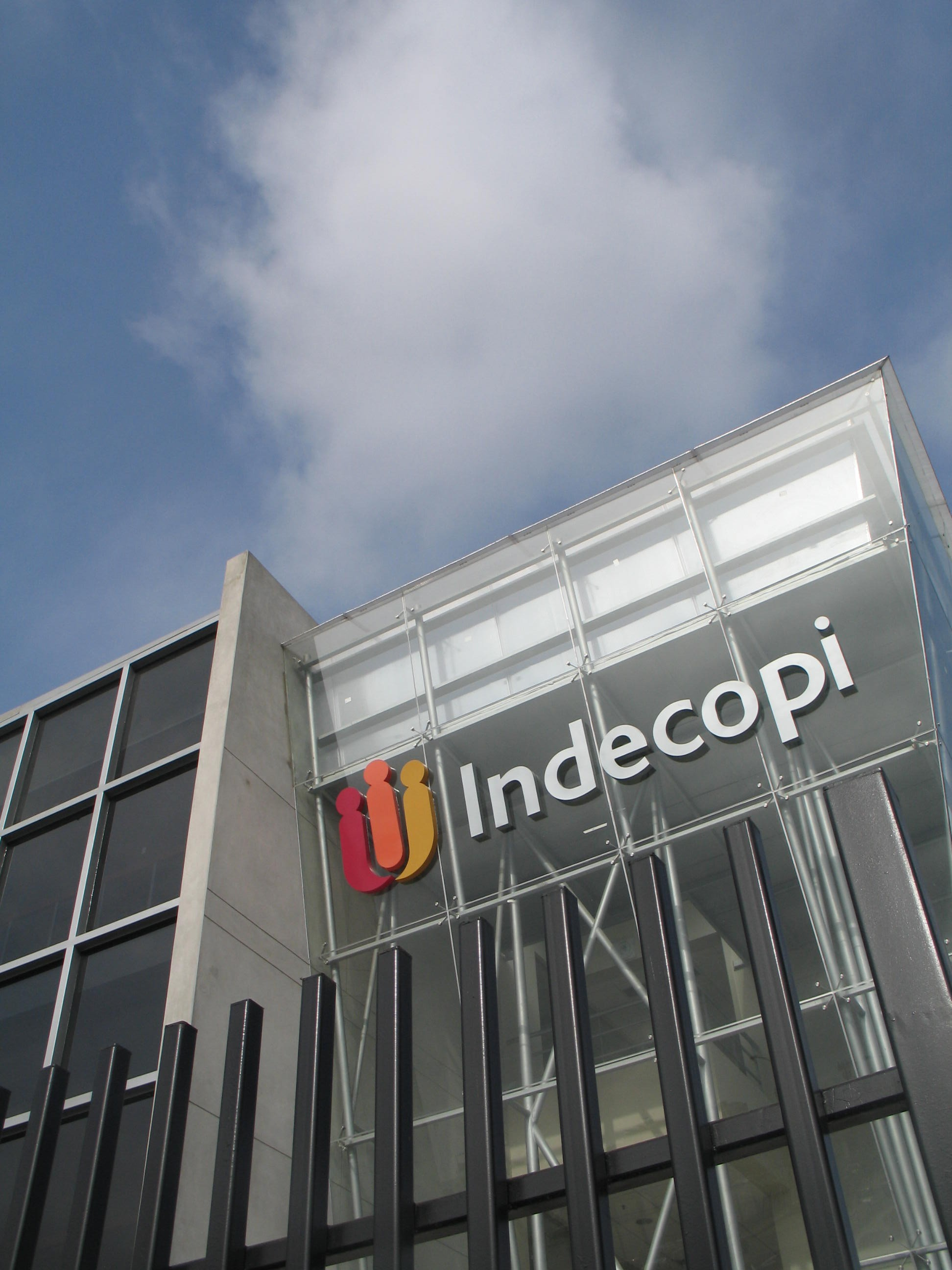

Agency overview
- Formed: November 24, 1992; 33 years ago
- Jurisdiction: Peru
- Headquarters: Calle de la Prosa 104
- Agency executive: Alberto Villanueva Eslava, President of the Board of Directors
- Parent organisation: Presidency of the Council of Ministers
- Website: www.gob.pe/indecopi

The National Institute for the Defence of Competition and the Protection of Intellectual Property (Spanish: Instituto Nacional de Defensa de la Competencia y de la Protección de la Propiedad Intelectual, INDECOPI) is a specialised autonomous public body of the Peruvian State, currently attached to the Presidency of the Council of Ministers, with legal status under public law. It was created on November 24, 1992, by Decree Law No. 25868.

== History ==
Indecopi was created by Decree Law No. 25868 in the government of Alberto Fujimori as part of the economic reforms for the private sector. Initially the institution was attached to the Ministry of Industry, Tourism, Integration and International Trade Negotiations (MITINCI), but in 2005 it became an autonomous entity and was assigned to the Presidency of the Council of Ministers.

In terms of competition law, which monitors the economic activities of companies in the country, Indecopi voluntarily participates as a national authority in the International Competition Network (ICN). In October 2021, the entity received the Competition Defense Award of that year awarded by the ICN, for the preparation of the "Report on the medicinal oxygen market", during the COVID-19 pandemic in Peru, where carried out an analysis of the acquisition of this element in the country for the Peruvian health system, both public and private.

It also takes care of bureaucratic barriers; In general, the agency determines the requirements that prevent the correct attention of the public administration of the State.

With respect to intellectual property matters, Indecopi represents Peru and works jointly with the World Intellectual Property Organization (WIPO).

== List of presidents ==
- Jorge Muñiz Ziches (1992–1994)
- Beatriz Boza Dibós (1995–2000)
- Carlos Seminario Pizzorni (2000–2002)
- César Augusto Almeyda Tasayco (2002–2003)
- Santiago Francisco Roca Tavella (2004–2006)
- Jaime Thorne León (2006–2010)
- Eduardo Maximiliano Antonio de la Piedra Higueras (2010–2011)
- Hebert Tassano Velaochaga (2011–2016
- Ivo Sergio Gagliuffi Piercechi (2016–2020)
- Hania Pérez de Cuéllar Lubienska (2020–2021)
- Julián Palacín Gutierrez (2021–2023)
- Karin Cáceres Durango (2023)

== See also ==
- Copyright law of Peru
