= Rafael Rey =

Peruvian engineer, political commentator and politician

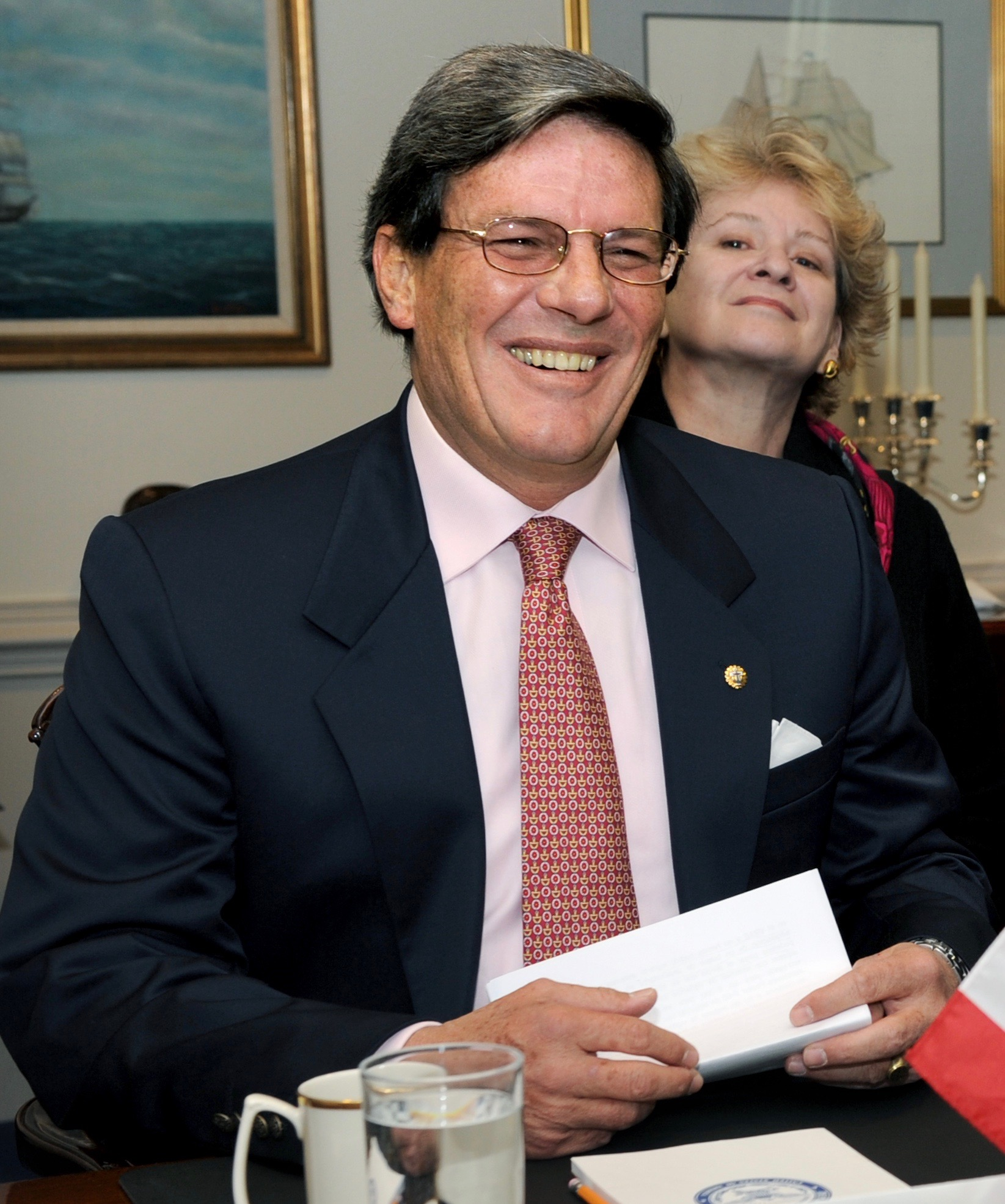
- Rey in 2010

Second Vice President of the Democratic Constituent Congress
- In office 20 December 1992 – 26 July 1995
- President: Jaime Yoshiyama
- Preceded by: Position established
- Succeeded by: Carlos Torres y Torres Lara (as Second Vice President of the Congress of the Republic of Peru)

Minister of Transport and Communications
- In office 28 July 2026 – 18 September 2026
- President: Keiko Fujimori
- Prime Minister: Luis Galarreta
- Preceded by: Aldo Prieto
- Succeeded by: José Tangherlini

Minister of Defense
- In office 11 July 2009 – 14 September 2010
- President: Alan García
- Prime Minister: Javier Velásquez
- Preceded by: Antero Flores Aráoz
- Succeeded by: Jaime Thorne León

Minister of Production
- In office 28 July 2006 – 14 October 2008
- President: Alan García
- Prime Minister: Jorge Del Castillo
- Preceded by: David Lemor
- Succeeded by: Elena Conterno
Additional offices
Member of the Central Reserve Bank of Peru Board of Directors
In office 16 November 2016 – 18 November 2021
Appointed by	Congress of the Repunlic
President	Julio Velarde
Ambassador of Peru to Italy
In office 17 February 2009 – 11 July 2009
President	Alan García
Preceded by	Carlos Roca Cáceres
Succeeded by	Augusto Ferrero Costa
President of National Renewal
In office 1 September 1992 – 30 July 2012
Preceded by	Party founded
Succeeded by	Party dissolved

Member of Congress
- In office 26 July 1995 – 26 July 2006
- Constituency: National (1995–2001); Lima (2001–2006)
- In office 26 July 1990 – 5 April 1992
- Constituency: Lima
Other parliamentary offices
Representative of the Andean Parliament
In office 26 July 2006 – 26 July 2016
Constituency	Peru
Member of the Democratic Constituent Congress
In office 26 November 1992 – 26 July 1995
Constituency	National

Personal details
- Born: Rafael Rey Rey; 26 February 1954 (age 72) Lima, Peru
- Party: FP (since 2010)
- Other political affiliations: MIL (1987–1992); RN (1992–2012)
- Education: University of Piura; Catholic University of Peru

Rafael Rey Rey (Spanish pronunciation: [rafaˌel ˌrei ˈrei]; born February 26, 1954) is a Peruvian engineer, political commentator and politician who currently serves as Minister of Transport and Communications under President Keiko Fujimori since July 2026. He previously served as a member of the Central Reserve Bank of Peru Board of Directors from 2016 to 2021. Throughout his political life, he served in the Peruvian Congress from 1990 to 2006 and as a Representative to the Andean Parliament from 2006 to 2016. During the Second presidency of Alan García, he was appointed Minister of Production, Ambassador to Italy and Minister of Defense.

In 2010, Rey was selected by Keiko Fujimori as her first running mate in the 2011 general election with the Force 2011 ticket alongside ex-minister Jaime Yoshiyama, being ultimately defeated by Ollanta Humala's Peru Wins ticket. Simultaneously, he was re-elected to the Andean Parliament as the Force 2011 representative with more than 470,000 votes, the best result for any candidate nationwide.

Rey is recognized as one of the most representative conservative politicians of Peru. He founded and led the now-defunct National Renewal, a conservative party which formed as part of the National Unity Alliance for the 2001 and 2006 general elections.

Rafael Rey is implicated in an alleged crime against public faith.

== Early life and education ==
Rafael Rey was born to engineering professor Ricardo Rey Polis and Elsa Rey Elmore. He started his education at the Catholic college of San Isidro, owned by Marist Brothers. From 1971 to 1979 Rey studied Industrial Engineering at the University of Piura, where his father was first Rector, and the Catholic University of Peru. From 1982 to 1990 he was CEO of Crowley Peru S.A.

Since 1991 Rey has been Executive President of the NPO Pro-Educación.

== Political career ==
=== Early political career ===
In 1987 he joined the pro-market Liberty Movement of Nobel laureate writer Mario Vargas Llosa which became part of the 1988 established broad liberal-conservative Democratic Front (FREDEMO). Rey represented his party as Deputy National Secretary for Ideology and Culture in 1989 and Departmental Secretary for Lima from October 1989 to August 1992. In the polarised 1990 general elections, he was elected Member of the Chamber of Deputies under the FREDEMO ticket whereas the leader of the alliance, Vargas Llosa, was defeated in the presidential race by Alberto Fujimori of Cambio 90. After Fujimori's self-coup during the constitutional crisis in 1992 and the decline of FREDEMO, Rey left the Liberty Movement and formed his own party, the National Renewal in August 1992, which he has chaired ever since.

=== Congressman ===
Rafael Rey was elected Member of the so-called Democratic Constitutional Congress under the new unicameral constitution in 1992. He was re-elected Congressman for the National Renewal in 1995 and in 2000 as part of the Avancemos alliance led by Federico Salas who was afterwards appointed Prime Minister by President Fujimori. In the 2001 early elections caused by the corruption crisis leading to Fujimori's resignation, Rey contested as part of the Christian Democrats-led National Unity alliance of presidential candidate Lourdes Flores and was re-elected to the Congress. In 2006, he was voted one of five Peruvian representatives to the Andean Parliament, again on the ballot of Flores' National Unity.

=== Minister in the García administration ===
As President Alan García of the social democratic Peruvian Aprista Party did not have a stable majority in Congress, he and his changing Prime Ministers tried to win multi-partisan support. Thus they appointed Rey twice to their governments, as Minister of Production from 2006 to 2008, and as Minister of Defense for a short period from 2009 to 2010. In between he served as Ambassador to Italy for from February to July 2009. His participation in Garcia's government led to the break with Flores and her oppositional National Unity Alliance.

=== Presidential election 2011 ===
In the 2011 general election Rafael Rey changed sides and allied with Fujimori's daughter Keiko. He was the candidate for First Vice President on the Force 2011 ticket. Keiko Fujimori lost to left-wing Ollanta Humala in the second round on June 5. Nevertheless, Rey was re-elected to the Andean Parliament as the Force 2011 representative with more than 470,000 votes, the best result for any candidate nationwide.

=== Member of the Central Reserve Bank of Peru Board of Directors ===
On October 27, 2016, he was elected by Congress as Director of the Central Reserve Bank of Peru (BCRP). This election generated controversy, since it was believed that Rafael Rey had no studies or experience in economic matters or monetary policy Due to a statement where Rey Rey commented that the experience he has in these matters is that "that every person with common sense has" and indicated the following: "Of course I have to study and proceed with the prudence of the case and the position require". However, later Rey himself clarified that he had taken his statements incompletely, since what he had said was that "in addition to having the knowledge and professional experience, he would proceed with great prudence to study the reports and reports that would reach him as director of the BCR".

== Personal life ==
Rey is a numerary member of Opus Dei. During the COVID-19 pandemic in Peru, Rey announced that he contracted the virus on March 20, 2020.
