= Mestizo Alejo =

Chilean mestizo

- Born: Alejandro de Vivar; 1635; Chile
- Died: 1660 (aged 24–25); Chile
- Relatives: Various wives
- Military career
- Allegiance: Spanish Empire (until 1656); Mapuche (1656–1660)
- Branch: Army of Arauco
- Rank: Toqui
- Nicknames: Alejo, Mestizo Alejo, Ñancu (Mapudungun)
- Military conflicts: Mapuche uprising of 1655; Battle of Conuco

Mapuche flag that according to the story of the ancients means morning star

Alejandro de Vivar (1635–1660), better known as Mestizo Alejo, was a Chilean mestizo, who fought in the Arauco War. He was the son of the Mapuche cacique Curivilú and the Spanish Isabel de Vivar y Castro who was captured during a Mapuche raid. Isabel and Alejo were rescued five years later and rejoined the Spanish society. Alejo enlisted the Spanish army, but the system of castas prevented his promotion. As a result, he deserted from the Spanish army and joined the Mapuches, being appointed toqui. Instructed in Spanish military strategy, he posed a serious threat to his former masters, but he died in a crime of passion: after he had sex with a captured Spanish woman his two wives murdered him.

== Biography ==
Alejandro Vivar, Isabel's father, was a Spanish soldier in the Captaincy General of Chile during the Arauco War against the Mapuches. He led an incursion into Mapuche territory and was ambushed by them. Isabel was captured and engaged to the cacique Curivilú. She had a son with him, known as "Alejandro de Vivar" by the Spanish and "Ñancú" by the Mapuche; but he used the diminutive form of the name "Alejo" instead.

Isabel and Alejo were rescued by the Spanish five years after Isabel's capture and returned to Concepción. However, the caste system of the local population meant they were looked down on: Alejo was rejected as a mestizo, and Isabel for having a son with a Mapuche. To avoid the social criticism, Isabel became a nun and lived inside a convent. Alejo was raised by Franciscans and eventually joined the military. Alejo trained as arquebusier, but he was denied any promotion as he was a mestizo. As a result, he deserted from the Spanish army in 1657 and joined the Mapuche.

Alejo returned to the tribe of his father. The Mapuche had a more welcoming attitude towards mestizos than the Spanish, and accepted him. Alejo was valuable to the Mapuches as he had close knowledge of the Spanish military strategy. He informed his father about his life among the Spanish (known as "huincas" by the Mapuches), and expressed his willingness to serve with the Mapuche against them.

As the new toqui, Alejo increased espionage activity and intensified the raids of malones to steal cattle, weapons and capture hostages. He introduced the use of incendiary devices to Mapuche warfare, which proved deadly against the city of Concepción. To prevent the complete destruction of the city, the Spanish sent Isabel to parley with him. Alejo agreed to stop the attack because of his love for his mother, but said "Mother, it will be very difficult for those arrogant huincas to look you in the eyes. They are haughty enough to humiliate mestizos, but they are cowards incapable of defending themselves and have to resort to using a woman to parley with the enemy in their name, while they are surely trembling behind those walls. The other Mapuche were unwilling to stop the attack, but Alejo quickly silenced the objections by splitting open the head of one of the enraged Mapuche with an axe.

Alejo continued his march and destroyed the forts of Conuco and Chepe completely. He then massacred the populations of Talcamavida and Santa Juana. He celebrated one of his victories by getting drunk and raped a captured Spanish woman. This angered his Mapuche wives who attacked and killed him while he was sleeping, and then escaped to a Spanish fort. The Spanish welcomed them and gave them asylum.

== In popular media ==
Víctor Domingo Silva wrote a historical novel about Alejo, "El mestizo Alejo y la Criollita".

The life of Alejo was portrayed in a Chilean historical comic written in 1973, as part of a number of historical comic books about the history of Chile from the colonization to the Patria vieja. The episode "El mestizo Alejo" was published in issues 178 to 184, with art and scripts by Luis Ruiz Tagle.

The actor Diego Ruiz took part in the documentary film Algo habrán hecho por la historia de Chile, playing Alejo. The documentary was produced during the Bicentennial of Chile.

== Bibliography ==
- Manuel Vicuña (2010). Algo habrán hecho por la historia de Chile [They sure did something for the history of Chile] (Documentary film) (in Spanish). Chile: TVN.
- Amunategui, Miguel Luis (1910). Los precursores de la independencia de Chile. Santiago de Chile: Barcelona.
- Inostroza Rojas, Guillermo (1990). Batallas de Chile. Santiago de Chile.
