= BAP Gamarra =

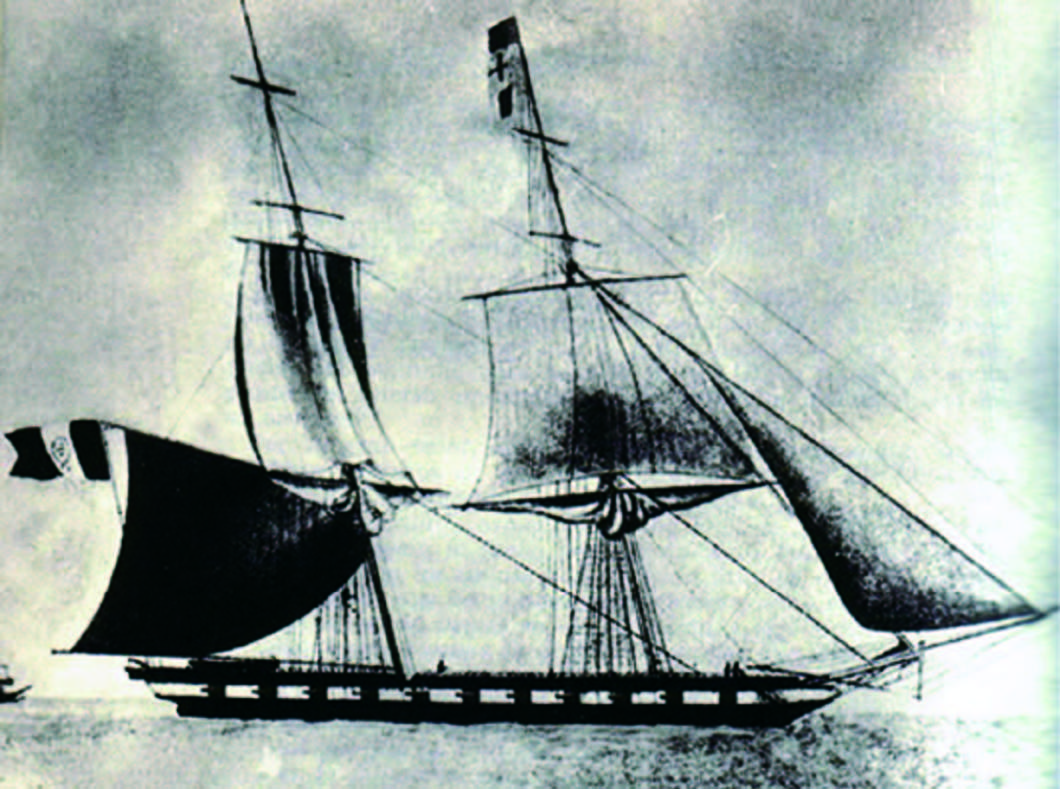

History

Peru
- Name: Gamarra
- Namesake: Agustín Gamarra
- Launched: 1843
- Fate: Unknown

General characteristics
- Class & type: Brigantine
- Length: 77 ft (23.5 m)
- Beam: 24 ft (7.3 m)
- Draft: 14 ft (4.3 m)
- Propulsion: Sail
- Complement: 136
- Armament: 16 cannons

BAP Gamarra was a brigantine of the Peruvian Navy, sister ship of BAP Guise. Its acquisition took place during the first government of President Ramón Castilla y Marquesado, and its name was assigned in honour of former Peruvian President Agustín Gamarra.

The ship was built in 1843 in the shipyards of the city of Trieste —then under the rule of the Austrian Empire and now part of Italy— by order of the Peruvian government. It had 415 tons of displacement, was 77 feet (23 m) long, 24 feet (7.3 m) wide, and had a draft of 14 feet (4.3 m). It was armed with 16 cannons and had a crew of 136 men.

== Service history ==
Following the annexation of what is now California —among other territories— by the United States in 1848, the search for gold deposits sparked a mining rush, drawing numerous immigrants. A common practice at that time was the arrival of vessels to the Californian coast —including those from Peru— carrying food, clothing, and tools. Upon selling their cargo, their crews would often abandon the ships to participate in the gold rush, leaving the vessels abandoned or neglected in the port of San Francisco.

In response, a petition was submitted to President Ramón Castilla. On 21 December 1848, he ordered the dispatch of the ship Gamarra to San Francisco, commanded by captain José María Silva Rodríguez. The mission was tasked with locating and, if feasible, reclaiming and returning Peruvian ships. The Gamarra departed on 25 January 1849 and arrived in San Francisco in mid-March. Upon arrival, the mission identified nine Peruvian vessels: the barges Elisa and San José; the brigantines Susana, Mazzeppa, Calderón, Volante, and Andrea; and the schooners Bella Angelita and Atalante. Vessels deemed seaworthy were repaired and refitted for the return voyage, while others were sold. Gamarra made brief stopovers in Paita and Huacho before returning to Callao on 30 August 1849.

In 1850, Ramón Castilla, in his message to Congress, made mention of the mission carried out by the ship:

To understand the current state of the Navy, extensive investigations are not necessary. It is enough to contemplate our flag honourably fulfilling duties in California which other respectable flags have failed to fulfil.

— President Ramón Castilla to the Congress of Peru, 1850
