= Jaime Thorne León =

Peruvian politician

Jaime Thorne Leon
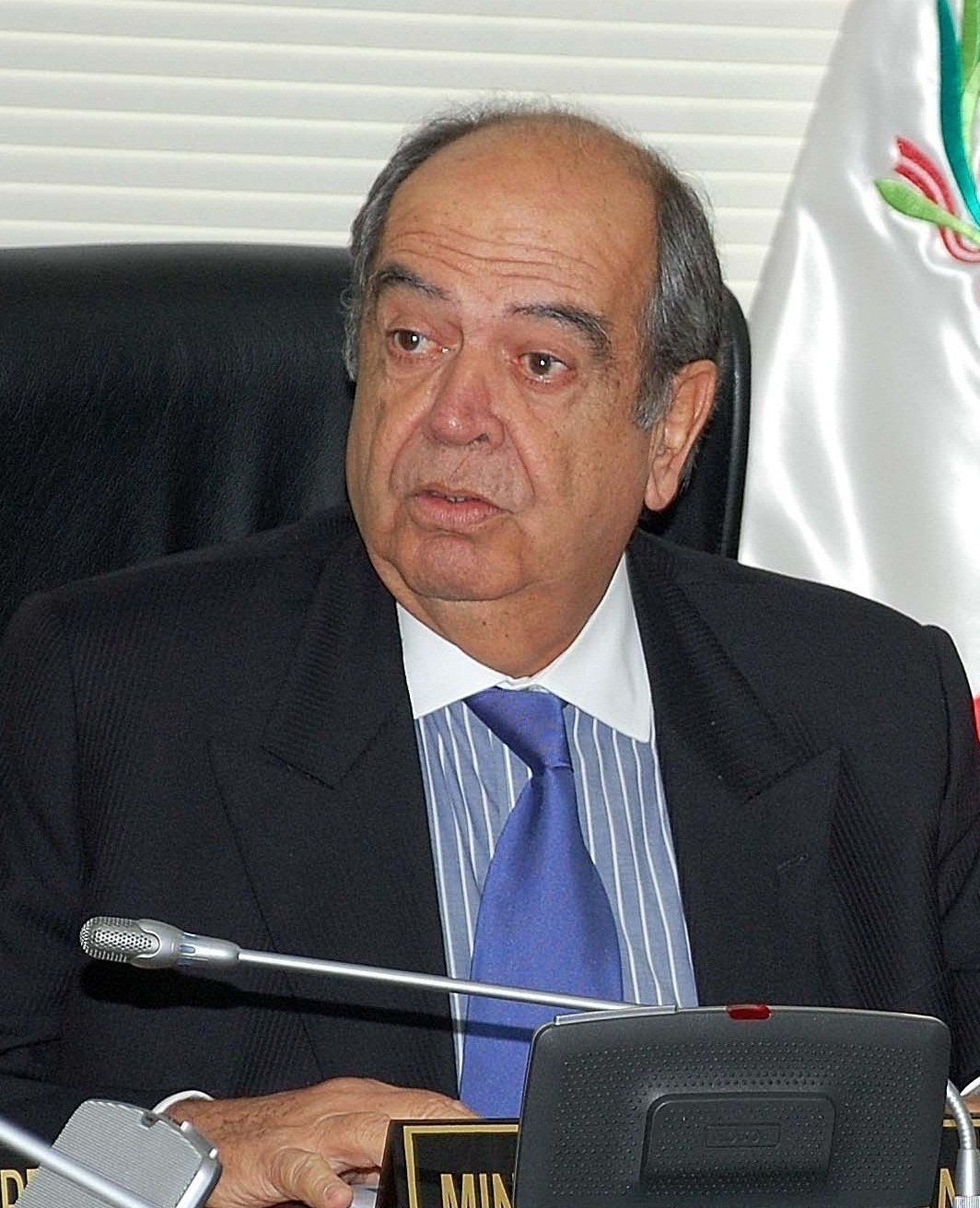

Minister of Defense
- In office 14 September 2010 – 28 July 2011
- President: Alan García
- Prime Minister: José Antonio Chang; Rosario Fernández
- Preceded by: Rafael Rey
- Succeeded by: Daniel Mora

Personal details
- Born: 11 September 1943 Lima, Peru
- Died: 5 April 2018 (aged 74) Lima, Peru
- Party: Independent
- Profession: Lawyer

Jaime Fernando Thorne León (11 September 1943 – 5 April 2018) was a Peruvian politician who served as the Minister of Defense under the administration of President Alan García Pérez, from September 2010 to July 2011.

== Biography ==
He was the son of the Peruvian banker and merchant Rollin Thorne Sologuren, former director of the Italian Bank of Lima, and of María Josefina Teresa León y Bueno. His maternal grandfather was José Matías León y Carrera, former Minister of Justice, Education, Worship and Charity.

He was the brother of Ana Teresa Thorne León, wife of former Foreign Minister Fernando de Trazegnies Granda and Marchioness of Torrebermeja as well as uncle of the Archbishop of Lima and Primate of Peru Juan Luis Cipriani Thorne and former Minister of Economy and Finance Alfredo Thorne Vetter.

He studied at the Colegio Inmaculado Corazón and at the Colegio Santa María Marianistas, following his law studies at the Pontifical Catholic University of Peru and the National University of Trujillo. He also completed a postgraduate degree in financial accounting at the ESAN University.

He was an arbitrator of the National and International Arbitration Center of the Lima Chamber of Commerce and secretary of the National Elections Jury. He was also a professor of Civil Procedural Law at the University of Lima and was one of the founding partners of the law firm Thorne, Echeandía & Lema Abogados.

A lawyer, Thorne León was the President of the Peruvian National Institute for the Defense of Competition and the Protection of Intellectual Property, a.k.a. INDECOPI, until he was appointed Minister of Defense by President Alan García in September 2010.
