= Copyright law of Peru =

Peru is a signatory to the Berne Convention, and the basic law on copyright is contained in Legislative Decree No. 822 of April 23, 1996. Related and subsequent amending legislation are listed at the relevant WIPO page.
