= Center for Higher National Studies =

Military academy in Lima, Peru

The Center for Higher National Studies is a military-training academic institution located in Lima, Peru. In July 2024 it hosted the first Peru-South Korea Symposium on Defense Industry Cooperation.
