= National Renewal (Peru) =

National Renewal Renovación Nacional
- Abbreviation: RN
- Leader: Rafael Rey
- Founded: 1 September 1992
- Dissolved: 30 July 2012
- Headquarters: Jr. Tacna 3321, San Martín de Porres Lima, Peru
- Ideology: Majority: Christian democracy Conservatism; Factions: Fujimorism
- Political position: Right-wing
- National affiliation: National Unity (2001-2006); Force 2011 (2010-2011)

Website
- http://www.renovacionnacional.org.pe

National Renewal (Spanish: Renovación Nacional, RN) was a Christian democratic and right-leaning political party in Peru that was founded in 1992 in Lima by conservative politician Rafael Rey. The party was dissolved in 2012, following the 2011 general election, as it did not participate formally in the election; Rey ran with the Force 2011 as the second running mate of Keiko Fujimori. The party was part of the National Unity Alliance from 2001 until 2006.

== History ==
The party was founded in 1992 by Rafael Rey, who until then had been a Congressman representing the Democratic Front, being officially registered on June 21, 2005.
