= Presidential campaigns of Keiko Fujimori =

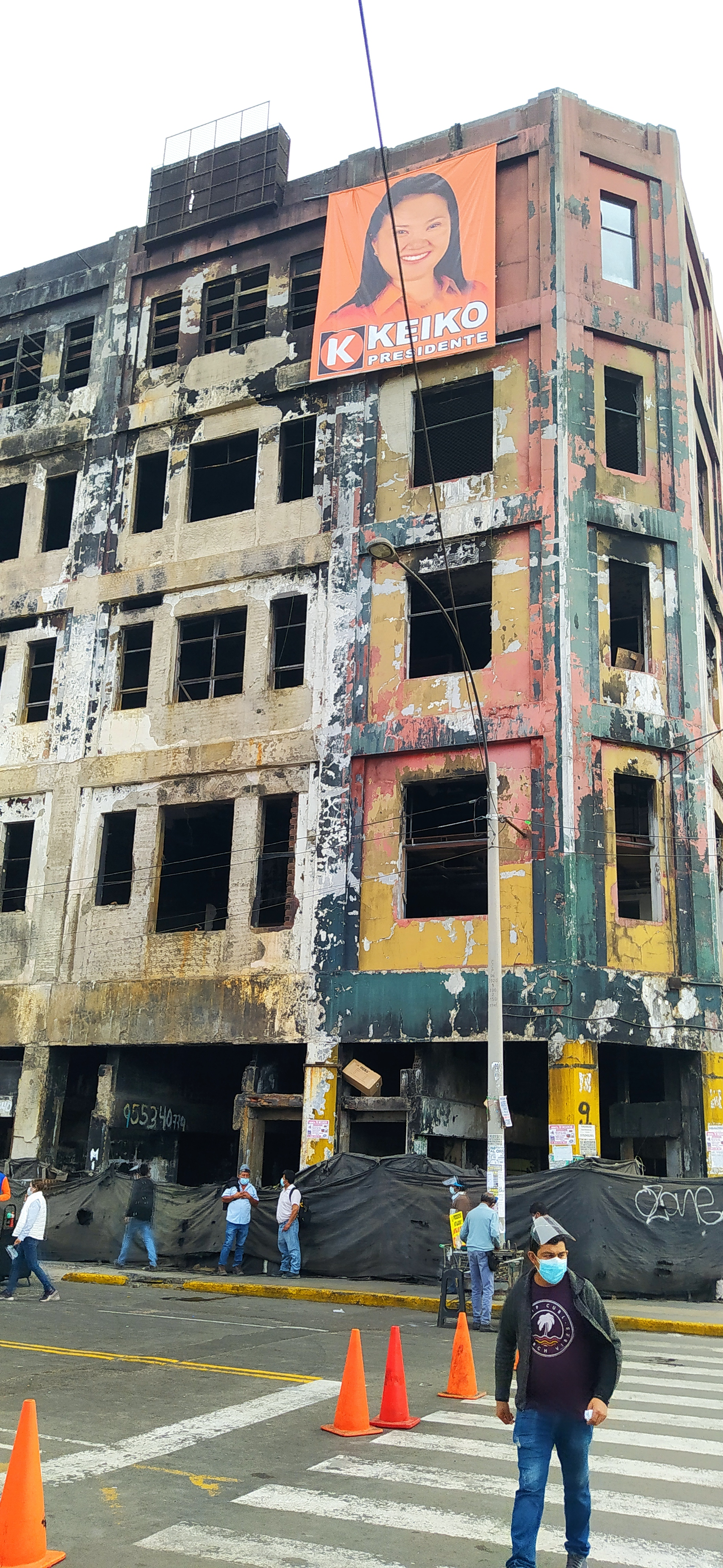
A Fujimori campaign poster on a fire-damaged building in central Lima during the 2021 election

Keiko Fujimori, leader of the Peruvian party Popular Force and eldest daughter of former president Alberto Fujimori, ran for president of Peru in four consecutive general elections: 2011, 2016, 2021, and 2026. The only candidate in modern Peruvian history to reach four consecutive presidential runoffs, she lost the first three by narrow margins before defeating Roberto Sánchez in 2026 by fewer than 50,000 votes. The victory made her the first woman elected president of Peru, returning Fujimorism to the presidency 25 years after her father's government collapsed.

Fujimori's father's 1990–2000 government was a central issue in each campaign, and her position on his legacy shifted over time. She pledged not to pardon him in 2011 and 2016, signing a public commitment in 2016 to reject his government's authoritarian practices. She reversed this position in 2021, promising a pardon, and in 2026 campaigned on continuity with his security and economic record. Her platforms combined hardline "mano dura" security policies with support for Peru's market-oriented economic model. Each campaign also mobilized a durable "anti-Fujimorist" bloc (voters opposed to her candidacy on principle) which analysts have identified as a factor in her three defeats. Commentators have characterized her politics variously as conservative, right-wing populist, or far-right; she has presented Fujimorism as a modern conservative, law-and-order movement.

Through Fujimori's campaigns, Popular Force (founded as Force 2011) became Peru's dominant legislative force, holding a congressional majority or leading bloc from 2016 onward and using it to destabilize successive presidencies and shield Fujimori from prosecution. From 2018 she faced the Odebrecht-related Cocktails Case, which alleged money laundering in her 2011 and 2016 campaign finances; she spent more than a year in pretrial detention before the case was dismissed in January 2026, days after she launched her successful fourth bid. Her candidacies were repeatedly marked by contested results: she made unsubstantiated fraud claims after losing in 2021, and her 2026 victory was similarly disputed by her defeated opponent.

== 2011 campaign ==
=== Party formation and organization ===
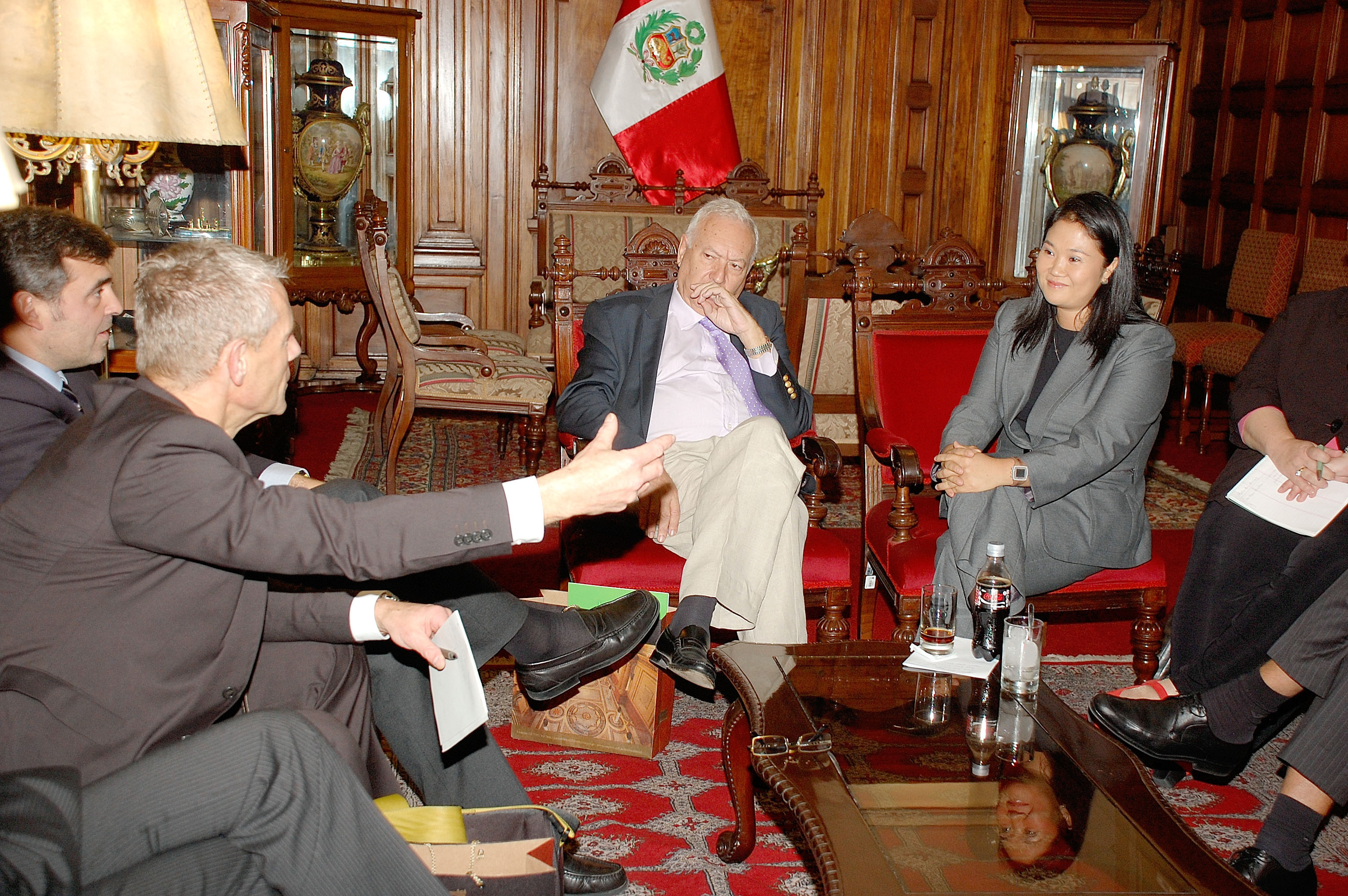
Fujimori meeting with members of the European Parliament including later Spanish Foreign Minister José Manuel García-Margallo in Lima in 2010, ahead of the election the following year

Fujimori announced the creation of a new party, Force 2011 (later Popular Force), in January 2008, intended to carry her father's movement into the 2011 election with herself as candidate if he remained legally barred from running. The move split Fujimorism between "albertista" loyalists of Alberto Fujimori and "keikista" supporters of his daughter, with the older Fujimorist vehicles Cambio 90 and New Majority retaining their independence. The party was formally registered in March 2010 after collecting more than one million signatures, far exceeding the legal requirement.

In a study of the campaign, political scientist Adriana Urrutia argued that Force 2011 used the election itself as an instrument of party-building and of relegitimizing Fujimorism: the campaign activated organizational networks and latent loyalties dating to the 1990s, and the composition of its technical team — dominated by lawyers, technocrats, and business executives — reproduced the recruitment patterns of Fujimorist congressional benches from the 1990–2001 period. The organization remained personalist and vertical: candidate selection was controlled by a small leadership circle around the Fujimori family, with Alberto Fujimori himself deciding, from prison, who appeared on the party's congressional lists. Ana Herz de la Vega, a longtime family confidante, served as party secretary. For the presidential ticket, Fujimori declared her candidacy in December 2010 with defense minister Rafael Rey of the conservative National Renewal as first vice-presidential candidate and Jaime Yoshiyama, a minister under her father, as second. The campaign also retained former New York mayor Rudy Giuliani as a security-policy adviser.

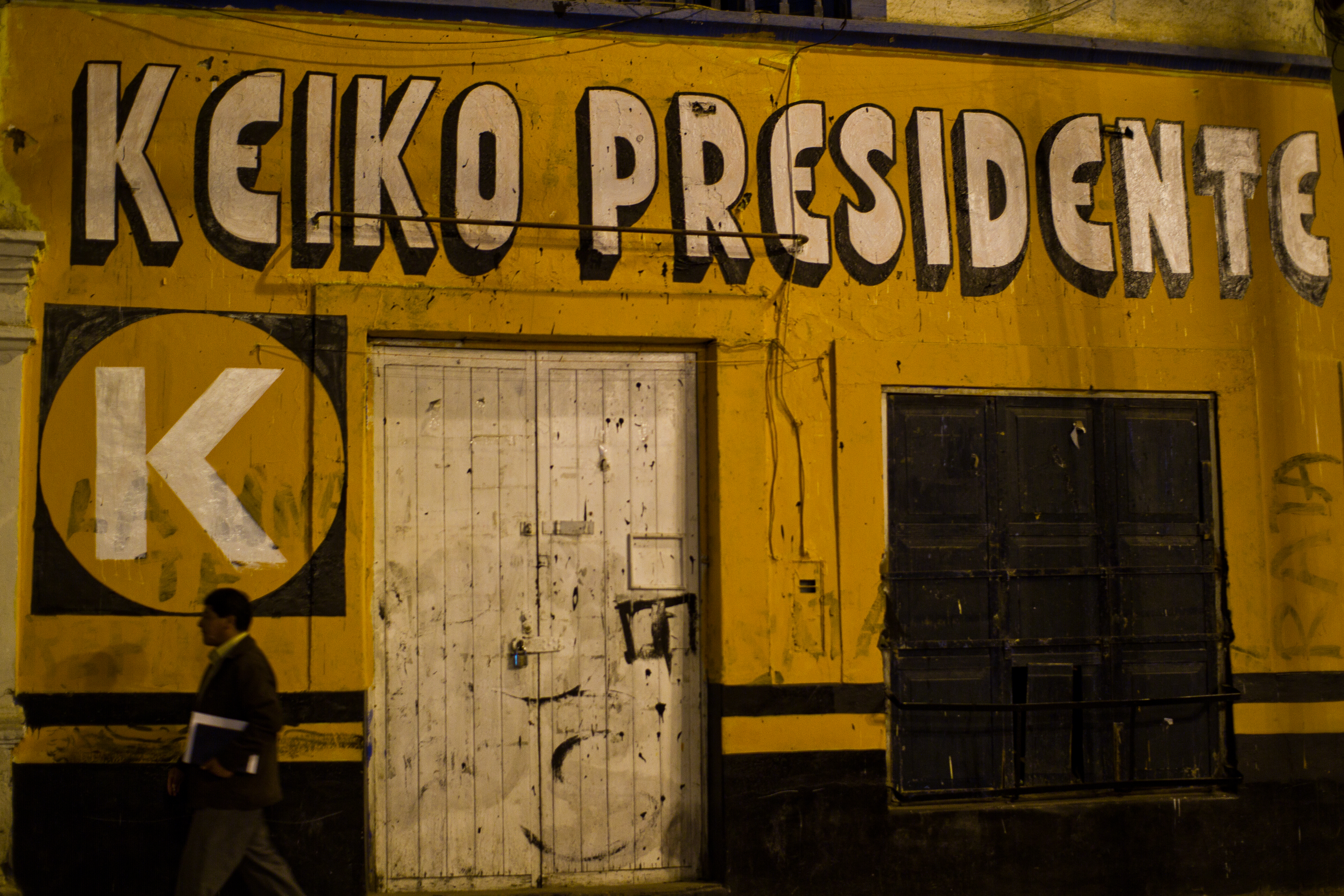
Mural in support of Fujimori's campaign in 2011 Peruvian general election

=== Platform and first-round campaign ===
The party's government plan rested on four pillars — eliminating extreme poverty, a more efficient state, defeating crime and terrorism, and employment promotion — alongside proposals for the death penalty for certain crimes, free trade, and merit-based education reform. The candidacy was built substantially on a defense of her father's government, credited with defeating terrorism and stabilizing the economy, while distancing itself from its collapse: Fujimori attributed human-rights violations and corruption principally to Vladimiro Montesinos, acknowledged "errors" and "excesses", recalled her own opposition to her father's third term, and pledged not to use the presidential pardon power on his behalf. During the campaign she acknowledged receiving US$10,000 in her 2006 congressional race from donors with drug-trafficking convictions, characterizing them as victims of persecution.

=== First round ===
In the 10 April first round, Fujimori placed second with about 23.6% of valid votes, behind the left-nationalist Ollanta Humala of Peru Wins (31.7%) and ahead of Pedro Pablo Kuczynski, Alejandro Toledo, and Luis Castañeda Lossio. Force 2011 became the second-largest congressional bloc with 37 seats, and her brother Kenji Fujimori won the highest individual vote of any congressional candidate. Analysts at the Instituto de Estudios Peruanos read the Humala–Fujimori runoff pairing as evidence that, despite five years of growth, large parts of the electorate remained distrustful of institutions and demanded a stronger state presence.

=== Runoff: endorsements, debates, and strategy ===
The runoff realigned the eliminated field: Kuczynski, Castañeda, and former APRA candidate Mercedes Aráoz endorsed Fujimori, while Toledo — and, prominently, Nobel laureate Mario Vargas Llosa, who described a Fujimori presidency as the worse of two dangers — backed Humala. With roughly half the electorate rejecting each candidate in polls, the Barcelona Centre for International Affairs estimated that some eight million mostly centrist voters saw themselves as choosing a "lesser evil"; according to political scientist Sinesio López, each campaign mobilized fear of the other — economic disruption under Humala, a return to 1990s corruption and abuses under Fujimori.

Both campaigns pivoted toward the center. Fujimori moderated her discourse and deepened her distancing from her father, while, according to a study of the campaign's messaging, Force 2011 shifted its central frame from security and opportunity to "defense of the economic model", exploiting doubts about Humala's commitment to the market economy. Urrutia observed a cost to this pivot: the elevation of the "keikista" leadership circle over "albertista" networks in the second round led some regional party bases to withdraw active support.

The formal runoff debates comprised a technical-team debate between Peru Wins and Force 2011 policy teams and a candidates' debate on 29 May in Lima. In the latter, Humala pressed Fujimori on her role as first lady during the forced sterilizations of the 1990s, while Fujimori sought to tie Humala to Montesinos's flight from Peru and attacked his past coup attempts; she insisted that Humala was debating her, not her father. Contemporary coverage described the exchange as dominated as much by mutual attacks as by proposals — Fujimori emphasizing free school meals and early-childhood programs, Humala his "Pensión 65" transfer for the elderly poor.

=== Result ===
Final polls showed a statistical tie. In the 5 June runoff Fujimori lost to Humala, 48.66% to 51.34% — a margin of about 450,000 votes, the widest of her four runoffs — drawing her strongest support from the business community, conservatives, most of the press, small business, the church, and the Lima middle class, and, within poorer electorates, performing better in urban-marginal districts than rural ones, where Humala won 40 of the country's 49 poorest provinces. She conceded on election night and congratulated Humala personally.

=== Between campaigns ===
In 2012–2013 the party was renamed Fuerza Popular, retaining Fujimori as president and its orange "K" branding. Political scientist Paolo Sosa has described the inter-election period as a deliberate institutionalization drive motivated by the 2011 runoff defeat: the party sidelined figures associated with the most controversial episodes of 1990s Fujimorism, recruited younger and more technical cadres, and organized nationally with the explicit goal of winning in 2016. Fujimori traveled the country to soften resistance tied to her father's legacy and led opinion polling through 2015 despite holding no public office. A family request for a humanitarian pardon for her father was denied by President Humala in 2013.

== 2016 campaign ==
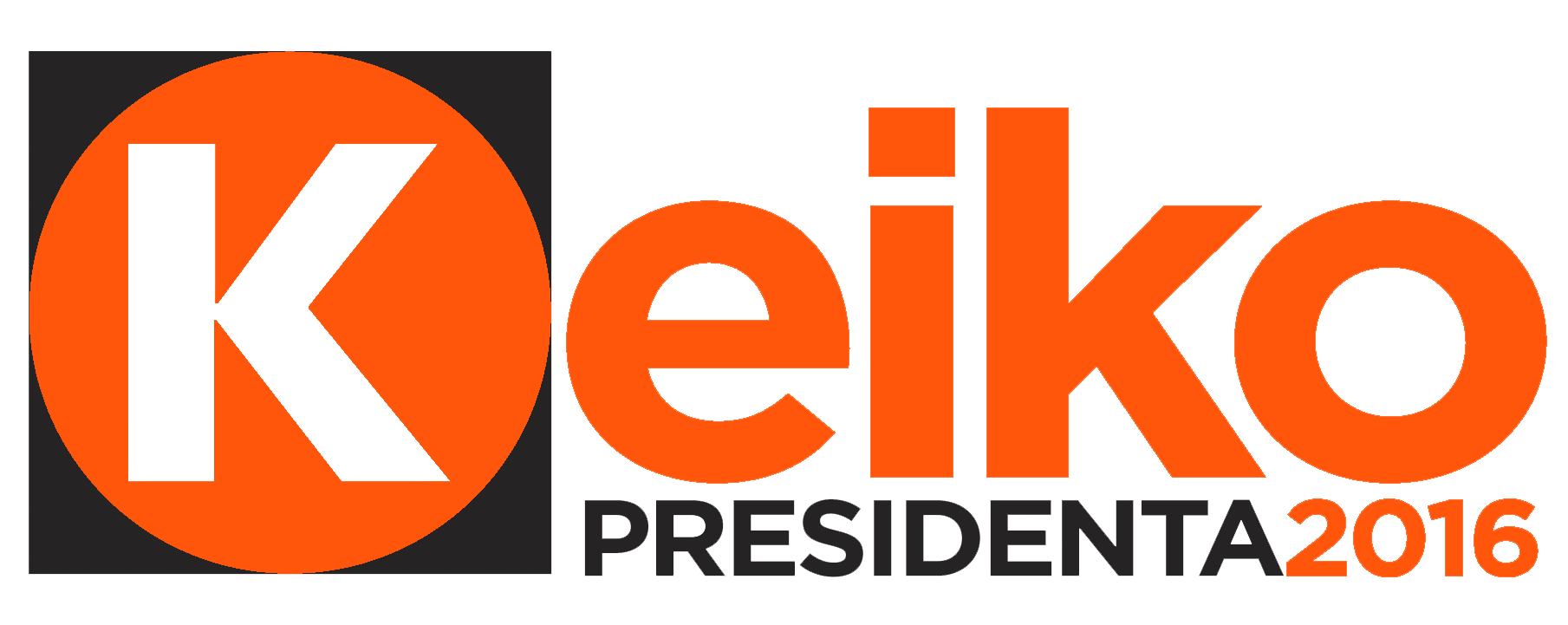
Fujimori 2016 campaign logo

=== Party renewal and candidacy ===
Popular Force approached 2016 with the explicit goal, set after the 2011 runoff defeat, of winning outright. Political scientist Paolo Sosa has described the intervening party renewal as a bid to institutionalize and moderate: figures evocative of the most controversial episodes of 1990s Fujimorism were sidelined, more technical cadres recruited, and the presidential ticket composed to signal the shift — though, Sosa notes, the process sharpened internal conflict between the classic Fujimorist old guard and Keiko Fujimori's renovating circle. Fujimori announced her candidacy on 4 December 2015 with José Chlimper, a former agriculture minister under her father, and Vladimiro Huaroc, a former regional governor of Junín, as running mates, on a platform of six "pillars" combining institutional and human-rights guarantees, free-market economics, tax cuts, small-business incentives, and rural electricity and internet expansion.

The pre-election period was dominated by JNE disqualifications. Of 19 initial candidates, nine were excluded or withdrew; leading rivals César Acuña (for handing out money at campaign events) and Julio Guzmán (over internal party-procedure defects) were barred, while a parallel bid to disqualify Fujimori over allegedly prohibited gift-giving was dismissed for lack of evidence. Press coverage noted that the divergent outcomes fueled suspicions of uneven application of the electoral rules and, in some readings, of rulings favorable to Fujimori's candidacy.

=== First round and the anti-authoritarian pledge ===
Facing sustained anti-Fujimorist mobilization — including a march of more than 50,000 people in Lima's Plaza San Martín on the anniversary of the 1992 self-coup, organized around the "No a Keiko" movement — Fujimori made her most explicit break yet with her father's record. At the JNE's first-round candidates' debate on 3 April, she signed a "commitment of honor" pledging to respect democratic institutions, term limits, and press freedom and not to repeat the authoritarian practices of his government; she promised not to pardon him (describing it as a family decision), endorsed the findings of the Truth and Reconciliation Commission for the first time, pledged reparations for women subjected to forced sterilizations, and stated she would not seek re-election if she won. Her disapproval nonetheless remained around 45%, driven principally by her father's legacy.

She won the 10 April first round decisively with about 40% of valid votes, against roughly 21% for Pedro Pablo Kuczynski of Peruvians for Change and 19% for the left's Verónika Mendoza, and Popular Force took an absolute majority of 73 of 130 congressional seats — the platform of legislative power it would hold for the following decade.

=== Runoff: campaign, debates, and the Ramírez affair ===
Fujimori entered the runoff as favorite, leading Kuczynski by roughly five points in post-debate polling in late May, and pursued a two-track strategy: touring the provinces where Fujimorism retained a base — casting Kuczynski's program as elitist and hers as one of "shared growth" for the informal economy and small enterprise — while broadening her technical credibility by recruiting economist Hernando de Soto, a former adviser to her father, to her campaign. The campaign lost a running mate mid-race: Huaroc was removed from the ticket by electoral authorities for distributing gifts during campaigning.

Two runoff debates were held: a decentralized debate in Piura on 22 May — sited outside Lima at Fujimori's urging as a gesture of decentralization — and the JNE's final debate at the University of Lima on 29 May, a week before the vote. Both were marked as much by mutual attack as by proposals. Kuczynski repeatedly invoked her father's record and the corruption allegations surrounding her circle, warning that her government risked producing a "narco-state"; Fujimori — who opened in Quechua and emphasized her five years of provincial travel — countered that Kuczynski was "not debating with my father but with me", attacked his record on gas contracts and labor benefits as a former minister, and reminded him that he had endorsed her in the 2011 runoff.

Her lead collapsed in the final weeks under a compounding scandal. On 15 May the program Cuarto Poder, with Univision, reported that party secretary-general Joaquín Ramírez — one of her principal aides and financiers — was under Drug Enforcement Administration investigation for money laundering, citing a recording in which Ramírez claimed to have "cleaned" US$15 million for the 2011 campaign; Ramírez and Fujimori denied the allegations, and the DEA initially denied investigating Fujimori herself. Peruvian prosecutors simultaneously opened a money-laundering inquiry into her campaign finances, which she dismissed as a smear; Kuczynski amplified fears that Peru would become a narco-state under her presidency.

In the final days the anti-Fujimorist coalition consolidated behind Kuczynski: Mendoza and other left-wing leaders urged a vote for him, a second mass march against Fujimori filled Lima on 31 May — this time with Kuczynski himself participating — and analysts credited the mobilization with tipping late-deciding voters.

=== Result ===
The 5 June runoff was too close to call for days; only on 9 June, with the count complete, did Kuczynski emerge the winner by 50.12% to 49.88% — roughly 41,000 votes. Fujimori conceded on 10 June, pledging a "vigilant" opposition and wishing the president-elect well, while attributing her defeat partly to "promoters of hatred" and the influence of the outgoing government.

=== Between campaigns: opposition, detention, and the Cocktails Case ===
After 2016, Fujimori's congressional majority made her the country's dominant opposition figure; she and allies alleged, without substantiation, that Humala's government and Kuczynski had collaborated to manipulate the election. Popular Force backed the first impeachment attempt against Kuczynski in December 2017; days after it failed, Kuczynski pardoned Alberto Fujimori, deepening a public rift between Keiko and her brother Kenji Fujimori over their father's legacy and control of the movement (see Kenjivideos scandal).

In October 2018 Fujimori was arrested on money-laundering charges tied to allegedly undeclared Odebrecht contributions to her 2011 campaign, with prosecutors alleging she led a criminal organization within her party; she called the case political persecution. She spent intermittent periods in pretrial detention until her release on bail in May 2020. Scholars Baraybar and Gonzalez-Ocantos have written that the Fujimorist-led Congress used legislation — including a new, lower-penalty offense of illegal campaign financing — to shield her from prosecution. In the resulting Cocktails Case she was charged with criminal conspiracy, money laundering, obstruction of justice, and perjury, with prosecutors seeking a 30-year term. The Constitutional Court annulled the trial in October 2025 and the case was dismissed in January 2026.

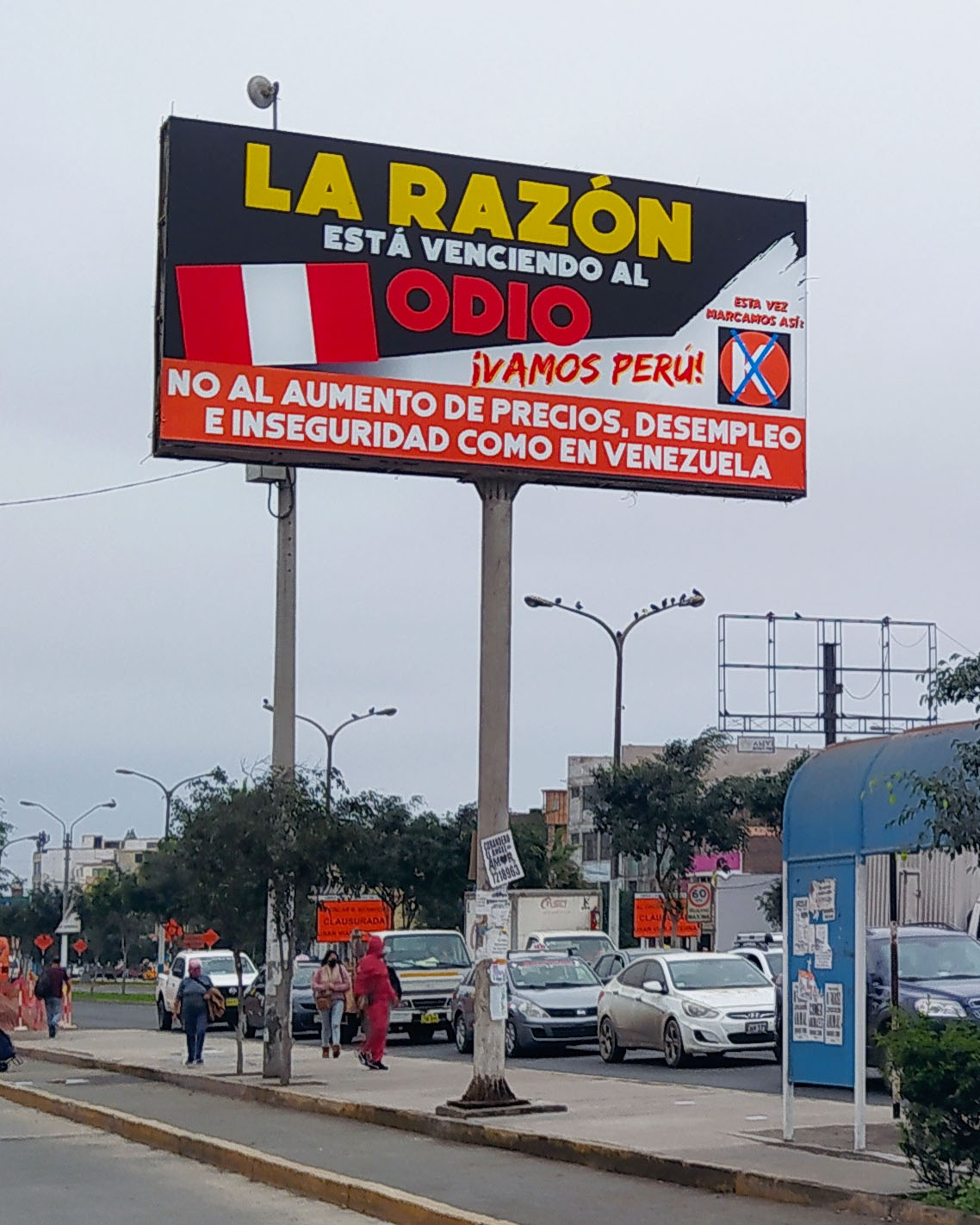
A Popular Force billboard during the 2021 Peruvian general election in Bellavista District, Callao

== 2021 campaign ==
=== Background and announcement ===
The 2021 election — held during the COVID-19 pandemic in Peru, which produced one of the world's highest per-capita death tolls and a severe economic contraction, and in Peru's bicentennial year — followed an extraordinary period of instability in which the country had three presidents in a single week in November 2020. Fujimori's party had helped lead the removal of President Martín Vizcarra on "moral incapacity" grounds, which triggered the 2020 Peruvian protests; after two student protesters were killed in the crackdown, Fujimori called the situation unsustainable and demanded that interim president Manuel Merino resign or face immediate censure.

Fujimori announced her return to full-time politics in September 2020, four months after her release from pretrial detention on bail, and won Popular Force's internal election in December to become its candidate for a third time, with former congressional president Luis Galarreta and Patricia Juárez as running mates. She remained under active investigation in the Odebrecht-related case throughout the campaign, and prosecutors were seeking a 30-year sentence. Her candidacy launched from a position of historic weakness: a Datum poll published the day she secured the nomination found 63% of Peruvians would never vote for her, her party had collapsed from 73 congressional seats to a marginal bloc in the 2020 snap parliamentary election, and the JNE briefly declared her presidential ticket inadmissible in December before admitting a revised slate.

=== Platform and the pardon reversal ===
Fujimori campaigned on governing with a "mano dura" (heavy hand): expanded legal protections for police and armed forces, construction of new prisons to relieve overcrowding paired with expanded probation for minor offenders, and a large pandemic-recovery stimulus — cash transfers and support programs that analysts at Americas Society/Council of the Americas estimated at roughly three percent of GDP, potentially straining Peru's low public debt.

The campaign marked her decisive break with the distancing strategy of 2011 and 2016. Reversing her signed 2016 pledge, she stated openly that she favored pardoning her father, describing a personal rapprochement through letters and his year of freedom following the annulled 2017 pardon, and characterized his government as "not a dictatorship, despite some moments of authoritarianism".

=== First round ===
The 11 April first round featured 18 candidates in the most fragmented field in recent Peruvian history; no candidate reached 20%. Pedro Castillo — a rural schoolteacher and union leader from Cajamarca running for the Marxist-Leninist Free Peru party, who had polled in single digits weeks earlier — finished first with about 19% of valid votes. Fujimori advanced in second place with roughly 13%, narrowly ahead of Rafael López Aliaga and Hernando de Soto, her lowest first-round share across her four campaigns. Popular Force won 24 of 130 congressional seats.[citation needed — exact 2021 Fuerza Popular seat count; verify against ONPE/JNE congressional results]

Days after the first round, Fujimori framed the runoff as a choice between "markets and Marxism", casting Castillo — whose platform included a constituent assembly to replace the 1993 constitution and nationalization rhetoric he later softened — as a communist threat to Peru's economic model.

=== Runoff campaign ===
The runoff inverted the coalition dynamics of 2011 and 2016: for the first time, much of the Lima establishment, business community, and center-right that had previously opposed her rallied to Fujimori as the barrier against the left. Nobel laureate Mario Vargas Llosa — a lifelong adversary of Fujimorism who had backed her opponents in 2011 and 2016 — endorsed her as the option that, in his framing, better preserved democracy and the economic model, and defeated first-round rivals including de Soto and López Aliaga followed. Fujimori sought to soften her image, apologizing for "errors" of past Fujimorist governments and her own confrontational conduct as opposition leader, and campaigned in Castillo's rural strongholds, including a debate held in his home town of Chota.

The race was again marked by mutual fear campaigns — warnings of Venezuelan-style collapse under Castillo against warnings of a return to 1990s authoritarianism and corruption under Fujimori — and by the highest combined rejection ratings of any runoff pairing in Peruvian polling history.[citation needed — comparative rejection-rating claim; attribute to a specific pollster or scholarly source or delete] Anti-Fujimorist marches recurred in Lima in the final weeks. Polls showed Castillo's initially wide lead narrowing to a statistical tie by early June. During the campaign, prosecutor José Domingo Pérez unsuccessfully requested Fujimori's return to pretrial detention over alleged breach of her release conditions.

=== Result and fraud allegations ===
The 6 June runoff produced a near-even split along stark territorial and class lines: Castillo dominated the rural Andes and south, Fujimori the capital and the coast. After a count lasting days, Castillo prevailed by 50.13% to 49.87% — a margin of roughly 44,000 votes.

As Castillo's lead emerged during counting, Fujimori alleged systematic fraud, without presenting substantiating evidence, and her legal team filed challenges seeking to annul some 200,000 votes concentrated in poor, rural, and predominantly Indigenous districts that had voted heavily for Castillo. International observers — including the Organization of American States mission and the Inter-American Union of Electoral Organizations — found the election consistent with international standards and no evidence of widespread fraud, and The Guardian reported that the annulment campaign unleashed racist rhetoric against rural voters from segments of the Lima elite. Commentators in The Washington Post and The Atlantic compared her challenge to Donald Trump's efforts to overturn the 2020 U.S. election; Anne Applebaum noted the personal stakes, since a victory would have suspended the criminal investigations against her until 2026.

The JNE rejected the annulment requests, and its proclamation of Castillo as president-elect was delayed until 19 July, six weeks after the vote, while the challenges were resolved. Fujimori said she would recognize the result while continuing to characterize the election as illegitimate. The Guardian reported that analysts viewed the episode as damaging to her standing after a third consecutive defeat, and the weeks of uncertainty were widely cited as a stress test of Peru's electoral institutions — a precedent invoked again during the prolonged counts of 2026.

== 2026 campaign ==
Keiko Fujimori for President 2026
- Campaign: 2026 Peruvian presidential election
- Candidate: Keiko Fujimori President of the Popular Force (2009 or 2010–present), First Lady of Peru (1994–2000), Member of the Peruvian Congress (2006–2011), Runoff election candidate in 2011, 2016, and the 2021 presidential election; Luis Galarreta Secretary General of the Popular Force (2019–present), President of the Peruvian Congress (2017–2018), Runoff vice presidential candidate in the 2021 presidential election, and several other positions; Miki Torres Member of the Peruvian Congress (2016–2020)
- Affiliation: Popular Force
- Status: Announced: 30 October 2025 (Note: Informally declined to run on 27 December 2022); First round of elections: 12–13 April 2026; Won the first round: 15 May 2026; Second round of elections: 7 June 2026; Election victory: 29 June 2026; Officially declared winner: 3 July 2026; Inauguration: 28 July 2026

=== Background and announcement ===
The 2026 election closed a decade of institutional crisis in which Peru cycled through nine presidents, most departing amid corruption allegations or impeachment proceedings. Fujimori's Popular Force had held the largest or a dominant bloc in Congress for most of that period; the Atlantic Council wrote that the Fujimorist-led legislature had engaged in "constitutional hardball" against successive presidents, and Human Rights Watch argued in a 2025 report that Congress was enabling the growth of organized crime through legislation weakening prosecution tools.

Security dominated the campaign environment. Extortion complaints rose roughly tenfold between 2023 and 2025, with gangs targeting schools, small businesses, and transport workers, and the homicide rate roughly tripled between 2019 and 2024; repeated states of emergency and troop deployments produced little measurable effect.

The Constitutional Court annulled Fujimori's Cocktails Case trial on 20 October 2025, removing her principal legal obstacle; she announced her fourth candidacy ten days later, on 30 October, with Luis Galarreta and Miki Torres as running mates. The case was formally archived in January 2026.

=== Platform ===
Campaigning under the slogan "Peru with order" (Perú con orden), Fujimori centered her fourth bid on the two traditional pillars of Fujimorism: a hardline security agenda and defense of Peru's market-oriented economic model. Her security proposals included an immediate 60-day national state of emergency, expanded police surveillance technology, "civil death" penalties barring convicted extortionists from public employment, prison labor requirements, placing prisons under military control, and reintroducing the anonymous ("faceless") judges used in terrorism trials under her father's government in the 1990s — a measure that, according to Americas Society/Council of the Americas, would require Peru's withdrawal from the Inter-American Court of Human Rights. Economically, she pledged continuity with the model established under the 1993 constitution and courted United States investment, while avoiding taking sides between the United States and China, Peru's largest trading partner and builder of the Chancay megaport. Reprising her 2021 posture, she campaigned openly on her father's legacy rather than distancing herself from it.

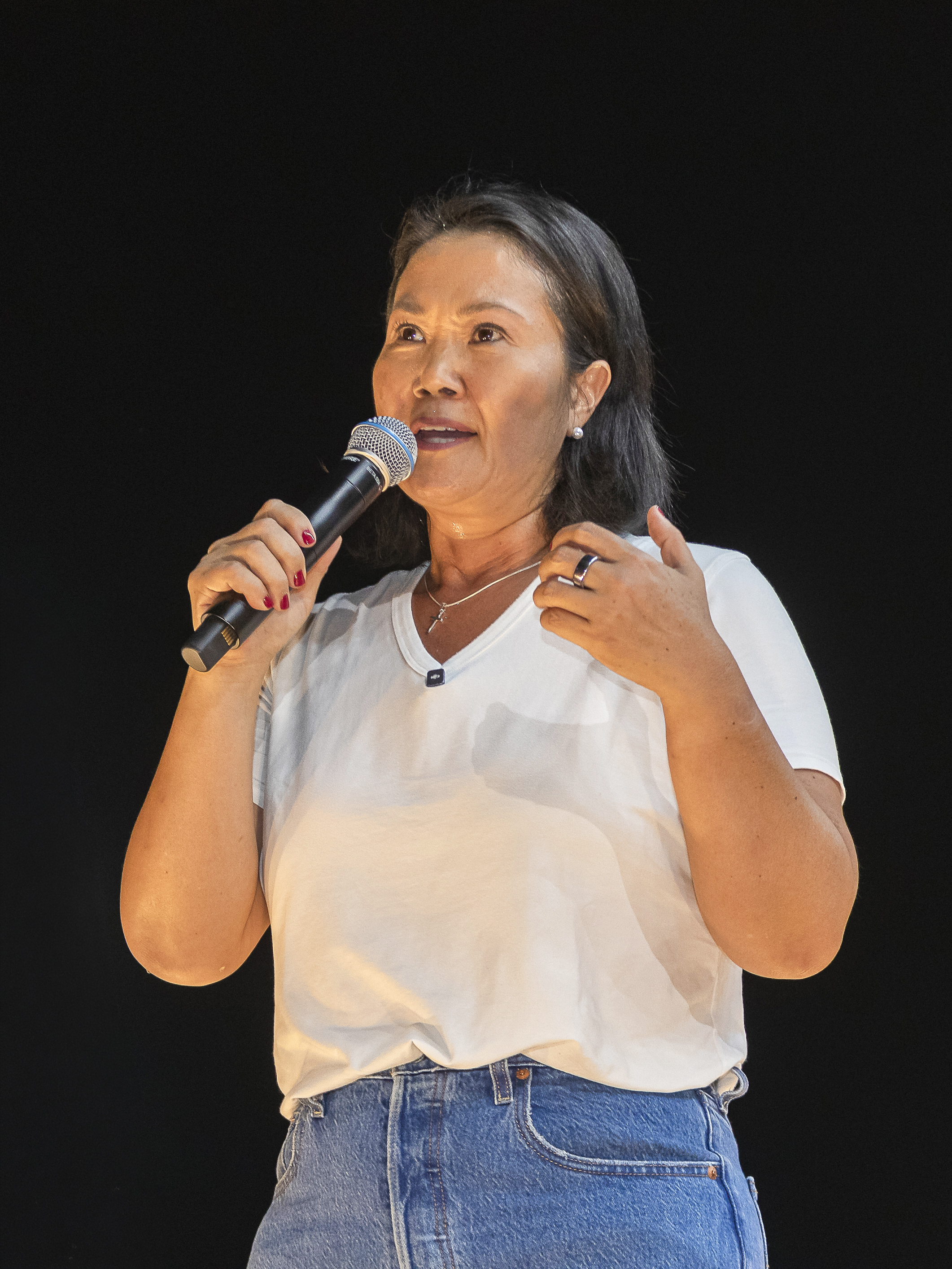
Fujimori speaks in Piura during her closing rally of the first round of the 2026 Peruvian general election

=== First round ===
The first round, held 12–13 April with a field of 35 candidates, was disrupted by delayed delivery of electoral materials that kept dozens of polling stations from opening, prompting an unprecedented one-day extension of voting in Lima and abroad; the ensuing review of thousands of disputed tally sheets slowed the count for weeks and contributed to the 21 April resignation of the head of the National Office of Electoral Processes (ONPE). Fujimori, who had trailed Rafael López Aliaga in most pre-election polling, finished first with 17.18% of valid votes (about 2.88 million). Roberto Sánchez of the left-wing Together for Peru — a congressman, former trade minister under Pedro Castillo, and Castillo's endorsed successor — rose from sixth place in early tabulation to take second with 12.03%, edging López Aliaga by roughly 21,000 votes.

López Aliaga refused to accept the result, alleging fraud in the count and calling for the election's annulment and, at one point, for "insurgency"; European Union observers and Peruvian authorities reported no significant irregularities, and the JNE ruled against annulment on 24 April, confirming the 7 June runoff. He subsequently declined to endorse Fujimori. With more than 70% of first-round voters having backed neither finalist, both campaigns entered the runoff needing broad coalitions.

=== Runoff campaign ===
The runoff, which press coverage widely framed as a contest between two competing visions of the country, pitted Fujimori's law-and-order and pro-market platform against Sánchez's proposals for a new constitution, anti-poverty programs, police reform, and a pardon for the imprisoned Castillo. Fujimori led opinion polls throughout the inter-round period, though the final Ipsos survey before the vote showed a statistical tie. She warned that a Sánchez victory would produce a "failed socialist state", while Sánchez moderated his economic platform in the campaign's final week as part of an alliance with several first-round parties.

Anti-Fujimorist mobilization recurred for a third consecutive cycle, with thousands marching in Lima in the final days under the slogan "Keiko no va". Days before the vote, fourteen former Latin American presidents, including Iván Duque and Felipe Calderón, issued a letter endorsing her defense of the market economy. The candidates met in a televised debate in Lima on 31 May.

=== Count and result ===
The count after the 7 June vote extended over 22 days as contested and observed ballots were scrutinized. Fujimori led early tabulation, was overtaken by Sánchez as rural returns — his strongest territory — arrived, then regained the lead as overseas ballots were incorporated. ONPE completed the tally on 29 June: Fujimori won 50.14% (9,223,396 votes) to Sánchez's 49.87% (9,173,755), a margin of 49,641 votes out of more than 18 million cast — narrower than her own defeats in 2016 and 2021. Sánchez prevailed among voters inside Peru by roughly 32,000 votes; the outcome was decided by the diaspora, where Fujimori took about 63% of ballots, including roughly three-quarters of the vote among Peruvians in the United States.

The victory made Fujimori the first woman elected president of Peru and returned Fujimorism to the presidency 25 years after her father's government collapsed. The JNE's formal proclamation was scheduled for 3 July 2026, with inauguration set for 28 July before the newly bicameral Congress for the 2026–2031 term.

=== Disputes and reactions ===
Sánchez refused to recognize the result, alleging that a late decision to transport overseas tally sheets physically to Lima rather than digitizing them compromised the count, and sought annulment of voting at 119 consular offices; multiple outlets reported that he presented no evidence of manipulation. The JNE rejected his party's appeals to annul more than 2,300 overseas voting tables as unfounded, JNE president Roberto Burneo stated the election proceeded normally, and observer missions from the Organization of American States and the European Union reported no significant irregularities. Sánchez called protests and announced further legal action, including a possible appeal to the inter-American human-rights system; electoral lawyers cited in press coverage noted the JNE's final ruling is unappealable. Reporting by Ojo Público had earlier found that digitization of overseas tally sheets failed in at least 17 countries during the first round, the procedural backdrop to the second-round dispute.

Fujimori refrained from declaring victory before the proclamation, saying she awaited it with "humility, prudence and responsibility" and pledging to unite a country she described as split in two. She was congratulated by right-leaning regional leaders including Javier Milei of Argentina, by OAS secretary general Albert Ramdin, and by the United States State Department, which said it looked forward to cooperation on security, trade, and investment. Analysts at the Atlantic Council and InSight Crime observed that the narrow margin left her without a broad mandate to confront the extortion epidemic, illegal gold mining, and a fragmented legislature, and that the result reflected the same urban–rural and class cleavages that had defined her previous runoffs. As of early July 2026, the proclamation and Sánchez's residual legal challenges remained pending, and post-proclamation developments should be updated as they occur.

== Electoral performance and analysis ==
Fujimori is the only candidate in modern Peruvian history to reach four consecutive presidential runoffs, with each result narrower than most of its predecessors: defeats by roughly 448,000 votes (2011), 41,000 (2016), and 44,000 (2021), followed by a victory of roughly 50,000 votes (2026). Her electoral geography remained broadly stable across the four races: strongest support in Lima's middle class, the business community, northern coastal departments, and — decisively in 2026 — the Peruvian diaspora, against persistent opposition in the rural southern Andes.

Political analysts have consistently identified an "anti-Fujimorist" bloc — voters opposed to her candidacy in principle, largely over her father's record — as the structural constraint on her candidacies. Its expressions included the "No a Keiko" marches of more than 50,000 people in 2016, "would never vote for her" polling of 63% at the outset of the 2021 race, and runoff coalitions in which left-wing leaders endorsed her right-of-center opponents. Commentary on the 2026 race framed the runoff as a test of whether fear of insecurity and instability had finally outweighed resistance to the Fujimori name; analysts at the Atlantic Council concluded after her victory that the near-even split gave her no broad mandate.

== Positioning on Alberto Fujimori's legacy ==
Her father's government (1990–2000) — credited by supporters with defeating the Shining Path insurgency and stabilizing the economy, and condemned by courts and human-rights bodies for corruption and grave abuses — was the central reference point of all four campaigns, but Fujimori's handling of it shifted markedly between cycles.

In 2011 she defended his government's record while attributing its crimes principally to Vladimiro Montesinos and pledging not to pardon him. In 2016 she went furthest in separation: she signed a public pledge against authoritarian practices, endorsed the Truth and Reconciliation Commission's findings for the first time, and promised reparations to victims of forced sterilizations. In 2021 she reversed course, promising a pardon, describing his rule as authoritarian in moments but not a dictatorship, and citing a personal reconciliation with him. By 2026 — after his 2017 pardon by Kuczynski, its 2018 annulment, his 2023 release, an abortive 2024 candidacy announced by Keiko herself, and his death in September 2024 — she campaigned openly on continuity with his security and economic record, invoking his anti-terrorism legacy in her "mano dura" platform. Scholars of Fujimorist party organization have traced these shifts to the underlying tension, present since the party's 2008 founding, between "albertista" loyalists and "keikista" modernizers.

== Campaign finance investigations ==
Allegations of irregular financing accompanied every campaign, escalating from the 2006 drug-linked donations acknowledged in 2011 and the Ramírez affair that damaged the 2016 runoff to the Odebrecht-related Cocktails Case (2018–2026), described in the sections above. Viewed across the cycle, scholars have treated the cases less as discrete scandals than as a sustained contest between prosecutors and Fujimori's congressional power: Baraybar and Gonzalez-Ocantos present the legislative shielding of Fujimori as a paradigm of backlash against anti-corruption judicialization in Latin America, and IDL-Reporteros reported that the Fujimorist-led Congress's 2022 replacement of six of seven Constitutional Court judges aligned the court that ultimately annulled her trial with congressional interests. The case's dismissal in January 2026 immediately preceded, and enabled, her fourth candidacy.

== Electoral fraud allegations ==
Disputed-result claims recurred across the cycle, on both sides. Fujimori and allies alleged manipulation after the 2016 defeat, and after the 2021 runoff she made fraud claims that international observers rejected as unsubstantiated and that commentators in The Washington Post and The Atlantic compared to Donald Trump's efforts to overturn the 2020 U.S. election; her party's legal effort sought to nullify hundreds of thousands of predominantly rural votes. In 2026 the direction reversed: López Aliaga alleged fraud in the first-round count that eliminated him, and Sánchez refused to recognize Fujimori's runoff victory, challenging the overseas ballots that decided it. In each instance, electoral authorities and international observer missions found the elections consistent with international standards and the specific claims unsupported by evidence.

== Election performance ==
Year	Type	Party	Main opponent	Party	Votes for Fujimori			Result
Year	Type	Party	Main opponent	Party	Total	%	Plc.	Result
2011	General	Force 2011	Ollanta Humala	Peru Wins	3,449,595	23.55	2nd	Runoff
2011	Runoff	Force 2011	Ollanta Humala	Peru Wins	7,490,647	48.55	2nd	Lost
2016	General	Popular Force	Pedro Pablo Kuczynski	Peruvians for Change	6,115,073	39.86	1st	Runoff
2016	Runoff	Popular Force	Pedro Pablo Kuczynski	Peruvians for Change	8,555,880	49.88	2nd	Lost
2021	General	Popular Force	Pedro Castillo	Free Peru	1,930,762	13.41	2nd	Runoff
2021	Runoff	Popular Force	Pedro Castillo	Free Peru	8,792,117	49.87	2nd	Lost
2026	General	Popular Force	Roberto Sánchez	Together for Peru	2,877,678	17.18	1st	Runoff
2026	Runoff	Popular Force	Roberto Sánchez	Together for Peru	9,223,396	50.13	1st	Won

== See also ==
- Fujimorism
- Popular Force
- Odebrecht scandal

== Bibliography ==
- Baraybar Hidalgo, Viviana; Gonzalez-Ocantos, Ezequiel (2022). "Prosecutorial Agency, Backlash and Resistance in the Peruvian Chapter of Lava Jato". In Botero, Sandra; Brinks, Daniel; Gonzalez-Ocantos, Ezequiel (eds.). The Limits of Judicialization: From Progress to Backlash in Latin America. New York: Cambridge University Press. ISBN 9781009098342.
- Carrión, Julio F. (2006). The Fujimori Legacy: The Rise of Electoral Authoritarianism in Peru. University Park: Pennsylvania State University Press. ISBN 978-0271027487.
- Meléndez, Carlos, ed. (2016). Anticandidatos: el thriller político de las elecciones 2016 (in Spanish). Lima: Planeta Perú. ISBN 978-612-319-066-8.
- Vásquez de Velasco, Valerie; Lira, Ariana; Llanos, Beatriz; Huertas, Mabel (2020). Señora K: ni víctima, ni heroína [Madame K: Neither victim nor heroine]. Colección Segunda vuelta (in Spanish) (Primera edición ed.). Lima: Página Once. ISBN 978-612-48188-6-8.
