= Reategui =

Reategui or Reátegui is a surname. Notable people with the surname include:

- Anthony Reategui, American poker player
- Javier Reátegui (born 1944), Peruvian politician
- Rolando Reátegui (born 1959), Peruvian entrepreneur and politician
- Eduardo Reátegui, Peruvian scientist and entrepreneur
