= President Fujimori =

President Fujimori may refer to:

- Alberto Fujimori (1938–2024) President of Peru from 1990 until 2000
- Keiko Fujimori (born 1975) President of Peru since 2026
