= José Chlimper =

Peruvian banker and politician

Secretary General of Popular Force
- In office 13 February 2018 – 22 October 2018
- President: Keiko Fujimori
- Preceded by: Joaquín Ramírez
- Succeeded by: Luz Salgado

Member of the Central Reserve Bank of Peru Board of Directors
- In office 16 November 2016 – 18 November 2021
- Appointed by: Congress of the Republic
- In office 6 September 2006 – 2 October 2011
- Appointed by: Alan García

Minister of Agriculture
- In office 28 July 2000 – 25 November 2000
- President: Alberto Fujimori
- Prime Minister: Federico Salas
- Preceded by: Belisario de las Casas Piedra
- Succeeded by: Carlos Amat y León

Lima City Councillor
- In office 1 January 1996 – 31 December 1998

Personal details
- Born: José Chlimper Ackerman; 12 June 1955 (age 71) Lima, Peru
- Party: Cambio 90-New Majority (before 2010); Popular Force (2010–present)
- Education: National University of Engineering (did not graduate); North Carolina State University
- Occupation: Businessman; banker; economist; politician

José Chlimper Ackerman (born June 12, 1955) is a Peruvian banker and politician.

In 1996, he was elected alderman of the Metropolitan Municipality of Lima, and served one term, ending in 1998. From 28 July 2000 to 25 November 2000, he served as Minister of Agriculture of Peru during the third presidency of Alberto Fujimori. From 2006 until 2011, he was member of the board of directors of the Central Reserve Bank of Peru during the second presidency of Alan García. He was reelected to the board starting his second term in 2016 under the presidency of Pedro Pablo Kuczynski.

He was the Popular Force nominee for first vice president in the 2016 election, running with Keiko Fujimori, the nominee for president but the ticket lost to Pedro Pablo Kuczynski.

== Early life and education ==
Chlimper Ackerman was born on 12 June 1955 in Lima, Peru. His parents, José Chlimper and Celia Ackerman Ghitis, were Jews of German descent.

Chilmper began his studies at St. Margaret School in Lima, where he was in the same class as Congressman Daniel Abugattás. For secondary school, he attended Colegio León Pinelo in Lima. He attended the National University of Engineering in Lima from 1973 to 1975, but left before graduating. From 1975 to 1977, he attended North Carolina State University in the United States, where he earned a bachelor's degree in economics and business administration.

== Business career ==
From 1981 to 1986, Chlimper was director of the National Association of Pharmaceutical Laboratories, and from 1985 to 1997 was chairman of the board of Roemmers Laboratories. From 1986 to 1990, he was president of the Association of Pharmaceutical Industries of National Origin, and from 1989 to 1990, was a member of the directing council of the Institute of Industrial Technological Research and Technical Standards. From 1991 to 1998, he was director of the National Society of Industries, in 1992 was president of the Annual Conference of Executives, and in 1992 was vice president of the Latin American Association of Pharmaceutical Industries.

From 1993 to 1994, Chlimper was Secretary of the Peruvian Institute of Business Administration. From 1993 to 1997, he was on the Advisory Committee of the Ministry of Labour and Promotion of Employment. From 1997 to 2006, he was chairman of the board of the Drokasa Agricultural Society. In 1998, he was vice president and treasurer of the Peruvian Federation of Equestrian Sports. In 2000, he was chairman of the board of Agroindustrial Laboratories and president of the Fund of the Americas.

Today, Chlimper holds leadership positions in numerous corporations and organizations in Peru. He is chairman of the board of Peru Airports since 2007, and chairman of the board of Graña y Montero Data since 2006. He is a member of the Chilean Peruvian Business Council since 2005, member of the Chinese Peruvian Business Committee since 2006, and member of the advisory board of the Faculty of Agricultural Business at the University of the Pacific in Lima.

== Political career ==
In 1996, he was elected alderman of the Metropolitan Municipality of Lima as a member of the Fujimorist party Cambio 90-New Majority and served one term, ending in 1998.

From 28 July 2000 to 25 November 2000, he served as Minister of Agriculture of Peru during the third term of President of Alberto Fujimori. From 2006 until 2011, he was president of the Central Reserve Bank of Peru during the second presidency of Alan García.

=== 2016 presidential election ===
Chlimper was the Popular Force nominee for the first vice presidency in the 2016 Peruvian presidential election, running with Keiko Fujimori, the nominee for president. In addition to being a part of the unsuccessful ticket, he was also the largest financier of the campaign. Since 2016, he is a member of the Central Reserve Bank of Peru.

== Personal life ==
Chlimper is Jewish, and has been married to Thais Céliz since 1977. They have four children: Adam, an engineer, Thalia, a psychologist, Aaron, a chef, and Yoel, an economist, and two grandchildren: Zoe and Rambito.

== Electoral history ==
1995 Lima municipal elections

- José Chlimper Ackerman

Peruvian presidential election, 2016

- Pedro Pablo Kuczynski/Martín Vizcarra/Mercedes Aráoz - 8,596,937
- Keiko Fujimori/José Chlimper Ackerman/Vladimiro Huaroc - 8,555,880

== See also ==
- Ministry of Agriculture (Peru)
