= Mark Villanella =

Peruvian-American businessman and media personality

- Born: Mark Vito Villanella; August 10, 1976 (age 50); Berkeley Heights, New Jersey, U.S.
- Citizenship: United States • Peru
- Education: Columbia University
- Spouse: Keiko Fujimori (m. 2004; div. 2022)
- Children: 2

Mark Vito Villanella (born August 10, 1976) is an American-Peruvian businessman and media personality who is known for his past marriage to Peru's president, Keiko Fujimori. He is the founder of the Peruvian real estate company MVV Bienes y Raíces.

== Biography ==
=== Early life ===
Mark Vito Villanella was born on August 10, 1976, in Berkeley Heights, New Jersey, United States to an Italian-American father, and he grew up in the United States.

On July 13, 2004, he married Peruvian-Japanese politician Keiko Fujimori at the Virgen de Fátima Church, located in the district of Miraflores. With Fujimori, he had two daughters during their marriage: Kyara Villanella, born in 2007, who works as an internet celebrity and model, and Kaori Villanella, born in 2009. Their marriage ended in 2022.

He graduated from Columbia University in the United States with a degree in business administration. After moving to Peru in 2003, he founded the real estate company MVV Bienes y Raíces, created in 2014.

Before settling permanently in Peru, he previously worked for IBM Corporation at its New York office between 2005 and 2011. He also founded the company MNG Transportes together with Nikola Seremet, although he later withdrew from that company in 2013.

=== Legal problems in the Cócteles case ===
Because of his links to the Fujimori family, he was accused together with his ex-wife of money laundering and illicit enrichment in the Cócteles case, during the campaign for the 2011 general elections. He was also investigated in 2015 for the purchase of land in Chilca and Cieneguilla. By 2018, Villanella declared a monthly salary account of S/20,000 as owner of MVV Bienes y Raíces. According to statements by prosecutor and lawyer José Domingo Pérez, Villanella obtained between 2014 and 2018, raising the sum of 2.2 million dollars as owner of that company, and also received US$80,000 in cash from Grupo Rasmuss. Among Villanella's clients, there would allegedly be links to the Fujimori family.

In 2019, the Second National Appeals Chamber, headed by Judge César Sahuanay, annulled the ban preventing him from leaving the country. That same year, after Keiko Fujimori's detention, he went on hunger strike outside the Chorrillos women's prison, citing “serious violations of due process” against his partner. By July 2020, Villanella's company had not generated real estate income. According to statements by his lawyer, Villanella was accused because he was Keiko Fujimori's husband, and it is claimed that he was not involved in money laundering.

Fujimori and Villanella divorced in 2022.

On May 30, 2023, a ruling imposed a ban preventing him from leaving Peruvian territory, together with his ex-wife and engineer and politician Jaime Yoshiyama, for a period of 36 months, in connection with the Cócteles case.

In January 2026, Judge Wilson Verástegui of the Tenth National Preparatory Investigation Court determined that Villanella would remain under investigation over the purchase of real estate in 2015.

=== Career as a television personality ===
After his separation from Keiko Fujimori, Villanella announced in 2023 that he was withdrawing from his links to Peruvian politics in order to focus on his role as an internet celebrity, TikTok content creator, and figure in Peruvian show business. That same year, he appeared in the music video for the song "La pituca en ingles," inspired by the original song performed by Tongo and interpreted by Cint G., the daughter of the aforementioned singer. He was also invited that year to the American Television show "Esto es guerra", as aprt of the segment "Sazon en guerra". He was linked to Susy Diaz, who reportedly saw him naked in a shower without any intimate interaction. Later, he became the partner of Sofia Chirinos, a law student at the Female University "Universitdad Femenina del Sagrado Corazon", whom he kissed at the start of Fujimori's trial. Previously, both Villanella and Chirinos have been captured by the cameras of the entertainment program Magaly TB, la firme when he took her to his house.

In 2025, he participated in the Peruvian film Tierra negra, alongside Zully Pinchi. At the beginning of that year, he revealed that he had separated from Chirinos, describing the breakup as friendly and without conflict. In March, he was a special guest at the birthday celebration of vedette Deisy Araujo. In April, he began a relationship with businesswoman Leslie Echavarría, revealing it through an Instagram post, which led Keiko Fujimori to congratulate him on his new commitment. At the beginning of his relationship, and before the program Magaly TV, la firme aired a video showing him entering a hotel, he decided to tell his partner what had happened. After that, the relationship continued. Later, he began working for Only One Coin, his partner's company, where he took on the role of English teacher. In November, Echavarría announced the end of the relationship after Susy Díaz said she had seen him naked; however, it was later discovered that it was a couple's joke, and they reconciled with prospects of an upcoming wedding.

In 2026, he was announced as part of the main cast of the reality show La Granja VIP Perú on Panamericana Televisión. At the start of the reality show, he was accompanied by Echavarría and his daughter Kyara Villanella. For her part, Keiko Fujimori called him to wish him success on the program.
