= Fundación por los Niños del Perú =

Former Peruvian charitable foundation

The Fundación por los Niños del Perú (transl. Foundation for the Children of Peru) was a Peruvian charitable foundation focused on supporting vulnerable children, founded in 1985 by the then First Lady of Peru, Pilar Nores. Until its dissolution in 2011, the foundation's presidency was held by the spouse of the President of the Republic of Peru.

== History ==
After the start of Alan García's government, his wife, Pilar Nores, decided to create the Foundation for the Children of Peru, with the aim of helping Peruvian children, who were greatly affected at that time by the Shining Path insurgency.

In 1990, Nores handed over the position to Susana Higuchi, who was tasked with increasing the number of children's villages. In 1994, her daughter Keiko Fujimori assumed the presidency of the foundation after Higuchi divorced Alberto Fujimori. Under Keiko Fujimori's leadership, the number of children's villages increased to 28.

In 2005, the Golden Hearts campaign was launched, which received funding support from Intralot. Its music video was filmed by Percy Céspedez.

In 2011, the foundation was put into liquidation because it had become unable to continue fulfilling its child-welfare purpose, amid administrative, financial, and asset-management problems.

== Presidency ==
Chairwoman	Government	Duration	
Pilar Nores	First presidency of Alan García	1985	1990
Susana Higuchi	Presidency of Alberto Fujimori	1990	1994
Keiko Fujimori	Presidency of Alberto Fujimori	1994	2000
Nilda Jara	Presidency of Valentín Paniagua	2000	2001
Eliane Karp	Presidency of Alejandro Toledo	2001	2006
Pilar Nores	Second presidency of Alan García	2006	2011
Nadine Heredia	Presidency of Ollanta Humala	2011	2011
