= Universidad Alas Peruanas =

University in Lima, Peru

Alas Peruanas University
- Universidad Alas Peruanas
- Other names: UAP
- Motto: We Form Leaders with Entrepreneurial Vision
- Motto in English: Produce Knowledge
- Type: Private university
- Active: April 26, 1996–2025
- Founders: Fidel Ramírez Prado, Ph.D.
- President: CPC. José Eduardo Castillo Carazas; Executive Chairman, General Manager:
- Rector: Dr. Francisco Luis Pérez Expósito
- Location: Jr. Cayetano Heredia Nº 1092, Jesús María, Lima, Peru; 12°4′10″S 77°3′5″W
- Campus: Urban
- Colors: Granate; Black; White
- Nickname: UAP
- Mascot: Marine Eagle (Mochica Culture)
- Website: www.uap.edu.pe

Universidad Alas Peruanas (UAP or Peruvian Wings University) was a university located in Lima, Peru, founded on April 26, 1996, through the Alas Peruanas Cooperative, which was composed of members of the Peruvian Armed Forces. It was later managed by Peruvian politician Joaquín Ramírez.

In January 2014, the school launched UAPSat-1, a satellite that monitors the environment outside the Earth's atmosphere aboard the Cygnus CRS Orb-1 mission.

Following a long license denial process by SUNEDU, the university permanently ceased operations in 2025.

== History ==
The creation of the Alas Peruanas University was the idea of Fidel Ramírez Prado (Doctor of Education from the National University of San Marcos, with specialization courses in Spain, Canada, the United States, Panama, Israel, England and Mexico), who in March 1989 received the support of the delegates of the Alas Peruanas Cooperative General Assembly to proceed with such an ambitious project. After almost seven years and long periods of paperwork, on April 26, 1996, by Resolution No. 102 the creation of the Universidad Alas Peruanas was authorised. Its first Rector was Mr. Fidel Ramírez Prado. The Universidad Alas Peruanas opened on June 1, 1996, with five professional courses in the Jesús María district. At present, it has 20 national branches and 34 professional courses of studies.

== Alas Peruanas International ==
The Universidad Alas Peruanas promotes the exchange of knowledge and research at the international level in all its academic areas at undergraduate and graduate levels as well as for its teaching staff. The aim is to create and multiply relations with foreign institutions, among others:

- Universidad Estatal del Valle de Ecatepec (UNEVE).
- Universidad de Mendoza – Argentina.
- Universidad del Golfo México.

== University Directory ==
Mg. Martín Antonio Campos Parodi	CHAIRMAN
Dr. Aguilar Bailón de la Cruz	DIRECTOR
Lic. Raúl Tomas Pinto Rodríguez	DIRECTOR
Dr. Enrique Marvel Tasayco Monje	DIRECTOR
Dr. Lautaro Román Castillo	DIRECTOR
Dr. Jorge Luis Picon Gonzales	DIRECTOR
Mg. Juan Carlos Homa Tong	DIRECTOR
Lic. Nazario Muchotrigo Matías	DIRECTOR
Lic. Esteban Ydelfonso Matias Loza	DIRECTOR

== University Authorities ==
Cpc.José E. Castillo Carazas

- CEO

Dr. Francisco Luis Pérez Expósito

- Rector

Dr. Ricardo Díaz Bazán, Ph.D.

- Academic Vice-Rector – Vice-Rector of Research, Innovation and Entrepreneurship

Oscar Lagravère Von Massenbach, Ph.D.

- Dean, School of Engineering and Architecture

Oswaldo J. Vasquez Cerna, Ph.D.

- Dean, School of Business Sciences and Education

Dr. Iván M. Vojvodic Hernández

- Dean, School of Medicine and Health Sciences

Dr. Jesús M. Galarza Orrilla

- Dean, School of Law and Political Sciences

Mg. Walter R. Tasayco Alcántara

- Dean. School of Agricultural Sciences

== Schools and Courses ==
Schools	Course of Studies
School of Agricultural Sciences	Professional School of Veterinary Medicine
School of Business Sciences	Professional School of Administration and International Business
School of Business Sciences	Professional School of Tourism, Hospitality and Gastronomy
School of Business Sciences	Professional School of Economics
School of Business Sciences	Professional School of Accounting and Financial Sciences
School of Communication Sciences, Education and Humanities	Professional School of Communication Sciences
School of Communication Sciences, Education and Humanities	Professional School of Education
School of Communication Sciences, Education and Humanities	Professional School of Sports Sciences
School of Law and Political Science	Law
School of Engineering and Architecture
School of Engineering and Architecture	Professional School of Architecture
School of Engineering and Architecture	Professional School of Mining Engineering
School of Engineering and Architecture	Professional School of Civil Engineering
School of Engineering and Architecture	Systems and Information Technology
School of Engineering and Architecture	Electronic Engineering and Telecommunications
School of Engineering and Architecture	Professional School of Aeronautical Engineering
School of Engineering and Architecture	Professional School of Industrial Engineering
School of Engineering and Architecture	Professional School of Mechanic Engineering
School of Engineering and Architecture	Professional School of Environmental Engineering
School of Human Medicine and Health Sciences	Professional School of Estomatología
School of Human Medicine and Health Sciences	Professional School of Enfermería
School of Human Medicine and Health Sciences	Professional School of Pharmacy and Biochemistry
School of Human Medicine and Health Sciences	Professional School of Human Medicine
School of Human Medicine and Health Sciences	Professional School of Human Nutrition
School of Human Medicine and Health Sciences	Professional School of Obstetrics
School of Human Medicine and Health Sciences	Professional School of Human Psychology
School of Human Medicine and Health Sciences	Professional School of Medical Technology

== Graduate school ==
Master's Degree

Business and Administration Sciences	Master in Administration and Business Supervision
Business and Administration Sciences	Master in Public Administration and Government Control
Business and Administration Sciences	Master in Regional and Local Public Administration
Business and Administration Sciences	Master in Building and Real Estate Administration
Business and Administration Sciences	Master in Taxation and International Auditing
Business and Administration Sciences	Master in Governability and Public Administration
Business and Administration Sciences	Master in Regional and Local Governments
Health Sciences	Master in Occupational Health
Health Sciences	Master in Public Health with a major in Health Services Management
Law and Political Sciences	Civil Law
Law and Political Sciences	Master in Constitutional Law and Human Rights
Law and Political Sciences	Master in Notarial and Registration Law
Law and Political Sciences	Master in Criminal Law
Engineering	Master in Civil Engineering with a major in Hydraulics and Environment
Engineering	Master in Industrial Engineering
Engineering	Master in Systems Engineering with a major in Business and Institutions Administration
Engineering	Master in Environmental Management and Sustainable Development
Engineering	Master in Mining and Environment

== Second specialization ==
Nursing	Second Specialization in Surgical Centre Nursing
Nursing	with major in Dialysis
Nursing	Second Specialization in Nurse Care at Emergency and Disasters
Pharmacy and Biochemistry	Second Specialization in Clinical Pharmacy and Pharmaceutical Care
Human Medicine	Second Specialization in Administration and Health Services Management
Human Medicine	Second Specialization in Public and Community Health with major in Family Healthcare
Psychology	Second Specialization in Forensic Psychology
Psychology	Second Specialization in Educational Psychology
Psychology	Second Specialization in Systemic Family Psychotherapy
Obstetrics	Second Specialization in High Risk Obstetrics
Obstetrics	Second Specialization in Emergencies and Critical Care in Obstetrics
Obstetrics	Second Specialization in Foetal Monitoring And Diagnostic Imaging in Obstetrics

== Alas Peruanas Network ==
University

With headquarters in the city of Lima, it also has several branches and Decentralized Academic Units throughout the country.

The Alas Peruanas Cooperative

The savings and credit-type cooperative was set up on December 14, 1968, and officially recognized by Resolution No. 053-69 of the National Institute of Cooperatives (INCOOP) on March 11, 1969, and duly registered in Lima's Public Registry on Volume I, Entry 1 Folio 429, in accordance with Legislative Decree No. 085, obtaining its compliance certification from the INCOOP on July 7, 1982, having been registered on Volume II, Entry 5, page 531 of the Cooperatives Records of the Public Registry of Lima. Dr. Fidel Ramírez Prado, currently general manager and rector of the Universidad Alas Peruanas, was the great driving force behind the cooperative for many years, having led it to its present position.

CEPRE UAP

The Pre-University Centre Universidad Alas Peruanas (CEPRE - UAP) is part of the Peruvian University System that offers direct admission to the 6 schools and their 30 courses to students who satisfactorily pass the Admission Course.

Institutes

They are educational institutions of higher education promoted by the Universidad Alas Peruanas, with the purpose of forming technical professionals in accordance with the current Technological Superior Education Institutes and Schools Act (MODULAR system).

== Notable alumni ==
- Liz Benavides (born 1969), lawyer, Peru's attorney general
