= Rolando Reátegui =

Peruvian politician

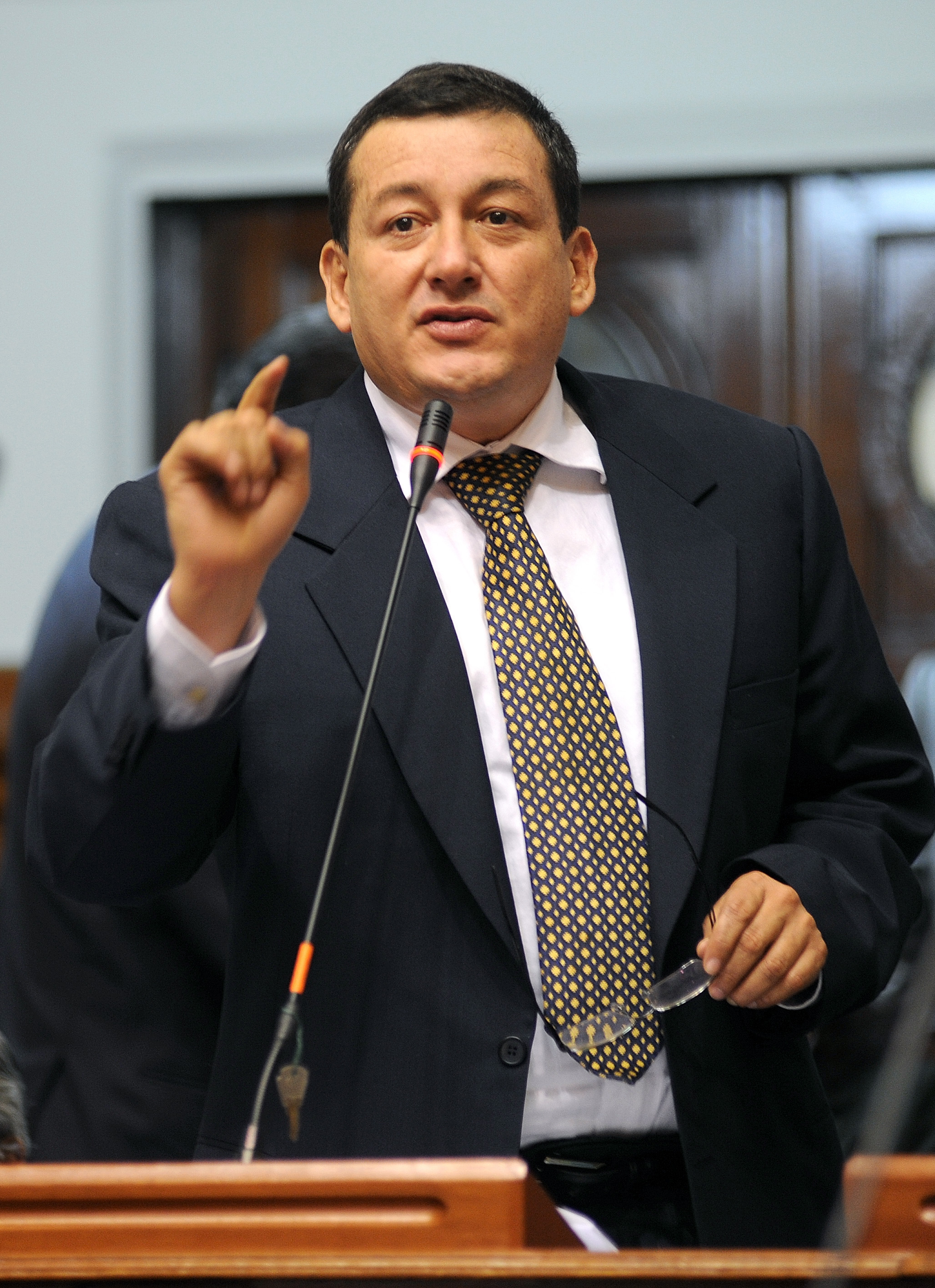
- Reátegui in 2010

Member of Congress
- In office 26 July 2006 – 30 September 2019
- Constituency: San Martín
- In office 26 July 2000 – 26 July 2001
- Constituency: National

Provincial Mayor of San Martín
- In office 1 January 1996 – 31 December 1998

Personal details
- Born: Rolando Reátegui Flores; 19 May 1959 (age 67) Tarapoto, Peru
- Party: Independent
- Other political affiliations: Popular Force; Alliance for the Future; Vamos Vecino; Peru 2000
- Education: University of the Pacific
- Occupation: Politician
- Profession: Entrepreneur

Rolando Reátegui Flores (born 19 May 1959) is a Peruvian entrepreneur and Fujimorist politician who is a former Congressman representing San Martín between 2006 and 2019. He was previously a Congressman between 2000 and 2001, elected under the Peru 2000 coalition. He was also Provincial Mayor of San Martín from 1996 to 1998.

== Early life and education ==
Reátegui was born on 19 May 1959 in Tarapoto and graduated from the University of the Pacific with a license in economics, in 1987.

== Business career ==
In 1991, he opened his own drugstore in Tarapoto, which he still owns and manages and which has developed into a chain of supermarkets since 1998. Moreover, he manages a farm in Peruvian High Amazonia. From 1994 to 1995, he was the president of the chamber of commerce.

== Political career ==
=== Early political career ===
From 1994 to 2000, Reátegui was the provincial chairman of the political movement IDEAS. In 1995, he was elected as mayor of San Martín Province for a three-year term and served from 1996 to 1998. From 1998 to 2002, he was the secretary-general of the Vamos Vecino party, close to then-president Alberto Fujimori.

=== Congressman ===
In 2000, he was elected Congressman under the Fujimorist Peru 2000 coalition for the 2000–2005 term however, the Congress was dissolved early in 2001 due to Fujimori's resignation and Reátegui ran for re-election representing the San Martín Region under the People's Solution alliance, but he lost his seat. In 2006, he ran for Congress once again, this time on the Alliance for the Future coalition, representing the San Martín Region and was elected to Congress, after a five-year absence. He was re-elected for another five-year term, in 2011, under the Force 2011 party, and again in 2016 for another five-year term, now sitting with the Popular Force party however, he quit the party in January 2019, and his term was cut short in 2019, following to the dissolution of the congress by President Martin Vizcarra.
