= Kenji Fujimori =

Peruvian businessman (born 1980)

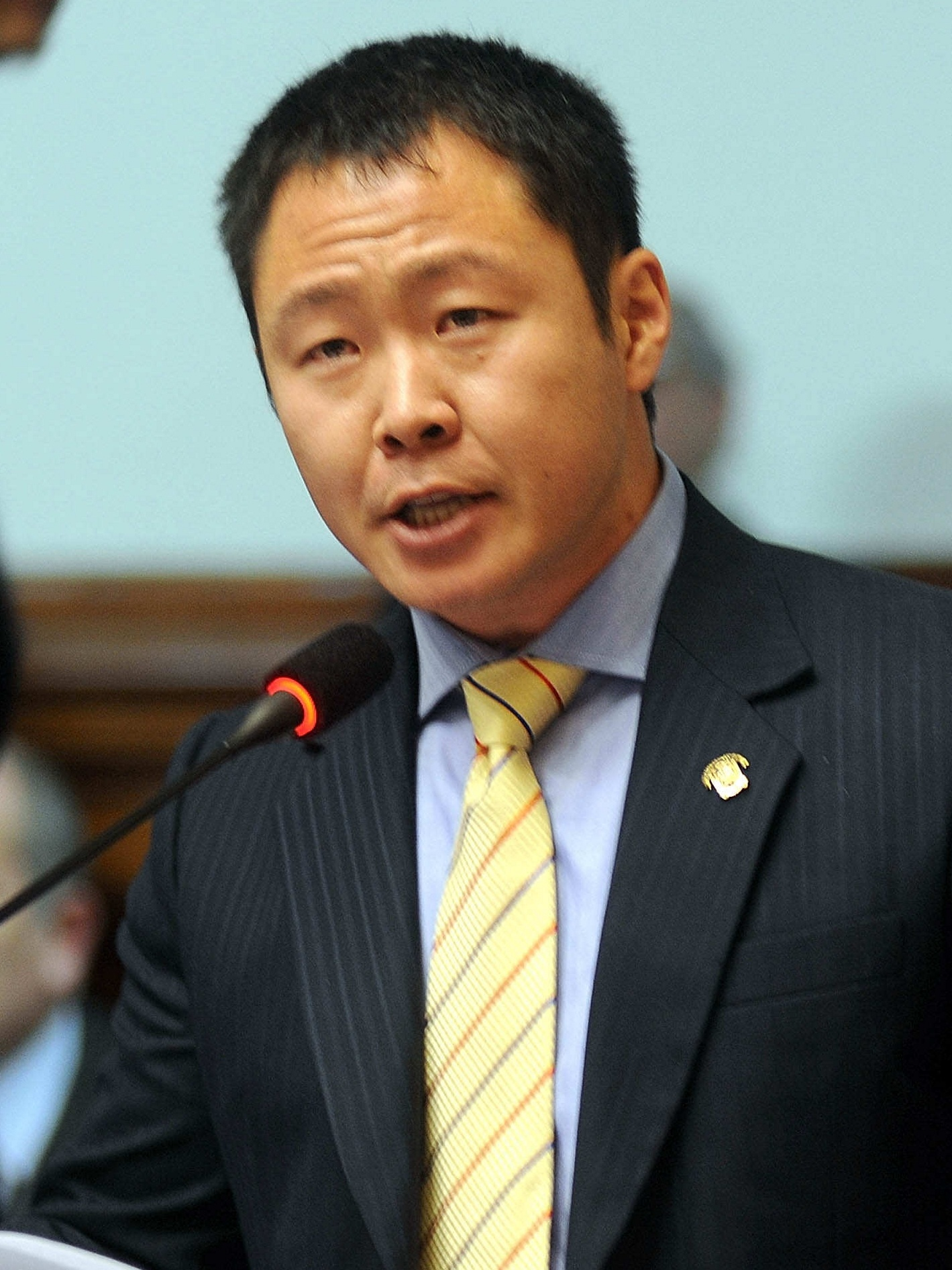
- Fujimori in 2018

Member of Congress
- In office 26 July 2011 – 6 June 2018
- Succeeded by: Ángel Neyra
- Constituency: Lima

Personal details
- Born: Kenji Gerardo Fujimori Higuchi; 19 May 1980 (age 46) Lima, Peru
- Party: Popular Force (2010–2018)
- Other political affiliations: Sí Cumple (2006–2010)
- Spouse: Érika Muñoz Regis (m. 2020)
- Parent(s): Alberto Fujimori; Susana Higuchi
- Relatives: Keiko Fujimori (sister); Santiago Fujimori (uncle)
- Education: Kansas State University (BS)
- Occupation: Politician
- Profession: Businessman

Kenji Gerardo Fujimori Higuchi (Note: Spanish pronunciation: [ˈkeɲɟʝi xeˈɾaɾðo fuxiˈmoɾi]; Japanese: 藤森 健二, romanized: Fujimori Kenji) (born 19 May 1980) is a Peruvian businessman and former politician representing Lima from 2011 until he was suspended from congressional duty in June 2018, in aftermath of the Mamanivideos scandal. He is the son of former President Alberto Fujimori and former First Lady and congresswoman Susana Higuchi. He has three siblings: Hiro Alberto, Sachi Marcela and Keiko Sofía. In the 2011 elections, he ran for Congress in the constituency of Lima, under the Force 2011, a Fujimorist political party led by his sister Keiko, being the most voted congressman in 2011. In the 2016 elections, he was re-elected for a second term to Congress, once again representing the same constituency, under the Popular Force, as he received a high number of votes and being the most voted congressman in 2016. In June 2018, following the scandal, Congress suspended Kenji and two other congressmen of his party for allegations of crimes of influence peddling and bribery. He has since left politics and become a media personality.

== Early life ==
Kenji Fujimori was born on 19 May 1980 to Japanese Peruvian engineers, Alberto Fujimori, at the time dean of the science faculty of the National Agrarian University in Lima, and later President of Peru, and Susana Higuchi. He has three elder siblings. His father won the 1990 presidential elections, implemented portions of Plan Verde and performed the 1992 Peruvian coup d'état where he suspended the constitution, dissolving Congress and the opposition. Kenji's mother soon disagreed with her husband, and they divorced in 1996. After this, Kenji's 19-year-old sister Keiko was named "First Lady of Peru".

During his father's presidency, Kenji was seen as the favorite child of the family, creating some jealousy with his sister Keiko. He would often travel with his father during presidential functions. His father resigned in 2000 after a massive corruption scandal and went to exile in Japan. He was arrested in Chile in 2005, and was extradited to Peru to face trial and was sentenced to jail terms in 2007 and 2009.

== Education ==
From 1999 to 2004, Kenji Fujimori studied agronomics at Kansas State University, graduating with a Bachelor of Science degree. Since 2008, he has been the general manager of a Lima private security and surveillance company. In March 2009, he founded his own enterprise, offering "independent services". Moreover, he holds executive positions in three other companies.

== Political career ==
=== Early political career ===
In the 2006 regional elections, he unsuccessfully ran for Governor of the Lima Region receiving only 3.5% of the popular vote, running under his father's Sí Cumple party. In 2010, he was a founding member of Force 2011, led by his sister. Since March of that year, he has been the national secretary of youth of this party.

=== Congressman ===
In the 2011 elections, he ran for a seat in Congress under the Force 2011 party in the constituency of Lima and he was elected, as he was the most voted congressman in his constituency and served for the 2011–2016 term and was reelected in the 2016 elections for the 2016–2021 term due to a high number of votes and was once again the most voted congressman in his constituency. In June 2018, following to the scandal, Congress suspended Kenji and two other congressmen of his party for alleged crimes of influence peddling and bribery.

==== Pardon of Alberto Fujimori ====
In December 2017, he achieved the long-awaited freedom of his father, Alberto Fujimori, in the middle of an alleged negotiation with President Kuczynski to avoid his vacancy as president of the republic. With this achievement, he managed to get the hard wing of Fujimorism (Albertism) to call him to be the successor of the party and in the face of the continuous electoral failures of his sister, Keiko Fujimori, current leader of the Popular Force who has decided to mark a distance with her brother and their father, losing prominence within his party and with his former followers.

On 31 January 2018, he resigned from the Popular Force party, and on 20 March, he announced the creation of a new political party Cambio 21 (Change 21).

== Controversies ==
=== First impeachment process against Pedro Pablo Kuczynski ===
In December 2017, he and 10 other congressmen from the Popular Force party abstained from voting in favor of the vacancy against President Pedro Pablo Kuczynski, a decision that the Popular Force had agreed to vote in favor unanimously. As the vacancy did not prosper due to the 10 abstention votes, the Popular Force decided to initiate a disciplinary process against them at the beginning of 2018, when Congressman Bienvenido Ramirez was expelled and in a few hours Kenji Fujimori was expelled too, the remaining eight congressmen decided to resign from the party, a decision that had been agreed upon beforehand in the event that one of them was withdrawn from Fuerza Popular.

=== Kenjivideos scandal ===
On 21 March 2018, two days before President Pedro Pablo Kuczynski faced an impeachment process for a second time, a video was released of Kuczynski allies, including his lawyer and Kenji Fujimori, attempting to buy the vote against impeachment from one official. Following the release of the video, Kuczynski presented himself before congress and officially submitted his resignation to the Council of Ministers. In June 2018, following the scandal, Congress suspended Kenji and two other congressmen of his party for alleged crimes of influence peddling and bribery.

In January 2020, prosecutors were seeking a 12-year prison term for former lawmaker Kenji Fujimori on charges of attempting to buy votes in a plot to keep ex-president Pedro Pablo Kuczynski from being impeached.

== Personal life ==
On 30 June 2020, Fujimori married Erika Muñoz Regis.
