= Miki Torres =

Peruvian politician (born 1980)

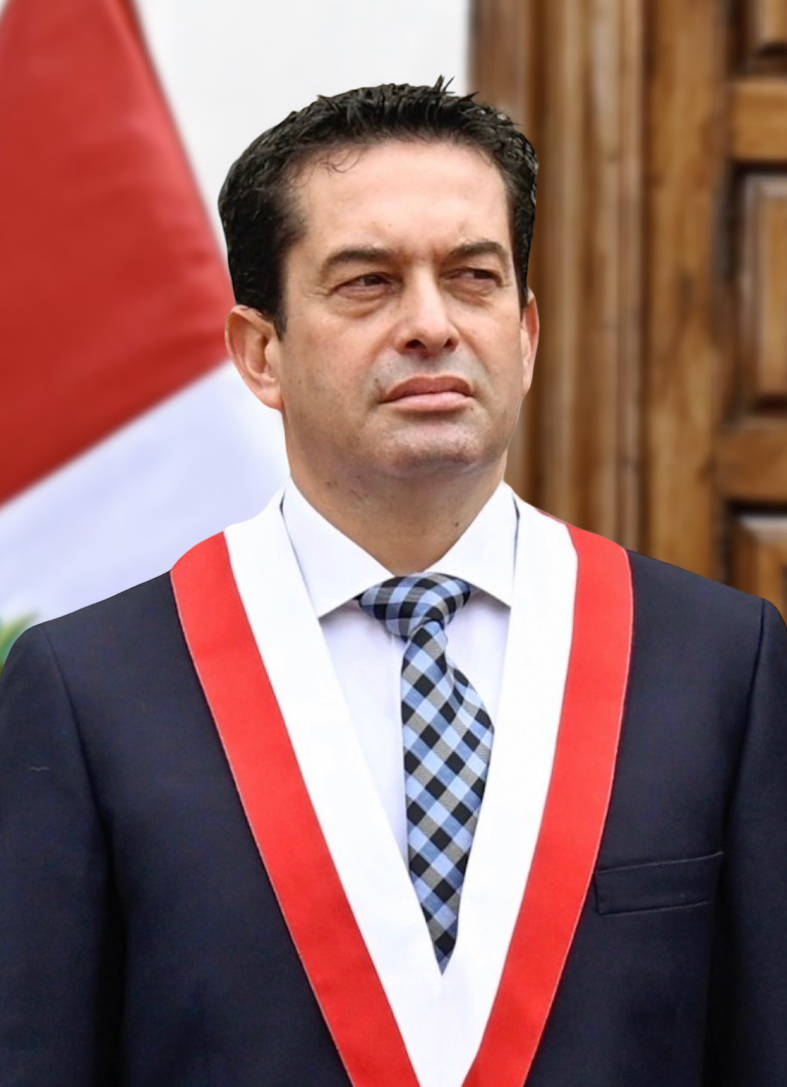
- Torres in 2026

Second Vice President of Peru
- Incumbent
- Assumed office 28 July 2026 Serving with Luis Galarreta
- President: Keiko Fujimori
- Preceded by: Mercedes Aráoz (2020)

President of Congress
- Incumbent
- Assumed office 26 July 2026
- Vice President: 1st Vice President; Alejandro Muñante; 2nd Vice President; Nilza Chacón; 3rd Vice President; Edgar Mancha
- Preceded by: Fernando Rospigliosi (Note: as President of the unicameral Congress of the Republic; President of the Senate position last held in 1992 by Felipe Osterling)

Senator of the Republic
- Incumbent
- Assumed office 26 July 2026
- Constituency: Nationwide

Member of Congress
- In office 26 July 2016 – 16 March 2020
- Constituency: Lima

Personal details
- Born: Miguel Ángel Torres Morales
- Party: Popular Force
- Parent: Carlos Torres y Torres Lara (father)
- Education: University of Lima; University of Piura
- Occupation: Lawyer, politician

Miguel Ángel "Miki" Torres Morales is a Peruvian politician who has served as the Second Vice President of Peru and President of the Congress of the Republic (Note: ex-officio role; as President of the Senate of Peru) since 2026. He is the son of Carlos Torres y Torres Lara, former Prime Minister of Peru. He was elected as the Second Vice President of Peru in 2026, as the running mate of Keiko Fujimori.

== Political career ==
From 2016 to 2020, he was a member of the Congress of the Republic.

Torres was the Popular Force candidate for the Second Vice President of Peru, as well as a candidate for the Senate from the nationwide constituency. Following the first round of voting results in April, Torres was elected to the Senate. He also became Second Vice President following Keiko Fujimori's election as President in the second round.

=== Second vice presidency and presidency of Congress ===
On 17 July 2026, he became the president of the Congressional Preparatory Board as the member of Congress who won the most votes nationwide. On the 26th of the same month, he was nominated as a candidate for the presidency of the Senate, in which, if elected, he would ex-officio serve as the president of the Congress of the Republic. He won 30 votes to Daniel Barragán's 29, with senator Silvana Robles from Together for Peru casting a vitiated ballot, and was elected as the president of Congress. Two days later, he began his tenure as Second Vice President.

== Notes ==
Political offices
Vacant Title last held by Mercedes Aráoz	Second Vice President of Peru; 2026–present	Incumbent
Preceded by Fernando Rospigliosi as President of Congress	President of the Senate; 2026–present	Incumbent
