= Joaquín Ramírez =

Peruvian politician

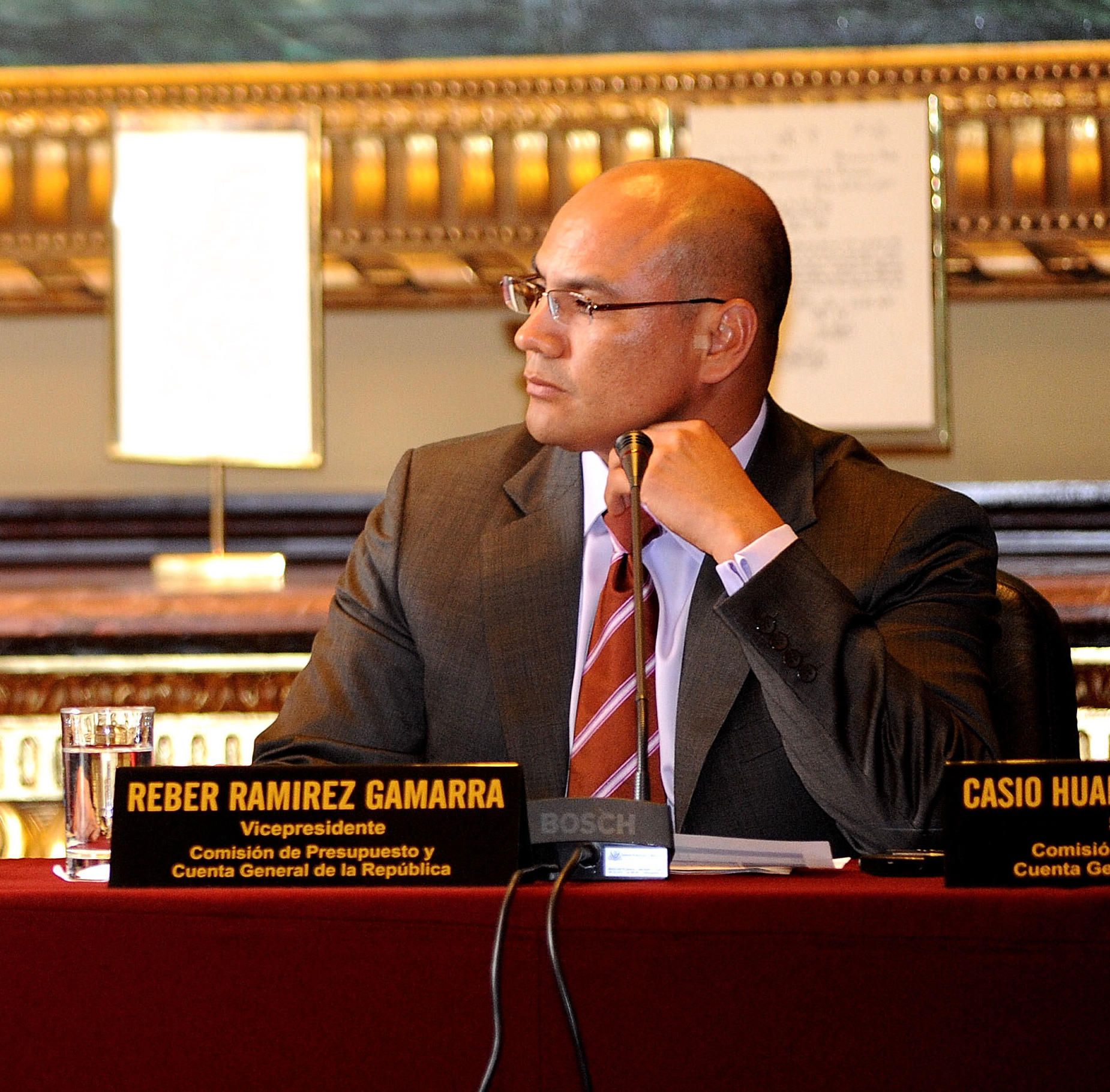
- Ramírez in 2011

Member of Congress
- In office 26 July 2011 – 26 July 2016
- Constituency: Cajamarca

Personal details
- Born: Reber Joaquín Ramírez Gamarra; 7 January 1970 (age 56) Bolivar, Cajamarca, Peru
- Party: Popular Force
- Occupation: Politician
- Profession: Businessman

Reber Joaquín Ramírez Gamarra, formerly known as Reber Ramírez (born 7 January 1970), is a Peruvian businessman and Fujimorist politician, formerly a Congressman representing the Cajamarca Region for the 2011–2016 term.

== Business career ==
He has been engaged in business activities as a shareholder and manager of various companies, primarily in the real estate sector, as well as in the automotive and information technology industries. In 2008, he graduated in business administration from Alas Peruanas University. He also completed postgraduate studies at Atlantic International University between 2009 and 2011.

He is a former president of Carlos A. Mannucci, president of the Universidad Técnica de Cajamarca, a cousin of Willy Ramírez Chavarry, a member of the National Jury of Elections, and the principal financier of Popular Force.

== Political career ==
In the 2011 elections, he ran for Congress, representing the Cajamarca Region under the Force 2011 party of Keiko Fujimori, the daughter of former President Alberto Fujimori and was elected for the 2011–2016 term. He would later become the right-hand man of Keiko Fujimori and Secretary General of the Popular Force political party. He resigned in 2016 amid charges that he was a member of the Untouchables, a Peru-based illegal drug trade gang, along with his uncle Fidel Ramirez (owner of Universidad Alas Peruanas). The organization is allegedly headed by Miguel Arevalo "Eteco" Ramirez.

He has become the main financier of the Popular Force ever since.

== Controversies ==
In 2014, he was denounced by the Asset Laundering Attorney, but being a Congressman of the Republic he had parliamentary immunity, so it was not possible to carry out preliminary investigations to clarify his fortune, which exceeded US$7 million, investigation which also involved his family.

In September 2014, the attorney Julia Príncipe would say: “An unusual increase in the patrimony of Congressman Joaquín Ramírez, from 2003 to date, which was developed mainly in the real estate field through his companies, when in the beginning he only he worked as a public transport collector.”

On 15 May 2016 Univision Noticias issued a report in which an investigation against him initiated for money laundering was attributed, carried out by the DEA -Drug Enforcement Administration- on US$15 million that were delivered to him by Keiko Fujimori.
