= Popular Force =

Peruvian political party

Popular Force Fuerza Popular
- Abbreviation: FP
- President: Keiko Fujimori
- Secretary-General: Luis Galarreta
- Founder: Keiko Fujimori
- Founded: 9 March 2010; 16 years ago
- Preceded by: New Majority
- Headquarters: Lima
- Membership (2026): 62,909
- Ideology: Fujimorism; Conservatism (Peru); Neoliberalism (Peru); Right-wing populism; Anti-communism
- Political position: Right-wing to far-right
- Regional affiliation: Union of Latin American Parties
- Colours: Orange Black
- Chamber of Deputies: 41 / 130
- Senate: 22 / 60
- Governorships: 0 / 25
- Regional Councillors: 1 / 274
- Province Mayorships: 0 / 196
- District Mayorships: 3 / 1,874
- Andean Parliament: 1 / 5

Website
- fuerzapopular.com.pe

Popular Force (Spanish: Fuerza Popular, FP), formerly known as Force 2011 (Spanish: Fuerza 2011) until 2012, is a right-wing populist and Fujimorist political party in Peru. The party is led by incumbent president Keiko Fujimori, the daughter of former president Alberto Fujimori. She ran unsuccessfully for the presidency in the 2011, 2016 and 2021 presidential elections, losing by a narrow margin in all three, before being successful in the 2026 presidential election.

== History ==
Popular Force was formed in 2010 by the merger of the Alliance for the Future coalition, formed in 2005 through the union of the Cambio 90 and New Majority parties, which were created during the government of Alberto Fujimori.

Alliance for the Future ran in the 2006 Peruvian general election; Martha Chávez was chosen to appear for the presidential elections. However, it came in fourth place with 7.44% of the votes cast. On the other hand, it managed to have parliamentary representation with 13 seats, including Keiko Fujimori who obtained the largest vote compared to the other candidates in Lima.

Keiko's role as a congresswoman was moderate since she maintained a dialogue with APRA. In other words, it was a support for the government of the day in various legislative processes. In subsequent years, her role was discreet as she had periods of leave due to her double maternity leave, trips abroad due to representative obligations and to complete her studies abroad. During her presence at the congress, she was head of the commissions for Women and Social Development, Economy, Banking, Finance and Financial Intelligence, Foreign Trade and Tourism, Budget and General Account of the Republic, and Housing and Construction.

On 21 September 2007, Alberto Fujimori was extradited from Chile after the prosecutor of the Chilean Supreme Court, Mónica Maldonado, recommended his extradition for cases of human rights violations and crimes of corruption during his government. In December of the same year, the ruling in the case of former President Alberto Fujimori was handed down in the special court room of the Supreme Court in Lima. Guilt is indicated for the crime of usurpation of functions in the search of the home of former presidential adviser Vladimiro Montesinos when the "Vladi-videos" scandal occurred. Faced with this fact, the court ruled 6 years in prison.

In July 2008, the Fujimorist bloc helped APRA Congressman Javier Velásquez's candidacy for the presidency of the congress. Consequently, the opposition group indicated that this was due to the flexibilities that former president Fujimori received in jail. That same year, Keiko declared her intention to unite all Fujimorists into a single party.

Popular Force is the country’s most powerful and best-structured political force. The party governs Peru from Congress, where it holds a position of strength. It has managed to consolidate its political control by appointing individuals aligned with its interests to head several key institutions, such as the Constitutional Court and the Public Ministry. It has been responsible for the removal of three presidents in ten years. Keiko Fujimori has been its undisputed leader since her brother Kenji Fujimori’s withdrawal from political life and her father’s death in 2024.

=== Support for Dina Boluarte ===
Keiko Fujimori announced that Fuerza Popular would support Dina Boluarte's government after Boluarte was sworn in as president following the removal and detention of Pedro Castillo in December 2022. Fujimori expressed gratitude to the armed forces and national police for their role in safeguarding democracy and the constitutional order, and said Boluarte could count on the backing of Fuerza Popular.

== Electoral history ==
Logo of the Popular Force until 2024.

List of presidential election by percentage
2011 election, 1st round	23.55%
2011 election, 2nd round	48.55%
2016 election, 1st round	39.86%
2016 election, 2nd round	49.88%
2021 election, 1st round	13.41%
2021 election, 2nd round	49.87%
2026 election, 1st round	17.18%
2026 election, 2nd round	50.13%

=== 2010 regional and municipal elections ===
The party failed to be elected in any regional governments and only elected 5 regional councilors.

=== 2011 general elections ===
In the 2011 election, Popular Force (as Force 2011) registered Keiko Fujimori's nomination for President, with Rafael Rey for First Vice President and Jaime Yoshiyama for Second Vice President. Their ticket placed second with 23.55% of votes in the first round and made it into the runoff, but the ticket was defeated by Ollanta Humala's ticket in the runoff with 48.55%. The party obtained 37 seats in the Congress in which, Keiko's brother, Kenji Fujimori was the most voted congressman and 1 seat (Rafael Rey of National Renewal) in the Andean Parliament.

=== 2014 regional and municipal elections ===
In the 2014 elections, the party won three regional governorships.

=== 2016 general elections ===
In the 2016 elections, the party won an absolute majority in Congress (73 out of 130 seats) and won three out of five seats in the Andean Parliament. In the presidential vote, party leader Keiko Fujimori was defeated again by a small margin, gaining 49.88% in the runoff against Pedro Pablo Kuczynski of the Peruvians for Change with 50.12%.

=== 2018 regional and municipal elections ===
In the 2018 elections, Popular Force saw a large loss of popularity with the party not being elected to a single position in Lima or in any regional governments. According to Datum, Keiko Fujimori also saw an approval rating of 11% while 83% expressed disapproval.

=== 2020 snap parliamentary elections ===
In the 2020 snap parliamentary elections, Popular Force lost most of its seats in Congress from 73 to 15 seats after being the previous largest party in the 2016–19 Congressional term.

=== 2021 general elections ===
The party once again nominated Keiko Fujimori for the presidency, with former Congress President Luis Galarreta and former Lieutenant Mayor of Lima Patricia Juárez for the first and second vice presidency by the votes of 37 party delegates, as it was the only list. After this, the campaign began and former 2016 National Solidarity-Union for Peru presidential nominee Hernando Guerra García, son of former Congressman Roger Guerra García was selected to head the party's congressional list for Lima. In the first round, Keiko Fujimori placed second behind Pedro Castillo of Free Peru and ahead of Rafael López Aliaga of Popular Renewal. However, in the run-off, Fujimori lost the election to Pedro Castillo by a margin of 44,000 votes but refused to concede the election and made several fraud allegations.

=== 2026 general elections ===
In her fourth attempt for the presidency, Keiko Fujimori launched her campaign in October 2025. The party had initially sought to run her father, but he died in September 2024. Luis Galarreta and Miki Torres ran on the ticket as her first and second vice presidents, respectively. In the first round, Popular Force won a plurality of the seats in both houses of the newly-established bicameral Congress. Fujimori advanced to the second round and placed first. After weeks of counting, Keiko Fujimori defeated leftist Roberto Sánchez, becoming Peru's first elected female president.

== List of party presidents ==
No.	Image	Name (Birth-Death)	Term in office			Notes
No.	Image	Name (Birth-Death)	Term start	Term end	Time in office	Notes
1		Keiko Fujimori (born 1975)	22 July 2009	Incumbent	17 years, 97 days	–

== Controversies ==
=== Participation in the conjunctures ===
At the beginning of the year, with the new Law on Political Parties, changes were made in the regulations. That is why the ONPE contemplated a sanction on Fuerza Popular for the Cocktail Case, in which the party carried out money laundering of S / 4.6 million in 6 cocktails. According to Luis Barboza, Finding inconsistencies, the case would go to the commission of identity infringements, where eventually they could impose a sanction on the party that leads the presidential candidate." On the other hand, the National Elections Jury indicated the exclusion of Vladimiro Huaroc because delivered food and water to Satipo, which is prohibited in article 42 of the current party law.

=== Keiko Fujimori and Popular Force case ===
For two years before the outbreak of the Odebrecht scandal, Fuerza Popular was under investigation for the financing of its electoral campaign prior to the 2011 elections when it participated under the name of Fuerza 2011. A part of the millionaire financing of the campaign had been supported before the ONPE with alleged voluntary contributions from numerous supporters, through the holding of cocktails and raffles. In October 2015, a law student, David Apaza Enríquez, noting that the accounts delivered by Fuerza Popular to the ONPE did not match, filed the first complaint against said party with the Prosecutor's Office, under the thesis that the financing of the campaign The 2011 election had actually been done with illicit money ("ghost contributions") and therefore it would be a case of money laundering. The Prosecutor's Office opened an investigation on 2 November 2015. It was the beginning of the so-called Cocktails Case.

Other complaints arose against Fuerza Popular, all under the presumption of money laundering. There were also complaints against Keiko Fujimori herself and her husband Mark Vito Villanella, after it was revealed that the latter had made a purchase of land in Chilca for $617,329. In March 2016, the prosecutor Germán Juárez Atoche opened a preliminary investigation of Keiko Fujimori and her husband.

The revelation of the Odebrecht case gave further clues to the money laundering investigation. Effective collaborator Jorge Barata, Odebrecht representative in Peru, revealed that he held meetings with former presidential candidate Keiko Fujimori during the 2011 election campaign. In May 2017, Marcelo Odebrecht confirmed that he gave money to the main presidential candidates of 2011, including to the Fujimori candidate. Later, Keiko's situation was complicated when it was revealed that on the Odebrecht agenda there was a note with the name of the former presidential candidate along with an amount (the text read: "Increase Keiko for 500 e fazer visit"). The figure was said to refer to $500,000 and was a contribution to her 2011 election campaign.

In September 2017, the prosecutor of the Nation Pablo Sánchez ordered that a single incumbent prosecutor be in charge of investigating all the complaints that appeared against Keiko and her party, which came under the jurisdiction of the subsystem specialized in crimes of money laundering and loss of ownership. The designated prosecutor was José Domingo Pérez, who in October of the same year adapted the investigation to the Organized Crime Law and extended the term for the investigation to 36 months.

In November 2017, Peruvian prosecutors traveled to Brazil, where they heard Marcelo Odebrecht's testimony of having provided money for Keiko's campaign, although pointing out that Barata was the only one who could confirm the exact amount. He also revealed that the initials AG that appear on his agenda referred to former President Alan García, who was very interested in Odebrecht winning the tender for the South Peruvian gas pipeline, among other works.

At that time, Fujimorismo, through its then-congressman Daniel Salaverry, filed a constitutional complaint against the prosecutor of the Nation Pablo Sánchez for allegedly not having initiated investigations against several Peruvian companies that are Odebrecht partners, which, in his view, contrasted with the open process against Keiko. This act was interpreted as a retaliation by Fujimorism for the investigation against its leader and as an attempt to coerce the prosecution by violating their autonomy.

On 7 December 2017, the Judiciary authorized the search and home search of two Fuerza Popular premises, one located in Cercado de Lima and the other in Surco. This was due to indications that the Fujimori party had double accounting or parallel accounting to hide Odebrecht's contributions to Keiko's electoral campaign. Party spokesmen accused the prosecutor Pablo Sánchez of being behind the raid, which would have been in retaliation for the constitutional complaint filed against her.

According to various analysts, all this prompted Fujimori to try to overthrow the country's institutions, in order to shield its leader Keiko. For this reason, it would have promoted from Congress the presidential vacancy process against PPK, who, however, was able to overcome it thanks to a faction of Fujimori headed by Kenji Fujimori (the so-called avengers by the media), who abstained from voting for favor of it. This occurred at the end of December 2017. In March 2018, a second vacancy process was promoted, but before the vote in Congress took place, President Kuczynski resigned after the so-called Kenjivideos were revealed.

On 28 February 2018, Barata revealed to the Peruvian prosecution team that he had contributed $1,200,000 in favor of Keiko's electoral campaign in 2011, and that the intermediaries for that delivery had been Jaime Yoshiyama Tanaka (then secretary general and campaign manager of Fuerza 2011), Augusto Bedoya Cámere (former Fujimori minister) and Ricardo Briceño (then president of CONFIEP). Specifically, Yoshiyama and Bedoya would have been given $500,000 during the first round campaign, and another $500,000 in the second round campaign. The remaining 200,000 dollars would have been given as a result of a meeting of businessmen called by Briceño, a union that was oriented by the Fujimori candidacy, fearful that the left-wing nationalist Ollanta Humala would win the presidency. After that revelation, the money laundering prosecutor's office raided the homes of Yoshiyama and Bedoya, and entered the CONFIEP headquarters where they seized documents.

In September 2018, the newspaper El Comercio de Lima reported encrypted emails exchanged between Jorge Barata, former head of Odebrecht in Peru, and Luiz Antonio Mameri, former business leader of the construction company for Latin America and Angola, which would confirm the money contributions illegal to the electoral campaigns of Ollanta Humala and Keiko Fujimori in 2011.

On 10 October 2018, Judge Richard Concepción Carhuancho, at the request of prosecutor José Domingo Pérez, ordered the preliminary detention for ten days of Keiko Fujimori along with 19 other people (including Jaime Yoshiyama and Augusto Bedoya), within the framework of investigations for money laundering allegedly occurred in the 2011 election campaign. This arrest was justified, arguing that there was a serious risk of flight on the part of Keiko, accused of having constituted a criminal organization within her party. Months ago, a recording of the CNM Audios case had been revealed, where Supreme Judge César Hinostroza was heard coordinating with an unidentified third party about a meeting with a "Mrs. K… force number 1". It was an allusion to Keiko and Fuerza Popular that would have been seeking to obtain favors in the process that was being followed on money laundering. The preliminary arrest of Fuerza Popular advisers, Ana Herz de Vega and Pier Figari Mendoza, was also ordered, an order that was carried out while they were attending a march in favor of Keiko. Other personal advisers of the leader were also arrested and their homes searched.

Keiko and the other detainees appealed to the Second Appeals Chamber of the Judiciary, which after hearing the arguments of the parties, annulled the preliminary detention, arguing that it had not been properly supported. However, a few days later, the prosecutor Pérez formalized the preparatory investigation and requested 36 months of preventive detention for Keiko and 11 other people involved for alleged money laundering (including Jaime Yoshiyama, his nephew Jorge Yoshiyama, Vicente Silva Checa, Augusto Bedoya, Ana Herz and Pier Figari), a request that was evaluated by Concepción Carhuancho himself. The hearings began on 19 October. Keiko requested the recusal of this judge, accusing him of lack of impartiality, but the same judge denied the request. Prosecutor José Domingo Pérez gave a series of arguments to sustain that a criminal organization had been established within the Popular Force.

Regarding the need to apply preventive detention, the prosecutor argued the existence of the danger of impeding judicial work on the part of the accused, taking advantage of her position as political leader. In this regard, he mentioned as evidence a series of chats of private conversations by Telegram (called La Botica) where members of the Fujimori Congressional caucus are read to agree to discredit the prosecutor. It is known that said material was provided by one of the prosecution's protected witnesses, the congressman from Fuerza Popular, Rolando Reátegui. The prosecutor also mentioned Keiko's maneuvers to delay the process and her interference in the justice system to obtain favors. Regarding these events, one of the protected witnesses confirmed that Mrs. K mentioned in one of the CNM Audios was Keiko herself, who was seeking to obtain favors from Judge Hinostroza in the Cocktails Case. Another support for the preventive detention was the discovery at the home of Vicente Silva Checa, an advisor to Keiko Fujimori and a former Montesinista, of documents related to the Lava Jato Commission of Congress, as well as notes on the legal strategy of Popular Force, indications that there had been a purpose from the top leadership of said party to hinder the development of the process. After reviewing the request for preventive detention against Keiko Fujimori, Judge Concepción Carhuancho began to review that of the other ten people from Keiko's environment. He was expected to give his final verdict at the end of all of them, but on 31 October 2018, when he had only evaluated the legal situation of five of them (Ana Herz, Pier Figari, Vicente Silva Checa, Jaime Yoshiyama, in addition to Keiko), he surprisingly decided to give his verdict regarding Keiko Fujimori. After accepting the tax thesis that accused him of being the head of an alleged criminal organization within his party that laundered a million dollars delivered by Odebrecht in 2011, and considering that there was a risk that he would obstruct the process, the judge issued 36 months of preventive prison for Keiko Fujimori. Keiko was held in the Women's Annex Prison in Chorrillos.

In the following days, Judge Concepción Carhuancho continued evaluating the legal situation of the rest of those involved, against whom he also ordered preventive detention for 36 months for alleged money laundering. Among them were Vicente Silva Checa, Pier Figari and Ana Herz, whom a protected witness from the prosecution accused as the people who, together with Keiko, were the ones who made the most important decisions of the party, who made them alleged leaders of the criminal organization. Augusto Bedoya was only prevented from leaving the country for 18 months.

A major turnaround occurred when Jorge Yoshiyama Sasaki, another of the 11 defendants, confessed that his uncle Jaime Yoshiyama had given him $100,000 for Keiko's 2011 campaign, with the task of looking for false contributors to justify his origin (method of « smurfing 'or fractionation of money). He also said that he was unaware that it was Odebrecht money. Until then, all the defendants had denied the existence of the "smurf"; With Jorge Yoshiyama's confession, the defense was forced to rethink its strategy. For having accepted the charges against him and collaborated with the investigation, Jorge Yoshiyama was only given a restricted appearance.

As there were many protected witnesses who admitted that the dozens of alleged donations of money for Keiko's electoral campaign were fraudulent, the prosecutor Pérez expanded the investigation and summoned 500 people to answer if they had in fact been real contributors. Among them were José Chlimper Ackerman, former secretary of Fuerza Popular, and various businessmen (24 November 2018).

In January 2020, the tribunal decided, four votes to three, to grant her habeas corpus on the grounds that the preventative detention sentence was invalid for its violation of her liberty. Shortly afterward, her husband Mark Vito began a hunger strike in a camp installed in front of the prison where she was detained. On 28 January, the judge Victor Zuniga Urday re-imposed a preventive prison for 15 months on the charges of money laundering from the Odebrecht company. On 30 April 2020, a Peruvian appeals court overturned her 15-month detention order and granted her a conditional release from prison. She was finally released on bail on 5 May 2020.

=== First impeachment proceedings against Pedro Pablo Kuczynski ===
In December 2017, 10 congressmen from the party (including Kenji Fujimori) abstained from voting in favor of the vacancy against President Pedro Pablo Kuczynski, a decision that the party had agreed to vote in favor unanimously. As the vacancy did not prosper due to the 10 abstention votes, the party decided to initiate a disciplinary process against them at the beginning of 2018, when Congressman Bienvenido Ramirez was expelled and in a few hours Kenji Fujimori was expelled too, the remaining eight congressmen decided to resign. to the party, a decision that had already been agreed upon before if one of them was withdrawn from Fuerza Popular.

== Political position ==
Popular Force is considered a right-wing to far-right. Internationally, the party has aligned with right-wing groups, with Peruvian investigative journalism website OjoPúblico writing in an article discussing right-wing alliances in the Americas that members of the far-right Spanish political party Vox traveled to Peru to obtain signatures for the anti-leftist manifesto known as the Madrid Charter, with the parties Go on Country of Hernando de Soto, Popular Force of Keiko Fujimori, and Popular Renewal of Rafael López Aliaga signing the document. Peruvian business executives, including the owner of Willax Televisión, also participated in discussions and signed the charter. The party revolves around the personality-based political doctrine of Fujimorism. Historically, some members identified themselves as centre-left (Luz Salgado, Vladimiro Huaroc and Hernando Guerra García) or centre-right (Keiko Fujimori).

The party advocates for a social market economy similar to Alberto Fujimori's "True Social Market Economy", which, however, was supportive of free market reforms, including neoliberal economic policies and reforms like economic liberalization which developed Peru into a free market economy. In an article by Keiko Fujimori, she was quoted as saying "I propose a model of a social market economy, not marxism or communism."

== Election results ==
=== Presidential ===
Election	Candidate	First round		Second round		Result
Election	Candidate	Votes	%	Votes	%	Result
2011	Keiko Fujimori	3,449,595	23.55	7,490,647	48.55	Lost
2016	Keiko Fujimori	6,115,073	39.86	8,555,880	49.88	Lost
2021	Keiko Fujimori	1,930,762	13.41	8,792,117	49.87	Lost
2026	Keiko Fujimori	2,877,678	17.18	9,223,396	50.13	Won

=== Congress of the Republic ===
==== Unicameral Congress of the Republic ====
Election	Leader	Votes	%	Seats	+/–	Rank	Government
2011	Keiko Fujimori	2,948,781	22.97	37 / 120		2nd	Minority
2016	Keiko Fujimori	4,431,077	36.34	73 / 130	▲36	▲1st	Majority
2020	Keiko Fujimori	1,081,174	7.31	15 / 130	▼58	▼3rd	Minority
2021	Keiko Fujimori	1,457,694	11.34	24 / 130	▲9	▲2nd	Minority

==== Chamber of Deputies ====
Election	Leader	Votes	%	Seats	+/–	Rank	Government
2026	Keiko Fujimori	2,114,389	14.66	41 / 130	▲17	1st	Government

==== Senate ====
Election	Leader	Votes	%	Seats	+/–	Rank	Government
2026	Keiko Fujimori	2,227,962	15.06	22 / 60		1st	Government

=== Andean Parliament ===
Election	Leader	Votes	%	Seats	+/–	Rank
2011	Keiko Fujimori	2,353,674	23.21	1 / 5		2nd
2016	Keiko Fujimori	3,842,651	38.10	3 / 5	▲2	▲1st
2021	Keiko Fujimori	1,249,938	11.85	1 / 5	▼2	▼2nd
2026	Keiko Fujimori	2,038,478	15.25	1 / 5	Steady	▲1st

== See also ==
- Alliance for the Future (Peru)
- Cambio 90
- New Majority (Peru)
- Sí Cumple
