= Keiko Fujimori =

President of Peru since 2026

- Fujimori in 2026

President of Peru
- Incumbent
- Assumed office 28 July 2026
- Prime Minister: Luis Galarreta
- Vice President: First Vice President Luis Galarreta; Second Vice President Miki Torres
- Preceded by: José María Balcázar

President of Popular Force
- Incumbent
- Assumed office 22 July 2009
- Secretary-General: See list: Jaime Yoshiyama; Joaquín Ramírez; José Chlimper; Luz Salgado; Luis Galarreta
- Preceded by: Position established

Member of Congress
- In office 27 July 2006 – 26 July 2011
- Constituency: Lima

First Lady of Peru (Note: Concurrently serving as the president of the Foundation for the Children of Peru)
- In role 23 August 1994 – 22 November 2000
- President: Alberto Fujimori
- Preceded by: Susana Higuchi
- Succeeded by: Nilda Jara

Personal details
- Born: Keiko Sofía Fujimori Higuchi; 25 May 1975 (age 51) Jesús María, Lima, Peru
- Party: Popular Force (2010–present)
- Other political affiliations: New Majority (1992–2010)
- Spouse: Mark Villanella (m. 2004; div. 2022)
- Children: 2
- Parents: Alberto Fujimori (father); Susana Higuchi (mother)
- Relatives: Kenji Fujimori (brother); Santiago Fujimori (uncle)
- Education: Stony Brook University; Boston University (BBA); Columbia University (MBA)

Keiko Sofía Fujimori Higuchi (Note: Latin American Spanish pronunciation: [ˈkejko soˈfia fuxiˈmoɾi (x)iˈɣutʃi]; Japanese: 藤森 恵子, romanized: Fujimori Keiko) (born 25 May 1975) is a Peruvian businesswoman and politician who has served as the president of Peru since 2026. The eldest daughter of former president Alberto Fujimori, she is the leading figure of Fujimorism, the conservative political movement associated with her father, and has led its party, Popular Force, since 2009. Fujimori served as First Lady of Peru from 1994 to 2000 and as a member of Congress for Lima from 2006 to 2011.

Born in Lima to Alberto Fujimori and Susana Higuchi, she became First Lady at the age of 19 in 1994, after her father removed her mother from the role during the couple's separation; she held the position until the collapse of his government in 2000. She studied business administration in the United States at Stony Brook and Boston University and later at Columbia. Fujimori entered electoral politics in 2006, winning a congressional seat with a record number of votes, and in 2010 she took over the Force 2011 party, later renamed Popular Force.

Fujimori ran for the presidency but lost her first three successive presidential bids in narrow and polarizing runoffs to Ollanta Humala in 2011, Pedro Pablo Kuczynski in 2016, and Pedro Castillo in 2021. Beginning in 2018, she was prosecuted in connection with the Odebrecht corruption scandal, spending more than a year in pretrial detention but was not convicted. After narrowly losing the 2021 runoff, she made unsubstantiated claims of electoral fraud that international observers rejected. A second corruption case was dismissed in 2025.

Fujimori narrowly won the presidency during her fourth attempt in 2026, defeating Roberto Sánchez in the runoff. Fujimori is the second woman to become president of Peru, after Dina Boluarte, and the first to be directly elected into the office.

== Early life and education ==
Keiko Sofía Fujimori Higuchi was born on 25 May 1975 in the Jesús María district of Lima. A third-generation Peruvian of Japanese descent, she is the eldest of four children of Alberto Fujimori and Susana Higuchi. She also has three younger siblings, including Kenji, who later became a congressman. The name "Keiko" means “blessed child” in Japanese. Her parents' marriage was subject to constant troubles, and she often mediated between them. She and her siblings attended the Catholic school Colegio Sagrados Corazones Recoleta in Lima. According to her biographers, when she was a teenager, she felt pressure to please her father and used publicly funded presidential vehicles, including the presidential jet, for personal events.

Fujimori's father was elected president of Peru in 1990 and governed until 2000. He implemented Plan Verde – an operation to control the media, enact forced sterilizations and to establish a neoliberal economy – after dissolving Congress in a 1992 self-coup. Keiko Fujimori has denied knowing about the sterilizations when they were happening, and has supported reparations for the victims. She has also said that her father's government was the “best in Peruvian history.”

In 1993, after her father's self-coup, Fujimori finished secondary school and moved to the United States, enrolling at Stony Brook University to study business administration. Investigators later alleged that the roughly $918,000 cost of her and her siblings' schooling was paid by her father's intelligence chief, Vladimiro Montesinos, from state intelligence funds (his former secretary said Keiko received some of the money in person) and that, per La Prensa, a foundation in Panama financed her studies at Boston University. She graduated from Boston University in May 1997.

== First Lady and early political career (1994–2006) ==
=== First lady ===
Fujimori's studies were interrupted in 1994, when her parents separated after her mother, Susana Higuchi, publicly accused her father of corruption and of having her tortured, prompting him to remove Higuchi from the ceremonial role of First Lady of Peru. Summoned home from Stony Brook, Fujimori assumed the position on 23 August 1994 at the age of 19, becoming the youngest first lady in the Americas. Her biographers describe the role as largely ceremonial and say her father chose her for her loyalty. She headed the Foundation for the Children of Peru, a body customarily led by the first lady, and founded a charity providing heart surgery for children with congenital heart defects.

At the 1995 inauguration of Brazilian president Fernando Henrique Cardoso, Fujimori first voiced an ambition to become Peru's first woman president, though she said she was reluctant to enter politics, which she felt had disrupted her family and adolescence. Her parents divorced in 1996. Higuchi later alleged that she had been tortured repeatedly during the presidency and that Alberto had ordered Vladimiro Montesinos to kill her, an accusation Montesinos denied. As first lady, Fujimori publicly downplayed her mother's allegations, dismissing the torture claims as a "legend", and was criticised—particularly by the opposition—for failing to defend her. She also faced accusations that she had diverted clothing donated by Japanese-Peruvians, in a case that reached the Supreme Court of Peru, and that she had the Government Palace repainted pink. She later reconciled with her mother, who went on to support her presidential campaigns. During these years she grew close to Ana Herz de la Vega, who became a lasting mentor.

In 1998, Fujimori publicly opposed her father's bid for a third term, then considered unconstitutional, saying: "As a daughter, I would prefer that my father rest, but as a citizen, I believe he is what the country requires." She nonetheless campaigned for him in 1995 and 2000, and as the scandal surrounding Montesinos deepened, her father delegated greater responsibilities to her, including the decision to dissolve the Montesinos-controlled National Intelligence Service (SIN). In November 2000, Alberto Fujimori fled to Japan and resigned the presidency amid a sweeping corruption scandal; his daughter urged him instead to return and defend himself in court. She left the Government Palace on 21 November 2000, when Congress removed him from office, and—declining her mother's offer to live together—moved in with a paternal aunt.

=== Education in the United States ===
After visiting her father in Tokyo in 2001, Fujimori moved to the United States in 2002 to study for a master's in business administration at Columbia University, stepping back from politics, taking a job at General Motors, and focusing on her marriage. In 2004 she married Mark Villanella in Lima, in a ceremony officiated by the Archbishop of Lima, Juan Luis Cipriani Thorne, after which the couple returned to New York.

In 2005, Fujimori's father told her he intended to relocate to Chile and campaign for the 2006 general election. He arrived in Santiago on 6 November 2005, but was arrested by Interpol shortly afterward and barred from the race, along with his Sí Cumple coalition.

== Congress of Peru (2006–2011) ==
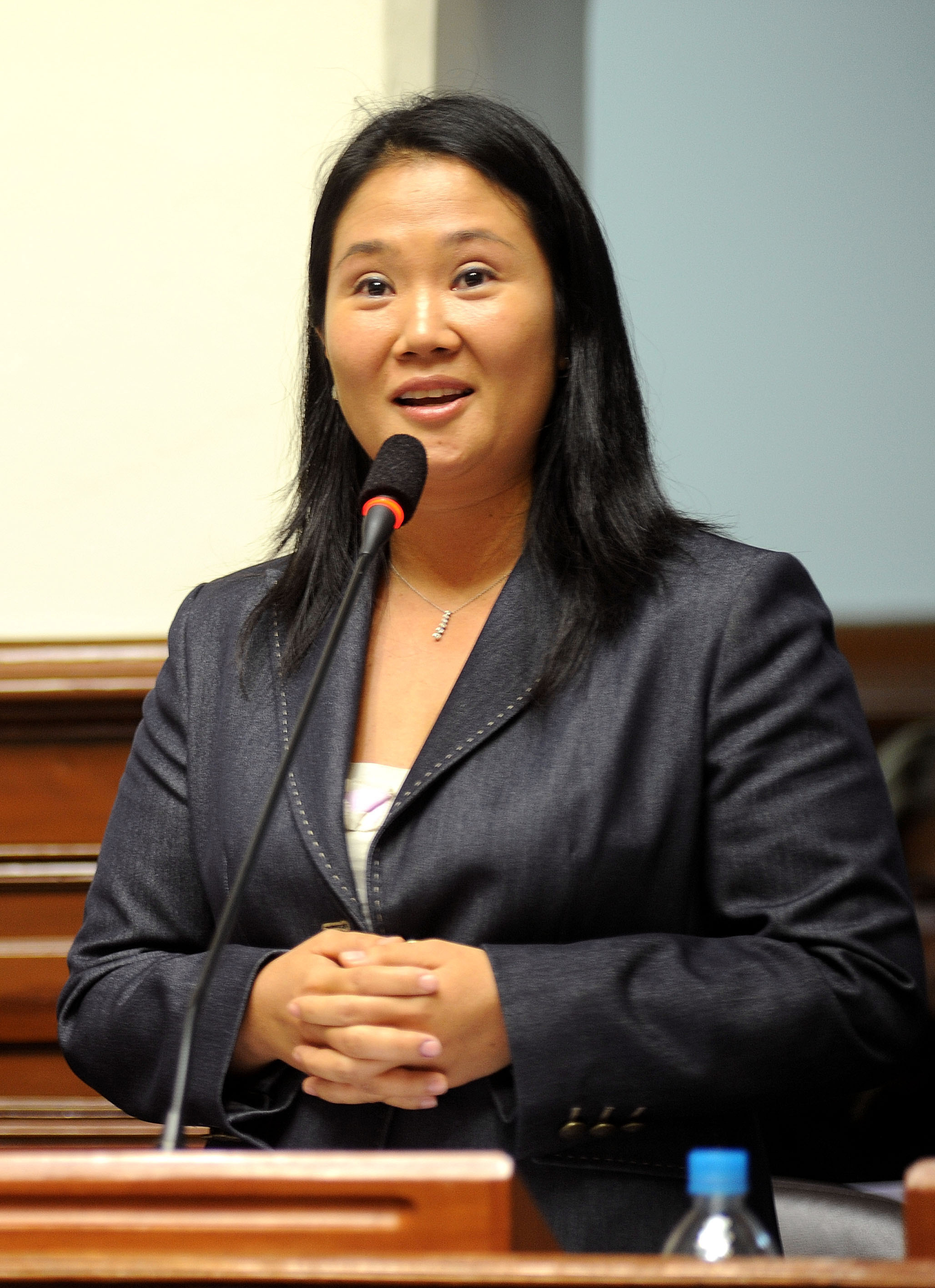
Fujimori in 2010

After her father's 2005 arrest in Chile, Fujimori ended her residency in the United States and returned to Peru to run for office, partly to campaign for his release. With Alberto barred from the 2006 election, his supporters formed the Alliance for the Future (Alianza por el Futuro); Fujimori, then 31 and constitutionally too young to run for president, headed its congressional list for Lima. She was elected with 602,869 votes—the highest total of any candidate nationwide and, at the time, a record for a Peruvian legislator—while the coalition's presidential nominee, Martha Chávez, finished fourth and the alliance won 13 of 120 seats. Fujimori attributed her result largely to public gratitude toward her father.

In Congress from 2006 to 2011, Fujimori led the fujimorista bloc as what she called a "constructive opposition" to President Alan García and his APRA party, maintaining a working dialogue that critics linked to lenient treatment of her imprisoned father. A low-profile legislator but a prominent spokesperson for the movement, she concentrated on criminal-justice measures, unsuccessfully seeking to reinstate the death penalty for terrorism and other grave crimes and sponsoring tougher sentencing for repeat offenders. She introduced about 20 bills over five years, six of which passed, and was criticized for missing some 500 sessions during a term in which she took maternity leave and travelled abroad, including to complete her MBA at Columbia University. In 2008, she launched a new party, Force 2011 (later renamed Popular Force), to unify Fujimorismo behind a 2011 presidential bid.

Following her father's extradition from Chile in September 2007, Fujimori organized demonstrations in his support and predicted his acquittal. In April 2009, Peru's Supreme Court convicted him of human rights abuses—including the Barrios Altos massacre and La Cantuta massacre—and sentenced him to 25 years in prison. Fujimori condemned the verdict as an "injustice" and the product of "political and judicial persecution", and vowed to pardon her father if she were elected president.

== Presidential campaigns (2010–2026) ==
Fujimori ran for president in four consecutive general elections (2011, 2016, 2021 and 2026) and is the only candidate in modern Peruvian history to reach four consecutive presidential runoffs. She lost the first three by narrow margins before defeating Roberto Sánchez in 2026, becoming the first woman elected president of Peru and returning Fujimorism to power 25 years after her father's government collapsed. Her platforms consistently combined hardline security policies with defense of Peru's market-oriented economic model, while her handling of her father's legacy shifted from distance to open embrace.

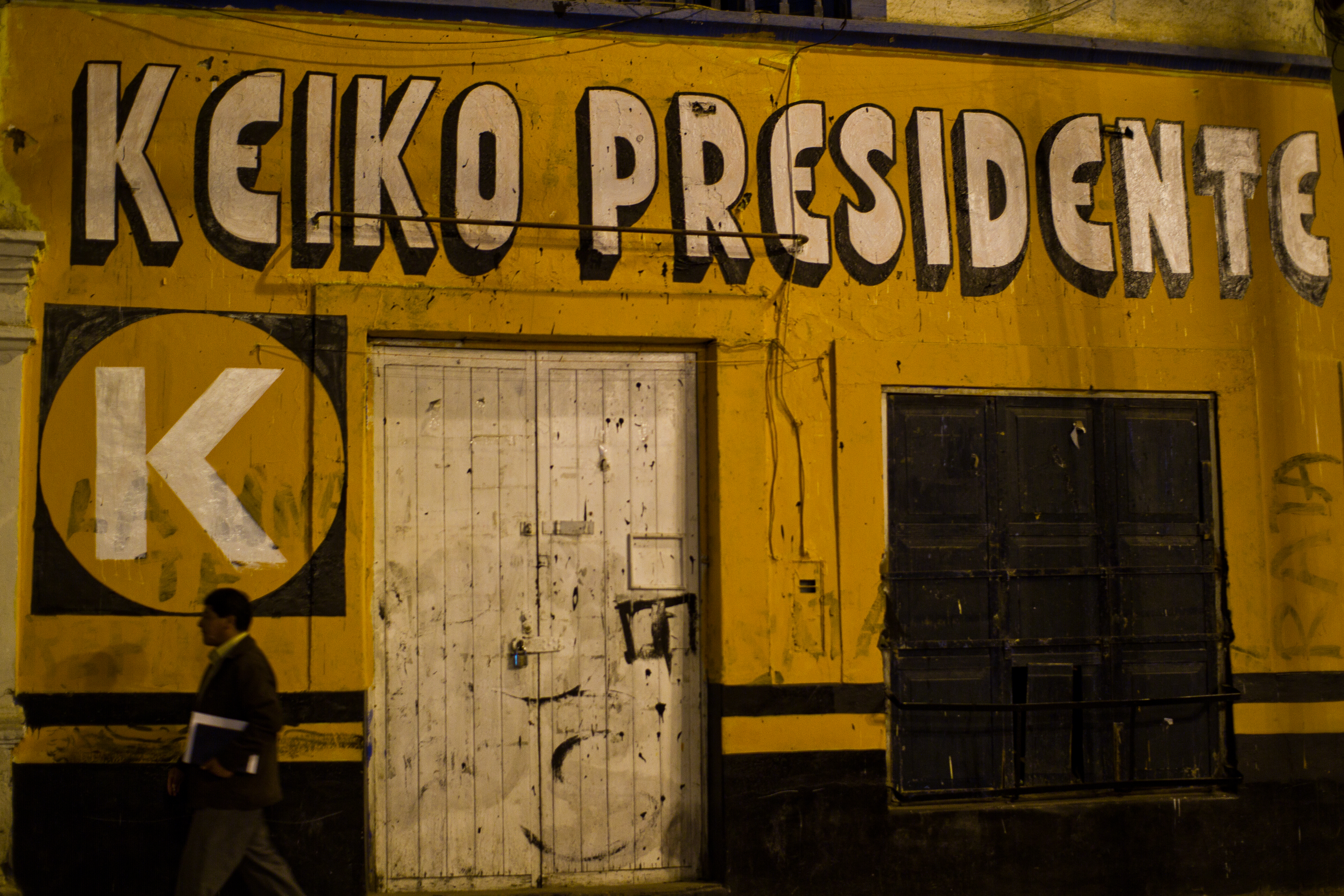
A mural in support of Fujimori during the 2011 general election.

In 2011, running for the newly founded Force 2011, she campaigned on her father's record against terrorism and economic instability while blaming its crimes chiefly on Vladimiro Montesinos and pledging not to pardon him. She placed second in the first round with 23.6% and lost the runoff to Ollanta Humala, 48.66% to 51.34%. The party, renamed Fuerza Popular in 2013, reorganized nationally ahead of a second bid.

In 2016, she made her most explicit break with her father's government, signing a "commitment of honor" against authoritarian practices, endorsing the Truth and Reconciliation Commission's findings and again promising no pardon. She won the first round decisively with about 40%, and Popular Force took 73 of 130 congressional seats, but her runoff lead collapsed amid money-laundering allegations against party secretary-general Joaquín Ramírez and renewed anti-Fujimorista mobilization; she lost to Pedro Pablo Kuczynski by roughly 41,000 votes (49.88% to 50.12%).

Fujimori subsequently led the congressional opposition with her party, controlling Congress for the next decade and utilizing what were described as obstructionist strategies to block policies aimed to prevent corruption while she attempted to govern Peru through the legislative body. Her party then engaged in constitutional hardball to remove multiple presidents from office between 2016 and 2026, removing power from the executive and placing it into Congress.

In October 2018, Fujimori was arrested on money-laundering charges over allegedly undeclared Odebrecht contributions to her campaigns, the Cocktails Case, spending intermittent periods in pretrial detention until May 2020. In 2021, reversing her 2016 pledge, she promised to pardon her father and campaigned on a "heavy hand" against crime. She advanced from the first round with 13.4%, her lowest share, and lost the runoff to Pedro Castillo by roughly 44,000 votes (49.87% to 50.13%). As Castillo's lead emerged she alleged fraud without presenting evidence and sought to annul some 200,000 predominantly rural votes; international observers found the election consistent with international standards, and commentators compared her challenge to Donald Trump's efforts to overturn the 2020 U.S. election.

According to Human Rights Watch, there were concerns for years that Fujimori's bloc in Congress was attempting to gain control of the Constitutional Court. In May 2022, 6 of 7 magistrates of the Constitutional Court were replaced in an opaque procedure by Congress, with the court subsequently supporting the opinions of the legislative body. After clashing with Congress throughout his presidency, President Castillo attempted to dissolve the legislative body on 7 December 2022, saying that it sought to create a "congressional dictatorship" with the help of the Constitutional Court, though both of the bodies mentioned rejected his position, ordered his removal from office and Castillo was arrested. On 4 December 2023, the Constitutional Court ordered the release of Keiko's father, Alberto, who died months later on 11 September 2024. The Constitutional Court annulled Fujimori's Cocktails Case trial in October 2025, and she announced her fourth candidacy days later; the case was dismissed in January 2026.

Campaigning under the slogan "Perú con orden" on a hardline security platform amid a national extortion and crime crisis, she won the first round with 17.18% and defeated Sánchez in the 7 June runoff by 49,641 votes out of more than 18 million cast, the outcome decided by overseas voters after a 22-day count. Sánchez refused to recognize the result, alleging irregularities in overseas ballots; electoral authorities and OAS and EU observer missions reported no significant irregularities.

== Presidency (2026–present) ==
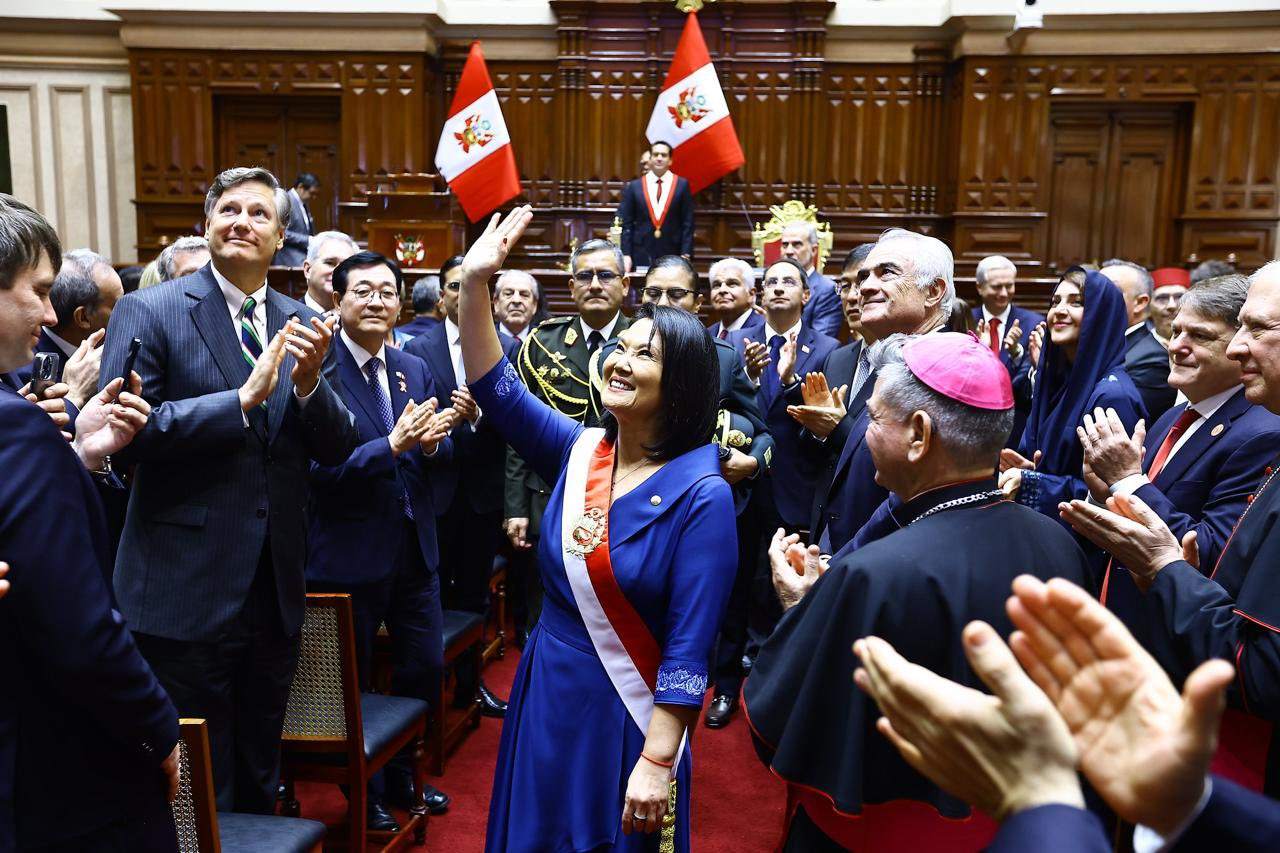
Inauguration of Keiko Fujimori, 28 July 2026

Days before Fujimori's inauguration, the Constitutional Court reversed its October 2022 decision that gave Congress control of Peru's budget, moving spending power from the legislative branch to the executive. Fujimori was inaugurated on 28 July 2026 in Lima. She became Peru's 9th president since late 2016 and the country’s first female elected president. After naming her cabinet, it was reported that of the 19 ministers she named to her cabinet, 15 of them have faced criminal investigations, mainly involving cases of financial corruption. Prime Minister Luis Galarreta himself is suspected of money laundering and involvement in a criminal organization.

Following her inauguration, she vowed to strengthen ties between Peru and the United States. Her administration announced plans to join the Shield of the Americas and said that they will give a "very significant space" for cooperating with the Trump administration. On September 1, 2026, Peru suspended relations with Iran citing "incitment of violence" and "escalation of conflicts."

In October 2026, two months after taking office, her approval rating fell to 28.3%, a drop of 14.5 percentage points from the previous month, while her disapproval rating rose to 53.6%, according to an AtlasIntel poll for Bloomberg News. The main reasons were concerns over the economy and crime. On October 26, Peru adopted the IHRA definition of antisemitism.

== Public and political image ==
Fujimori is the principal heir to Fujimorism, the movement built around her father's 1990–2000 government. Political scientists characterize that movement as a form of right-wing populism and, in its origins, competitive or electoral authoritarianism. Fujimori has presented her own project as continuous with her father's record on the economy and internal security while distancing herself from its human-rights abuses and corruption. Her campaigns have invoked nostalgia for that record while playing down its abuses.

Fujimori supports free-market economics, socially conservative positions, and a hardline approach to crime and public order. During the 2021 campaign she called for governing with a "heavy hand," argued that democracy "cannot be weak," and proposed withdrawing Peru from the Inter-American Court of Human Rights.

Descriptions of Fujimori's ideological position vary. In the mid-2010s, she was commonly characterized as center-right to right-wing. Media and academic sources have also described her positions as far-right, authoritarian, and populist. Fujimori has rejected the far-right characterization, describing her movement as center-right in contrast to her rival Rafael López Aliaga, whom she has called far-right, while labeling her leftist opponents the "radical left".

Her repeated electoral success alongside three runoff defeats has been attributed less to personal popularity than to the party's disciplined organization and to anti-Fujimorismo, a durable "negative partisanship" that political scientists identify as one of Peru's most stable electoral forces.

== Personal life ==
Fujimori married Mark Villanella, a Peruvian-American business man, in 2004. Fujimori and Villanella divorced in 2022. The couple have two daughters.

== Electoral history ==
Year	Office	Type	Party	Main opponent	Party	Votes for Fujimori			Result
Year	Office	Type	Party	Main opponent	Party	Total	%	Plc.	Result
2006	Representative for Lima	General	Alliance for the Future	—N/a		602,869	14.55	1st	Won
2011	President of Peru	General	Force 2011	Ollanta Humala	Peru Wins	3,449,595	23.55	2nd	Runoff
2011	President of Peru	Runoff	Force 2011	Ollanta Humala	Peru Wins	7,490,647	48.55	2nd	Lost
2016	President of Peru	General	Popular Force	Pedro Pablo Kuczynski	Peruvians for Change	6,115,073	39.86	1st	Runoff
2016	President of Peru	Runoff	Popular Force	Pedro Pablo Kuczynski	Peruvians for Change	8,555,880	49.88	2nd	Lost
2021	President of Peru	General	Popular Force	Pedro Castillo	Free Peru	1,930,762	13.41	2nd	Runoff
2021	President of Peru	Runoff	Popular Force	Pedro Castillo	Free Peru	8,792,117	49.87	2nd	Lost
2026	President of Peru	General	Popular Force	Roberto Sánchez	Together for Peru	2,877,678	17.18	1st	Runoff
2026	President of Peru	Runoff	Popular Force	Roberto Sánchez	Together for Peru	9,223,396	50.13	1st	Won

== See also ==
- List of presidents of Peru

== Bibliography ==
- Caballero, Víctor (2019). Mototaxi: auge y caída de Fuerza Popular [Mototaxi : The Rise and Fall of Popular Force] (in Spanish) (Primera edición ed.). Lima, Perú: Ediciones B. ISBN 978-612-47587-7-5.
- Caballero, Víctor (25 May 2026). Señora K. La ofensiva final: El último intento de Keiko Fujimori por llegar al poder [Madame K. The Final Offensive: Keiko Fujimori's Last Bid for Power] (in Spanish). EDICIONES B. ISBN 978-612-4468-45-2.
- Coronel, Omar (25 August 2026). "Autocratization without Spectacle: Peru's Warning to the Region". Review of Democracy.
- Godoy Mejía, José Alejandro (2022). Los herederos de Fujimori: el legado de el último dictador [Fujimori's Heirs: The Legacy of the Last Dictator] (in Spanish) (Primera edición ed.). Lima, Perú: Debate. ISBN 978-612-5068-04-0.
- Hurtado, Veronica (23 December 2024). "La retórica del fraude: consecuencias para la democracia en las elecciones peruanas de 2016 y 2021" [The Fraud Rhetoric: Implications for Democracy in the 2016 and 2021 Peruvian Elections]. Revista Elecciones (in Spanish). 23 (28): 139–176. doi:10.53557/Elecciones.2024.v23n28.05.
- Meléndez, Carlos (28 June 2026). "Petit comité". El Comercio (in Spanish). Lima. ISSN 1605-3052.
- Palacios, Rosa María (21 June 2026). "¿Quo Vadis Keiko Fujimori?". La República (in Spanish). Lima, Peru.
- Reid, Michael (15 June 2026). "Keiko Fujimori's Defining Choice in Peru". Americas Quarterly.
- Ros, Carla Samon (9 July 2026). "Fujimori Legacy Shows Limits of Trump's Push Against China in Peru". Bloomberg.com.
- Sifuentes, Marco (2019). K.O. P.P.K: caída pública y vida secreta de Pedro Pablo Kuczynski [K.O. P.P.K: The Public Downfall and Secret Life of Pedro Pablo Kuczynski]. Memoria Perú (in Spanish). Jonathan Castro (Primera edición ed.). Magdalena del Mar, Lima, Perú: Planeta. ISBN 978-612-319-439-0.
- Sosa, Paolo (2016). "¿El despertar de la Fuerza Popular? Keiko Fujimori y el partido de las paradojas" [Does the Popular Force awaken? Keiko Fujimori and the Party of Paradoxes]. In Meléndez Guerrero, Carlos (ed.). Anticandidatos 2016: el thriller político de las elecciones 2016 (Primera edición ed.). Lima, Perú: Planeta. p. 15-42. ISBN 978-612-319-066-8.
- Tegel, Simeon (8 July 2026). "Will a Keiko Fujimori Presidency Mean the Return of Autocracy to Peru?". World Politics Review.
- Vásquez de Velasco, Valerie; Lira, Ariana; Llanos, Beatriz; Huertas, Mabel (2020). Señora K: ni víctima, ni heroína [Madame K: Neither victim nor heroine]. Colección Segunda vuelta (in Spanish) (Primera edición ed.). Lima: Página Once. ISBN 978-612-48188-6-8.
- Vergara, Alberto (3 August 2026). "Keiko Fujimori en el vecindario derechista" [Keiko Fujimori in the Right-Wing Neighborhood]. El País (in Spanish).
- Zapata, Antonio (29 June 2026). "El 28 de julio del 2026" [On July 28th 2026]. Epicentro TV (in Spanish).
- Zovatto, Daniel (3 August 2026). "El regreso del Fujimorismo y los desafíos de Keiko" [The Return of Fujimorism and Keiko's Challenges]. La Tercera (in Spanish).

Honorary titles
Preceded by Susana Higuchi	First Lady of Peru; 1994–2000	Succeeded by Nilda Jara
Party political offices
New political party	President of Popular Force; 2009–present	Incumbent
New political party	FP nominee for President of Peru; 2011, 2016, 2021, 2026	Most recent
Political offices
Preceded by José María Balcázar	President of Peru; 2026–present	Incumbent
