= Quechua people =

Indigenous people of South America

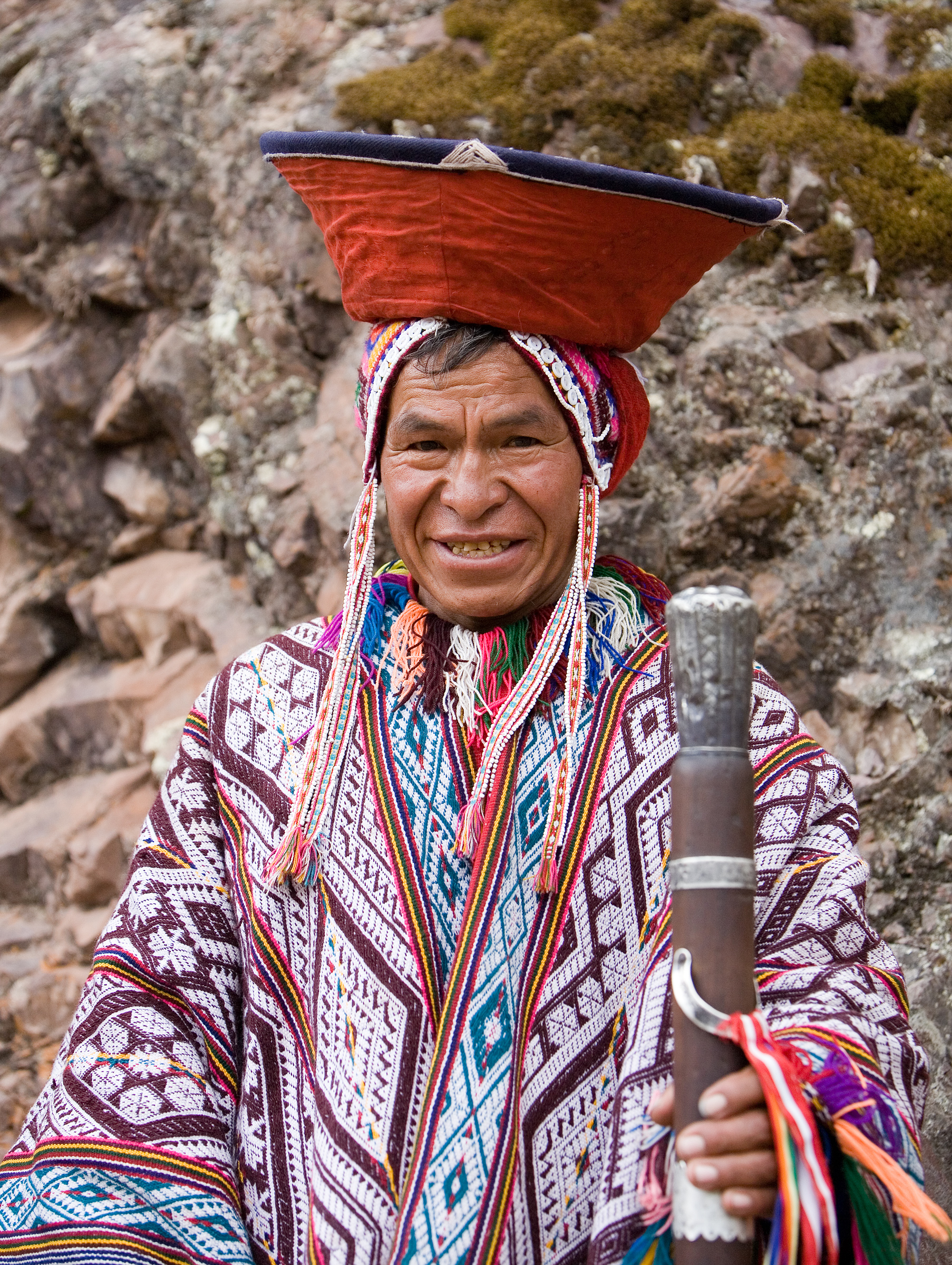
- An Andean man in traditional dress. Pisac, Peru.

Total population
- 10–11 million

Regions with significant populations
- Peru: 5,611,085
- Bolivia: 1,646,174
- Ecuador: 1,592,000
- Argentina: 52,154
- Colombia: 55,000
- Chile: 39,430

Languages
- Native: Quechua; Non-native: Spanish

Religion
- Majority: Catholicism; Minority: Evangelicalism; Traditional

Related ethnic groups
- Aymaras

- Person: Runa / Nuna
- People: Runakuna / Nunakuna
- Language: Runasimi / Nunasimi

The Quechua people (/ˈkɛtʃuə/, US also /ˈkɛtʃwɑː/; Spanish: [ˈketʃwa]), Quichua people or Kichwa people (Ecuador spelling) are indigenous peoples of South America who speak the Quechuan languages, which originated among the Indigenous people of Peru. Although most of the Quechua speakers are native to Peru, there are some significant populations in Ecuador, Bolivia, Chile, Colombia, and Argentina.

== Language ==
The most common Quechua dialect is Southern Quechua. The Kichwa people of Ecuador speak the Kichwa dialect; in Colombia, the Inga people speak Inga Kichwa. The Quechua word for a Quechua speaker is runa or nuna ("person"); the plural is runakuna or nunakuna ("people"). "Quechua speakers call themselves Runa -- simply translated, "the people".

Quechua became Peru's second official language in 1969 under the military dictatorship of Juan Velasco Alvarado. There have been later tendencies toward nation-building among Quechua speakers, particularly in Ecuador (Kichwa) but also in Bolivia, where there are only slight linguistic differences from the Peruvian version. An indication of this effort is the umbrella organization of the Kichwa people in Ecuador, ECUARUNARI (Ecuador Runakunapak Rikcharimuy).

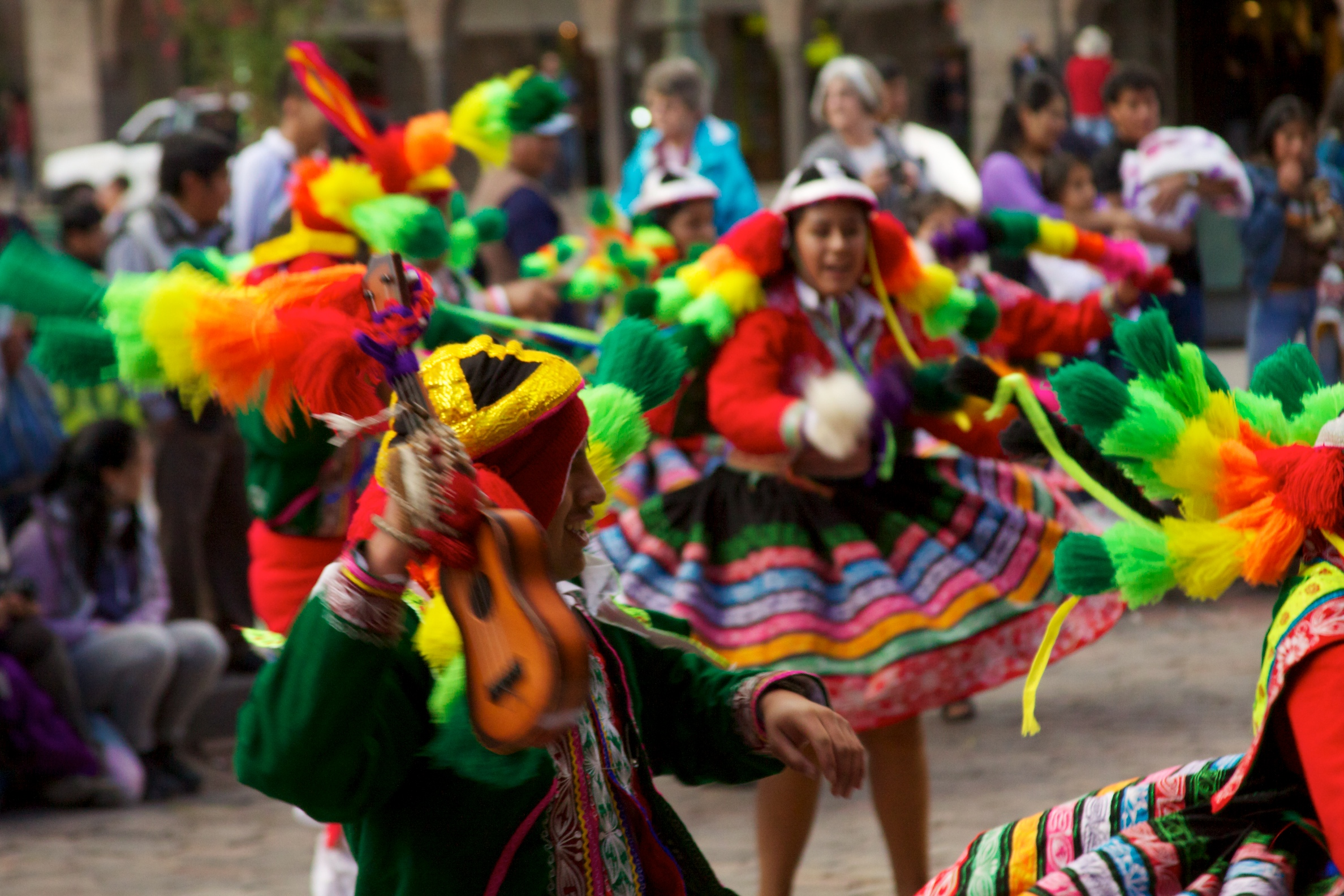
A traditional dance festival in Cusco

== Historical and sociopolitical background ==
Some historical Quechua people are:

- The Chanka people lived in the Huancavelica, Ayacucho, and Apurímac regions of Peru.
- The Huanca people of the Junín Region of Peru spoke Quechua before the Incas did.
- The Inca established the largest empire of the pre-Columbian era.
- The Chincha, an extinct merchant kingdom of the Chincha Islands of Peru.
- The Qolla inhabited the Potosí, Oruro, and La Paz departments of Bolivia.
- The Cañari of Ecuador adopted the Quechua language from the Inca.

The speakers of Quechua total some 5.1 million people in Peru, 1.8 million in Bolivia, 2.5 million in Ecuador (Hornberger and King, 2001), and according to Ethnologue (2006) 33,800 in Chile, 55,500 in Argentina, and a few hundred in Brazil. Only a slight sense of common identity exists among these speakers spread all over Peru, Bolivia and Ecuador. The various Quechua dialects are in some cases so different from one another that mutual understanding is not possible. Quechua was spoken not only by the Incas, but also by long-term enemies of the Inca Empire, including the Huanca (Wanka is a Quechua dialect spoken today in the Huancayo area) and the Chanka (the Chanca dialect of Ayacucho) of Peru, and the Kañari (Cañari) in Ecuador. Quechua was spoken by some of these people, for example, the Wanka, before the Incas of Cusco, while other people, especially in Bolivia but also in Ecuador, adopted Quechua only in Inca times or afterward. Some Christian organizations also refer to a "Quechua people", such as the Christian shortwave radio station HCJB, "The Voice of the Andes" (La Voz de los Andes). The term "Quechua Nation" occurs in such contexts as the name of the Education Council of the Quechua Nation (Consejo Educativo de la Nación Quechua, CENAQ), which is responsible for Quechua instruction or bilingual intercultural schools in the Quechua-speaking regions of Bolivia. Some Quechua say that if nation-states in Latin America had been built following the European pattern, they would be a single, independent nation.

== Material culture and social history ==
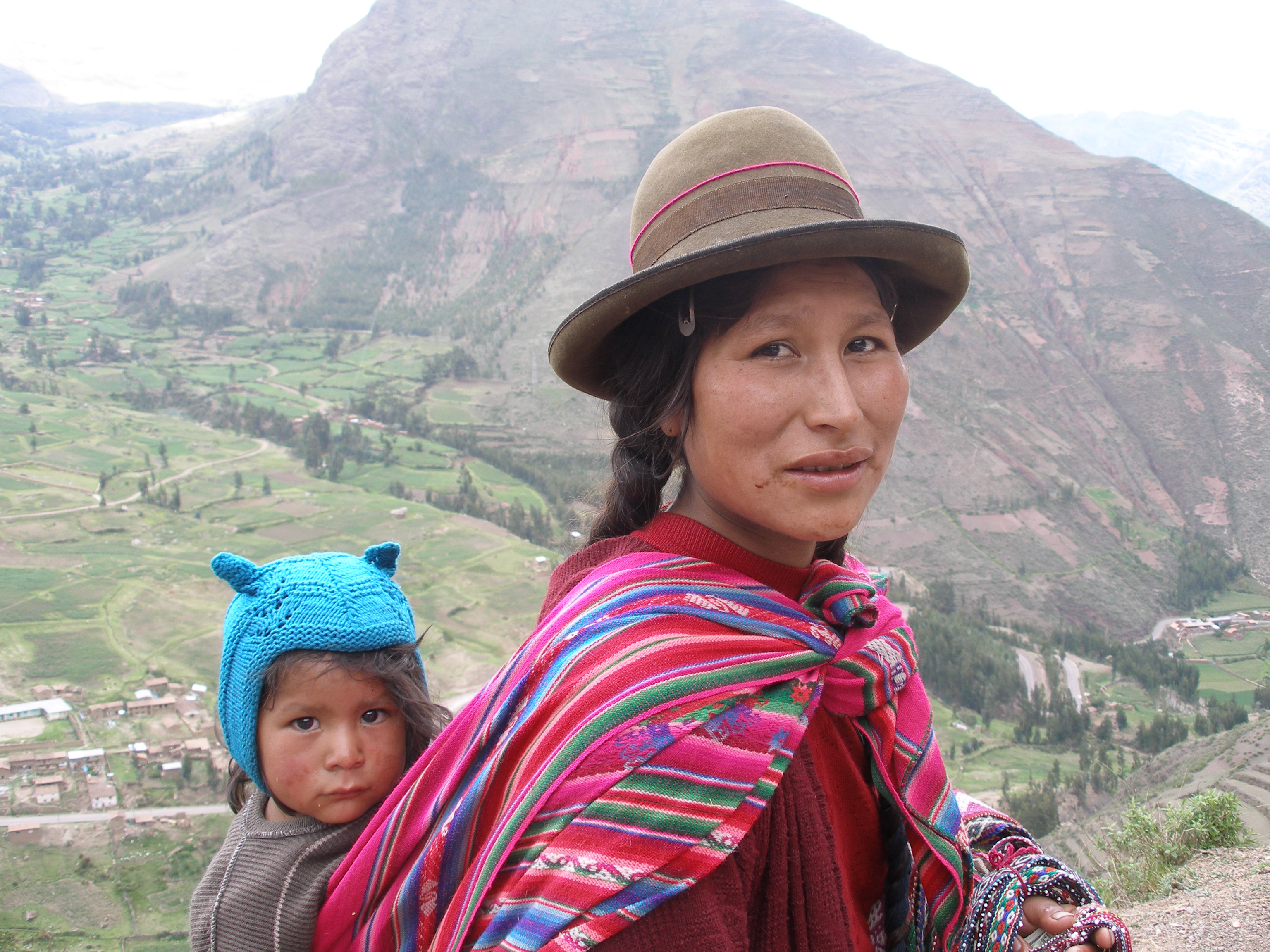
Quechua woman and child in the Sacred Valley

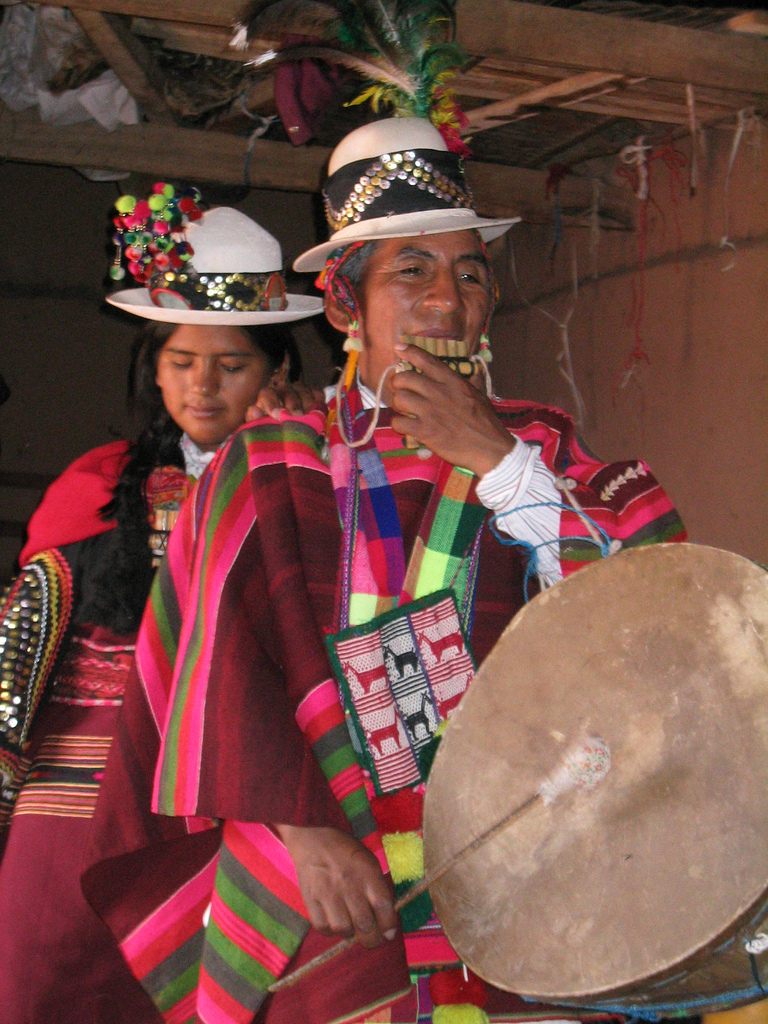
Quechua person playing siku panpipe and caja drum in Sucre

Despite their ethnic diversity and linguistic distinctions, the various Quechua ethnic groups have numerous cultural characteristics in common. They also share many of these with the Aymara or other Indigenous peoples of the central Andes.

Traditionally, Quechua identity is locally oriented and inseparably linked in each case with the established economic system. It is based on agriculture in the lower altitude regions, and on pastoral farming in the higher regions of the Puna. The typical Andean community extends over several altitude ranges and thus includes the cultivation of a variety of arable crops and/or livestock. The land is usually owned by the local community (ayllu) and is either cultivated jointly or redistributed annually.

Beginning with the colonial era and intensifying after the South American states had gained their independence, large landowners appropriated all or most of the land and forced the Native population into bondage (known in Ecuador as Huasipungo, from Kichwa wasipunku, "front door"). Harsh conditions of exploitation repeatedly led to revolts by the Indigenous farmers, which were forcibly suppressed. The largest of these revolts occurred in 1780–1781 under the leadership of Husiy Qawriyil Kunturkanki (Túpac Amaru II).

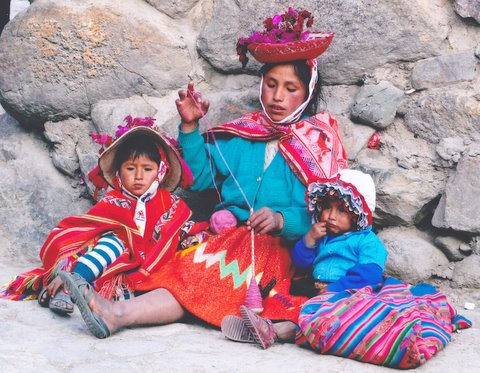
Quechua woman spinning wool in Peru, with children

Some Indigenous farmers re-occupied their ancestors' lands and expelled the landlords during the takeover of governments by dictatorships in the middle of the 20th century, such as in 1952 in Bolivia (Víctor Paz Estenssoro) and 1968 in Peru (Juan Velasco Alvarado). The agrarian reforms included the expropriation of large landowners. In Bolivia, there was a redistribution of the land to the Indigenous population as their private property. This disrupted traditional Quechua and Aymara culture based on communal ownership, but ayllus has been retained up to the present time in remote regions, such as in the Peruvian Quechua community of Q'ero. The struggle for land rights continues up to the present time to be a political focal point of everyday Quechua life. The Kichwa ethnic groups of Ecuador which are part of the ECUARUNARI association were recently able to regain communal land titles or the return of estates—in some cases through militant activity. Especially the case of the community of Sarayaku has become well known among the Kichwa of the lowlands, who after years of struggle were able to successfully resist expropriation and exploitation of the rain forest for petroleum recovery.

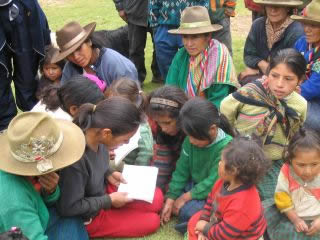
Quechuas from Conchucos, in Ancash, Peru.

A distinction is made between two primary types of joint work. In the case of mink'a, people work together for projects of common interest (such as the construction of communal facilities). Ayni is, in contrast, reciprocal assistance, whereby members of an ayllu help a family to accomplish a large private project, for example, house construction, and in turn can expect to be similarly helped later with a project of their own.

In almost all Quechua ethnic groups, many traditional handicrafts are an important aspect of material culture. This includes a tradition of weaving handed down from Inca times or earlier, using cotton, wool (from llamas, alpacas, guanacos, and vicuñas), and a multitude of natural dyes, and incorporating numerous woven patterns (pallay). Houses are usually constructed using air-dried clay bricks (tika, or in Spanish adobe), or branches and clay mortar ("wattle and daub"), with the roofs being covered with straw, reeds, or puna grass (ichu).

The disintegration of the traditional economy, for example, regionally through mining activities and accompanying proletarian social structures, has usually led to a loss of both ethnic identity and the Quechua language. This is also a result of steady migration to large cities (especially Lima), which has resulted in acculturation by Hispanic society there.

== Foods and crops ==
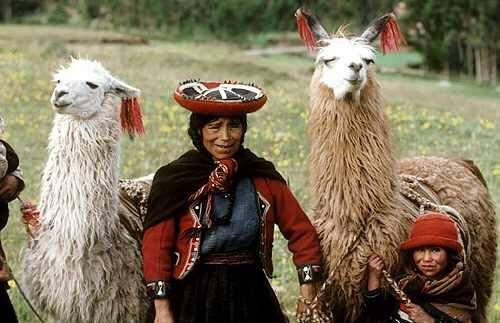
Quechua woman with llamas in the Department of Cuzco

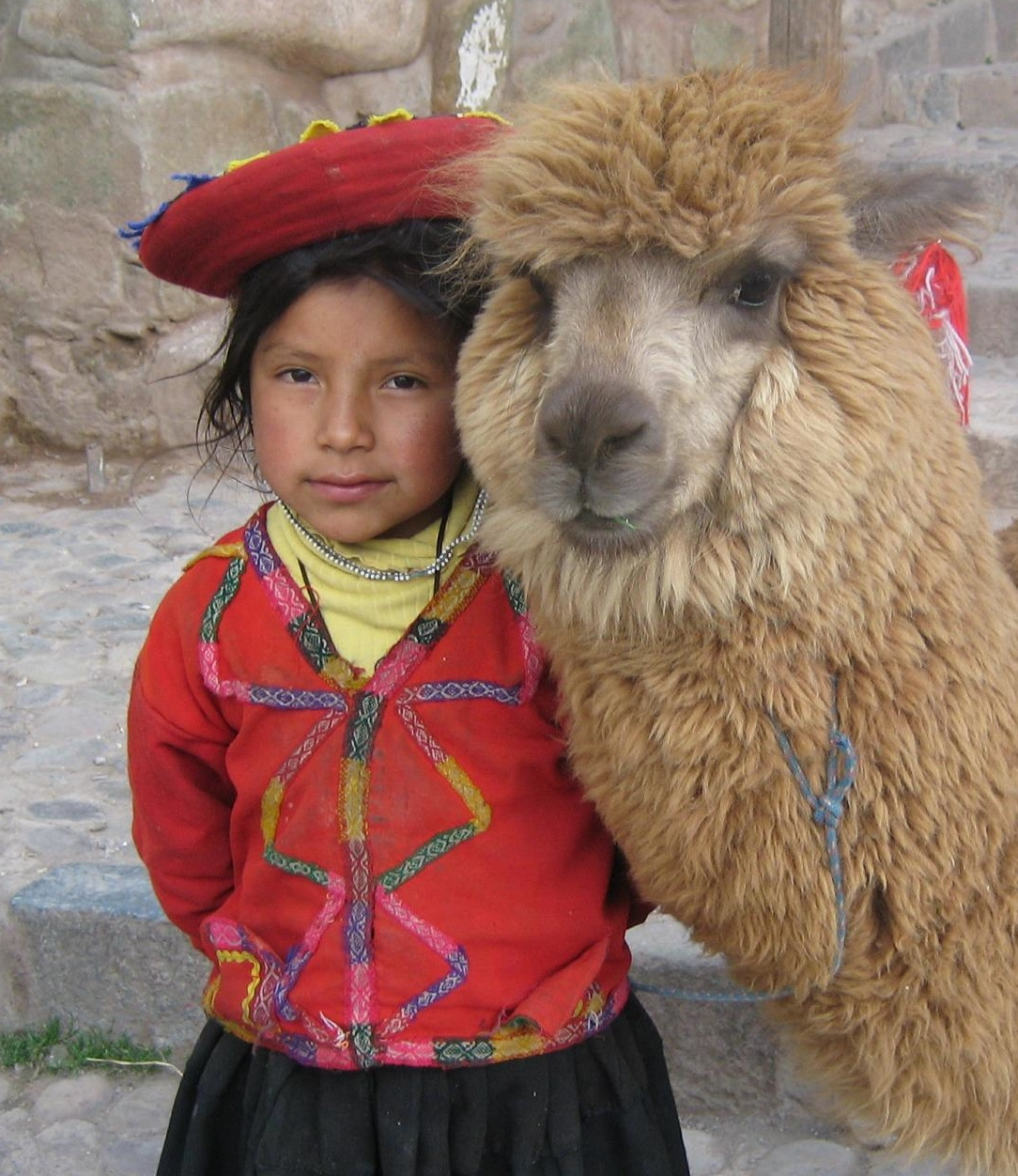
Girl, wearing indigenous clothing, with llama near Plaza de Armas in Cusco

Quechua people cultivate and eat a variety of foods. They domesticated potatoes, which originated in the region, and cultivated thousands of potato varieties, which are used for food and medicine. Climate change is threatening their potato and other traditional crops but they are undertaking conservation and adaptation efforts. Quinoa is another staple crop grown by the Quechua people. Ch’arki (the origin of the English word jerky) is a dried (and sometimes salted) meat. It was traditionally made from llama meat that was sun- and freeze-dried in the Andean sun and cold nights, but is now also often made from horse and beef, with variation among countries.

Pachamanca, a Quechua word for a pit cooking technique used in Peru, includes several types of meat such as chicken, beef, pork, lamb, and/or mutton; tubers such as potatoes, sweet potatoes, yucca, uqa/ok’a (oca in Spanish), and mashwa; other vegetables such as maize/corn and fava beans; seasonings; and sometimes cheese in a small pot and/or tamales.

Guinea pigs are also raised for meat. Other foods and crops include the meat of llamas and alpacas as well as beans, barley, hot peppers, coriander, and peanuts.

== Recent persecution ==
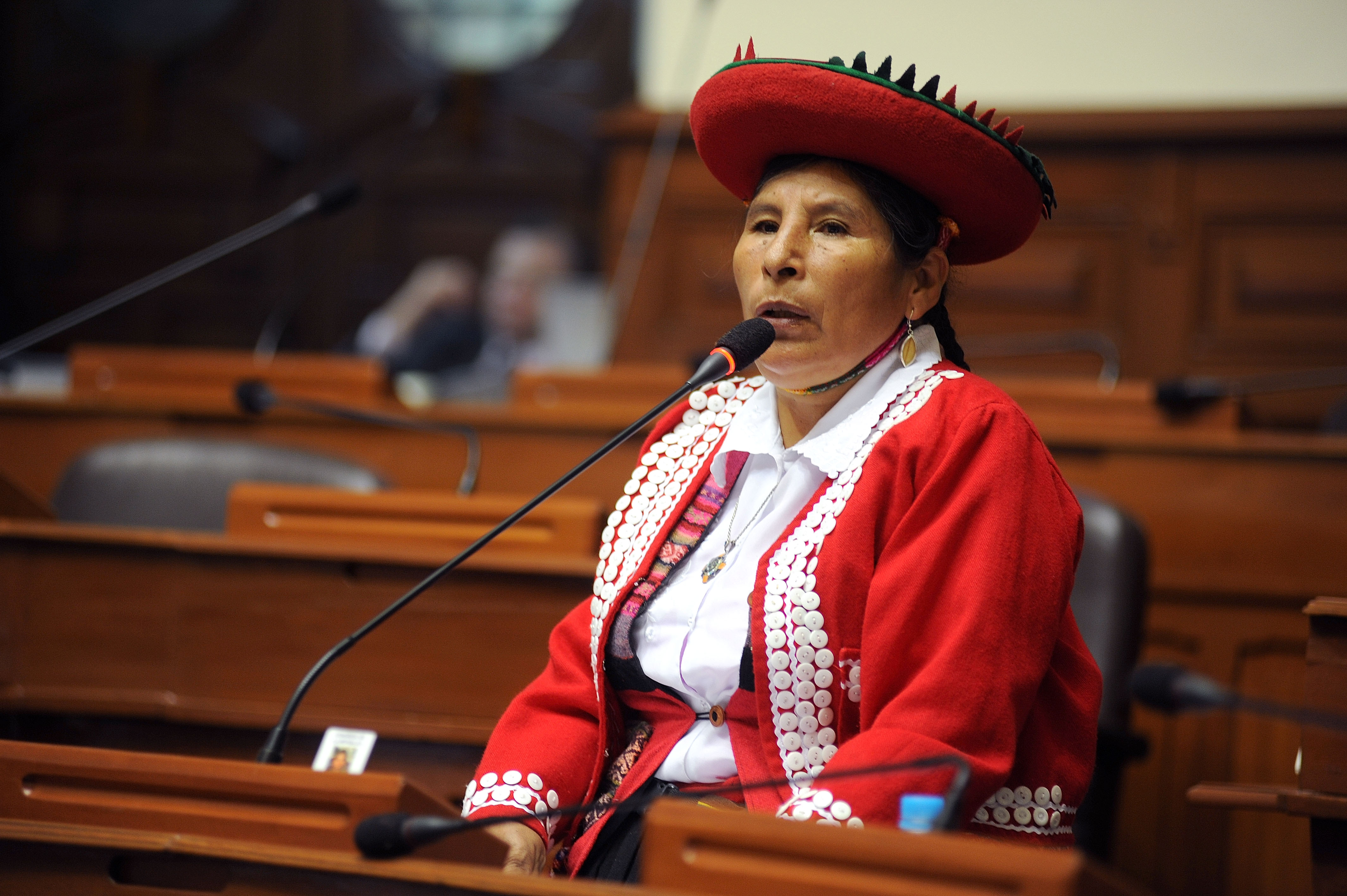
Hilaria Supa, human rights activist and Peruvian politician

In the present day, Quechuas continue to be victims of political conflicts and ethnic persecution. In the internal conflict in Peru in the 1980s between the government and Sendero Luminoso about three-quarters of the estimated 70,000 death toll were Quechuas, whereas the war parties were without exception whites and mestizos (people with mixed descent from both Natives and Spaniards).

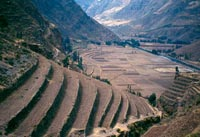
Terraces or cultivation platforms in the Andes.

The forced sterilization policy under Peruvian president Alberto Fujimori affected almost exclusively Quechua and Aymara women, a total of about 270,000 (and 22,000 men) according to official figures. The sterilization program lasted for over five years between 1996 and 2001. During this period, women were coerced into forced sterilization. Sterilizations were often performed under dangerous and unsanitary conditions, as the doctors were pressured to perform operations under unrealistic government quotas, which made it impossible to properly inform women and receive their consent. The Bolivian film director Jorge Sanjinés dealt with the issue of forced sterilization in 1969 in his Quechua-language feature film Yawar Mallku.

Quechuas have been left out of their nation's regional economic growth in recent years. The World Bank has identified eight countries on the continent to have some of the highest inequality rates in the world. The Quechuas have been subject to these severe inequalities, as many of them have a much lower life expectancy than the regional average, and many communities lack access to basic health services.

Perceived ethnic discrimination continues to play a role at the parliamentary level. When the newly elected Peruvian members of parliament Hilaria Supa Huamán and María Sumire swore their oath of office in Quechua—for the first time in the history of Peru in an Indigenous language—the Peruvian parliamentary president Martha Hildebrandt and the parliamentary officer Carlos Torres Caro refused their acceptance.

== Mythology ==
Practically all Quechuas in the Andes have been nominally Catholic since colonial times. Nevertheless, traditional religious forms persist in many regions, blended with Christian elements – a fully integrated syncretism. Quechua ethnic groups also share traditional religions with other Andean peoples, particularly belief in Mother Earth (Pachamama), who grants fertility and to whom burnt offerings and libations are regularly made. Also important are the mountain spirits (apu) as well as lesser local deities (wak'a), who are still venerated especially in southern Peru.

The Quechuas came to terms with their repeated historical experience of tragedy in the form of various myths. These include the figure of Nak'aq or Pishtaco ("butcher"), the white murderer who sucks out the fat from the bodies of the Indigenous peoples he kills, and a song about a bloody river. In their myth of Wiraquchapampa, the Q'ero people describe the victory of the Apus over the Spaniards. Of the myths still alive today, the Inkarrí myth common in southern Peru is especially interesting; it forms a cultural element linking the Quechua groups throughout the region from Ayacucho to Cusco. Some Quechuas consider classic products of the region such as corn beer, chicha, coca leaves, and local potatoes as having a religious significance, but this belief is not uniform across communities.

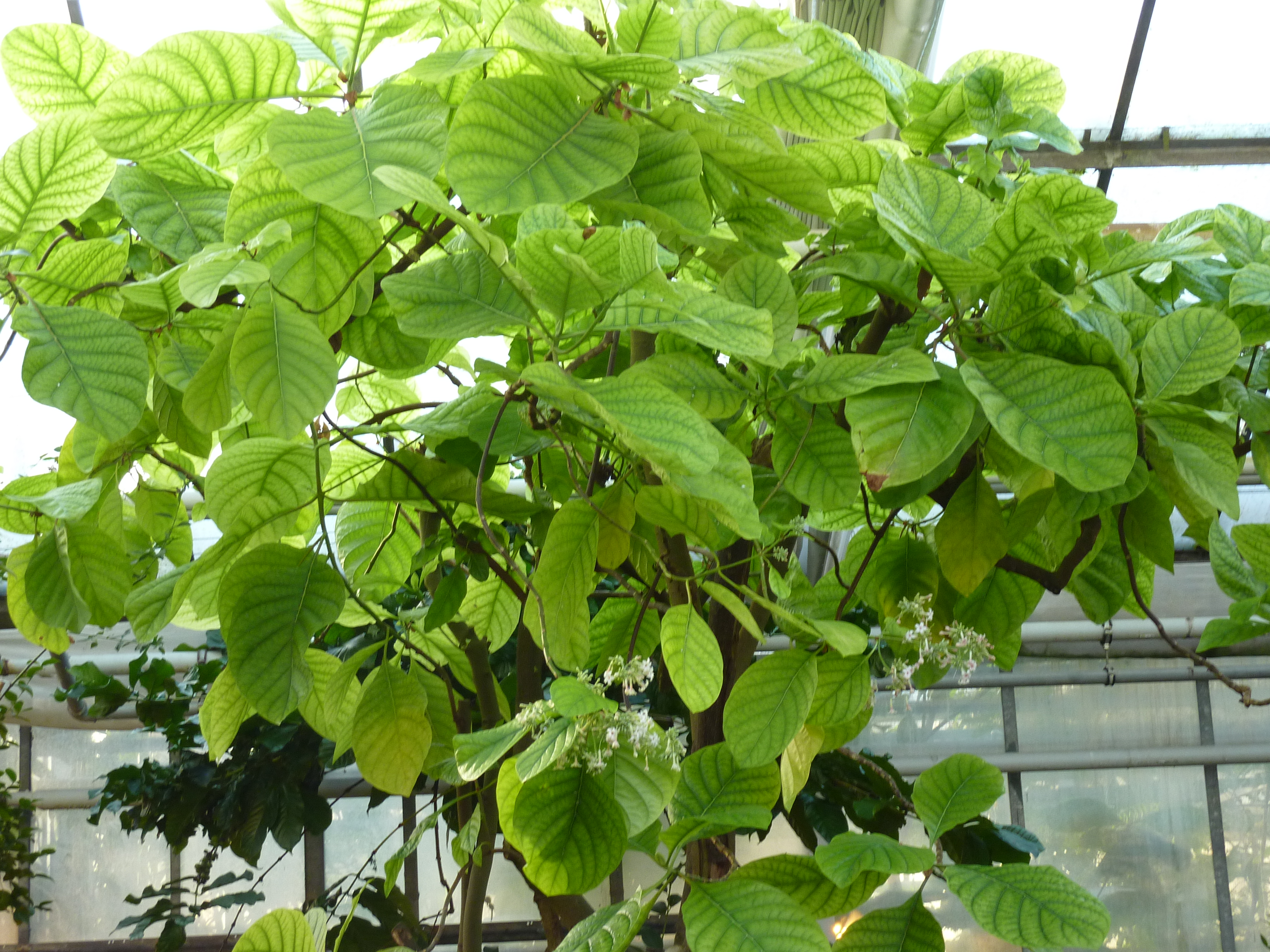
Cinchona officinalis, Peru.

== Contribution in modern medicine ==
Quinine, which is found naturally in the bark of the cinchona tree, is known to be used by Quechuas people for malaria-like symptoms.

When chewed, coca acts as a mild stimulant and suppresses hunger, thirst, pain, and fatigue; it is also used to alleviate altitude sickness. Coca leaves are chewed during work in the fields as well as during breaks in construction projects in Quechua provinces. Coca leaves are the raw material from which cocaine, one of Peru's most historically important exports, is chemically extracted.

== Traditional clothing ==
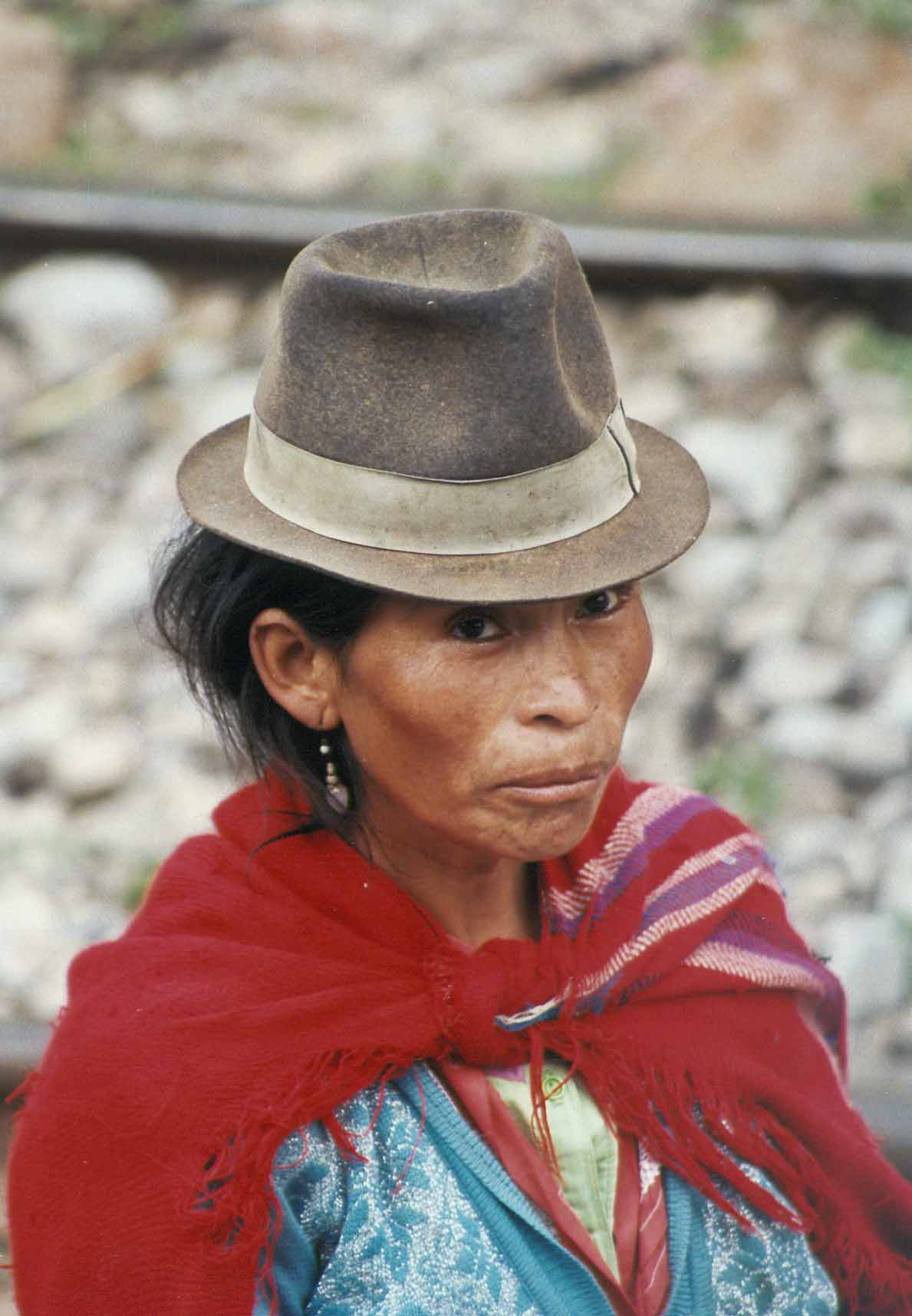
Quechua woman from Alausí, Ecuador

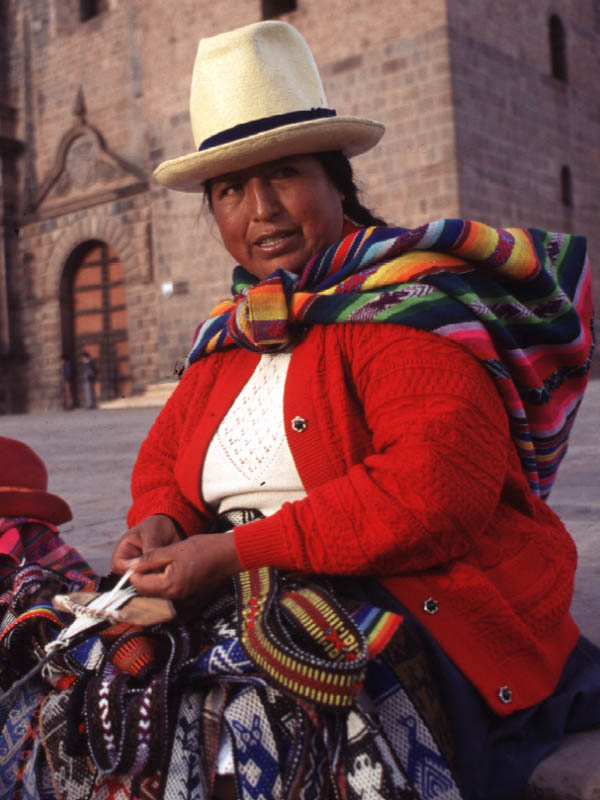
Quechua woman selling souvenirs in Cusco

Many Indigenous women wear colorful traditional attire, complete with Fedora style hat. The hat has been worn by Quechua and Aymara women since the 1920s when it was brought to the country by British railway workers. They are still commonly worn today.

The traditional dress worn by Quechua women today is a mixture of styles from Pre-Spanish days and Spanish Colonial peasant dress. Starting at puberty, Quechua girls begin wearing multiple layers of petticoats and skirts, showing off the family's wealth and making her a more desirable bride. Married women also wear multiple layers of petticoats and skirts. Younger Quechua men generally wear Western-style clothing, the most popular being synthetic football shirts and tracksuit trousers. In certain regions, women also generally wear Western-style clothing. Older men still wear dark wool knee-length handwoven bayeta pants. A woven belt called a chumpi which protects the lower back when working in the fields is also worn. Men's fine dress includes a woolen waistcoat, similar to a sleeveless juyuna as worn by women but referred to as a chaleco, and often richly decorated.

The most distinctive part of men's clothing is the handwoven poncho. Nearly every Quechua man and boy has a poncho, generally red decorated with intricate designs. Each district has a distinctive pattern. In some communities such as Huilloc, Patacancha, and many villages in the Lares Valley ponchos are worn as daily attire. However, most men use their ponchos on special occasions such as festivals, village meetings, weddings, etc.

As with the women, ajotas, sandals made from recycled tires, are the standard footwear. They are cheap and durable.

A ch'ullu, a knitted hat with earflaps, is frequently worn. The first ch'ullu that a child receives is traditionally knitted by their father. In the Ausangate region, chullos are often ornately adorned with white beads and large tassels called t'ikas. Men sometimes wear a felt hat called a sombrero over the top of the ch'ullu decorated with centillo, finely decorated hat bands. Since ancient times men have worn small woven pouches called ch'uspa used to carry their coca leaves.

== Quechua-speaking ethnic groups ==
The current distribution of the Quechuan languages (solid gray) and the historical extent of the Inca Empire, Tawantinsuyu (shaded)

The following list of Quechua ethnic groups is only a selection and delimitations vary. In some cases, these are village communities of just a few hundred people, in other cases ethnic groups of over a million.

- Inca (historic)

=== Peru ===
==== Lowlands ====
- Kichwa-Lamista
- Southern Pastaza Quechua

==== Highlands ====
- Huanca
- Chanka
- Q'ero
- Taquile
- Amantaní
- Anqaras
- Huaylas
- Piscopampas
- Huaris
- Sihuas
- Ocros
- Yauyos
- Yarus

=== Ecuador ===
==== Highlands ====
- Otavalos
- Salasaca
- Puruha
- Cañari
- Panzaleo

==== Lowlands ====
- Quijos-Quichua
- Amazonian Kichwas

=== Bolivia ===
- Kolla
- Kallawaya

=== Colombia ===
- Inga

== Notable people ==
- Túpac Amaru II, revolutionary
- Angélica Mendoza de Ascarza, Peruvian human rights activist
- Kimberly Barzola, American community organizer and artist
- Benjamin Bratt, American actor
- Manco Cápac, Sapa Inca
- Luzmila Carpio, Bolivian musician
- Andrónico Rodríguez, Bolivian trade unionist and politician
- Martín Chambi, Peruvian photographer
- Renata Flores Rivera, Peruvian musician
- Oswaldo Guayasamín, Ecuadorian painter
- Ollanta Humala, former president of Peru
- Antauro Humala, Peruvian ethnocacerist
- Josh Keaton, American actor
- Q'orianka Kilcher, American actress
- Nancy Iza Moreno, Kichwa leader
- Leonidas Iza, Ecuadorian activist and Indigenous leader
- Delfín Quishpe, Ecuadorian musician and politician
- Tarcila Rivera Zea, Peruvian activist
- Izkia Siches, Chilean physician and politician
- Magaly Solier, Peruvian actress and musician
- Diego Quispe Tito, painter
- Francisco Tito Yupanqui, sculptor
- Alejandro Toledo, former president of Peru
- Edison Flores, Peruvian footballer
- Renato Tapia, Peruvian footballer
- Tania Pariona Tarqui, Peruvian politician

== See also ==
- Andean textiles
- Chakitaqlla
- Chinchaypujio District
- Chuspas
- Indigenous peoples in Argentina
- Indigenous peoples in Bolivia
- Indigenous peoples in Ecuador
- Indigenous peoples of Peru
- Inkarrí
- Kichwa
- Quechuan languages
- Secret of the Incas, movie with conversation and singing in Quechua
- Sumak kawsay
- Yanantin
