= Hilaria Supa =

Peruvian politician

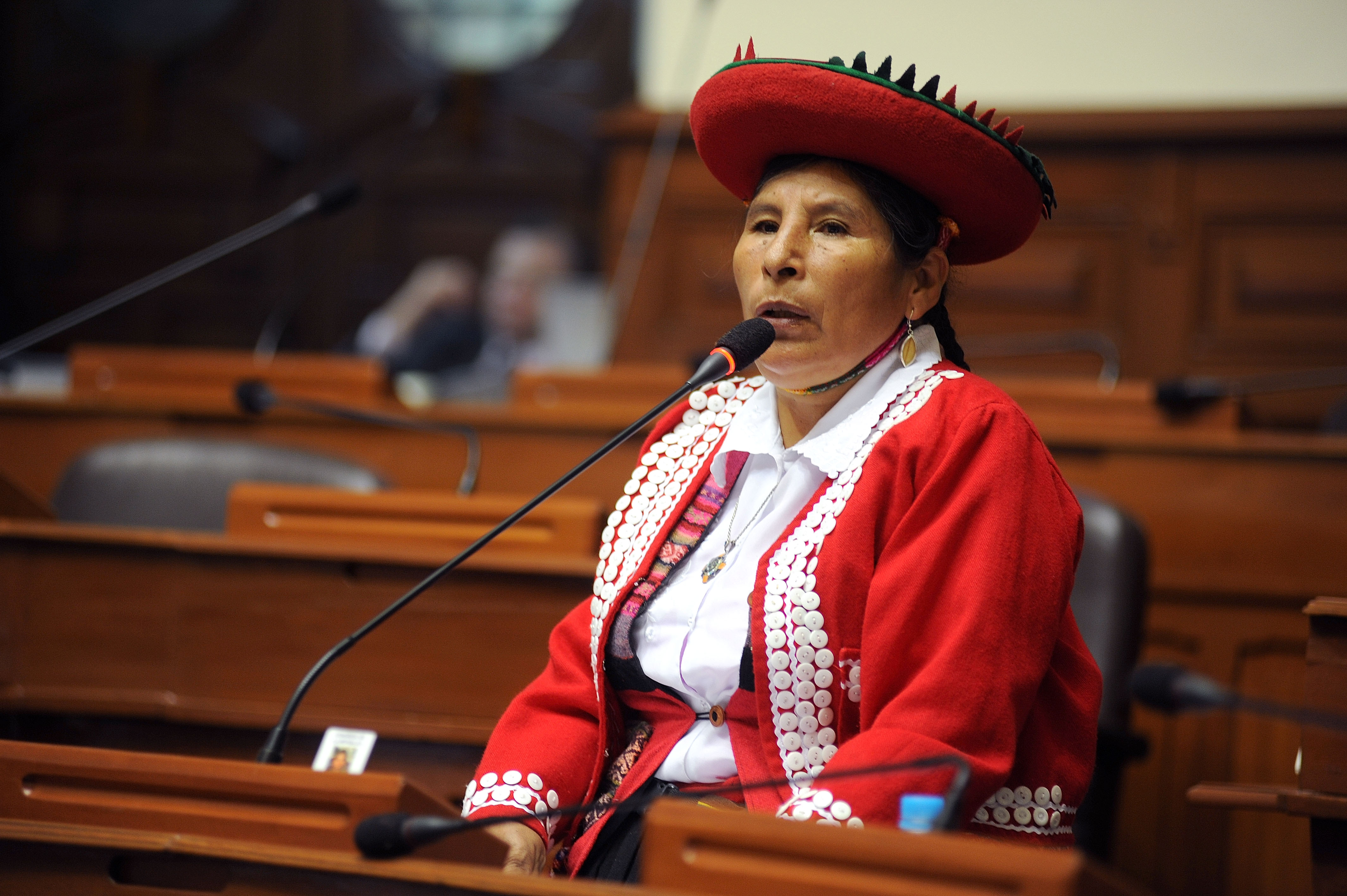

Peruvian Representative to the Andean Parliament
- In office 2011–2016

Member of the Congress
- In office July 26, 2006 – July 26, 2011
- Constituency: Cusco

Personal details
- Born: 28 December 1957 (age 68) Anta, Cusco, Peru
- Party: Partido Nacionalista Peruano

Hilaria Supa Huamán (born 28 December 1957) is a Peruvian politician, human rights activist, and an active member of several Indigenous women's organizations in Peru and around the world. She was a Congresswoman representing Cusco from 2006 to 2011, as a member of Ollanta Humala's Partido Nacionalista Peruano party.

== Early life ==
Hilaria Supa was raised by her grandparents on her mother Helena Huamán's side, who were peasants in a hacienda, or a big farm owned by rich families.

During her childhood she saw the hacendado (farm owner) mistreat her grandfather and rape the local women, which had a crucial impact on her life. Her grandfather, who fought for farmers' rights, was murdered in 1965.

When she was only six years old, she had to travel to Arequipa, where she was forced to work as a maid. When she asked her relatives to get her back to Cusco, she found out that her grandmother had also died.

Afterward Hilaria Supa worked as a house maid in Cusco, Arequipa, and Lima. She was raped at 14 when she was working for rich families in Lima. Her partner and father of her children died in an accident when she was 22. As a result of physical abuse and forced labor as a child, she suffers from generalized body arthritis. She has written a book about her life titled Threads of My Life, available in Spanish, English and German, and soon in Quechua. She writes about how she became stronger by facing these adversities.

== Activism ==
In the 1980s she became involved with other Indigenous women in organizing a community program that provided poor children with free meals. She became leader of the Micaela Bastidas Committee in Anta, Cusco and took part in the fights for land rights. The land rights movement finally resulted in land reform legislation under the government of Juan Velasco Alvarado. She was also the leader of the Federación Departamental de Campesinos del Cusco, the regional organization of the Confederación Campesina del Perú in Cusco.

In 1991, she became the Organizational Secretary of the newly founded Women's Federation of Anta (Federación de Mujeres de Anta FEMCA), where she was responsible for literacy programs, traditional medicine preservation, and pesticide issues.

Hilaria Supa has taken part in numerous international women's rights meetings, where she has actively used and promoted her Native Quechua language. In 1995, she led a protest against forced sterilization of women and men, done under the Alberto Fujimori dictatorship with health minister Alejandro Aguinaga. This racist health policy resulted in forced sterilization of 272,000 Indigenous women and over 22,000 men.

== Political career ==
Hilaria Supa was elected to the Peruvian Congress in 2006, taking the oath in Quechua, followed by her fellow Congresswoman María Sumire. She became the first parliamentarian in Peru's history to take the oath in any Indigenous language, for which both were sharply criticized by Congresswoman Martha Hildebrandt and some other members of Congress.

Congresswoman Hilaria Supa participated twice at the United Nations Permanent Forum on Indigenous Issues, where she denounced the crisis that her community was facing, after the Alan García administration passed free trade policies and abusive decrees in complicity with the U.S. government. She is working now to rescue Machu Picchu and other Native sites, and to return them to the management of the Indigenous peoples of Cusco.

In August 2010, Hilaria Supa was elected president of the Education Commission of the Peruvian Congress. While congressmen of the American Popular Revolutionary Alliance (APRA) and the Fujimori parties were criticizing this, she received support by Peruvian education experts.

In April 2011, Hilaria Supa was elected as a Representative of Gana Perú into the Andean Parliament.

== Works ==
- Hilos de mi vida – el testimonio de Hilaria Supa Huamán, una campesina Quechua. Willkamayu Editores, Lima 2002 (Spanish).
- Threads of My Life - The Story of Hilaria Supa Huaman, A Rural Quechua Woman. Theytus Books, B.C., Canada. 2008.
