= Estuardo Núñez Hague =

Peruvian writer, literary critic, historian and professor

- Born: September 5, 1908
- Died: August 29, 2013 (aged 104)
- Education: National University of San Marcos
- Occupation: Writer

Estuardo Núñez Hague (5 September 1908 – 29 August 2013) was a Peruvian writer, literary critic, historian and university professor. He was considered to be the “founder of modern poetry in Peru."

== Biography ==
Estuardo Núñez was born in Chorrillos in 1908, although he later moved to the nearby Barranco. He was the son of Colonel Maximiliano Núñez Delgado de la Flor and Rosa Hague. At the age of five he began to learn to read on an Underwood Typewriter, using it to recognize and then type the letters of the alphabet.

He studied at the local German-language school, where he was classmates with Martín Adán. Throughout his school years, he frequented intellectual environments and eventually met poet José María Eguren and José Carlos Mariategui, who encouraged him to begin writing. As a young adult he studied literature at the National University of San Marcos, where he participated in different student movements. He graduated with a Doctorate of Letters in 1932 and a Law Degree in 1937. After graduation, he worked as a professor at the Colegio San Andrés and chaired the Literary Theory and Comparative Literature departments at the National University of San Marcos. He eventually became Director of the Literature and Linguistics programs there. In addition to his academic activities in Peru, he was a visiting professor at New York University, the University of Bonn, and the Grenoble Alpes University.

He was married to the painter and writer Cota Carvallo, with whom he had seven children.

In 1967 he was appointed Director of the National Library of Peru. In that role he was responsible for publishing Peruvian classics, as well as the reconstruction and reopening of the Library, which had remained unfinished since a fire in 1943.

He was also Director of the Peruvian Academy of Language from 1988 to 1991 and was a member of Peru's National Academy of History. He was President of the Inca Garcilaso de la Vega Cultural Center and a member of the National Commission for the celebration of the Centenary of the Discovery of America.

== Works ==
- Peru as seen by travelers
- The Poetry of Eguren (1933)
- Current Panorama of Peruvian Poetry (1937)
- Germanic authors in Peru (1953)
- English and American authors in Peru (1956).
- Peruvian Literature in the 20th Century (Mexico, 1965)
- The letters of Italy in Peru (Lima, UNMSM, 1968).
- The New Olavide (1970)
- The Image of the World in Peruvian Literature (1971)
- Bolivar, Ayacucho and the Peruvian Traditionalists (1974)
- Spain as Seen by Hispanic American Travelers (1985)
- Brazil as seen by Peruvian travelers (1981)
- Travel and foreign travelers in Peru (1989)
- Ricardo Palma, continental writer (1990)
- The Peruvian Traditionalists (2001)

He also wrote several essays and articles on Andrés Bello's linguistic theories.

== Awards and recognition ==
- Cross of Merit for Distinguished Services of the Republic of Peru (1971)
- Cross of Merit and Alexander von Humboldt Medal of the Federal Republic of Germany
- Order of Merit of the Republic of Italy
- Order of the Liberator of the Republic of Venezuela
- Order of Andrés Bello of the Republic of Venezuela
- Order of the Sun of Peru, Great Cross
- Medal of Honor of the Congress of the Republic of Peru
- National Prize for the Promotion of Culture (1957)
- El Ateneo de Buenos Aires Award (1971)
- José de la Riva-Agüero y Osma Award, Southern Peru- Pontificia Universidad Católica del Perú
- Professor Emeritus of the Universidad Mayor de San Marcos
- Doctor Honoris Causa from Ricardo Palma University
- Doctor Honoris Causa from the National University of Engineering (2007)
- Honorary Professor of:
  - San Luis Gonzaga de Ica National University
  - National University of Huanuco
  - Santa Maria Catholic University of Arequipa

== See also ==
- Peruvian Literature
