= Peruvian Academy of Language =

Spanish language academy in Peru

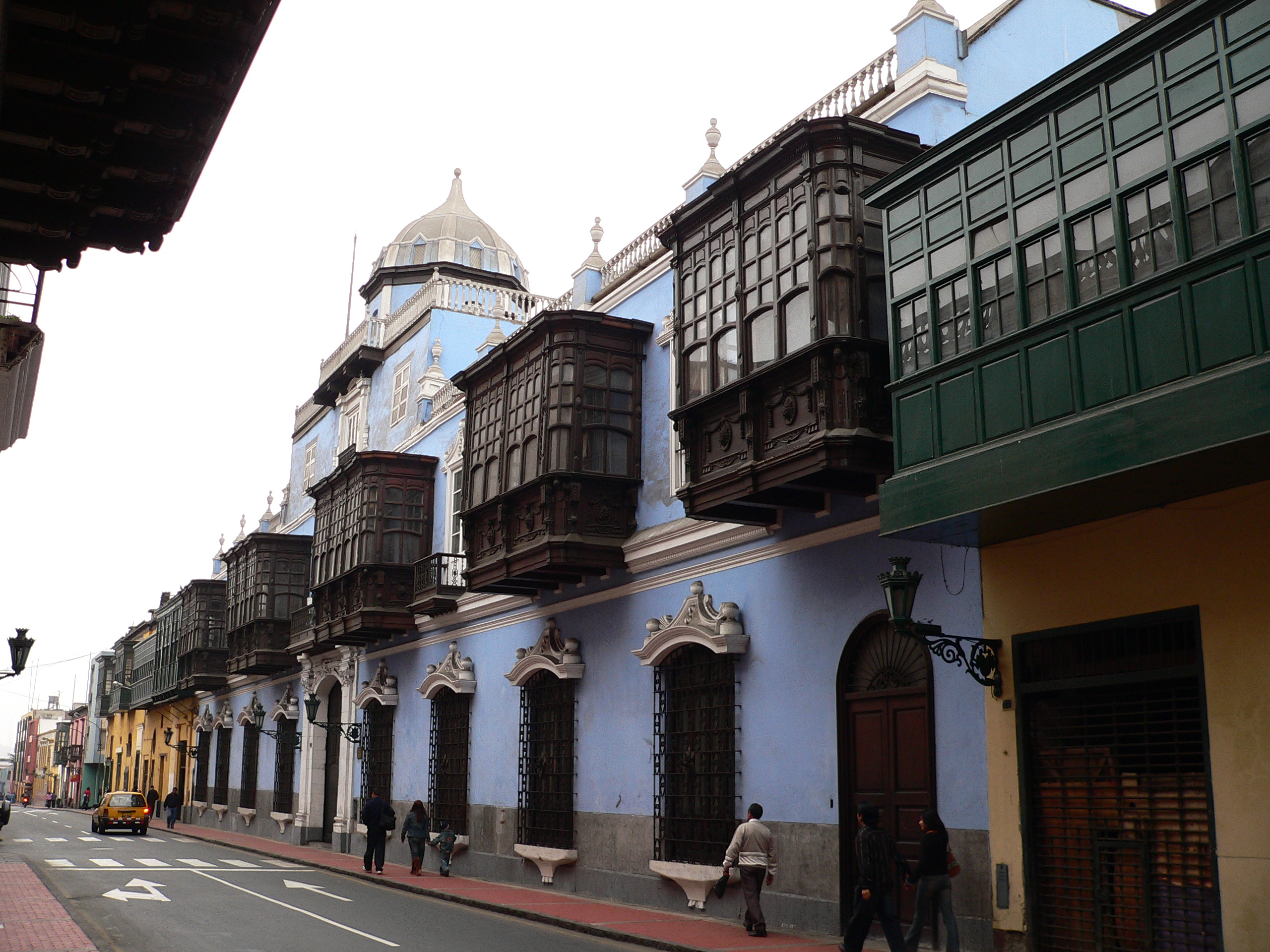
- Osambela House (in blue), headquarters of the APL.
- Abbreviation: APL
- Founded: May 5, 1887; 139 years ago
- Type: Spanish Language Academy
- Location: Lima, Peru
- Region served: Spanish-speaking world
- President: Harry Belevan
- Website: apl.org.pe

The Peruvian Academy of Language or …of the Language (Academia Peruana de la Lengua, APL) is a cultural institution that brings together literary figures, writers, poets, linguists, and scholars specializing in the use of the Spanish language in Peru. It is a collective member of the Association of Spanish Language Academies.

== Establishment ==
It was established in Lima on 5 May 1887 as a corresponding academy to the Real Academia Española. On 30 August of the same year, its first public session was held in the assembly hall of the National University of San Marcos, where Francisco García Calderón, a former President of Peru, was elected as its first president.

Although it was formally established in 1887, its inauguration had been delayed due to the War of the Pacific: during the Chilean occupation of Lima, a large portion of the books from the National Library of Peru were taken to Chile as war spoils. This event led Ricardo Palma to prioritize the reconstruction of the National Library, setting aside earlier plans to inaugurate the APL.

García Calderón was succeeded by Ricardo Palma, first as president and later as director. Palma was a staunch defender of peruanismos (Peru-specific Spanish usages), which he documented in his works Papeletas lexicográficas and Neologismos y americanismos, and lobbied the Real Academia Española to formally accept them.

Among its members is Mario Vargas Llosa, recipient of the Premio Cervantes (1994) and the Nobel Prize in Literature (2010), who also held a seat at the Real Academia Española. Other notable members have included Víctor Andrés Belaúnde, Guillermo Hoyos Osores, Augusto Tamayo Vargas, Luis Jaime Cisneros, and Aurelio and Francisco Miró Quesada. In the field of Quechua linguistics as it relates to Peruvian Spanish, Rodolfo Cerrón-Palomino has been a key contributor, while Martha Hildebrandt specialised in peruanismos — particularly Lima-specific usages and archaisms — publishing her findings in the Lima newspaper El Comercio.

The current president is Harry Belevan, elected to succeed Eduardo Hopkins Rodríguez.

The Academy hosted the VIII International Congress of the Association of Spanish Language Academies in 1980.

== Members ==
=== Full members (Académicos de número) ===
Member	Admitted	Profession	Birth year	Birthplace	Notes
Martha Hildebrandt Pérez-Treviño	1971	Linguist, politician	1925	La Libertad	Permanent Secretary 1993–2005
Mario Vargas Llosa	1975	Writer	1936	Arequipa	
Carlos Germán Belli	1980	Writer	1927	Lima	
Manuel Pantigoso Pecero	1982	Poet, literary critic	1936	Lima	
Rodolfo Cerrón-Palomino	1991	Linguist	1940	Junín	
Gustavo Gutiérrez Merino	1995	Priest, theologian	1928	Lima	
Fernando de Trazegnies Granda	1996	Lawyer, historian, genealogist	1935	Lima	
José León Herrera	1998	Philosopher, orientalist	1930	Lima	
Marco G. Martos Carrera	1999	Writer	1942	Piura	President 2006–2014 and 2018–2022
Ricardo González Vigil	2000	Poet, literary critic	1949	Lima	
Ricardo Silva-Santisteban Ubillús	2001	Poet, editor, literary critic	1941	Lima	President 2014–2017
Eduardo Hopkins Rodríguez	2005	—	—	—	President 2022–2025
Salomón Lerner Febres	2006	Philosopher	1944	Lima	
Alberto Varillas Montenegro	2008	Lawyer	1934	Lima	
Camilo Rubén Fernández Cozman	2008	Poet	1965	Lima	
Alonso Cueto Caballero	2009	Writer	1954	Lima	
Marcial Rubio Correa	2010	Lawyer, constitutional scholar	1948	Lima	
Harry Belevan-McBride	2012	Diplomat, writer	1945	Lima	President 2026–2029
Carlos Thorne Boas	2012	Lawyer, philosopher, novelist	1926	Lima	
Carlos Garatea Grau	2014	Philologist, linguist	1966	Lima	
Víctor Oswaldo Holguín Callo	2014	Historian	1950	Lima	
Antonio González Montes	2014	—	1949	Lima	
Eliana González Cruz	2017	Linguist	1968	Lambayeque	
Óscar Coello Cruz	2022	Poet, professor, literary critic	1947	Piura	Editor of the Boletín de la Academia Peruana de la Lengua
Jorge Antonio Valenzuela Garcés	2022	Professor, writer, literary critic	1962	Lima	
Rocío Caravedo	2023	Professor, linguist, literary researcher	—	Lima	
Luis Andrade Ciudad	2023	Professor, linguist, writer	1966	Lima	
Eduardo González Viaña	2023	Professor, writer, journalist	1941	La Libertad	
Martina Vinatea Recoba	2024	Professor, writer, poet, researcher	1962	Lima	

=== Deceased members ===
- Francisco García Calderón y Landa
- Ricardo Palma
- José de la Riva-Agüero y Osma
- Víctor Andrés Belaúnde Diez-Canseco
- Aurelio Miró Quesada Sosa
- José Jiménez Borja
- Augusto Tamayo Vargas
- Luis Alberto Sánchez Sánchez
- Estuardo Núñez Hague
- Luis Jaime Cisneros Vizquerra
- Francisco Miró-Quesada Cantuarias
- José Agustín de la Puente Candamo
- Fernando de Szyszlo Valdelomar
- Edgardo Rivera Martínez
- Martha Hildebrandt
- Ismael Pinto Vargas
- Eugenio Chang Rodríguez
- Luis Alberto Ratto Chueca
- Mario Vargas Llosa

=== Corresponding Peruvian members ===
- Alfredo Bryce Echenique
- Armando Zubizarreta
- Luis Enrique López
- Rocío Caravedo
- Julio Ortega
- Pedro Lasarte
- Juan Carlos Godenzzi
- Jesús Cabel Moscoso

=== Corresponding foreign members ===
- James Higgins
- Humberto López Morales
- Julio Calvo Pérez
- Raquel Chang-Rodríguez
- Isabelle Tauzin-Castellanos
- Inmaculada Lergo
- Pedro Lastra
- Stephen M. Hart
- Juan Jesús Armas Marcelo
- César Ferreira
- Thomas Ward

=== Honorary members ===
- Johan Leuridan Huys
- Antonio Gamoneda Lobón
- Jorge Eduardo Arellano

== Presidents ==
President	Term
Francisco García Calderón y Landa	1887–1905
Ricardo Palma	1905–1919
Javier Prado	1919–1921
José de la Riva-Agüero y Osma	1934–1944
Víctor Andrés Belaúnde Diez-Canseco	1944–1966
Aurelio Miró Quesada Sosa	1967–1979
José Jiménez Borja	1979–1982
Augusto Tamayo Vargas	1982–1988
Estuardo Núñez Hague	1988–1991
Luis Jaime Cisneros Vizquerra	1991–2005
Marco Martos Carrera	2006–2014
Ricardo Silva-Santisteban Ubillús	2014–2017
Marco Martos Carrera	2018–2022
Eduardo Hopkins Rodríguez	2022–2025
Harry Belevan	2026–2029

== See also ==
- Literature of Peru
- Association of Spanish Language Academies
- Real Academia Española
