= Marco Martos Carrera =

Peruvian poet

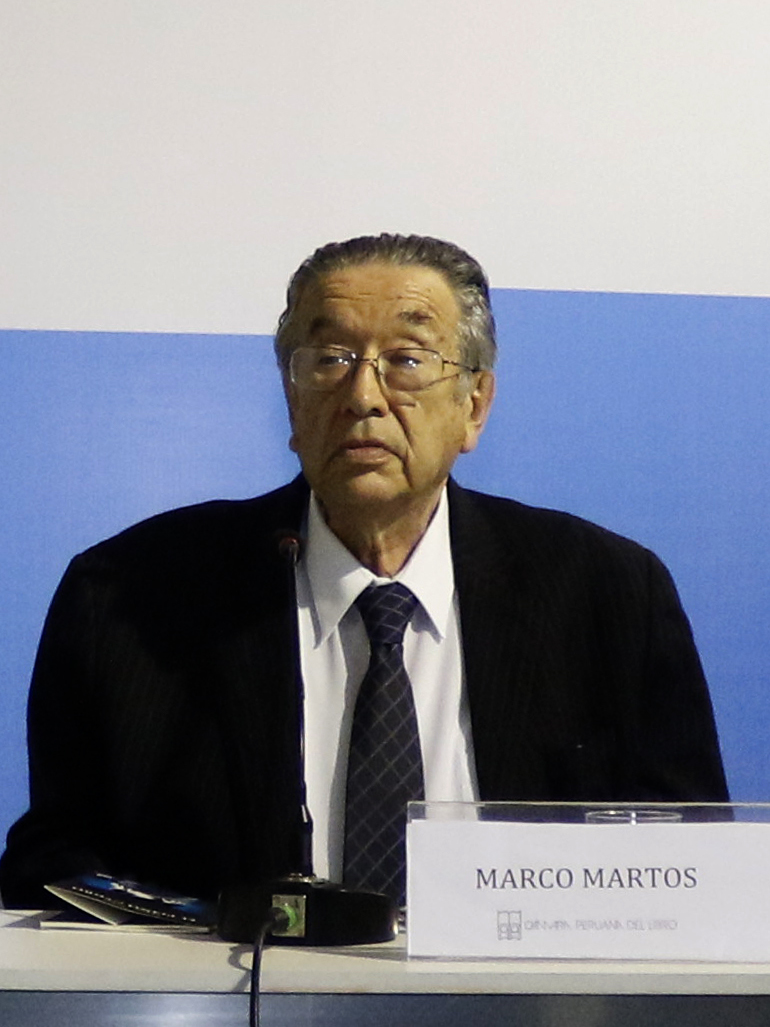
Poet Marco Martos

Marco Martos Carrera (born November 29, 1942, in Piura, Peru) is a Peruvian poet and the President of the Academia Peruana de la Lengua. He is held to be one of the most important persons of the Peruvian "60's generation". His works covers topics like 'loneliness' and 'existentialism'.

He received a PhD from the National University of San Marcos in Lima, became a professor there, and also the Director of the Graduate School of Humanities.

In 1969, he won the Nacional Award of Poetry. His poetry had been translated and published into several languages: English, French, German, Italian and Spanish.

== Works ==
=== Poetry ===
- Casa nuestra. (Our house) (Lima: Ediciones de la Rama Florida. 1965)
- Cuaderno de quejas y contentamientos. (Lima: CMB. 1969)
- Donde no se ama. (Lima: Milla Batres. 1974)
- Carpe diem. (Lima: Haraui. 1979)
- Carpe diem/El silbo de los aires amorosos. (Lima: CEPES. 1981)
- Muestra de arte rupestre. (Lima: Instituto Nacional de Cultura. 1990)
- Cabellera de Berenice. (Trujillo: SEA-Municipalidad Provincial de Trujillo-Casa del artista. 1991)
- Al leve reino. (Obra poética 1965-1996) (Lima: Peisa. 1996)
- El mar de las tinieblas. (Sea of shadows) (Lima: El Caballo Rojo-Atenea. 1999)
- Sílabas de la música. (Lima: LIRSUR. 2002)
- El monje de Praga. (Lima: Hipocampo. 2003)
- Jaque perpetuo. (Lima: Pontificia Universidad Católica del Perú. 2003)
- Dondoneo. (Lima: Universidad Nacional Mayor de San Marcos. 2004)
- Aunque es de noche. (Lima: Hipocampo. 2006)
- Poemario Dante y Virgilio. Iban oscuros en la profunda noche. (Lima: Universidad San Martín de Porres. 2008)

=== Research ===
- Las palabras de Trilce (1989)
