= Luz Salgado =

Peruvian Fujimorist politician and journalist

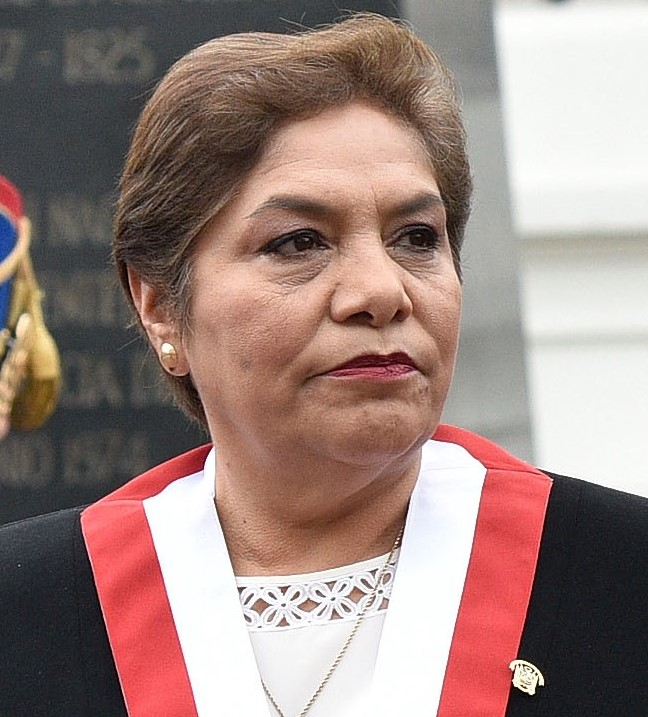
- Luz Salgado Rubianes

President of Congress
- In office 26 July 2016 – 26 July 2017
- Vice President: 1st Vice President; Rosa Bartra; 2nd Vice President; Richard Acuña; 3rd Vice President; Elías Rodríguez; Luciana León
- Preceded by: Luis Iberico Núñez
- Succeeded by: Luis Galarreta
- In office 22 November 2000 – 30 November 2000; Acting
- Preceded by: Valentín Paniagua
- Succeeded by: Francisco Tudela
- In office 13 November 2000 – 16 November 2000; Acting
- Preceded by: Martha Hildebrandt
- Succeeded by: Valentín Paniagua

Member of Congress
- In office 26 July 2011 – 16 March 2020
- Constituency: Lima
- In office 26 July 2001 – 23 August 2001
- Constituency: Lima
- In office 26 July 1995 – 26 July 2001
- Constituency: National

Member of the Democratic Constituent Congress
- In office 26 November 1992 – 26 July 1995
- Constituency: National

Personal details
- Born: 3 July 1949 (age 77) Lima, Peru
- Party: Fuerza Popular; Cambio 90–New Majority (until 2011)
- Spouse: Domingo Paredes Santolalla
- Website: Official Site

Luz Filomena Salgado Rubianes de Paredes (born 3 July 1949) is a Peruvian Fujimorist politician and journalist who served as President of the Congress thrice, from 2016 to 2017 as a full-term and twice briefly in 2000 in an acting capacity.

== Education and professional career ==
Luz Salgado studied communication sciences at the Universidad San Martín de Porres. She studied additionally for a master's degree in the Center for Higher National Studies.

== Political career ==
=== Writing the Peruvian Constitution ===
In aftermath of Alberto Fujimori's self-coup on April 5, 1992, Luz Salgado was elected as a member of the Democratic Constitutional Congress, which wrote a new constitution during the Peruvian Constitutional Crisis of 1992. During this period she worked closely with de facto Intelligence Chief Vladimiro Montesinos.

=== Congresswoman and Party politics ===
In the 1990 elections, Salgado ran for deputy for the Lima constituency under the Cambio 90 party, but she was not elected. Five years later in the 1995 elections, Salgado was elected to Congress under the Cambio 90-New Majority list. In the 2000 elections, she was re-elected on the Peru 2000 list and again in the 2001 elections under the Cambio 90-New Majority list but in August 2001, she was suspended from Congress.

In the 2011 general election, after a ten-year absence, she was elected to the Congress on the Fuerza 2011 list, representing Lima for the 2011–2016 term and in the 2016 elections on the Fuerza Popular list, for the 2016–2021 term, but her term was cut short by the dissolution of Congress by Martín Vizcarra in September 2019. At the time of her retirement, Salgado held the fifth position in seniority in the Congress of the Republic, with 17 years as a member of Congress in six non-consecutive terms.
