= Quijos-Quichua =

Amazonian ethnic group

The Quijos-Quichua (Napo-Quichua) are a Lowland Quechua (Runa Shimi) people, living in the basins of the Napo, Aguarico, San Miguel, and Putumayo river basins of Ecuador and Peru. In Ecuador they inhabit in the Napo Alto as well as the rivers Ansuy and Jatun Yacu, where they are also known as Quijos Quechua. The Quijos Original Nation (NAOKI) has an extension of community territory of approximately 13,986, 78 hectares. It was recognized as such on March 13, 2013, by Codenpe (Council of Development of Nationalities and Peoples of Ecuador). It is made up of dozens of groups, communities and organizations, according to their status.

== History ==
The Quijos are an indigenous culture group of the territory in the banks of the River Napo, in Ecuador. From them the Napo-runa are derived. The modern Quijos are Quichua speaking, but the inhabitants of the region indicate that their original language was Shillipanu. This language has become almost extinct due to the expansion of the Quichua language through the Inca empire: first due to the inter-Andean commercial relations; and then with the conquest of what is now Ecuador by the Inca empire or Tahuantinsuyo.

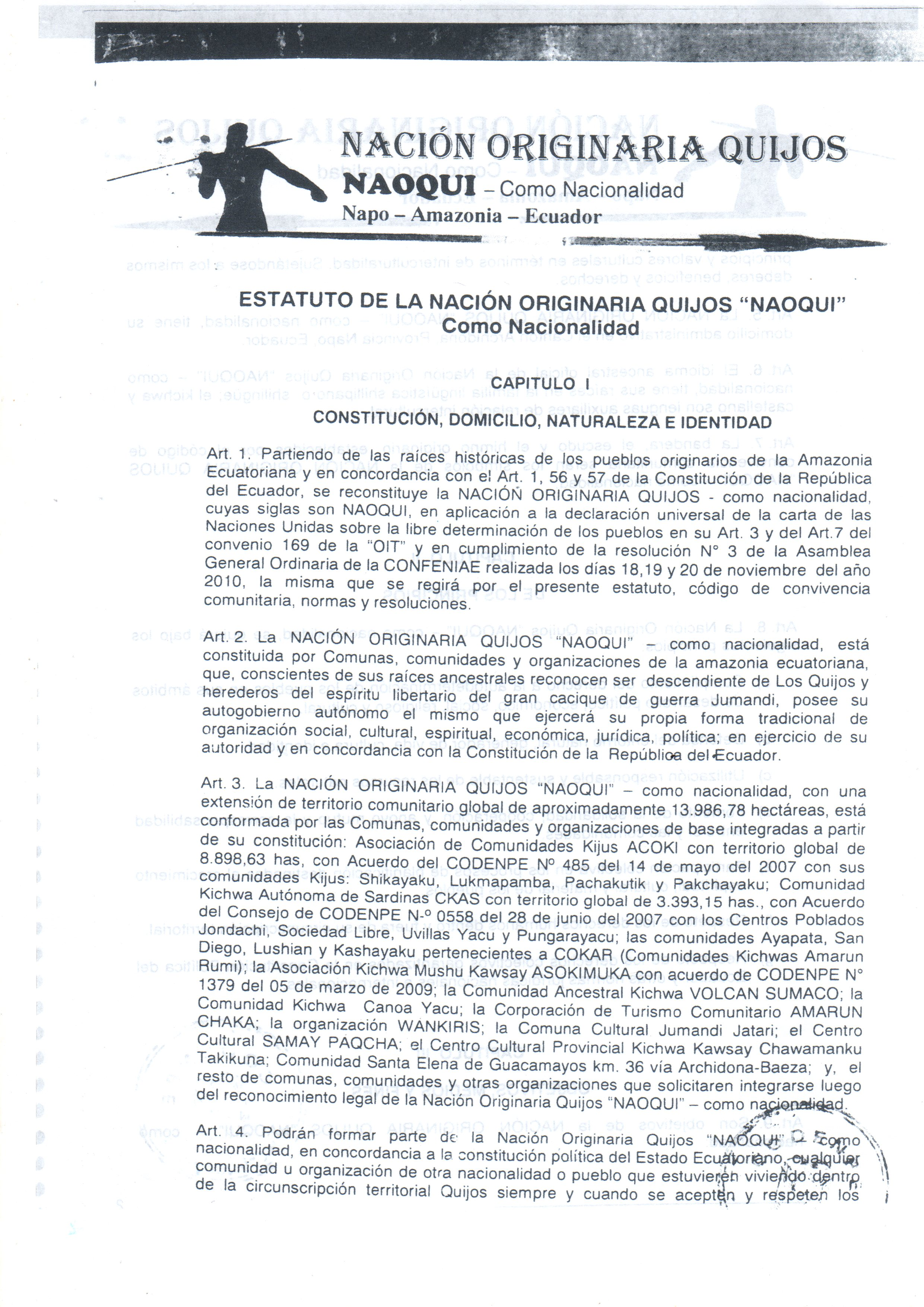
Statute of the Quijos nation

The Original Nation Quijos has its roots in the ancient indigenous Quijos that populated that region and that were almost exterminated by the Spaniards, during the time of the conquest. Their local hero is Jumandi, a warrior who fought against Spanish expansion, in the year 1578. Despite the great resistance of Jumandi and the people who followed him, the Spaniards captured him, tortured him and finally killed him in 1579.

The Quijos are now being reunited in what is the traditional Quijos Nation, which combines Quichua speaking communities, who inhabit the Ecuadorian province of Napo.

== Language ==
The researcher Wilson Gutiérrez Marín indicates that the old language of the Quijos was based on guttural sounds, that imitated the sounds of birds and animals. Nevertheless, the strong influence of the Quichua, from the Tahuantinsuyo, led to this community losing their native language. Current linguistic research reveals that there are traces of the Shillipanu language in Quichua currently spoken by the Napo-Runa or Quijos, which means that their original language was (most likely) fused with Quichua. Other researchers (Goldáraz, 2010) point out that although Quichua was not the original language of the Quijos, that it has been 'nativized' by acquiring new spatial and linguistic features.

== Traditional medicine ==
Traditional medicine making use of local plants and trees is an important part of Quijos culture. 29% of tree species are used for medicinal purposes. Examples of plants used in Quijos traditional medicine are tobacco, chilli pepper and wayusa, which is typically brewed into an infusion.

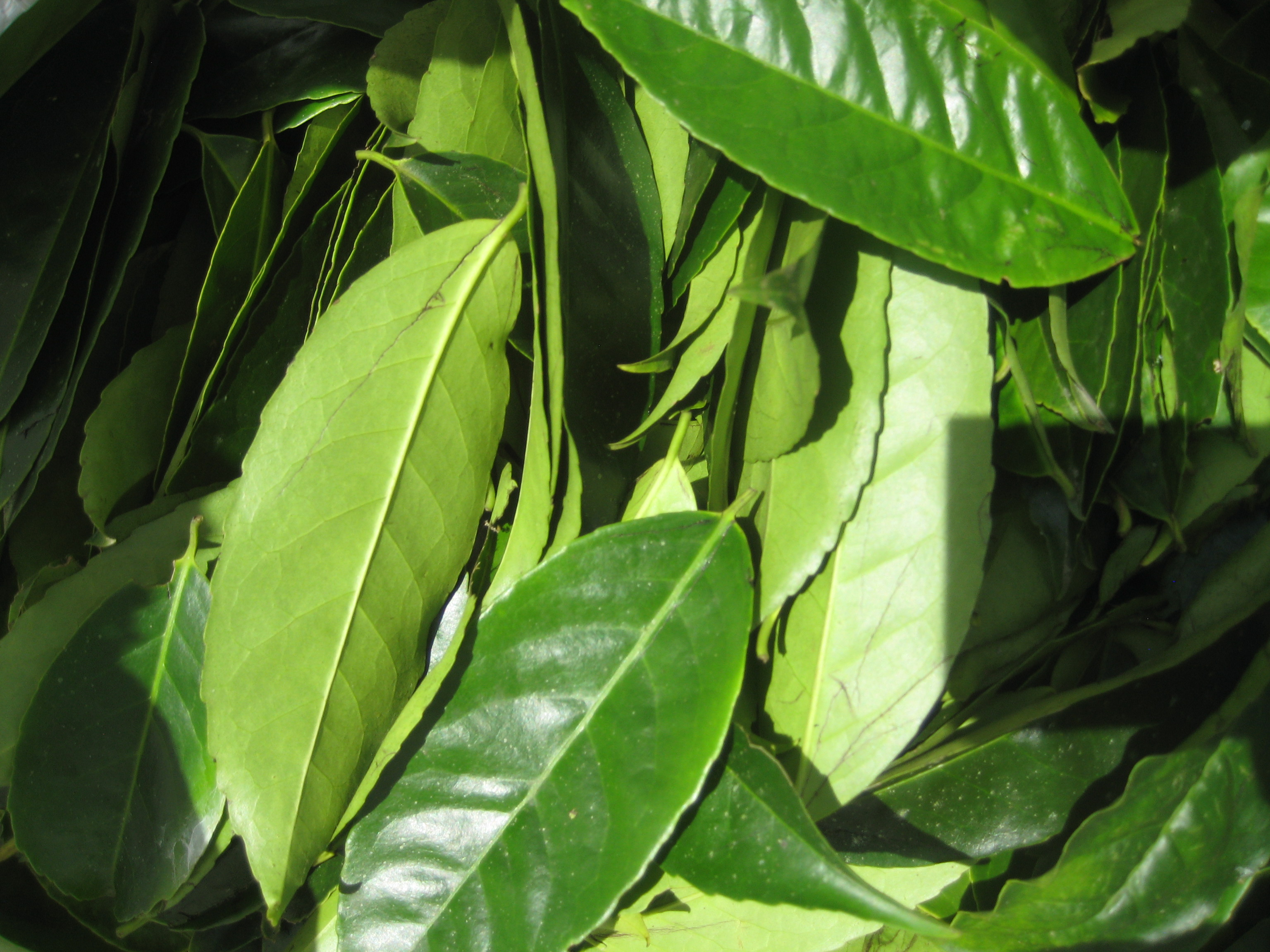
Wayusa leaves

Among the most important medicinal plants are:

Lustunda: A round fruit, used for eating or bathing. It is used to treat cancer or tuberculosis. The bark can be cooked and drunk.

Actu Chiri Guayusa: A plant whose vaporisation serves to calm pain in the body and give energy. It also cures the flu, pains and fever and is used to give massages.

Guayusa: This plant in the Quijos language is known as 'Waisa'. It is a natural energiser and is considered a sacred plant that chases snakes away. In ancient times, the benefits of this plant remained a legacy.

Wanto: A medicinal plant that helps to reduce swelling and muscle pain.

Pineapple: A fruit plant that serves for stomach pain and helps to eliminate the bacteria inside the organism.

Dunduma: A plant whose root is chewed and relieves stomach pain.

Papaya: A medicinal plant applied in the placenta of cattle as a massage and helps to eliminate the bacteria inside the organism.

Kiviyuyo: Helps injuries and lowers swelling when crushed.

Ayahuasca: It is a famous medicinal plant, whose purpose is to allow visions towards the future.

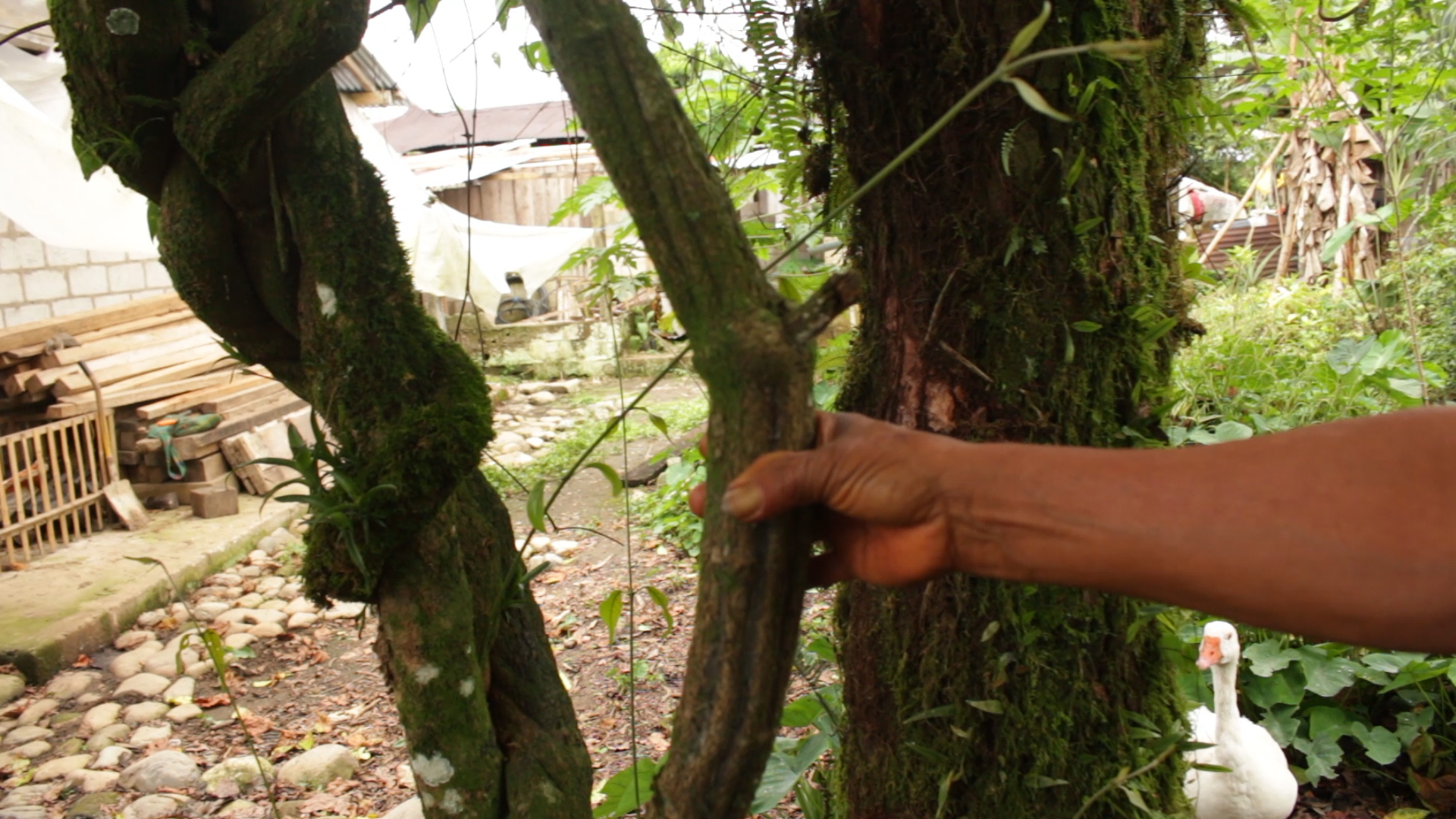
The ayahuasca plant, used by the Quijos.

Chalipanga: Component of ayahuasca that allows clarity in visions.

Manduro: Treats burns and prevents scars.

Ajiringri: Used as a pepper inside the kitchen. It is also used as a wound disinfectant and its root when crushed is used for stomach pain.

Yuquillas: Its root is used to relieve the (itching) sting of spiders, vipers and other insects. It is also used for cancer, diabetes, cataracts and is used in painting.

Ajopanda: It is used to bathe the children and prevent them from the flu.

Chonta: It is eaten and also used as a butter to avoid hair loss.

Aloe: Used for healing and to reduce swelling. It is also applied to wounds.

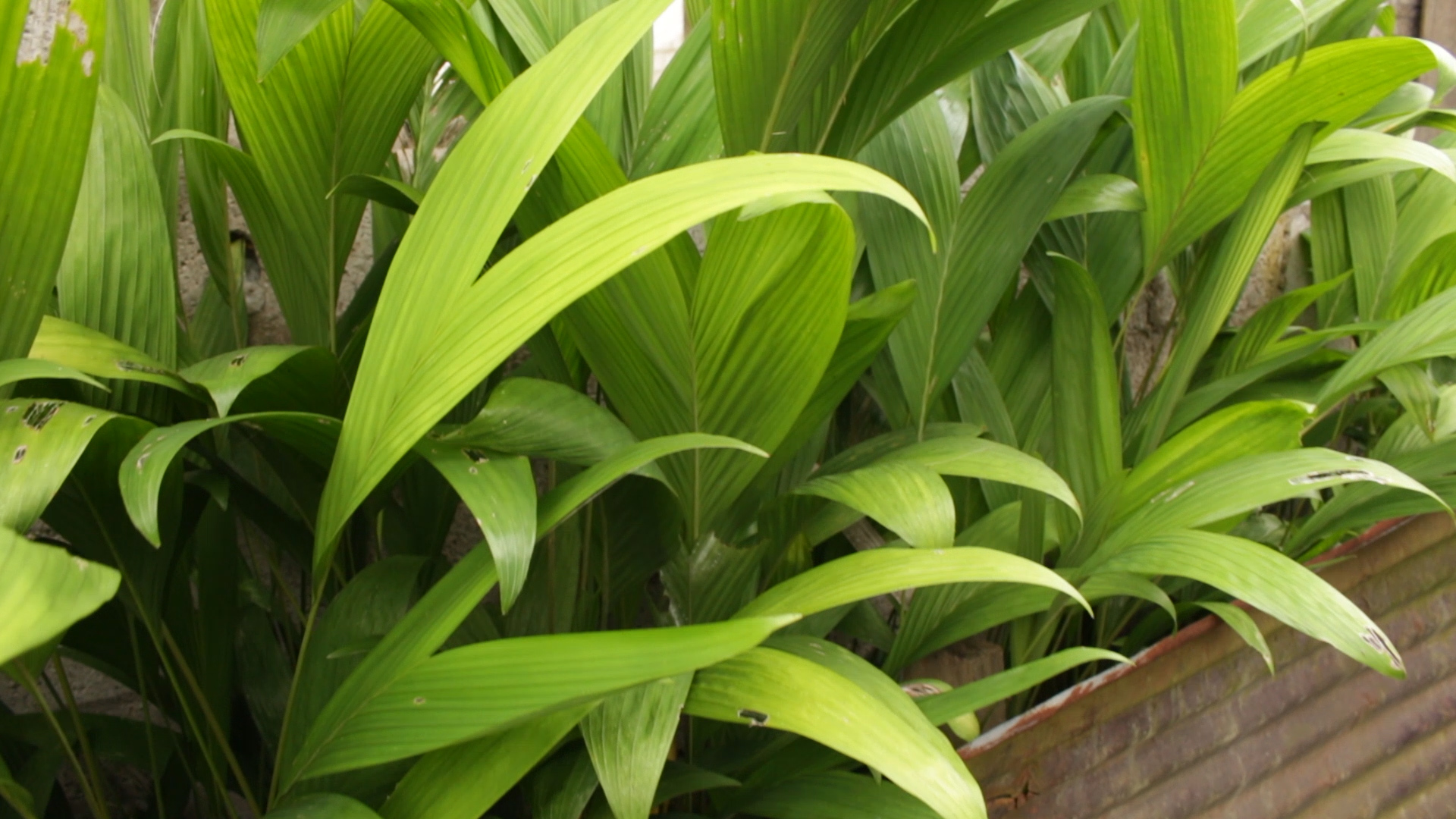
The leaves of chonta are used for the rituals of the Wankiris Quijos.

Verbena and Python: Used to cure yellow fever and malaria since the arrival of the Spanish.

== Traditional food ==
Traditionally in these communities, the women went out to work in the chacras and the men went to hunt and fish. Their days would start by drinking chicha or guayusa. Both of these are plants that are dried and brewed as tea. Traditional cuisine from these communities (Quijos- Quichua) do not use salt. They replace salt with ash from certain plants. Some food products in their diet include: sweet potato, plantain (and/or banana), yuca, corn (maize), rice, beans, chonta, heart of palm, chili, honey, meat and fish. They also cultivated granadillas, chirimoya, logmas, barbasco, ayahuasca and tobacco.

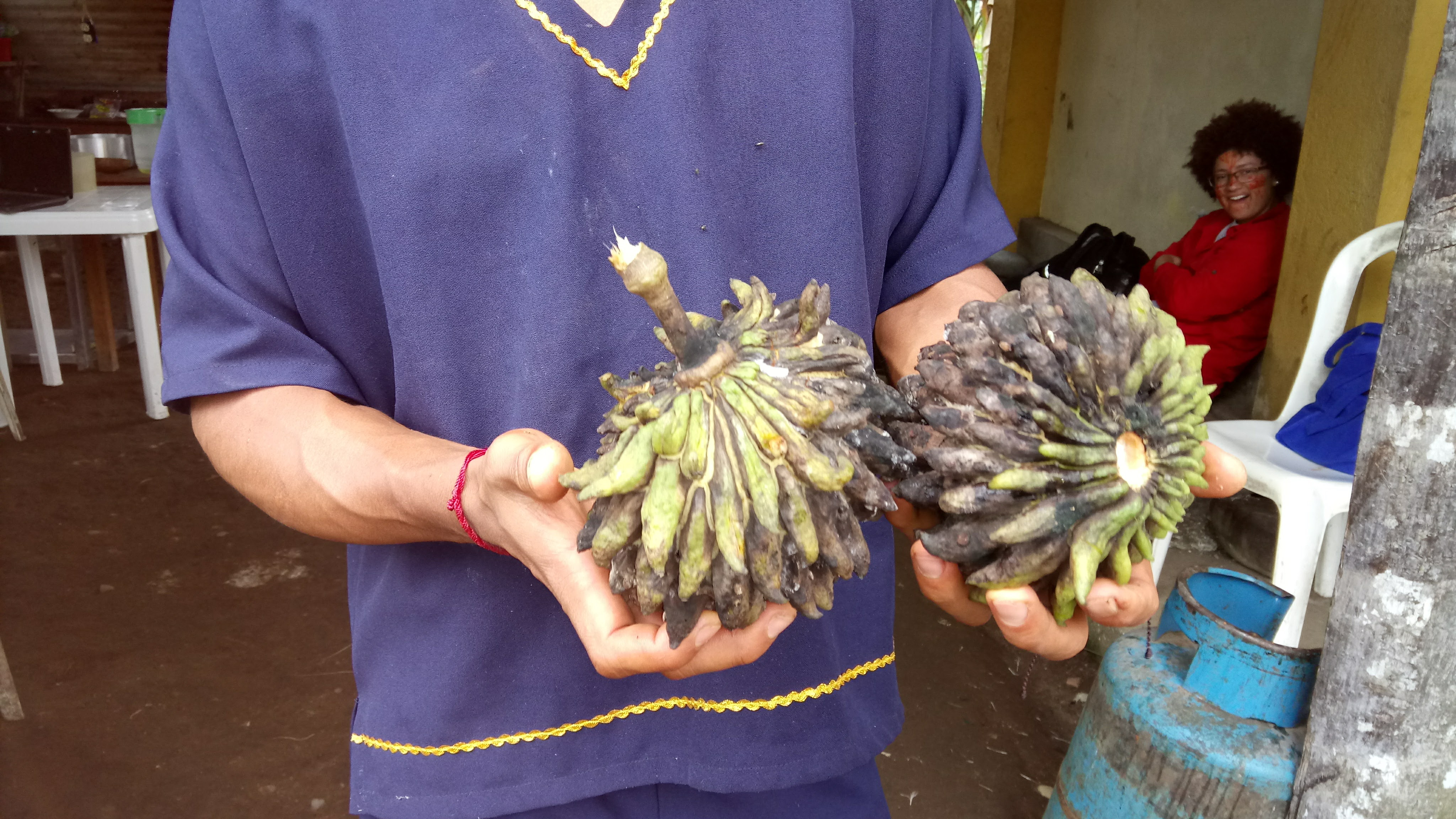
Chirimoya - a fruit cultivated by the Quijos in the Amazon.

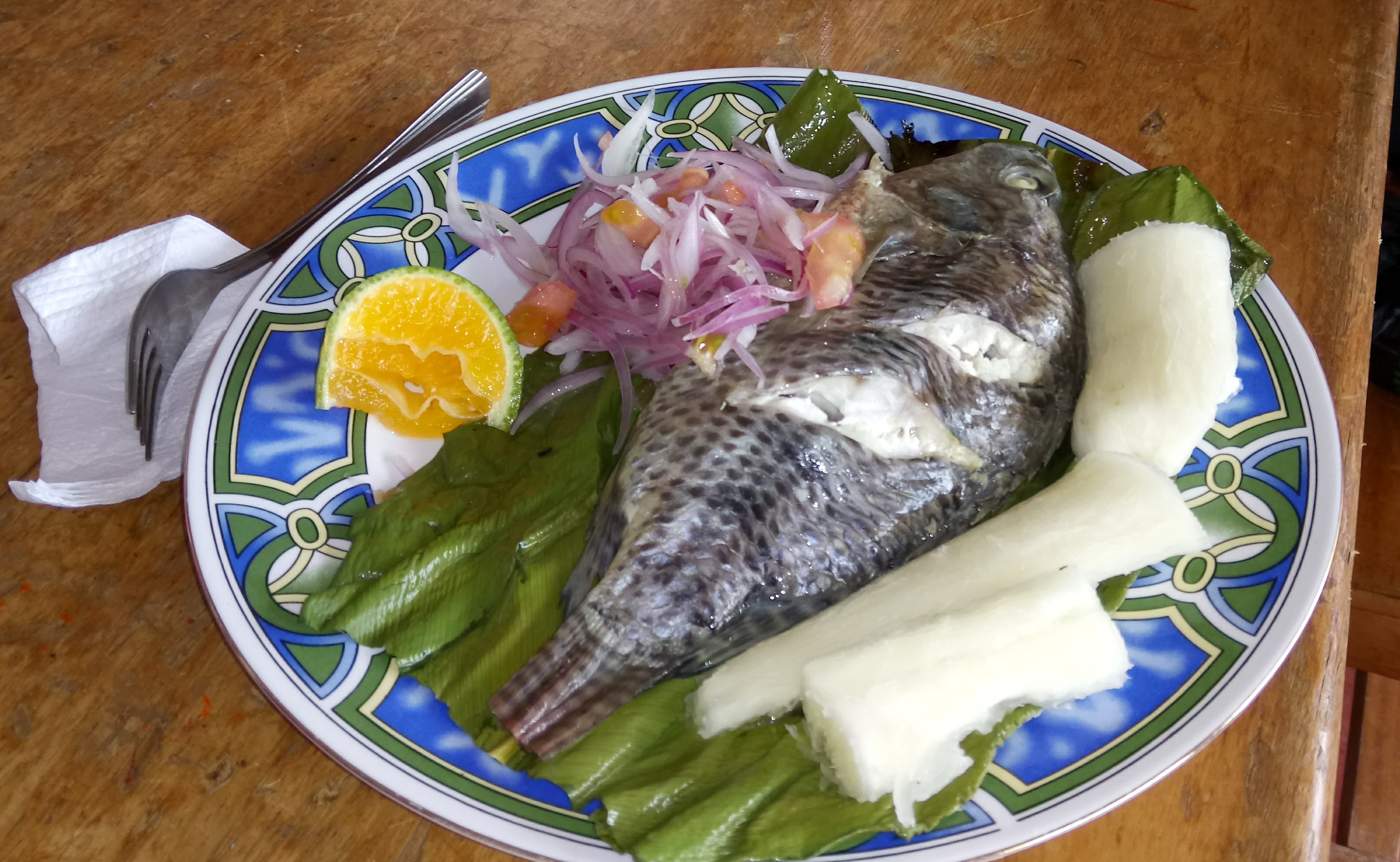
Tilapia Maito - a traditional Quijos meal.

=== Chacra ===
The above produce is grown and cultivated in these gardens (chacra). Household gardens, or chacra, remain important in the lowland Quijos (Quichua) communities in the Ecuadorian Amazon. Chacra production is not only central to household food security but also its symbolic importance to Quijos (Quichua) cultural identity.

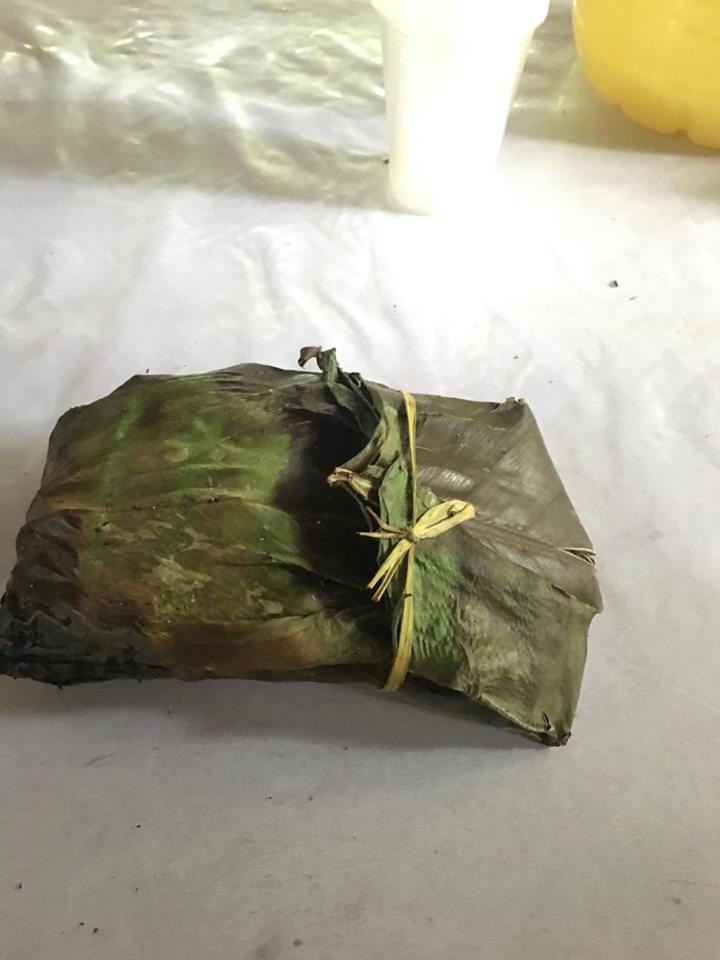
Often in traditional Quijos cuisine, food is wrapped in banana leaves and cooked over the fire.

=== Traditional cooking methods ===
Traditionally the Quijos (Quichua) communities cooked over an open fire. The use of banana leaves to wrap their food was also very common. The banana leaf wrapped food items would then be cooked over the fire in one of two ways; either smoked/grilled over the open fire or placed in a pot of boiling water to be steamed. The use of clay pots (olla) is not only an important aspect of traditional cooking but also of traditional art. Among their traditional dishes is the Yuyucallana, made with plants such as Yuyu (bud) scabbard, chontayuyu (chonta flower, yuyu (palmito) and banana leaf. Another favourite food of the Quijos is maito. This dish is cooked in the fire, it is fish (usually tilapia) wrapped in banana leaves. Finally, meals are served on the floor, on larger leaves of the banana tree.

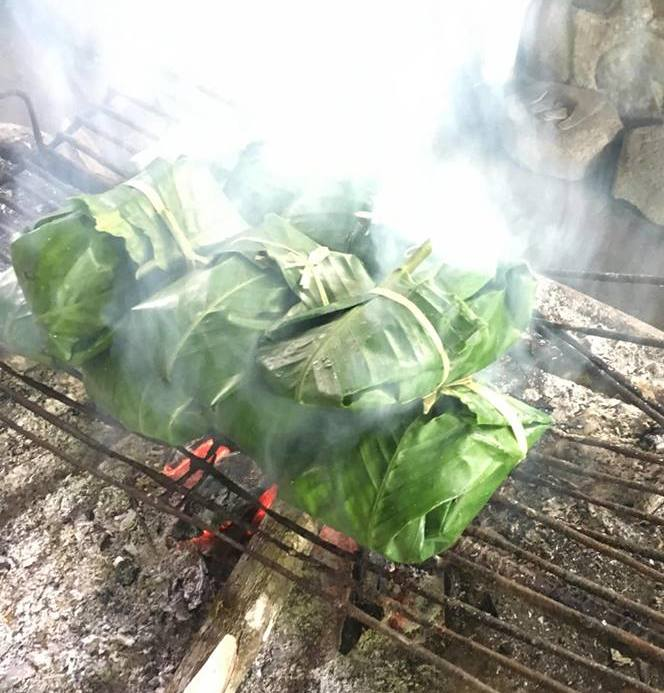
Maito (usually tilapia) is a traditional Quijos meal made by being wrapped in banana leaf and cooked over the fire.

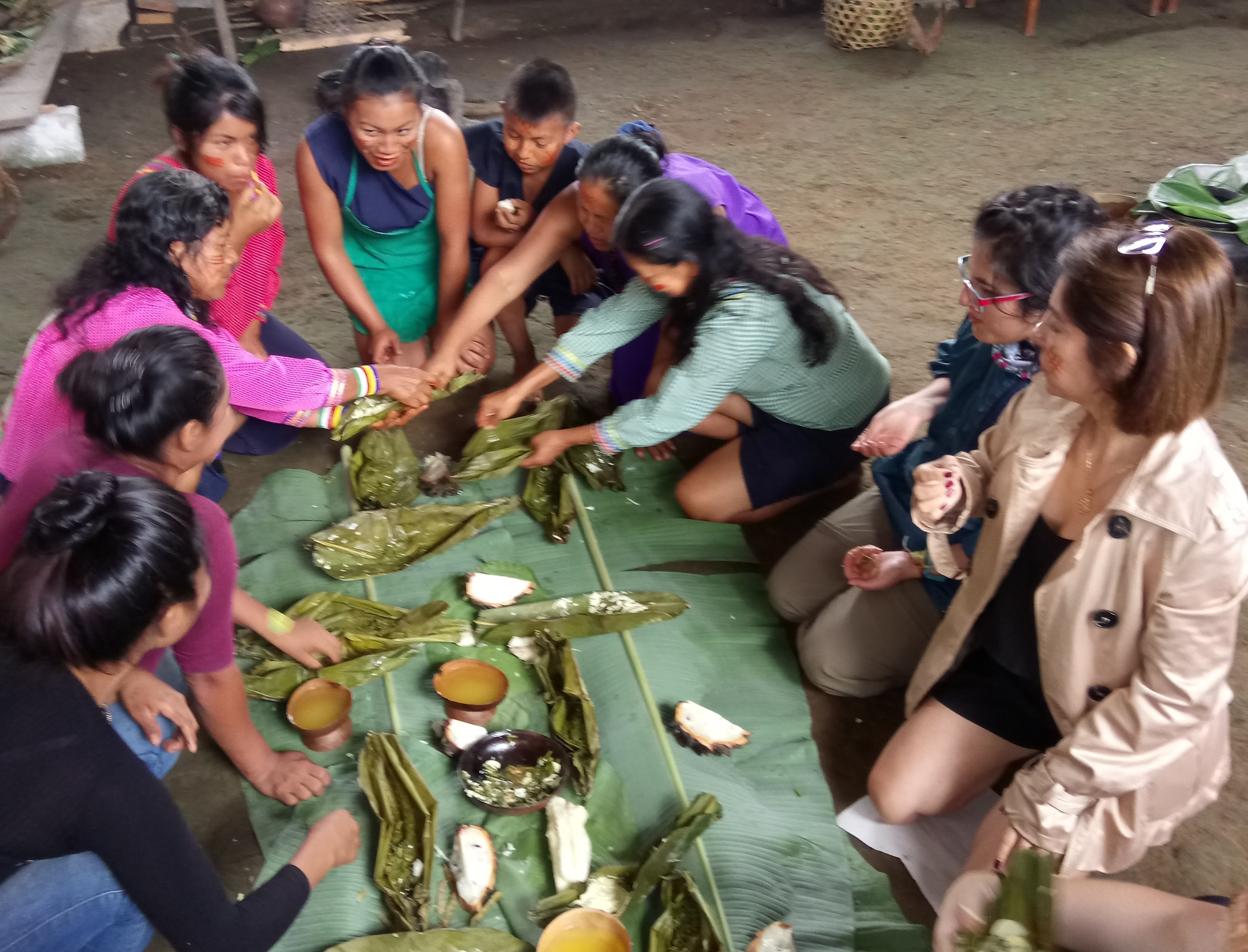
Meals are eaten on larger banana leaves on the ground.

== Hunting and fishing ==
Exclusively the men of the community carried out both hunting and fishing. Before going hunting they smoked tobacco as part of an ancestral practice. The ritual indicates that the Quijos would identify in the ashes of tobacco the animal they are going to hunt. In the case of not seeing any figure in the ashes would mean that they would not have good results for that day. Another traditional practice before the hunt was for the Quijos people to drink Guayusa. This plant, found in the Ecuadorian Amazon, contains caffeine and other components such as theobromine or L-teanine, stimulants that reduce physical and mental fatigue and fight stress. The leaves of the guayusa tree are dried and brewed like a tea. It is also a traditional tea that the Quijos brew in the early mornings. A traditional ritual they do before hunting is to smoke marijuana in order to see their prey clearly.

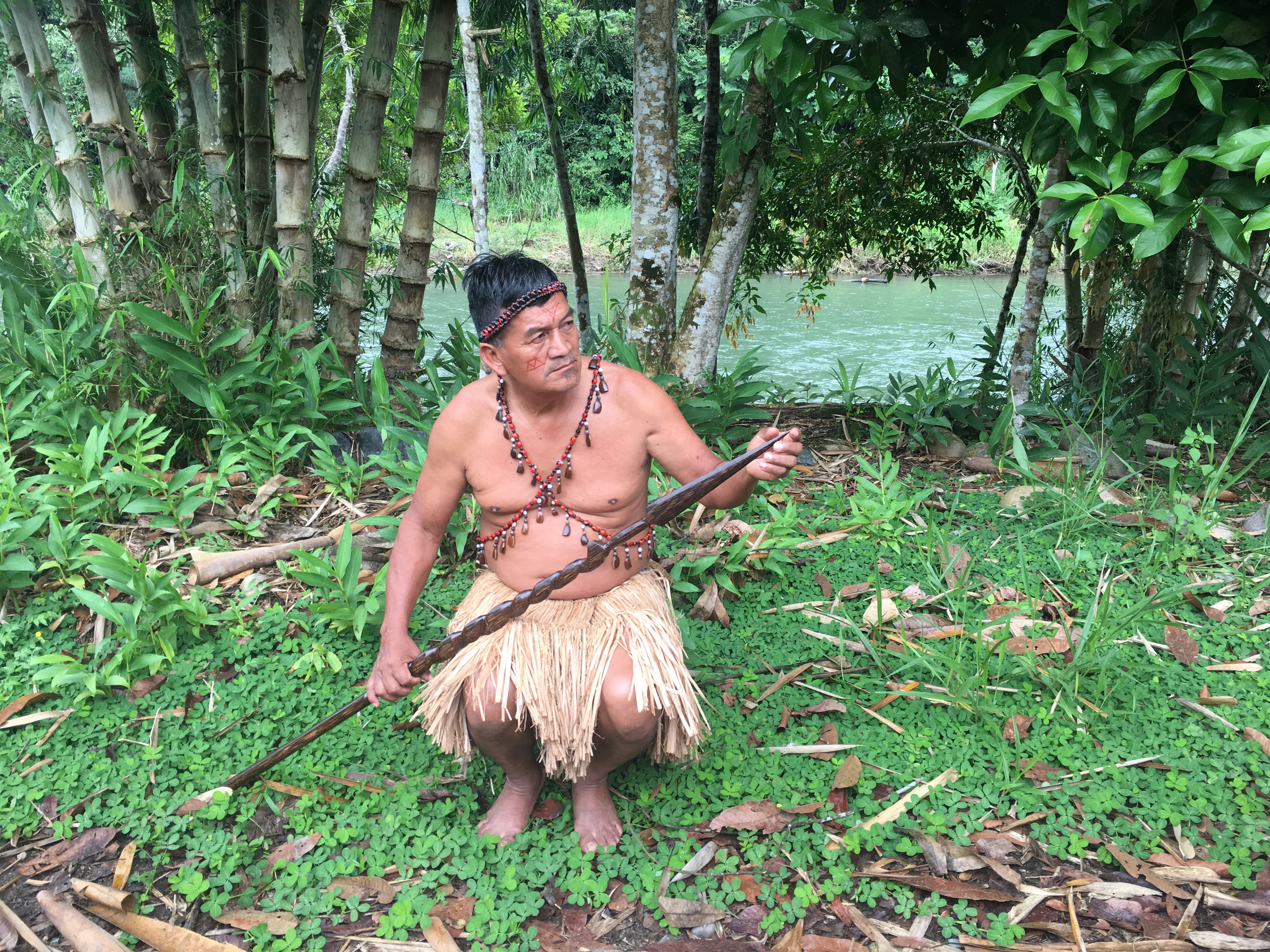
Quijos with one of his hunting instrument

Quijos capture dantas, monkeys, guantas, turkeys and other wild animals with an instrument made with wood called bodoquera. Bodoquera is a blowpipe and it contains small arrows with herbs and poison which will put the preys asleep instantly when they get in touch with the instrument. The poisoned arrow penetrates almost without the prey feeling it; the poison circulates rapidly and, half a minute later, the animal falls, completely dead.

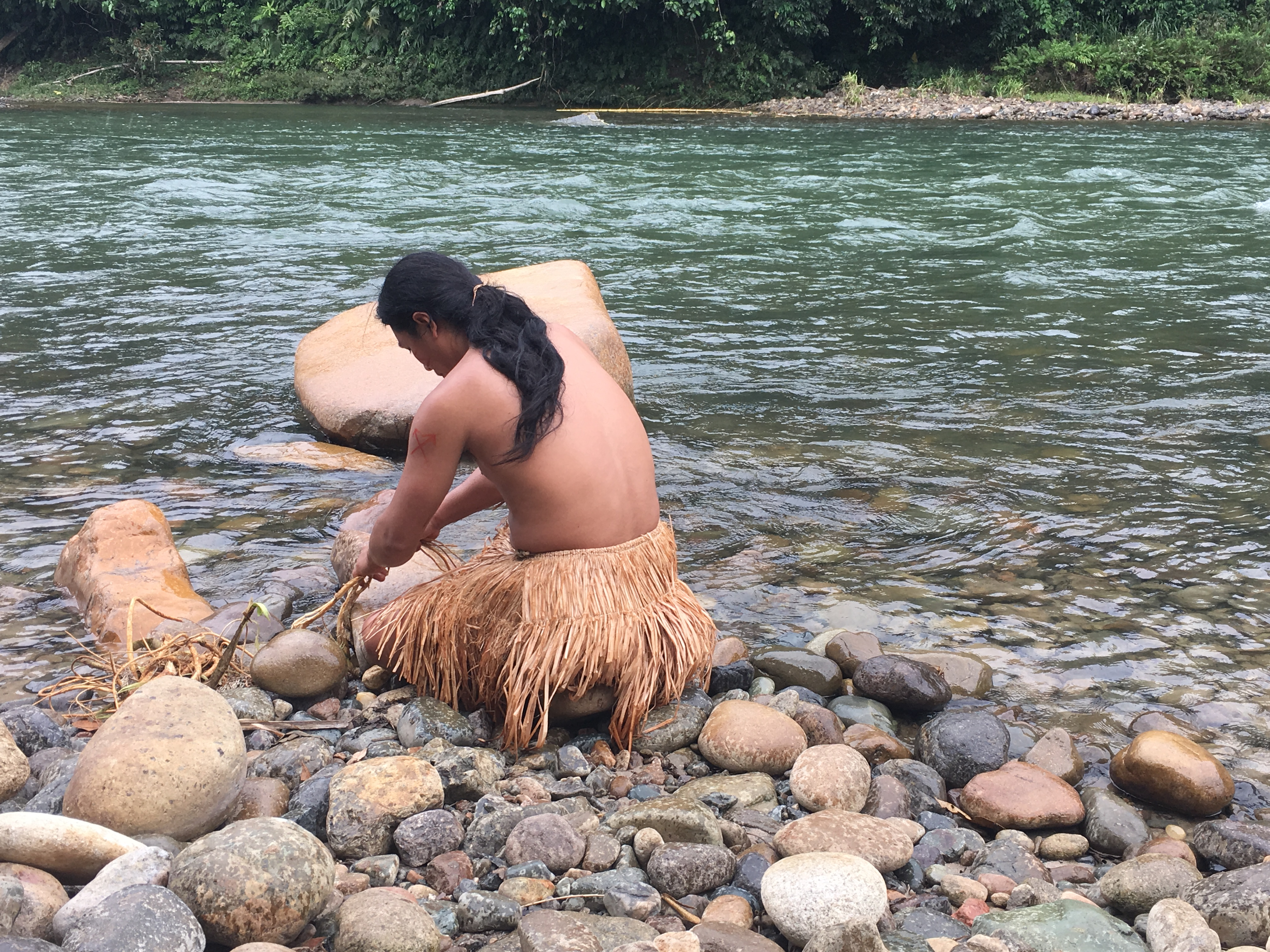
Quijos preparing Barbasco for fishing

Another way to catch the animals was through traps known as 'toclla', which hold the prey suspended in the air. They also capture birds with this trap (toclla). For fishing, they use traps and barbasco. Barbasco is a plant that contains poisonous chemical compounds that have been used for fishing by indigenous populations of the Americas.

== Crafts and other artisan works ==
Men and women wanted precious jewels on their chest, arms and nose. A typical ornament were dowels, objects that were embedded in the lower lips. In addition, they had gold ornaments on their nose. In Baeza and Archidona, gold earrings were worn on the chest and on the arms. The main ornament used by men at parties were necklaces that were worn across their shoulders and across their chest. Women, and girls, wore necklaces and bracelets made with crystal beads, both around the neck and around the waist.

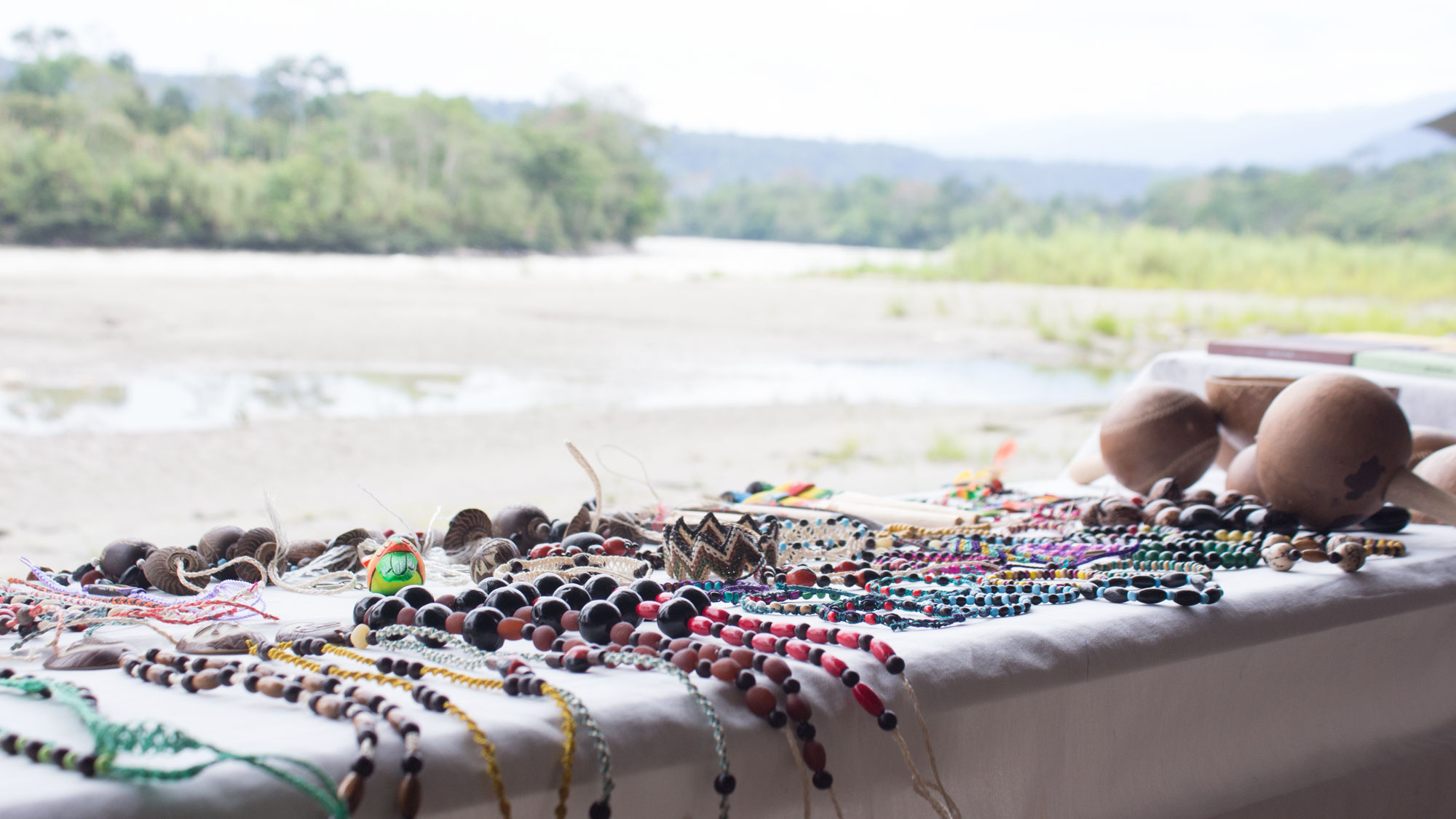
Handicrafts made by members of the Quijos Nation.

They made stone utensils, clay pots, hammocks, pita nets and wicker baskets. They also made objects using raw materials such as stone, metal, clay, wood and fiber. With the stone they made their work and war goods, they washed the gold in the rivers for their personal adornments.
