= Amazonian Kichwas =

Group of people indigenous to the Ecuadorian Amazon

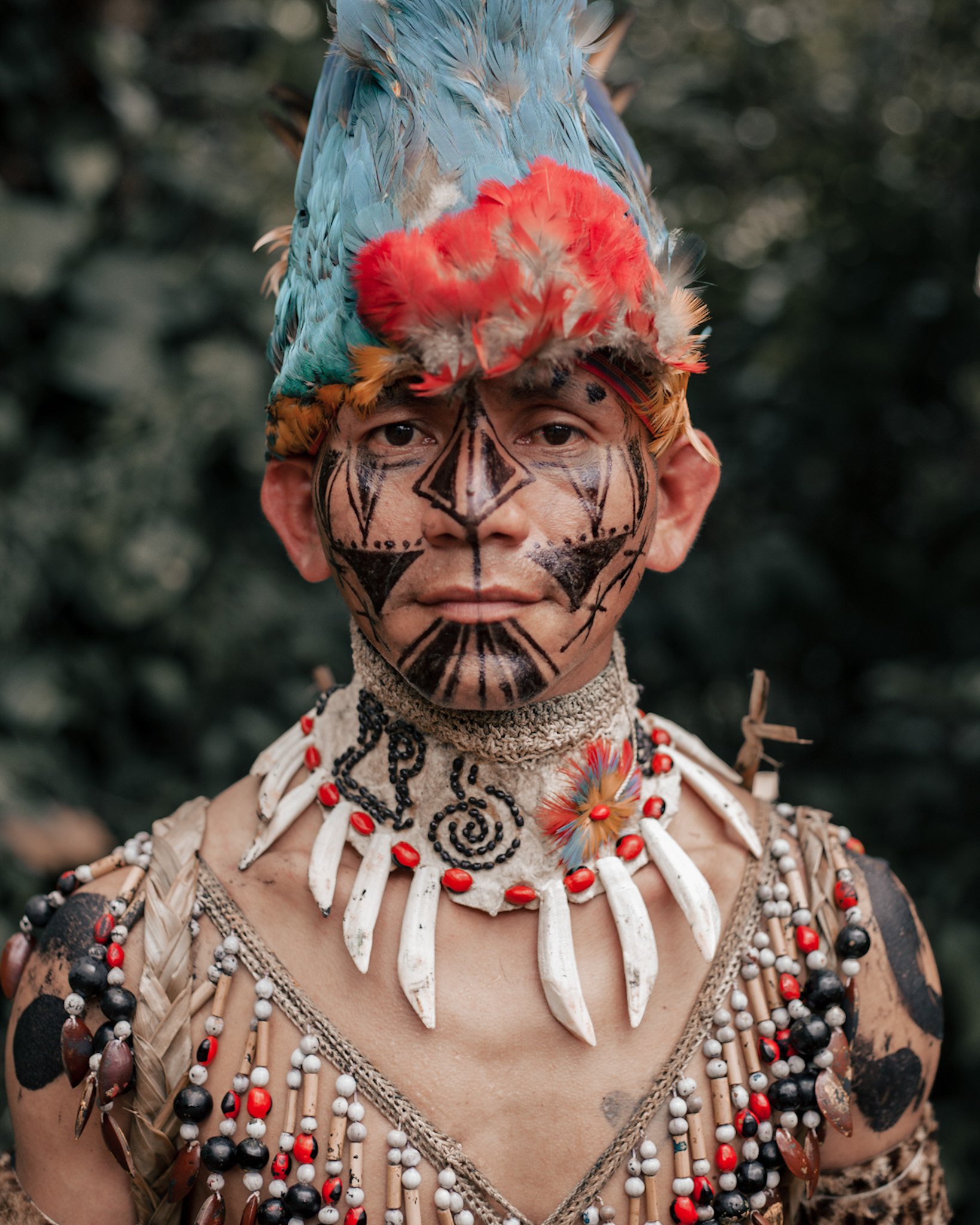
- Amazonian Kichwa man in traditional dress.

Amazonian Kichwas are a grouping of indigenous Kichwa peoples in the Ecuadorian Amazon, with minor groups across the borders of Colombia and Peru. Amazonian Kichwas consists of different ethnic peoples, including Napo Kichwa (or Napu Runa, as they call themselves, living in the Napo and Sucumbíos provinces, with some parts of their community living in Colombia and Peru) and Canelos Kichwa (also referred to as Kichwa del Pastaza, or Pastaza Runa living in the Pastaza Province). There are approximately 419 organized communities of the Amazonian Kichwas. The basic socio-political unit is the ayllu (made up by a group of families). The ayllus in turn constitute territorial clans, based on common ancestry. Unlike other subgroups, the Napo Kichwa maintain less ethnic duality of acculturated natives or Christians.

After a powerful protest of the Amazonian Kichwas held in Pastaza in 1992, the Ecuadorian state handed over the rights to 1,115,000 hectares (ha) of land for their use.

Related groups: The Inca people who established the Incan empire and colonized the Quijos. The Chanka people from Huancavelica and Ayacucho, Peru. The Inga people from Colombia, who speak a closely related Kichwa. The Huanca people from Junin, Peru. The Quijos people from the Eastern lowlands of Ecuador.

== Language ==
Amazonian Kichwa (Kichwa shimi, Runashimi; "runa" = people, "shimi" = language) is a group of Quechuan dialects including varieties in Ecuador, Colombia and Peru. The name "Kichwa" reflects the absence of phonetic mid-vowel allophones in Kichwa, due to its lack of uvular consonants, in contrast to other Quechuan languages.

Ethnologue estimated 408,000 speakers of Amazonian Kichwa in 2011. In Ecuador, Amazonian Kichwa is spoken by around 109,000 people from the 6 Amazonian provinces (Napo: 46,213; Orellana: 29,987; Pastaza: 17,211 people; Sucumbíos: 13,210 people; Zamora Chinchipe: 1,528; and Morona Santiago: 810).

According to the classification of Quechuan languages, Amazonian Kichwa dialects belong to the Northern Quechua group of Quechua II.

Major varieties of Amazonian Kichwa in Ecuador
ISO 639-3	Language names
[qvo]	Loreto–Nuevo Rocafuerte; Napo Lowland Quichua; Lower Napo Kichwa, Riverside Kichwa (de la ribera)
[quw]	Tena–Arajuno–Ahuano; Tena Lowland Quichua; Upper Napo Kichwa, Quijos Kichwa
[qvz]	Bobonaza–Puyo; Pastaza Lowland Quichua; Pastaza Kichwa, Canelos Kichwa

Most speakers of Amazonian Kichwa are now bilingual in Spanish. There are also some groups amongst the Amazonian Kichwa who speak Shuar or Wao Terero.

Among themselves, the Amazonian Kichwa differentiate from one another by using the names of towns or a regional part of a river in which their communities live, for example Napu Runa (Kichwa from Napo Province) or Pastaza Runa (Kichwas from Pastaza Province). For dialectal variation on the municipality level, subgroups of Kichwa include the Panos (Pano Runa), Tenas, Archidonas (Archiruna), Talags, and Shandias.

The earliest Kichwa manuscripts were written in the 17th century in an effort to produce a written form of the language. Hernando de Alcocer, a Jesuit priest, gave the first grammatical description of Kichwa in his book Breve Declaracion del Arte y Vocabulario de la Lengua del Ynga Conforme al Estilo de la Provincia de Quito (Short explanation of the grammar and vocabulary of the Inca language according to the style of the province of Quito). The prefecto, or religious regional governor's main mission was to evangelize the Kichwa living near the Amazon River. It is also known as a peripheral Quechuan dialect in contrast to the central Quechua spoken in Peru. [Spanish one]The use of Quechua as a lingua franca was the result of Spanish conquest that linked different groups of indigenous people from Peru, Bolivia, and Ecuador and classified the language as one. Linguists believe that Amazonian Kichwas did not derive from the "central" Quechua from the Peruvian Incas.

There are several features which are noted in Amazonian dialects such as ideophones. These words, often left out of traditional dictionaries, allow understanding of worldviews in context of Amazonian life. Ideophones are important parts of storytelling in a language and expressing runa views on animacy and the world around them. Ideophones, similar to other sound-symbolic linguistic features, give voices to animals within stories. Ideophones evoke sounds, smells, or other sensations.

== History ==
The original inhabitants, or ancestors of the Kichwa are believed to be the Quijos. They were found by the Incas in the 1400s and rivalries quickly started when the Incas demanded resources such as cinnamon, gold, and fur. By the 1500s most of Ecuador was part of the Inca empire. The Spanish conquered Quito, the modern capital of Ecuador in the sierra region in 1533 after the decline of the Incan army following the execution of Atahualpa. Shortly after the conquest, Francisco Pizarro sent his brother, Gonzalo Pizarro on several expeditions to explore land to the east Tahuantinsuyo. They were motivated by the Dorado and Canela myth, which was the belief that the east was rich in gold and cinnamon, an exotic spice for the Spaniards. After reaching Quito, Gonzalo Pizarro and many of his explorers fell ill and returned to the West. Francisco de Orellana, the second in command, continued toward the Napo River and discovered the Amazon River where the ancestors of the Kichwas lived.

== Culture ==
To the native people of the Ecuadorian rain forest, the idea of owning nature is not ideal and goes against their beliefs deeply rooted in their cultural and spiritual connection to Mother Earth. Runa have a strong connection with the forest and the animals that live among them. The native concept of what is means to be alive and have a soul is different than other related groups labeled under the umbrella term, Quechuan. The Napo Runa believe humans, plants, and animals all have souls and are almost regarded as equals. The souls of plants are of particular interest because the wellbeing of a community depends on a healthy relationship with nature. The soul of a plant is called an anima and each organism has its own unique anima. Unlike the Christian understanding of a soul, an anima is thought to be physical and visible through Ayahuasca rituals or dreams. Ayahuasca revered as a sacred or magical plant due to its medicine and spiritual purposes. It is the power to impart wisdom and instruct in healing. It is believed to be the mother of all medicine and mother of all plants. Other kinships such as a relationship similar to a grandmother figure is constructed by others. This is because the relationship to each is unique for every person and could be seen as a translator or communicator between two worlds. Other plants are used for medicinal and spiritual purposes and are treated by the communities with the same respect as they would give another human. The union between plants and humans also extend and is reflected upon the union of the person and their god-like figure. Rituals that include ayahuasca and guyama plants allow the people to form a strong communion between the humans, nature, and god which provides the resources surrounding them. During these rituals the participants are able to renew their relationship between their resources and it is more of a relationship than a dominion and exploitation. When they have a good relationship with the forest and its spirits, they believe that spirits bring wealth to the Amazonian Forest.

Their complex understanding of relationships is demonstrated through extensive wedding rituals set to unite the spouses and families from each side. "Becoming kin" and establishing an intense relationship between the two also includes the model for relationships with animals and plants of the spirit world. To become a reputable hunter or shaman, men contract marriage-like relationships with female spirits of the forest and the river. The spirit women of the forest are called sacha warmigura and the spirit of the river is called yaku warmigura. A stable relationship with the female spirits leads to favors given by the spirit's father or male relative who are protectors of the forest. There are many ways of entering the spirit world and this ability is not exclusive to men. The Napo runa are able to use mountains, whirlpools, caves, and large rocks as doors to enter the spirit world.

The spiritual experiences and understanding can be seen through everyday rituals such as storytelling or singing. Runa mythology stories include the former lives of plants, birds, animals, and inanimate objects as well as accounts of spirit protectors of the forest and river. Analyses of ritual songs to plants reveal that plant species evolved from a former human state. In the former state, plants are regarded as estranged lovers or children. There is an intrinsic fragile relationship between humans and plants because the cause of the estrangement is believed to be due to laziness or sexual looseness. Tending to plants is a spiritual action rather than a chore they are treated as children or lovers.

== Politics ==
After a powerful protest of the Amazonian Kichwas held in Pastaza in 1992, the Ecuadorian state handed over the rights to 1,115,000 ha of land for their use. In 2007, President Rafael Correa initiated a project to preserve the Amazonian rainforest. The Yasuni initiative for the ruling of oil companies to keep their reserves underground and take measures to reduce pollution of the Amazonian rainforest, especially indigenous communities at the bank of the river. The indigenous conception of spiritual life within the forest pushed for the Rights of Nature in the Ecuadorian constitution. In 2012 the president declared that oil extraction and exploitation was an economic priority and allowed foreign companies to enter ancestral Kichwa land, which is not legally titled as land belonging to the natives. At the time about 11.7% of Ecuadorian crude oil was extracted from the base where protests were held and the clash between government and native ecological efforts have negatively affected communities for over 40 years. In January 2015 Kichwa communities from the Corrientes and Tigre River basins in Amazonas protested Pluspetrol Company at the Jibarti base. They were successful at paralyzing the production of 14 oil wells which caused a loss about 3,100 barrels of petroleum per day. Another strike in which the Rio Tigre was blocked lasted 30 days and lead to 8 boats being blockaded on its way to the plant. The environmental evaluation done by the FECONAT(Comunidades Nativas del Alto Tigre), has categorized Pluspetrol's plants surrounding Kichwa communities as the source of contamination in the following: general water sources, drinking water, and soil. These sources were contaminated with petroleum, heavy metals, Coliforms, and hydrocarbons. The Environmental Health Department, Direccion General de Salud Ambiental found that 100% of water for human consumption was contaminated with iron, Aluminum, TPHs, NI, and Coliforms.

== Politics and spiritual beliefs ==
They believe that the forest has a soul called animas and that soul allows the vegetation to remain diverse and healthy. When deforestation happens, the forest loses part of its soul and it has bad consequences on the villages of that area. The souls of the tree are gone when the vegetation dies and the inhabitants of the land are not protected by the spirit of the forest. It is believed that deforestation and the recent increase in oil pollution is related to a higher incidence of diseases in the communities. To combat the negative spiritual outcomes of this modern problem, the communities replant trees and much of their daily life is dedicated to maintaining a healthy forest. Even with their strong desire to maintain a healthy relationship with the rainforest spirit, the lack of protections laws leads to arrested progress. In 2007, President Correa announced that he would protect the Amazon from loggers and oil companies. Those promises were never followed and the people remained helpless. Organizations have pushed for land titling since there is no way of inhibiting oil companies and loggers from taking over the land where the Kichwas live. Today, modern Runas seek to preserve their culture and Amazonian traditions through the energetic drink name from Guayusa. This plant has the same amount of caffeine as coffee, but is not as strong and preferred by Kichwa communities.
