= Martha Hildebrandt =

Peruvian politician and linguist (1925–2022)

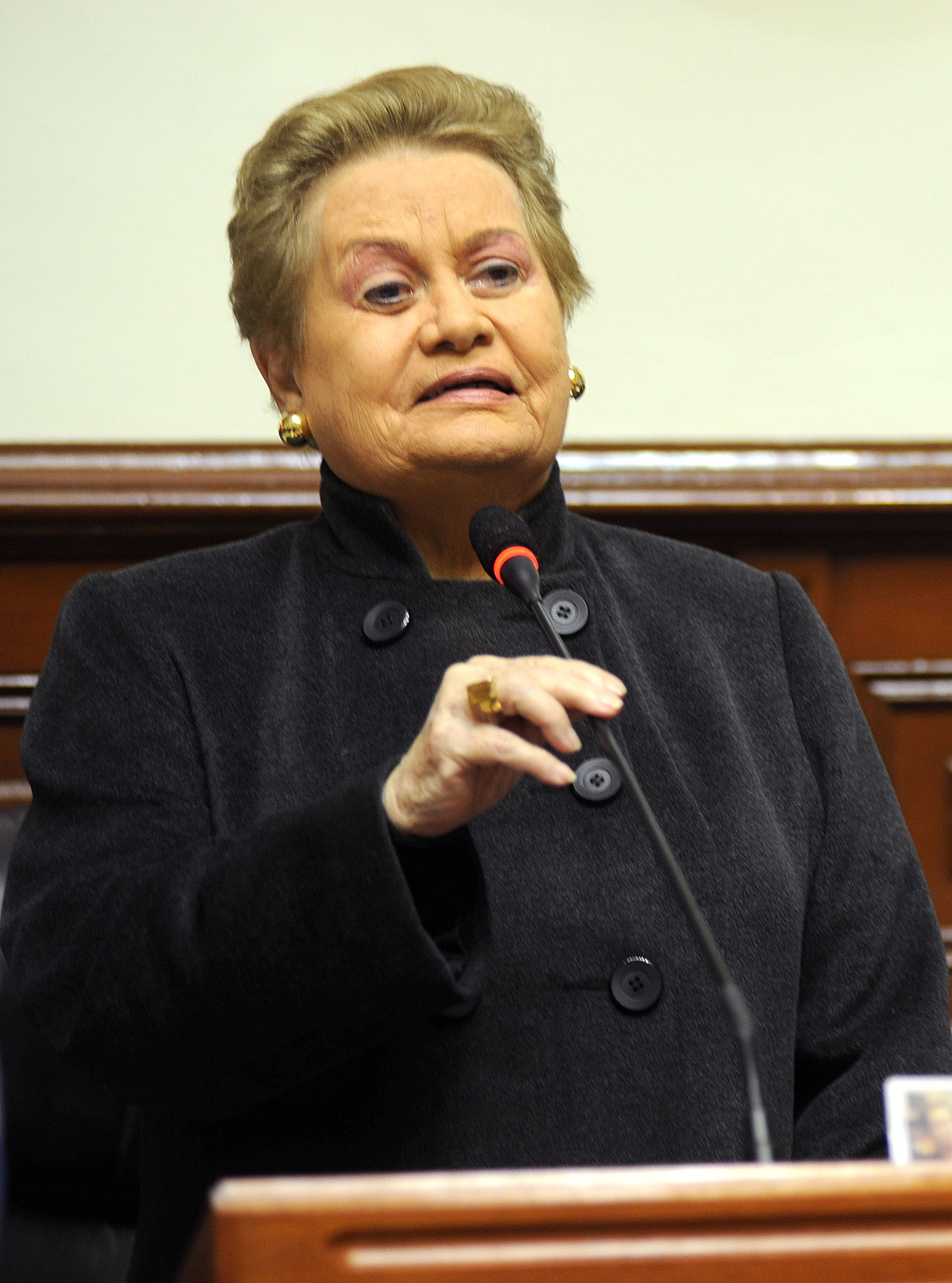
- Hildebrandt in 2010

President of Congress
- In office 27 July 1999 – 13 November 2000
- Vice President: 1st Vice President Luz Salgado; 2nd Vice President Marianella Monsalve; 3rd Vice President María Jesús Espinoza
- Preceded by: Víctor Joy Way
- Succeeded by: Luz Salgado

Member of Congress
- In office 18 August 2001 – 26 July 2011
- Constituency: Lima
- In office 26 July 1995 – 26 July 2001
- Constituency: Lima

Personal details
- Born: 13 January 1925 La Libertad, Peru
- Died: 8 December 2022 (aged 97) Miraflores District, Lima, Peru
- Party: New Majority

Martha Luz Hildebrandt Pérez-Treviño (Spanish pronunciation: [ˌmaɾ.ð̞a ˌlus il̪.d̪eˌβ̞ɾãn̪d̪ð̞ ˌpe.ɾes t̪ɾeˈβ̞i.ɲo]; 13 January 1925 – 8 December 2022) was a Peruvian linguist and Fujimorist politician. She was first elected to Congress in 1995 and, in 1999, she became the second woman to serve as President of the Congress of the Republic of Peru (following Martha Chávez's term in 1995–1996).

== Education ==
In 1942, Hildebrandt studied education and literature simultaneously at the National University of San Marcos. In 1952, she studied Structural Linguistics at Northwestern University in Illinois, United States, and subsequently Descriptive Linguistics at the University of Oklahoma, also in the United States.

== Career ==
From 1947 to 1953, Hildebrandt worked at the National University of San Marcos as a teacher. Then she traveled to Venezuela, where she worked in linguistics at the Department of Justice of Venezuela. In 1962, she returned to the National University of San Marcos as a professor and remained there until 1973. From 1972 until 1976, she was also the General Director of the National Institute of Culture.

=== Linguistics ===
From 1974 to 1978, she held important positions in the Organization of American States (OAS) and in UNESCO, in the area of linguistics.

== Political career ==
Martha Hildebrandt was a local linguist who was well known to the broad Peruvian public, though she spoke neither Quechua nor Aymara. She was the Perpetual Secretary of the Academia Peruana de la Lengua from 1993 to 2005. Her numerous books on subjects related to the Spanish Language are extensively quoted.

Hildebrandt's political life began in 1994 with her professional relationship with Alberto Fujimori. In the general elections of 1995, she was chosen by Cambio 90-Nueva Mayoría to run for Congress and won a seat in the legislature. When the general elections of 2000 approached and Alberto Fujimori sought re-election, she defended the controversial project, along with Martha Chávez, Luz Salgado and Carmen Lozada.

In 1999, she was chosen as President of Congress, and in 2000 she was reaffirmed in the position. When the regime of Alberto Fujimori began to collapse, Hildebrandt was removed from the position after holding the post for 48 hours only.

She was replaced by First Vice-president Luz Salgado, and then – after two disputed elections between government supporters and opposition – Valentín Paniagua Corazao (Accion Popular) was chosen temporarily as the new President of Congress and therefore became the Transitional President of the Republic after Fujimori's resignation.

In the general election of 2001, she was not elected; Luz Salgado was her replacement in the Congress of the Republic as Salgado was suspended from Congress. Already in the general election of 2006, advanced with the number 2 to the Congress and was chosen in the third voting inside Alianza para el Futuro, a coalition of Fujimorists and she was elected. In the 2011 general election, she lost her seat when she ran for re-election under the Fuerza 2011 party, marking the end of her political career.

In August 2006, Hildebrandt criticized two congresswomen from Cusco, Hilaria Supa and María Sumire, for being sworn in before Congress in their native language Quechua on 25 July 2006. Hildebrandt demanded Spanish should be used as the only language in Congress. The Congress, however, decided translations from Quechua and other indigenous languages should be taken into account for all sessions.

== Death ==
Hildebrandt died at her home in Miraflores on 8 December 2022, at the age of 97.

== Publications ==
- Wayúunaikṫ : Cartilla guajira, 1958
- Sistema fonemico del macoita, 1958
- La lengua de Bolívar, 1961
- Diccionario guajiro-español, 1963
- Peruanismos, 1965
- El habla culta, o, Lo que debiera serlo, 2000
- Léxico de Bolívar : el español de América en el siglo XIX, 2001
