= María Sumire =

Peruvian politician

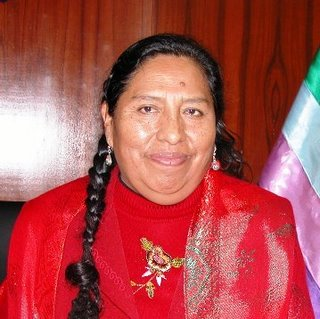

Congresswoman

Association of Andean Women

Personal details
- Born: Canchis Province

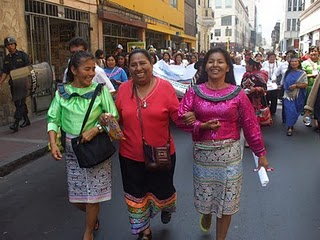
Sumire in an indigenous march in downtown Lima.

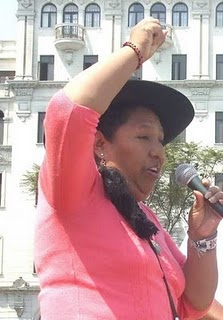
María Sumire in a meeting in front of Legislative Palace

María Cleofé Sumire de Conde (born in an indigenous community in Canchis Province, Cusco Region) is a Peruvian politician. She belongs to the Union for Peru party and was a Congresswoman representing Cusco for the period 2006-2011 and was a candidate for the 2005 Nobel Peace Prize.

== Biography ==
Sumire is the daughter of the founder of the Peasants' Federation of Cusco (Federación Departamental de Campesinos del Cusco), Eduardo Sumire, and was raised in the community of Collachapi (Layo district, Canas province, Cusco region). Her mother tongue is Quechua.

Sumire is an experienced lawyer from Cusco, who has provided legal advice for the Farmer Federation of Cusco in its struggle for land and women's organisations. She is a leader of the Association of Andean Women (AMA) and was one of the 1,000 women candidates for the 2005 Nobel Peace Prize. She said that she will seek to legislate in favour of the development of poor communities from the southern Andes and the decentralisation process in the country. Moreover, she will seek to monitor regional governments and to battle against corruption.

=== Congress ===
Sumire was elected to the Peruvian Congress in 2006, where she was the first Peruvian parliamentarian who was sworn in in Quechua, for which she was sharply criticised by Martha Hildebrandt and some other members of Congress.

María Sumire focuses on indigenous language and land rights of the poor communities in the Andes and indigenous people across Peru. After supporting protests of indigenous people against mining in the Amazon in 2009, she and several other congressmen were suspended for three months.

=== Recognition ===
Sumire was given the national personality award by the Cultural Ministry of Peru for all her work on support of the indigenous culture in Peru. The promulgation of law 29735 of native languages of Peru marked a new beginning for all the indigenous communities with respect to their own languages. Finally, indigenous communities will have the right to education, justice, transactions among others on their own language and culture.
