= 1992 =

1992 in various calendars
- Gregorian calendar: 1992; MCMXCII
- Ab urbe condita: 2745
- Armenian calendar: 1441; ԹՎ ՌՆԽԱ
- Assyrian calendar: 6742
- Baháʼí calendar: 148–149
- Balinese saka calendar: 1913–1914
- Bengali calendar: 1398–1399
- Berber calendar: 2942
- British Regnal year: 40 Eliz. 2 – 41 Eliz. 2
- Buddhist calendar: 2536
- Burmese calendar: 1354
- Byzantine calendar: 7500–7501
- Chinese calendar: 辛未年 (Metal Goat); 4689 or 4482 — to — 壬申年 (Water Monkey); 4690 or 4483
- Coptic calendar: 1708–1709
- Discordian calendar: 3158
- Ethiopian calendar: 1984–1985
- Hebrew calendar: 5752–5753
- Hindu calendars
- Vikram Samvat: 2048–2049
- Shaka Samvat: 1913–1914
- Kali Yuga: 5092–5093
- Holocene calendar: 11992
- Igbo calendar: 992–993
- Iranian calendar: 1370–1371
- Islamic calendar: 1412–1413
- Japanese calendar: Heisei 4 (平成４年)
- Javanese calendar: 1924–1925
- Juche calendar: 81
- Julian calendar: Gregorian minus 13 days
- Korean calendar: 4325
- Minguo calendar: ROC 81 民國81年
- Nanakshahi calendar: 524
- Thai solar calendar: 2535
- Tibetan calendar: ལྕགས་མོ་ལུག་ལོ་ (female Iron-Sheep); 2118 or 1737 or 965 — to — ཆུ་ཕོ་སྤྲེ་ལོ་ (male Water-Monkey); 2119 or 1738 or 966
- Unix time: 694224000 – 725846399

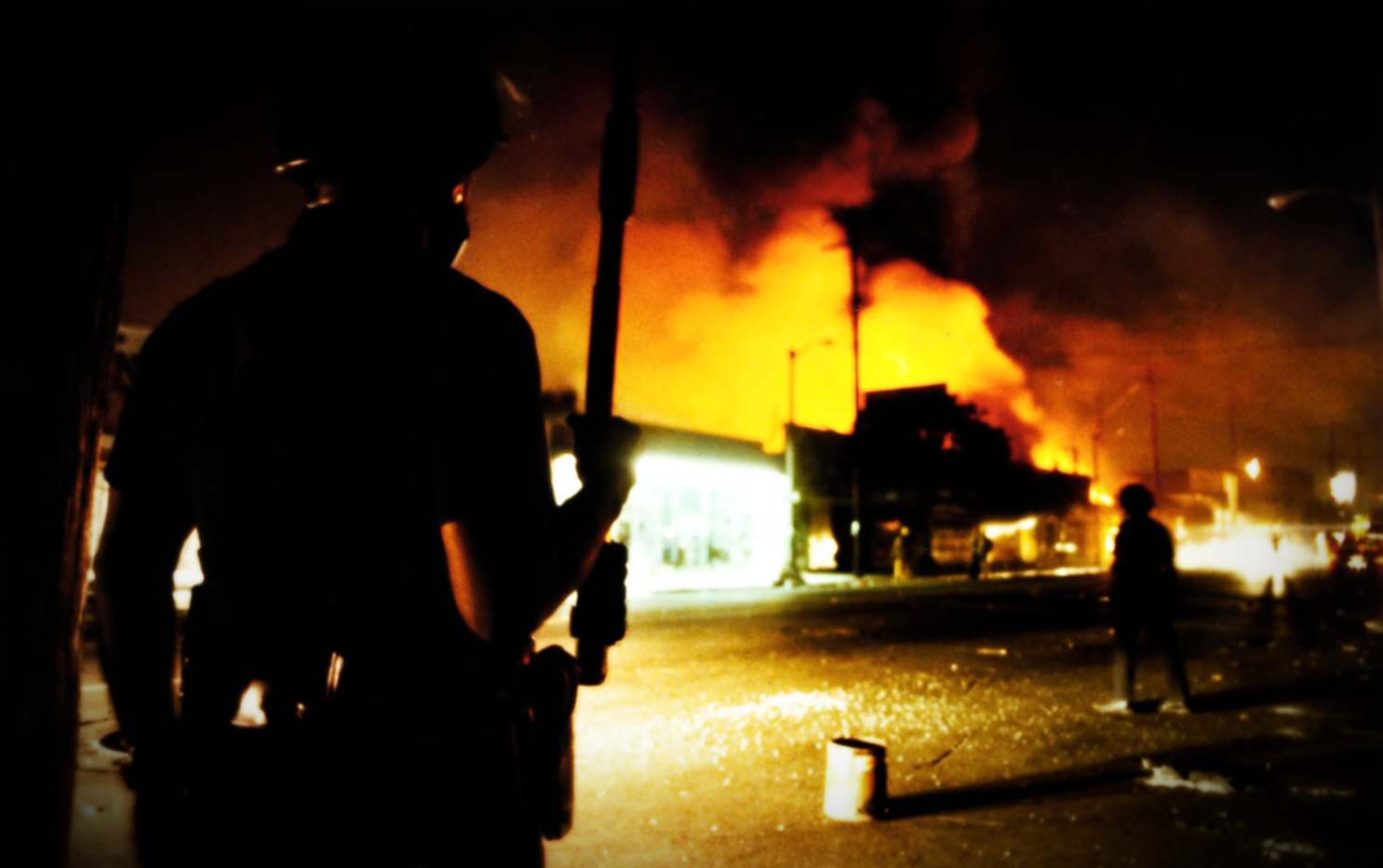
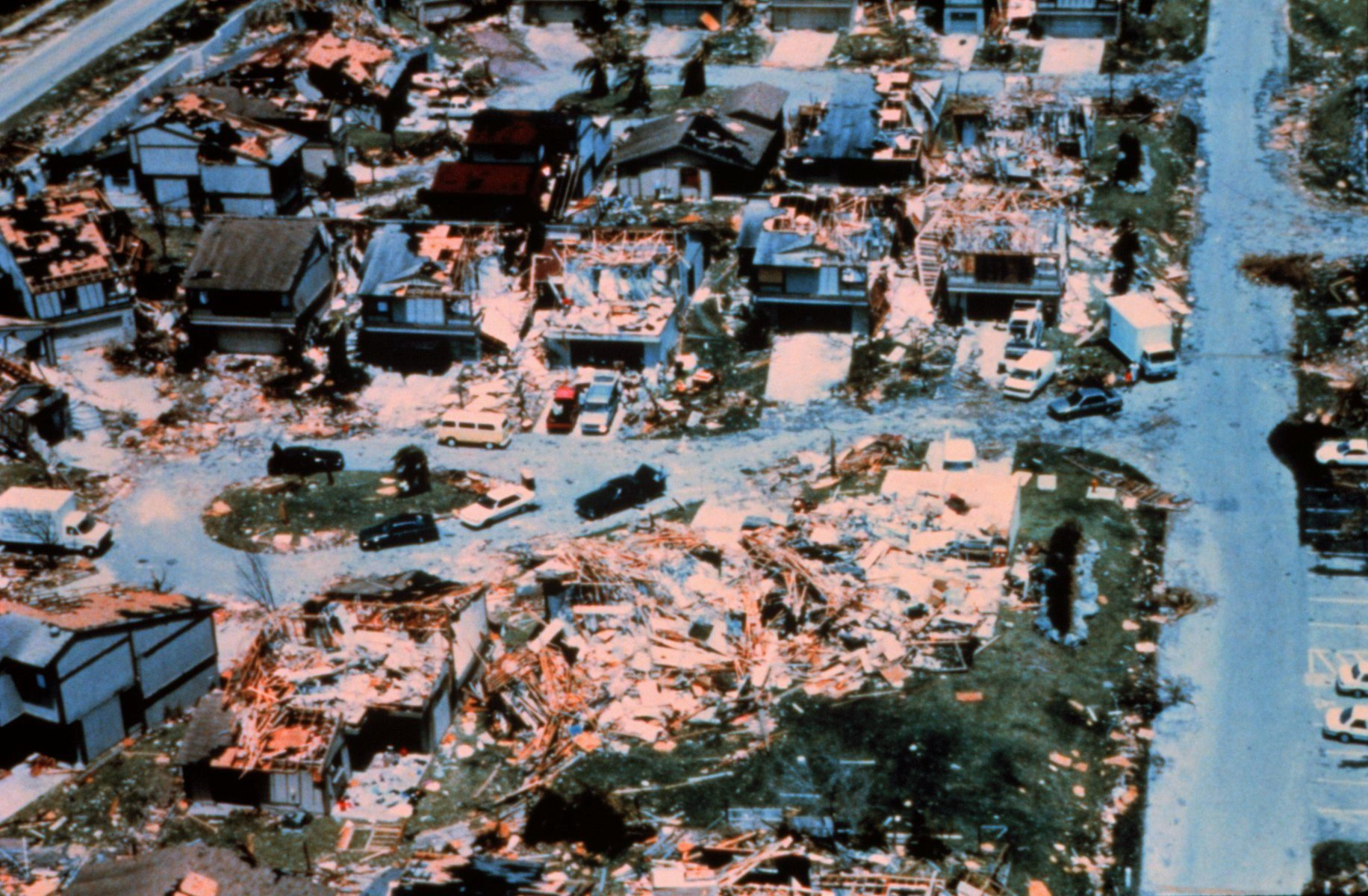
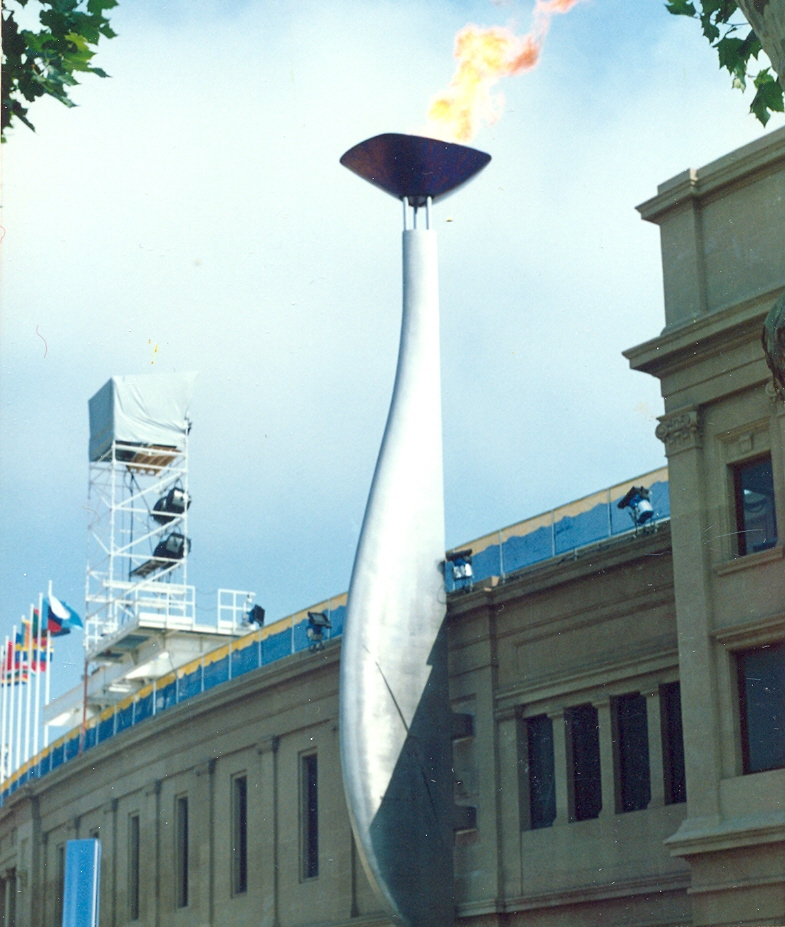
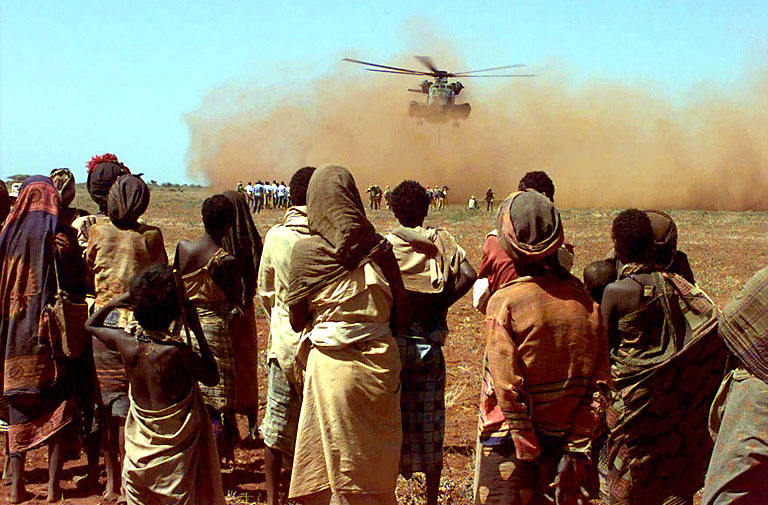
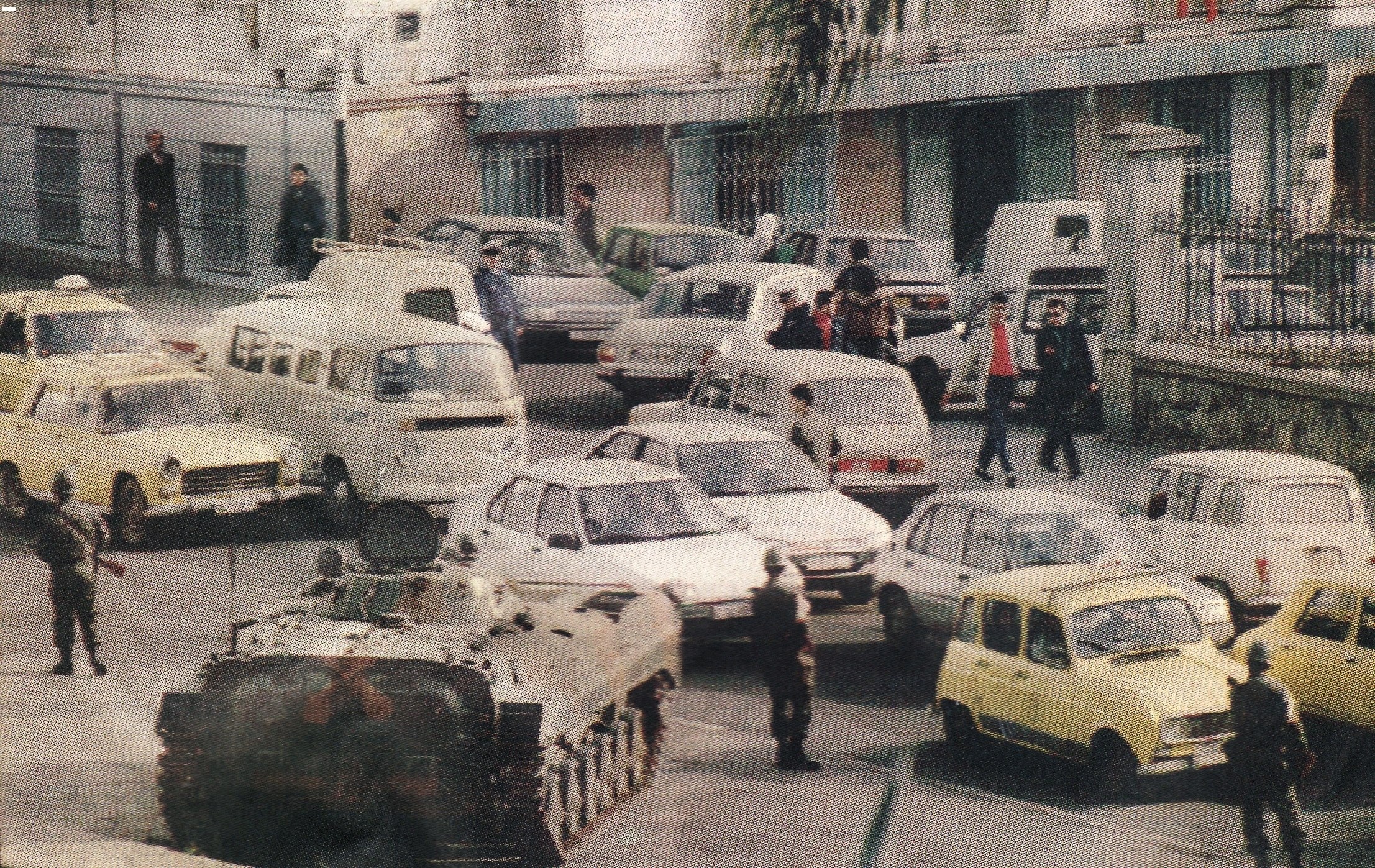
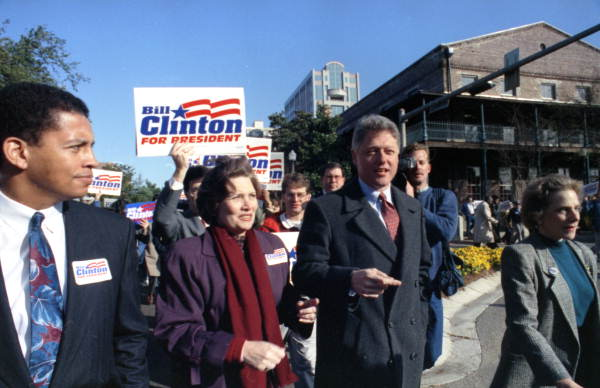
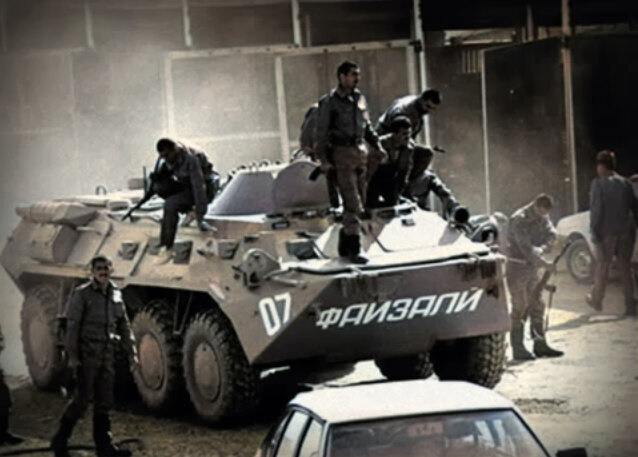
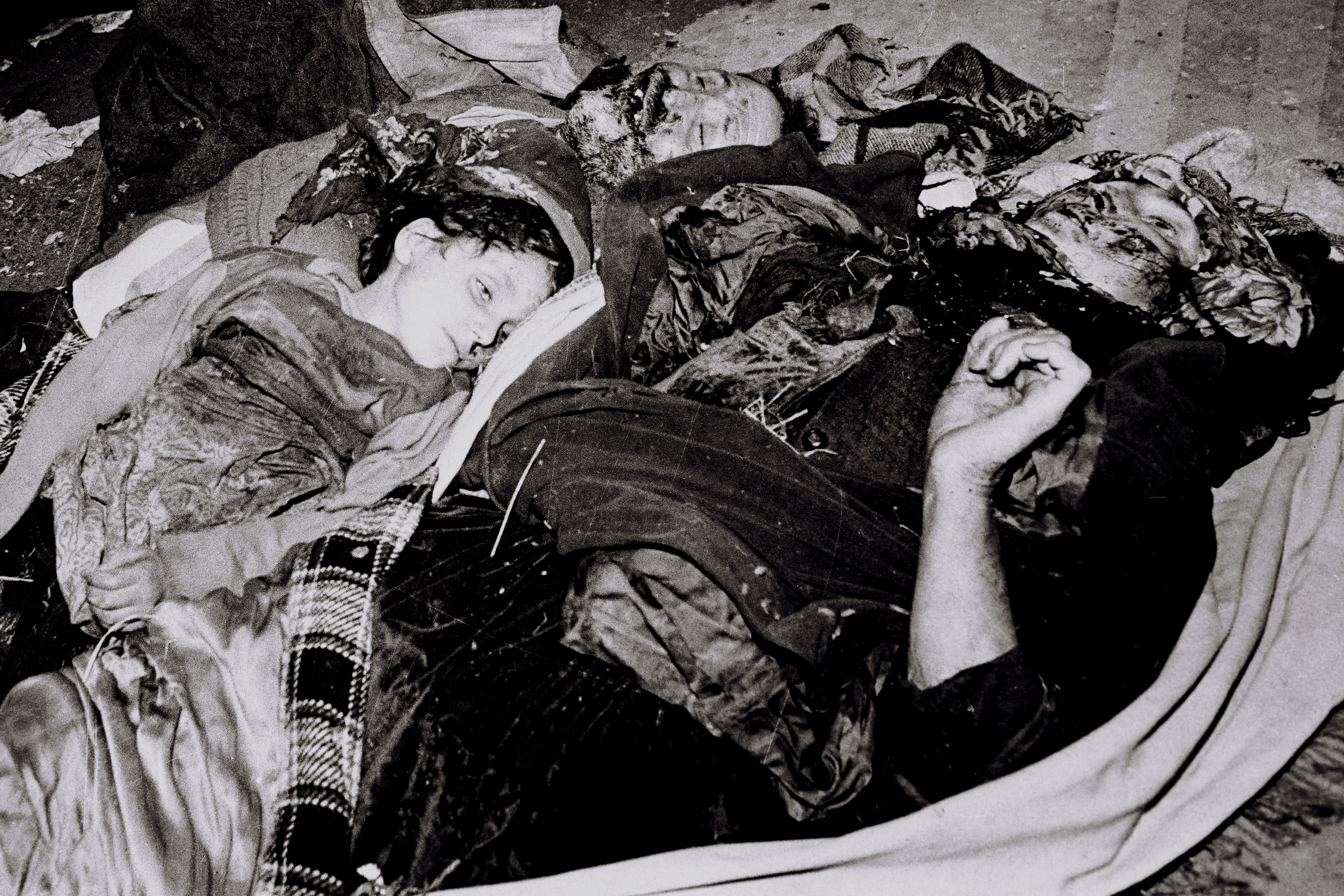
From top to bottom, left to right: the 1992 Los Angeles riots erupt after the Rodney King verdict, killing 63 people and causing widespread unrest; Hurricane Andrew devastates Florida and the Bahamas; the 1992 Summer Olympics are held in Barcelona; the Bosnian War begins as Yugoslavia breaks apart; the 1992 famine in Somalia causes mass starvation during the Somali Civil War; the Algerian Civil War begins after disputed elections; the 1992 United States presidential election brings Bill Clinton to power; the Tajikistani Civil War erupts following the collapse of the Soviet Union; and the Khojaly massacre occurs during the First Nagorno-Karabakh War.

1992 (MCMXCII) was a leap year starting on Wednesday of the Gregorian calendar, the 1992nd year of the Common Era (CE) and Anno Domini (AD) designations, the 992nd year of the 2nd millennium, the 92nd year of the 20th century, and the 3rd year of the 1990s decade.

1992 was designated as International Space Year by the United Nations.

== Events ==
=== January ===
- January 1 – Boutros Boutros-Ghali of Egypt replaces Javier Pérez de Cuéllar of Peru as United Nations Secretary-General.
- January 6
  - The Nagorno-Karabakh Republic is proclaimed by the Armenians of Nagorno-Karabakh.
  - 1991–92 Georgian coup d'état: President of Georgia Zviad Gamsakhurdia flees the country as a result of the military coup.
- January 7 – 1992 European Community Monitor Mission helicopter downing: A Yugoslav Air Force Mikoyan-Gurevich MiG-21 attacks two Italian Army Agusta-Bell AB-206L LongRanger helicopters carrying observers from the European Community Monitor Mission. One crashes, killing five people on board. The other helicopter crash-lands, but its occupants survive.
- January 9
  - Bosnian Serbs declare their own republic within Bosnia and Herzegovina, in protest at the decision by Bosniaks and Bosnian Croats to seek recognition by the European Communities.
  - First confirmed detection of exoplanets with announcement of the discovery of several terrestrial-mass planets orbiting the pulsar PSR B1257+12, by radio astronomers Aleksander Wolszczan and Dale Frail working in the United States.
- January 15 – The Socialist Federal Republic of Yugoslavia begins to break up; Slovenia and Croatia gain independence and international recognition in some Western countries.
- January 16 – El Salvador officials and rebel leaders sign the Chapultepec Peace Accords in Mexico City, ending the 12-year Salvadoran Civil War that claimed at least 75,000 lives.
- January 19
  - In the Bulgarian presidential election, the first held by direct vote, Zhelyu Zhelev, leader of the Union of Democratic Forces, retains office.
  - Paramount Leader of China Deng Xiaoping speaks in Shenzhen during his southern tour, a move that would return China on its right-wing march towards free market economics.
- January 20 – Air Inter Flight 148, an Airbus A320-111, crashes in the Vosges Mountains near Barr, France, while circling to land at Strasbourg, France, killing 87 of the 96 people on board. Facing tough competition from French high-speed TGV trains, Air Inter had encouraged its pilots to fly at high speeds at low altitudes, and had not installed ground proximity warning systems on its airliners because such systems generated too many nuisance alarms during high-speed, low-altitude flight.
- January 22 – Rebel forces occupy Zaire's national radio station in Kinshasa and broadcast a demand for the government's resignation.
- January 24 – China and Israel establish diplomatic relations.
- January 26
  - Boris Yeltsin announces that Russia will stop targeting cities of the United States and its allies with nuclear weapons. In return President George H. W. Bush announces that the United States and its allies will stop targeting Russia and the remaining communist states with nuclear weapons.
  - In Mauritania, security forces open fire on violent extremist opponents of President of Mauritania Maaouya Ould Sid'Ahmed Taya, allegedly killing at least four people.
- January 27 – First Nagorno-Karabakh War: in the disputed territory of Nagorno-Karabakh, fighting between Armenians and Azeris leaves at least 60 people dead.
- January 30 – North Korea signs an accord with the International Atomic Energy Agency allowing for international inspections of North Korea's nuclear power plants.

=== February ===
- February 1 – President of the United States George Bush meets with President of Russia Boris Yeltsin at Camp David, where they formally declare that the Cold War is over.
- February 3 – South African State President F.W. de Klerk and Nelson Mandela, African National Congress leader, are jointly awarded the Felix Houphouet-Boigny Peace Prize at the UNESCO headquarters in Paris.
- February 4 – In Venezuela, Hugo Chávez leads an unsuccessful coup attempt against President of Venezuela Carlos Andrés Pérez.
- February 6 – The Ruby Jubilee of Elizabeth II commemorates 40 years since the accession of Elizabeth II as Queen of the United Kingdom and other Commonwealth realms.
- February 7 – The Maastricht Treaty is signed, founding the European Union.
- February 8 – The opening ceremony for the 1992 Winter Olympics is held in Albertville, France.
- February 9 – Algerian Civil War: The government of Algeria declares a state of emergency and begins a crackdown on the Islamic Salvation Front.
- February 14 – Ukraine and four other nations in the Commonwealth of Independent States reject Russia's proposal to maintain unified armed forces. Ukraine, Moldova and Azerbaijan announce they will go ahead with plans to create their own military forces.
- February 16 – In Lebanon, Israeli helicopter gunships assassinate Abbas al-Musawi, the leader of Hezbollah, and his son, in retaliation for a February 14 raid that killed three Israeli soldiers.
- February 18 – Iraq disarmament crisis: The Executive Chairman of UNSCOM details Iraq's refusal to abide by UN Security Council disarmament resolutions.
- February 21 – The United Nations Security Council approves Resolution 743 to send a UNPROFOR peacekeeping force to Yugoslavia.
- February 25–26 – 613 Azerbaijani civilians are massacred in Khojaly.
- February 26 – The Supreme Court of Ireland rules that a 14-year-old rape victim may travel to the United Kingdom to have an abortion.
- February 28 – Ownership of the port town of Walvis Bay is transferred from South Africa to Namibia.

=== March ===
- March 1 – The first victims of the Bosnian War are a Serb bridegroom's father and an Orthodox priest in a Sarajevo shooting. In the Bosnian independence referendum, held from February 29 to March 1 and boycotted by Bosnian Serbs, the majority of the Bosniak and Bosnian Croat communities have voted for Bosnia-Herzegovina's independence.
- March 2 – In Dubăsari, Moldova, escalating tensions turn into open hostilities and the beginning of the Transnistria War.
- March 4 – The Supreme Court of Algeria bans the Islamic Salvation Front, which is poised to win control of the Parliament of Algeria in runoff elections.
- March 12 – Mauritius becomes a republic while remaining a member of the Commonwealth of Nations.
- March 13 – The 6.7 M_{w} Erzincan earthquake affects eastern Turkey with a maximum Mercalli intensity of VIII (Severe), killing 498–652 and injuring around 2,000.
- March 18 – White South Africans vote in favour of political reforms which will end the apartheid regime and create a power-sharing multi-racial government.
- March 22
  - In French regional elections, the conservative Rally for the Republic and the centre-right Union for French Democracy win in a landslide, capturing 20 of 22 metropolitan regional presidencies.
  - STS-45: Space Shuttle Atlantis takes off from Cape Canaveral carrying instruments designed to study global warming.
- March 24 – The Treaty on Open Skies is signed in Helsinki, Finland, to establish a program of unarmed surveillance flights over the 34 member states. It went into effect on January 1, 2002.
- March 25 – The International Atomic Energy Agency orders Iraq to destroy an industrial complex at Al Atheer that is being used to manufacture nuclear weapons.
- March 28 – The Shot (Duke–Kentucky): In what Sports Illustrated deemed the greatest college basketball game of all time, Christian Laettner sinks an overtime buzzer-beater to advance Duke to their fifth straight Final Four.
- March 31 – The Maintenance of Religious Harmony Act of Singapore comes into force.

=== April ===
- April 5
  - The Assembly of Bosnia and Herzegovina (without the presence of Serb political delegates) proclaims independence from the Socialist Federal Republic of Yugoslavia.
  - Bosnian War: Serb troops, following a mass rebellion of Serbs in Bosnia and Herzegovina against the Bosnian declaration of independence from Yugoslavia, besiege the city of Sarajevo.
  - President of Peru Alberto Fujimori issues Decree Law 25418, dissolving the Congress of the Republic of Peru, imposing censorship and having opposition politicians arrested, setting off the 1992 Peruvian constitutional crisis.
- April 6
  - The Republic of Ilirida is proclaimed by Albanian Macedonian activists in Struga, Republic of Macedonia.
  - Windows 3.1 is released to manufacturers by Microsoft.
- April 7 – The United States recognizes the independence of Slovenia, Croatia, and Bosnia and Herzegovina. The European Communities also recognizes Bosnia and Herzegovina.
- April 9
  - A jury in Miami, Florida, convicts former Panamanian ruler Manuel Noriega of assisting Colombia's cocaine cartel.
  - In the United Kingdom general election the Conservative Party led by Prime Minister of the United Kingdom John Major narrowly retains power.
- April 10
  - First Nagorno-Karabakh War: Maraga massacre – At least 43 Armenian civilians are killed as their village of Maraga, Azerbaijan, is captured and destroyed by the Azerbaijani Armed Forces.
  - A Provisional Irish Republican Army bomb explodes at the Baltic Exchange in the City of London; three are killed, 91 injured.
- April 13 – The 5.3 M_{w} Roermond earthquake affects the Netherlands, Germany and Belgium with a maximum Mercalli intensity of VII (Very strong).
- April 15 – The National Assembly of Vietnam adopts the 1992 Constitution of the Socialist Republic of Vietnam.
- April 16 – President of Afghanistan Mohammad Najibullah is ousted and detained by Muslim rebels moving towards Kabul, setting the stage for the civil war in Afghanistan (1992–96).
- April 20 – The Freddie Mercury Tribute Concert, held at Wembley Stadium, London, is televised live to over one billion people and raises millions of dollars for AIDS research.
- April 21 – The death of Grand Duke Vladimir Kirillovich of Russia results in a succession dispute between Nicholas Romanov, Prince of Russia and Vladimir's daughter Maria for the leadership of the Imperial Family of Russia.
- April 22 – Fuel leaking into a sewer causes a series of explosions in Guadalajara, Mexico; 215 are killed, 1,500 injured.
- April 27 – Betty Boothroyd becomes the first woman elected Speaker of the House of Commons of the United Kingdom.
- April 28 – The two remaining constituent republics of the former Socialist Federal Republic of Yugoslavia – Serbia and Montenegro – form a new state, named the Federal Republic of Yugoslavia (which in 2003 becomes Serbia and Montenegro), bringing to an end the official state union of Serbs, Croats, Slovenes, Montenegrins, Bosniaks and Macedonians that has existed since 1918 (with the exception of a brief occupation period during World War II).
- April 29
  - Los Angeles riots: The acquittal of four policemen in the Rodney King beating criminal trial triggers massive rioting in Los Angeles. The riots will last for six days resulting in 63 deaths and over $1 billion in damages before order is restored by the military.
  - In Sierra Leone, a group of young soldiers launch a military coup that sends president Joseph Saidu Momoh into exile in Guinea, and the National Provisional Ruling Council (NPRC) is established with 25-year-old Captain Valentine Strasser as its chairman and Head of State of the country.
- April 30 – Brčko bridge massacre: around 100 Croat and Bosniak civilians are blown up while crossing the bridge across the Sava in Brčko, Bosnia and Herzegovina.

=== May ===
- May 1 – Lithuania introduces a new temporary currency, the talonas.
- May 5
  - Russian leaders in Crimea declare their separation from Ukraine as a new republic. They withdraw the secession on May 10.
  - Armand Césari Stadium disaster in Bastia on Corsica: 18 people are killed and 2,300 are injured when one of the terraces collapses before a football match between SC Bastia and Olympique de Marseille.
- May 7
  - STS-49: Space Shuttle Endeavour makes its maiden flight, as a replacement for Space Shuttle Challenger.
  - In the Sydney River McDonald's murders in Nova Scotia, Canada, three McDonald's employees are killed and a fourth is left permanently disabled during a botched robbery.
- May 9
  - The United Nations Framework Convention on Climate Change is adopted in New York.
  - The Westray Mine in Plymouth, Nova Scotia, Canada, explodes, killing all 26 miners working the night shift.
- May 10 – Sweden wins the Ice Hockey World Championships in Czechoslovakia defeating Finland, 5–2, in the final game in Prague.
- May 13 – Falun Gong is introduced by Li Hongzhi in China.
- May 15 – The Collective Security Treaty Organization is established by six post-Soviet states belonging to the Commonwealth of Independent States (effective April 20, 1994).
- May 16–17 – Bosnian War: U.N. peacekeepers withdraw from Sarajevo.
- May 17 – Protests begin in Bangkok, Thailand, against the government of General Suchinda Kraprayoon, sparking a bloody crackdown.
- May 23 – Capaci bombing: A Mafia bomb on the autostrada in Sicily kills five people, including Italian anti-Mafia judge Giovanni Falcone.
- May 24
  - In Thailand, Suchinda Kraprayoon agrees to resign.
  - Parliamentary election held in Burkina Faso, for the first time since 1978.
- May 30 – United Nations Security Council Resolution 757 imposes economic sanctions on Yugoslavia in an effort to end its attacks on Bosnia and Herzegovina.

=== June ===
- June 2 – In a national referendum Denmark rejects the Maastricht Treaty by a narrow margin.
- June 3–14 – The Earth Summit is held in Rio de Janeiro.
- June 8 – The first World Oceans Day is celebrated, coinciding with the Earth Summit held in Rio de Janeiro, Brazil.
- June 10–26 – Sweden hosts the UEFA Euro 1992 football tournament, which is won by Denmark.
- June 16 – A "Joint Understanding" agreement on arms reduction is signed by U.S. president George H. W. Bush and Russian president Boris Yeltsin (this is later codified in START II).
- June 17
  - Two German relief workers held since 1989, Thomas Kemptner and Heinrich Struebig, are handed over to the German authorities after their release; they are the last Western hostages in Lebanon.
  - Violence breaks out between the African National Congress and the Inkatha Freedom Party in Boipatong, South Africa, leaving 45 dead.
- June 18 – Ireland votes for the Eleventh Amendment of the Constitution of Ireland to accept the Maastricht Treaty with a popular vote of over 69%.
- June 20
  - Estonia adopts the kroon as currency, becoming the first former Soviet Republic to replace the Soviet rouble.
  - In Paraguay the National Constituent Assembly approves the new Constitution of Paraguay.
- June 21 – Nelson Mandela announces that the African National Congress will halt negotiations with the government of South Africa following the Boipatong massacre of June 17.
- June 23 – The Israeli legislative election is won by the Israeli Labor Party under the leadership of Yitzhak Rabin, ousting a Likud government.
- June 25 – The Black Sea Economic Cooperation (BSEC) is founded.
- June 26 – Denmark beats Germany 2–0 in the final to win the 1992 UEFA European Football Championship at Ullevi Stadium in Gothenburg, Sweden.
- June 28 – Estonia holds a referendum on its constitution, which will come into effect on July 3.

=== July ===
- July 6–8 – The 18th G7 summit is held in Munich.
- July 6–29 – Iraq disarmament crisis: Iraq refuses a UN inspection team access to the Iraqi Ministry of Agriculture. UNSCOM claims that it has reliable information that the site contains archives related to illegal weapons activities. UN inspectors stage a 17-day "sit-in" outside of the building, but leave when their safety is threatened by Iraqi soldiers.
- July 10
  - In Miami, former Panamanian dictator Manuel Noriega is sentenced to 40 years in prison for participating in the illegal drug trade and racketeering.
  - The Giotto spacecraft flies past Comet 26P/Grigg–Skjellerup, gathering measurements about the comet.
- July 13 – Yitzhak Rabin becomes prime minister of Israel.
- July 16 – At the 1992 Democratic National Convention, Arkansas Governor Bill Clinton accepts his party's presidential nomination on behalf of the "forgotten middle class".
- July 17 – The Slovak National Council declares Slovakia an independent country, signaling the breakup of Czechoslovakia.
- July 19
  - Via D'Amelio bombing: A car bomb placed by the Sicilian Mafia (with the collaboration of Italian intelligence) kills judge Paolo Borsellino and five members of his police escort.
  - The Cabinet of Israel approves a freeze on new Israeli settlement in the occupied territories, a move expected to reinvigorate the Middle East Peace Process.
- July 20 – Václav Havel resigns as president of Czechoslovakia.
- July 21 – The Transnistria War ends with a ceasefire.
- July 22 – Near Medellín, Colombian drug lord Pablo Escobar escapes from his luxury prison, fearing extradition to the United States.
- July 23 – Abkhazia declares independence from Georgia.
- July 25–August 9 – The 1992 Summer Olympics are held in Barcelona, Catalonia, Spain.
- July 26 – Iraq agrees to allow UN weapons inspectors to search the Iraqi Agricultural Ministry building in Baghdad. When inspectors arrive on July 28 and 29, they find nothing and voice suspicions that Iraqi records have been removed.
- July 31
  - Georgia becomes the 179th member of the United Nations after seceding from the Soviet Union the previous year.
  - Thai Airways International Flight 311, an Airbus A310-300, crashes into a mountain north of Kathmandu, Nepal killing all 113 people on board.
  - China General Aviation Flight 7552 bound for Xiamen crashes soon after taking off from Nanjing Dajiaochang Airport, killing 108 of the 116 people on board.

=== August ===
- August 3–4 – Millions of black South Africans participate in a general strike called by the African National Congress to protest the lack of progress in negotiations with the government of State President of South Africa F. W. de Klerk.
- August 12 – Canada, Mexico and the United States announce that a deal has been reached on the North American Free Trade Agreement; this will be formally signed on December 17.
- August 18 – Prime Minister of the United Kingdom John Major announces the creation of Iraqi no-fly zones (→ Operation Southern Watch).
- August 24
  - Concordia University massacre: Valery Fabrikant murders four colleagues and seriously wounds another in a shooting at Concordia University, in Montreal, Quebec.
  - China and South Korea establish diplomatic relations.
- August 24–28 – Hurricane Andrew hits south Florida and Louisiana and dissipates over the Tennessee valley when it merges with a storm system; 65 are killed.
- August 29 – In Rostock, Germany, tens of thousands rally to protest neo-Nazi attacks on refugees and immigrants begun on August 22.

=== September ===
- September 1 – In Beijing, police arrest Shen Tong for his role in organizing the Tiananmen Square protests of 1989.
- September 2 – The 7.7 M_{w} Nicaragua earthquake affects the west coast of Nicaragua. With a M_{s}–M_{w} disparity of half a unit, this tsunami earthquake triggers a tsunami that causes most of the damage and casualties, with at least 116 killed. Average runup heights are 3–8 meters (9.8–26.2 ft).
- September 7
  - In Ciskei, members of the Ciskei Defence Force loyal to dictator Oupa Gqozo open fire into a crowd of anti-Gqozo protestors organized by the African National Congress, killing at least 28 people and wounding nearly 200.
  - President of Tajikistan Rahmon Nabiyev is forced to resign following weeks of clan and religious warfare that have left nearly 2,000 people dead.
- September 12 – In Peru, police arrest Abimael Guzmán, the leader of the Shining Path guerilla movement, who has evaded capture for 12 years.
- September 16 – Black Wednesday: The pound sterling and the Italian lira are forced out of the European Exchange Rate Mechanism.
- September 20 – French voters narrowly approve the Maastricht Treaty in the French Maastricht Treaty referendum.
- September 21 – Mexico establishes diplomatic relations with Vatican City, ending a break that has lasted over 130 years.
- September 28
  - Law enforcement officials in the United States, Colombia and Italy announce that they have arrested more than 165 people on money laundering charges related to cocaine trafficking.
  - Pakistan International Airlines Flight 268 crashes into a mountain while on approach to Tribhuvan International Airport in Kathmandu, Nepal. All 167 occupants on board were killed. The crash of PIA Flight 268 occurred just 2 months after Thai Airways International Flight 311 crashed into a mountain near Kathmandu under similar circumstances, killing all 113 occupants on board.
- September 29 – The Chamber of Deputies of Brazil votes to impeach President of Brazil Fernando Collor, the country's first democratically elected leader in 29 years. Vice President Itamar Franco becomes acting president.

=== October ===
- October 2 – A riot breaks out in the Carandiru Penitentiary in São Paulo, Brazil, resulting in the Carandiru massacre.
- October 3 – After performing a song protesting against alleged Catholic Church child sexual abuse, Irish singer-songwriter Sinéad O'Connor rips up a photograph of Pope John Paul II on the US television programme Saturday Night Live, causing huge controversy.
- October 4
  - The government of Mozambique signs the Rome General Peace Accords with leaders of RENAMO, ending the 16-year-old Mozambican Civil War.
  - Israeli cargo plane El Al Flight 1862 crashes into residential buildings in Amsterdam's Bijlmermeer, Netherlands, after taking off from Schiphol Airport and losing two engines, killing all 4 people on board and 39 on the ground.
- October 6 – Lennart Meri becomes the first President of Estonia after regaining independence. The Estonian Government in Exile resigns on the next day.
- October 7 – In Peru, Shining Path leader Abimael Guzmán is convicted of treason and sentenced to life in prison.
- October 11 – The Catechism of the Catholic Church is promulgated by Pope John Paul II with his apostolic constitution, Fidei depositum.
- October 12
  - In the Dominican Republic, Pope John Paul II celebrates the 500th anniversary of the meeting of two cultures.
  - The 5.8 mb Cairo earthquake affects the city with a maximum Mercalli intensity of VIII (Severe), leaving 545 dead and 6,512 injured.
- October 19 – The Chinese Communist Party promotes several market-oriented reformers to the Politburo Standing Committee of the Chinese Communist Party, signaling a defeat for hard-line ideologues.
- October 20 – The last Yugoslav Army troops leave Croatia.
- October 21 – 150,000 coal miners march in London to protest government plans to close coal mines and reduce the number of miners.
- October 23 – Emperor of Japan Akihito begins the first imperial visit to China, telling a Beijing audience he feels deep sorrow for the suffering of the Chinese people during World War II.
- October 25 – Lithuania holds a referendum on its first constitution after declaring independence from the Soviet Union in 1990.
- October 26 – In a national referendum, voters in Canada reject the Charlottetown Accord.
- October 28 – Hans-Adam II, Prince of Liechtenstein threatens to dissolve the Landtag of Liechtenstein and dismiss the government over disagreements regarding a referendum on Liechtenstein's accession to the European Economic Area.
- October 31 – Pope John Paul II issues an apology and lifts the 1633 edict of the Inquisition against Galileo Galilei.

=== November ===
- November 3 – In the 1992 United States presidential election, Democratic Arkansas governor Bill Clinton defeats Republican president George H. W. Bush and Independent Ross Perot.
- November 8 – More than 350,000 people rally in Berlin to protest right-wing violence against immigrants; stones and eggs are thrown at President of Germany Richard von Weizsäcker and Chancellor of Germany Helmut Kohl.
- November 11 – The Church of England votes to allow women to become priests.
- November 13
  - The government of Peru announces it has arrested a small group of army officers who were plotting the assassination of President Alberto Fujimori.
  - A report by the World Meteorological Organization reports an unprecedented level of ozone depletion in both the Arctic and Antarctic.
- November 14 – In poor conditions caused by Cyclone Forrest, Vietnam Airlines Flight 474 crashes near Nha Trang, killing 30.
- November 15 – The Lithuanian parliamentary election sees the Communists of the Democratic Labour Party of Lithuania, led by Algirdas Brazauskas, return to power.
- November 18 – Russian president Boris Yeltsin releases the flight data recorder (FDR) and cockpit voice recorder (CVR) of Korean Air Flight 007, which was shot down by the Soviets in 1983.
- November 24 – In China, China Southern Airlines Flight 3943, a China Southern Airlines domestic flight, crashes, killing all 141 people on board.
- November 25
  - The Czechoslovak Federal Assembly votes to split the country into two separate states of the Czech Republic and Slovakia, to take effect on January 1, 1993.
  - In a national referendum related to abortion, voters in Ireland reject the proposed Twelfth Amendment of the Constitution Bill 1992 but approve the Thirteenth Amendment of the Constitution of Ireland and the Fourteenth Amendment of the Constitution of Ireland.
- November 27 – The government of Venezuela puts down a coup attempt by a group of Air Force officers who have bombed the presidential palace.

=== December ===
- December 1 – South Korea and South Africa reestablish diplomatic relations. South Korea previously had diplomatic relations with South Africa from 1961 to 1978, when they were severed by the former due to the latter's policy of apartheid.
- December 3 – UN Security Council Resolution 794 is unanimously passed, approving a coalition of United Nations peacekeepers led by the United States to form UNITAF, tasked with ensuring that humanitarian aid gets distributed and establishing peace in Somalia.
- December 4 – US President George Bush announces the deployment of US troops to Africa as part of the United Task Force (UNITAF); UNITAF troops land at Mogadishu on 9 December.
- December 6 – Demolition of Babri Masjid: Extremist Hindu activists in India demolish Babri Masjid – a 16th-century mosque in Ayodhya which has been used as a temple since 1949 – leading to widespread communal violence, including the Bombay riots, in all killing over 1,500 people.
- December 12 – The 7.8 M_{w} Flores earthquake affects the Lesser Sunda Islands in Indonesia with a maximum Mercalli intensity of VIII (Severe) leaving at least 2,500 dead. A destructive tsunami with wave heights of 25 m (82 ft) follows.
- December 16 – The Czech National Council adopts the Constitution of the Czech Republic.
- December 18 – The South Korean presidential election is won by Kim Young-sam, the first non-military candidate elected since 1961.
- December 21 – In Yugoslavia, President of Serbia Slobodan Milošević defeats Milan Panić in the Serbian presidential election.
- December 22 – The Archives of Terror are discovered by Martín Almada in Asunción, detailing the fates of thousands of Latin Americans who have been secretly kidnapped, tortured and killed by the security services of Argentina, Bolivia, Brazil, Chile, Paraguay and Uruguay in Operation Condor.
- December 28 – Actress Daniella Perez is murdered in Rio de Janeiro, after being stabbed 18 times with scissors by actor Guilherme de Pádua and his then-wife Paula Thomaz. The crime shocked Brazil, due to both the victim and the murderer being romantic partners in the telenovela De Corpo e Alma, which aired on TV Globo.
- December 29 – Brazil's president Fernando Collor de Mello is found guilty on charges that he stole more than $32 million from the government, preventing him from holding any elected office for eight years. Collor resigns the presidency hours before the sentence to be passed by the Supreme Federal Court.

== Nobel Prizes ==

- Physics – Georges Charpak
- Chemistry – Rudolph A. Marcus
- Medicine – Edmond H. Fischer, Edwin G. Krebs
- Literature – Derek Walcott
- Peace – Rigoberta Menchú
- Economics – Gary Becker

== Sources ==
- 1992 House by Bill Frolick – article about 1992 from The New Yorker magazine.
