= National Population Program =

Former population control policy in Peru

- Programa Nacional de Población
- Logo of the National Program for Reproductive Health and Family Planning (PNSRPF)
- Type of project: Human population control
- Country: Peru
- Key people: Alberto Fujimori; Vladimiro Montesinos
- Launched: 1987
- Closed: 2002

The National Population Program (Spanish: Programa Nacional de Población), known as the National Program for Reproductive Health and Family Planning (Spanish: Programa Nacional de Salud Reproductiva y Planificación Familiar (PNSRPF)) from 1996 to 1998, was a project conducted in Peru in through the 1990s to reduce population growth as a way of meeting international demographic standards. Plans for the "total extermination" of impoverished Peruvians through sterilization were first included in Plan Verde, a secret military proposal created to establish a military junta. Compulsory sterilization, which is a method that forces individuals to partake in sterilization operations, was the main method employed by the Peruvian government to decrease population.

Compulsory sterilization in the case of Peru under President Alberto Fujimori was a program strictly intended to lower national population growth by decreasing the fertility rate among women. The program targeted Peru's impoverished, indigenous, and marginalized communities and therefore implied the government's intention to diminish the rural population in order to enhance future economic growth. Estimates vary, but it is thought that up to 300,000 Peruvian women were compulsorily sterilized by the Peruvian government during that time.

== Background ==
=== Velasco government ===
In 1968, the military overthrew President Fernando Belaúnde Terry and remained in occupation of the government for an entire decade. Within this decade-long military regime under appointed President Juan Velasco Alvarado, the Peruvian government made significant leftist reforms and intended to give justice to the poor and outlined the first defined population program in Peru's history. President Velasco rejected the popular population control theories at the time, adopting a population program that was pronatalist and in line with teachings of the Catholic Church. Velasco also rejected population control efforts on grounds that they were imperialist activities being performed by the United States; the United States had been increasingly promoting population control in Latin America at the time.

=== National Population Policy Guidelines ===
Following the fall of the Velasco government, the Plan of Action of the 1974 World Population Conference organized by the United Nations motivated the Velasco's successor, Francisco Morales-Bermúdez, to undertake population control policy with the aim to benefit Peru, with the National Population Policy Guidelines of 1976, DS 625-76-SA. The new guidelines reversed the policy of the Velasco government; contraceptives were promoted and planned families were promoted while Malthusianist policies were adopted, arguing that population control was necessary for economic growth. In 1979, Morales Bermúdez government adopted a new national constitution and focused on regaining economic strength within the country.

=== Law on National Population Policy ===
Under this new constitution, population growth and families' rights to fertility were topics of political concern. As a result of this new focus, the Ministry of Health began to offer public services towards family planning in 1983. On 6 July 1985, the National Population Policy Law, DL No. 346, was passed. The population policy law, which continues to be in effect, intends to promote "a balanced relationship between population size, structure and distribution, and socio-economic development." The law also specifically catered to the enhancement and protection of the human rights of Peruvian citizens with its promise to ensure voluntary and informed consent in issues regarding contraception and health services. However, Peru's government was still in the midst of internal conflict. Due to a lack of political support, there was not enough funding for the programs needed to carry out the National Population Policy Law. As a result, implementation of the law remained hampered until the presidency of Alberto Fujimori.

=== Demographics ===
By 1992, Peru would be ranked as having the fifth highest population in the Latin American region with an estimated number of 22,767,543 inhabitants. The country is generally split into three geographic regions: the coastal region, the highlands, and the selva (meaning forest, the Amazon region). As of 1990, the demographics for these areas were as follows: 53% of the nation's population in the coastal region, 36% percent in the highlands, and 11% in the rainforest.

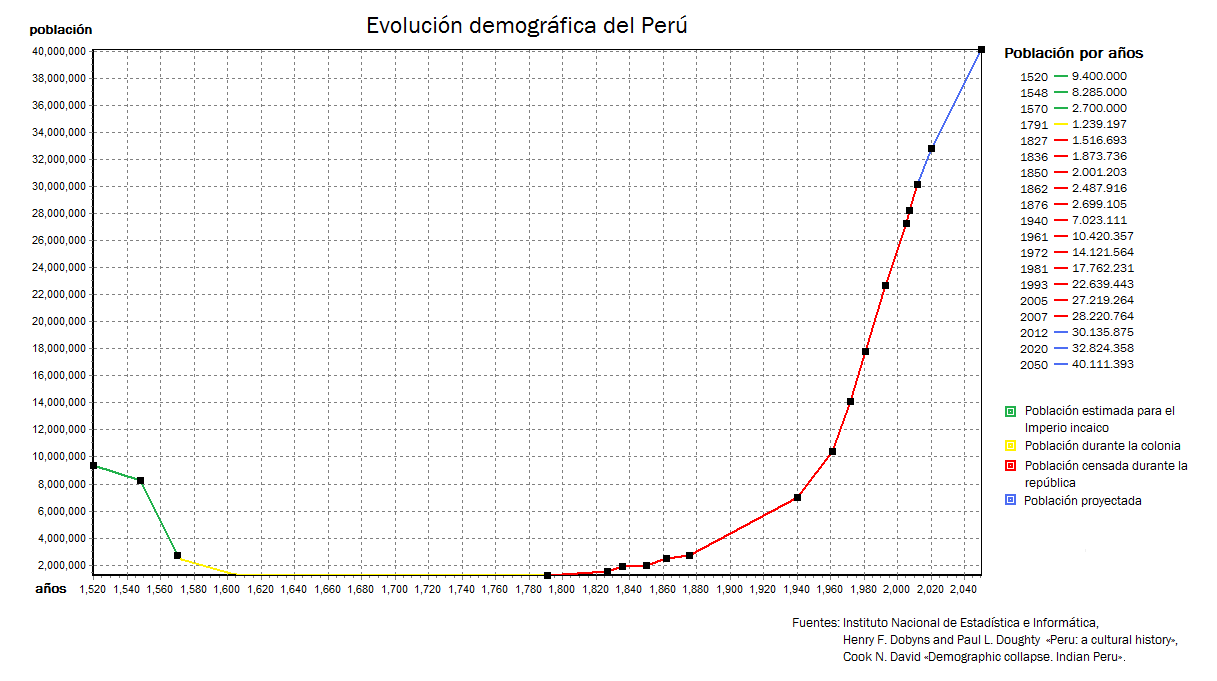

The issue of population growth in Peru is directly connected with the social, political and economic inequality within the country. The average number of childbirths for Peruvian women is higher than that of Latin America's general average and also higher than the average of women in the United States. As for the comparison of birth rates within the country, 1.7 is the average number of children per woman with a university or college education while the average is 6.2 children per woman for those who have little or no education. Women living in rural areas, mostly of indigenous descent, have the highest average birth rate at 7.1 children per woman.

In the Andean countryside, the maternal mortality ratio is "very high for the region" at 185 deaths per 100,000 live births. In addition, there are 66 abortions for every 100 live births, even though abortion is illegal in Peru and therefore is most likely conducted with high risk.

== Projects ==
=== National Population Program (1987–1990) ===
Two years after the Law on National Population Policy was signed into law in July 1985, the National Population Program, or Programa Nacional de Población, was established in 1987 through a Presidential Population Commission of President Alan García. Due to the various crises occurring at the time, only some of the programs were able to be implemented. The García government agreed with the Catholic Church that abortions and sterilizations would be prohibited in Peru. The main strategy of the initial National Population Program under the García administration focused on the dispersal of contraceptives and minor family planning programs.

==== Plan Verde ====
The Peruvian armed forces grew frustrated with the inability of the García administration to handle the nation's crises and began to draft a plan to overthrow his government. According to Peruvian sociologist and political analyst Fernando Rospigliosi, Peru's business elites held relationships with the military planners, leaving an impression that a neoliberal economy must be adopted in Peru.

Between 1988 and 1989, a coup d'état was initially planned to oust President García. In October 1989, a group of the armed forces finalized plans to overthrow the García government with a volume of the plan titled Driving Peru into the XXI century. The goals were to establish Peru as a developed country through the turn of the twenty-first century by establishing a neoliberal economy with policies similar to Chile's or those proposed by Mario Vargas Llosa. This volume also details plans to sterilize impoverished citizens in what Rospigliosi described as "ideas frankly similar to the Nazis", with the military writing that "the general use of sterilization processes for culturally backward and economically impoverished groups is convenient", describing these groups as "unnecessary burdens" and that "given their incorrigible character and lack of resources ... there is only their total extermination". The extermination of vulnerable Peruvians was described by planners as "an economic interest, it is an essential constant in the strategy of power and development of the state".

Plan Verde was later redeveloped to include Alberto Fujimori as the head of a "civil-military" government. Peruvian magazine Oiga reported that Fujimori was to be directed on accepting the military's plan at least twenty-four hours before his inauguration. Fujimori would go on to adopt many of the policies outlined in Plan Verde.

=== National Population Program (1991–1995) ===
Since his 1990 electoral campaign, Fujimori and the Catholic Church disapproved of each other, with the Fujimori completely disregarding the Church's views on sterilization as a mutilation of the body. In 1991, a new National Population Program was developed by the National Population Council. With the compliance of Fujimori, plans for a coup as designed in Plan Verde were prepared over a two-year period and finally executed during the 1992 Peruvian coup d'état, which ultimately established a civilian-military regime and began the institution of objectives presented in Plan Verde. The coup, however, resulted with USAID stopping its funding of population programs in Peru. In 1993, a National Report on Population and Development of the Fujimori government argued that the previous program was insufficient and promoted large expansions for the program.

Although Fujimori was a supporter of family planning in public, the new National Population Program and its specific goals and strategies seemingly counteracted the law's initial purpose of preserving individual human rights.

==== Goals ====
With the newly drafted version of the National Population Program (Programa Nacional de Población) under Fujimori, goals were specified in the context of demographics. The Peruvian Ministry of Health's program manager stated that impoverished indigenous women are "poor and producing more poor people. The President is aware that the government cannot fight poverty without reducing the poor people's fertility. Thus, demographic goals are a combination of the population's right to access family planning and the government's anti-poverty strategy." The program was targeted towards poor women who had "little or no formal education". Thus, the program intended to:

- reduce population growth rate from 2.1% to 2%
- reduce the total fertility rate from 3.5% to 3.3%
- reduce maternal and child mortality rates
- foster "equitable socio-economic opportunities" between men and women

==== Strategies ====
The National Population program called on both public and private sectors to assist in its strategic implementation. Furthermore, seven strategies were laid out as guidelines to reach the intended demographic goals:

- reproductive health and family planning
- communication and information dissemination
- decentralization of population policy
- education
- production of research and statistics
- advancement of women and youth
- environmental protection

=== National Program for Reproductive Health and Family Planning (1995–1998) ===
Following the 1995 re-election of President Fujimori and the approval of his speech at the World Population Conference in Beijing among international observers and Peruvian feminists, population control measures and sterilizations increased dramatically. Fujimori's new rhetoric provided an opening of international funding for population programs, specifically from USAID, following the initial disapproval of his governance on the global stage after his self-coup. The new plan, the National Program for Reproductive Health and Family Planning (PNSRPF), largely followed the existing National Population Program, though it utilized modern and more progressive wording in order to establish support. The new approach of the Fujimori government viewed sterilization as a method of statistical poverty reduction instead of a reproductive right.

==== Planning ====
The Fujimori government, especially the offices of the presidency and prime minister, determined that sterilizations were a primary tool for economic development, revealing their intentions regarding population control. In a previous 1993 report, a National Report on Population and Development of the Fujimori government argued that the previous program was insufficient and promoted large expansions for the program. That same year, the prime minister's report titled "Basic Social Policy Guidelines" was largely influential on population policy, arguing that population projections would leave Peru unable to provide basic social services. The "Social Policy: Situation and Perspectives" document also presented that permanent birth control targeted for the poor was one of thirteen main economic recovery policies of the Fujimori administration.

The government also prepared propaganda outside of health clinics that showed contrasting images of an indigenous family with multiple children living impoverished in unsanitary conditions beside a separate image of a European-appearing family with two children holding schoolbooks outside of a modern home with a well-manicured lawn. Government propaganda also showed images of the desired effect of family planning showing families with only sons, knowing that indigenous women carry the traditions of their culture.

==== Implementation ====
President Fujimori placed pressure upon PNSRPF program staff to meet sterilization quotas and workers faced poor conditions, resulting with human rights abuses often occurring. The Fujimori government used sterilization rates as an indicator of poverty reduction, with the Fujimori-appointed program director Eduardo Yong Motta contacting clinics weekly demanding increased quotas according to staff. Fujimori's well-known micromanaging techniques also resulted with the president even visiting regional program leaders directly to demand increased sterilizations.

PNSRPF staff were hired on contracts based on sterilization quotas and were often provided bonus payments during sterilization campaigns. Most of the personnel hired were also not properly trained and much of the equipment used was outdated and lacking in quality. The counseling services provided to patients were also backed by poorly trained staff and many women were not given "quality information prior to procedures". When sterilizations were given, they were done so in a hurriedly manner. "Teams were dispatched one day at a time to perform procedures" and therefore attempted to cover large masses of women in rural areas in very minimal amounts of time. As a result, patients were denied sufficient and proper treatment and rarely received follow-up care.

A former physician for the Ministry of Health confirms these practices:

We were required to perform a certain number of sterilizations each month. This was obligatory and if we did not comply, we were fired. Many providers did not inform women that they were going to be sterilized - they told them that the procedure was something else. But I felt this was wrong. I preferred to offer women a bag of rice to convince them to accept the procedure and explained to them beforehand what was going to happen.

Bribery, threats, and deception towards patients were methods used in the implementation of such procedures by medical personnel. A large number of the indigenous Peruvian population speaks Quechua and are unable to read, write, and sometimes even communicate in Spanish. Many women were deceived by personnel and told that the procedures were operations other than sterilization. There were also instances of men being told they would be fined or jailed if they did not order their wives to have the operation.

==== Outcome ====
The number of annual sterilizations in Peru rose drastically. Prior to the program, there were less than 15,000 sterilizations performed per year and women could only have the operation performed "if they had a health risk, four or more children, or were above a certain age". However, after 1995 when sterilizations began to be performed, there were no pre-existing conditions necessary for sterilizations other than that women had to be considered part of Peru's poor and disenfranchised community. In addition, the number of annual sterilization procedures rose after the program's implementation from 15,000 to 67,000 in 1996 and 115,000 in 1997. In total, more than 300,000 Peruvians were victims of forced sterilization in the 1990s, with the majority being affected by the National Population Program.

=== National Population Plan (1998–2002) ===
The program was reformed under the guidance of the Ministry for the Advancement of Women and Human Development (PROMUDEH) following recommendations from the International Conference on Population and Development in 1994.

In 1998, the Peruvian government and the Ministry of Health agreed to reform the controversial aspects of the National Population Program, establishing the Plan Nacional de Población. The elimination of numeric goals was arguably the most important change to the program as demographic goals and quotas were no longer needed. While sterilization was not eliminated, the reforms for the implementation of the procedure included:

- new counseling guidelines
- new consent forms
- two counseling sessions for patients
- 72-hour waiting period between second counseling session and sterilization
- 24-hour hospitalization after the procedure
- certifications for health facilities and physicians

The plan was to introduce more sexual education and to include more males into the project to ensure that a minimum of 10% began using contraceptive measures. Finally, the language of the National Population Program was also changed. Rather than a target of 2.5 births per woman as it was written in the original law in 1991, the reformed program intended to "reach a total fertility rate compatible with the individual reproductive intentions".

== Controversy ==
=== Forced sterilizations ===
The plan's forced sterilization of vulnerable groups through the Programa Nacional de Población has been variably described as an ethnic cleansing or genocidal operation. According to Back and Zavala, the plan was an example of ethnic cleansing as it targeted indigenous and rural women. Jocelyn E. Getgen of Cornell University wrote that the systemic nature of sterilizations and the mens rea of officials who drafted the plan proved an act of genocide. The Centro Amazónico de Antropología y Aplicación Práctica non-profit stated that the act "was the largest genocide since [Peru's] colonization". At least 300,000 Peruvians were victims of forced sterilization in the 1990s, with the majority being affected by the PNSRPF. The policy of sterilizations resulted in a generational shift that included a smaller younger generation that could not provide economic stimulation to rural areas, making such regions more impoverished.

In 1997, the newspaper La República reported on the human rights violations of the National Population Program and sparked a nationwide debate that brought the government's actions to the forefront of Peruvian media. Because the procedures of the National Population Program went against Peru's constitutional law and violated human rights law, foreign donors threatened to suspend support for any aspects of the program that were sterilization related. Many public organizations, such as the Flora Tristán Peruvian Women's Center and the Comité de América Latina y el Caribe para la Defensa de los Derechos de la Mujer (CLADEM), began to voice their concerns for the program and attempt to obtain evidence against the Ministry of Health and the Peruvian government for their covert actions.

=== Foreign involvement ===
Without full support from the Catholic Church, outside funding was required for the program's success. International pressure to meet population standards became evident when the International Monetary Fund suggested that the Peruvian government cut funding for social services to allow for more spending in areas called for by the program. In addition, the United States Agency for International Development (USAID) contributed US$85 million between 1994 and 1998. Because the financial support from foreign donors brought economic and political pressure upon Fujimori to meet international standards, the plan to decrease population growth consequently became more focused on quotas than individual rights and health issues. In documents provided by the Freedom of Information Act, investigators cited E. Liagin, who reported that from 1993 to 1998, "USAID's own internal files reveal that in 1993 the US basically took over Peru's national health system" during the period of forced sterilizations, with E. Liagin concluding that it was "virtually inconceivable that sterilization abuses could have occurred in the systematic way that has been documented without the knowledge of USAID local administrators and their counterparts in Washington".

In 1998 after facing pressure following investigations by the Population Research Institute, USAID ceased funding for sterilizations in Peru. Sterilizations continued until President Fujimori fled to Japan in 2000.

== Reform ==
The Peruvian government began the Specific Population Plans and Laws effort for 2003 onward, using specific programs to target needs of special population needs.
