= Plan Verde =

Peruvian clandestine military operation

- Part of Internal conflict in Peru
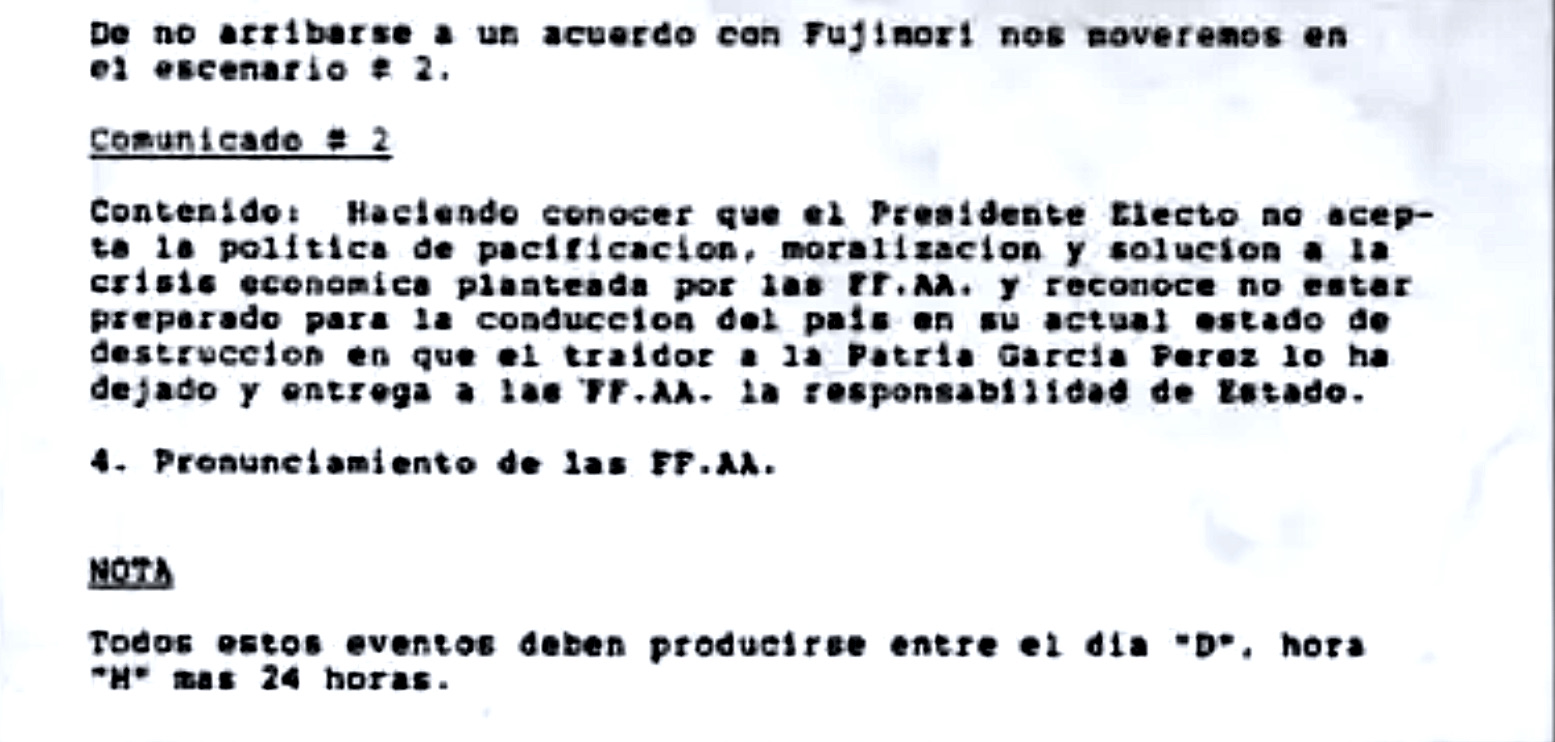
- Portion of the Final Coordination Sheet addendum drafted following the election of Alberto Fujimori
- Location: Peru
- Planned by: Armed Forces of Peru
- Objective: Establishment of neoliberal economy; Control of mass media in Peru; Compulsory sterilization of vulnerable populations

Plan Verde (Spanish for "Green Plan", IPA: [ˌplam ˈbeɾ.ð̞e]) was a clandestine military operation developed by the armed forces of Peru during the internal conflict in Peru; it involved the control or censorship of media, the coerced sterilization of vulnerable populations and neoliberal economic reforms under the control of a military junta in Peru. Initially drafted in October 1989 in preparation for a coup d'état to overthrow President Alan García, large parts of the plan were implemented after the victory of political outsider Alberto Fujimori in the 1990 Peruvian general election and his established control following the 1992 Peruvian self-coup. Most notably, the Fujimori administration carried a campaign of sterilization affecting more than 300,000 people.

Plan Verde was first leaked to the public by Peruvian magazine Oiga, shortly after the coup, with a small number of other media outlets also reporting access to the plan's documents.

== Background ==
Under the military government of Juan Velasco Alvarado, Peru's debt increased greatly due to excessive borrowing and the 1970s energy crisis. In 1975, Francisco Morales Bermúdez led a military coup that overthrew President Velasco, with his military faction being supported by existing economic elites and holding conservative, neoliberal values. Fernando Belaúnde was elected president in 1980 and by the end of his administration in 1985, the majority of military officers were more conservative due to the increased polarization experienced between them and far-left guerrilla groups in the internal conflict in Peru.

The economic policy of President Alan García distanced Peru from international markets further in the late 1980s, resulting in lower foreign investment in the country. Under García, Peru experienced hyperinflation and increased confrontations with the Maoist Shining Path terrorist group, leading the country towards high levels of instability.

== Planning ==
The Peruvian armed forces grew frustrated with the inability of the García administration to handle the nation's crises, drafting a plan to overthrow his government and replace it with an authoritarian government. According to Peruvian sociologist and political analyst Fernando Rospigliosi, Peru's business elites held relationships with the military planners, with Rospigliosi writing that businesses "probably provided the economic ideas which [the military] agreed with, the necessity of a liberal economic program as well as the installment of an authoritarian government which would impose order". Burt writes that the plan was created to "radically restructure state-society relations along neoliberal lines."

Plan Verde consisted of three volumes of documents prepared by an influential sector of the Peruvian armed forces, with each volume being an update based on the conditions experienced in Peru at the time.

=== Volumes ===
==== Driving Peru into the 21st century ====
Between 1988 and 1989, a coup d'état was initially planned to oust President García. In October 1989, a group of the armed forces finalized plans to overthrow the García government with a plan titled Driving Peru into the 21st century. This volume consists of eight chapters and four addendums.

The goals were to establish Peru as a developed country through the turn of the twenty-first century by establishing a neoliberal economy with policies similar to Chile's or those proposed by Mario Vargas Llosa. This volume also details plans to sterilize impoverished citizens in what Rospigliosi described as "ideas frankly similar to [those of] the Nazis", with the military writing that "the general use of sterilization processes for culturally backward and economically impoverished groups is convenient", describing these groups as "unnecessary burdens" and that "given their incorrigible character and lack of resources ... there is only their total extermination". The extermination of vulnerable Peruvians was described by planners as "an economic interest, it is an essential constant in the strategy of power and development of the state".

==== Intelligence Appraisal ====
The second volume of Plan Verde was titled Intelligence Appraisal that had four chapters and seventeen addendums. This volume focused on political analysis, public opinion, operation scenarios, and other objectives. These objectives included locations to be captured and targets to be killed, with a list of politicians and union members included. Addendums were documented one day following the first round of presidential elections of 8 April 1990, another three days after the second round of elections of 10 June and a final addendum titled Final Coordination Sheet was created on 27 July 1990, one day before the inauguration of Alberto Fujimori.

Through this volume and its addendums, modifications were made from dissolving both the executive and legislative branches to instead only dissolving congress.

==== The Strategic Council of State ====
The third and final volume titled The Strategic Council of State provides the role of governing entities in the plan and a set of Q&As. A plan to establish a "civil-military government" is detailed; military-appointed presidents and ministers who "can be changed or be victims of attacks" were designated to be "drivers" to operate the state, described as a "vehicle". Meanwhile, a "shadow" government would be operated by the military "out of the enemy's line of sight" in order to maintain a continuity of government.

=== Objectives ===
In summary, some of the main objectives of Plan Verde were as follows:

- Economic reforms led by the armed forces similar to Chile
- Increased prevention of drug trafficking to appease the United States government
- Control of mass media in Peru through a System of Control, Security and Propaganda and creating an atmosphere of self-censorship in Peru
- Limiting population growth through the sterilization and "total extermination" of impoverished Peruvians

== Implementation ==
The idea would have been to establish a regime that would basically apply the guidelines contained in the Plan, but keeping Fujimori in the presidency and an appearance of a democratic and civil government. The advantage – for the coup plotters – was that it avoided the internal and external conflicts derived from establishing a government of the armed forces. The disadvantage was that it did not allow them to carry out all their proposals comfortably.

— Fernando Rospigliosi

The coup initially included in the plan was opposed by Anthony C. E. Quainton, the United States Ambassador to Peru. Military planners also decided against the coup as they expected Mario Vargas Llosa, a neoliberal candidate, to be elected in the 1990 Peruvian general election. President García was also able to detect and deter some elements of a coup.

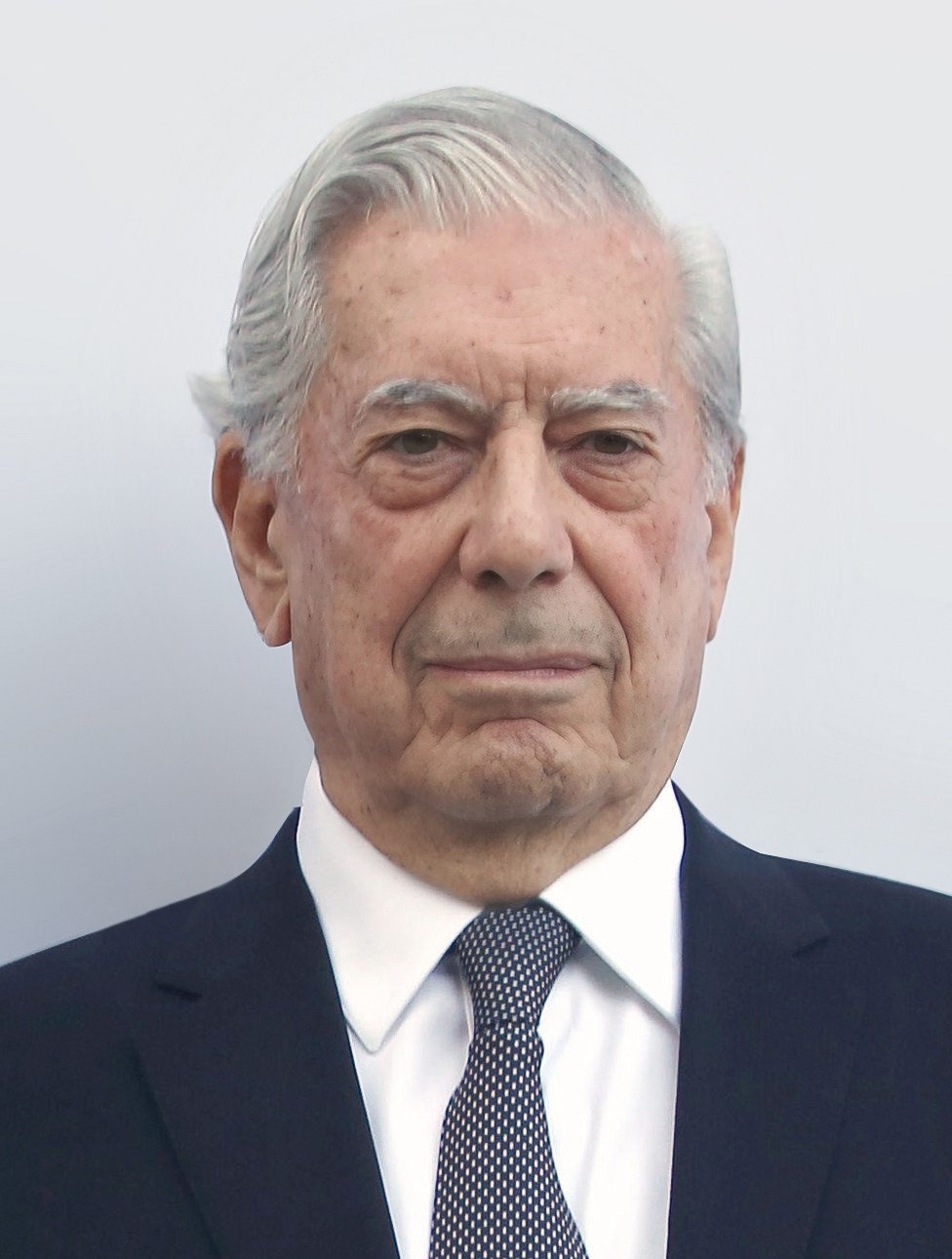
Mario Vargas Llosa, who was reportedly supported in initial plans

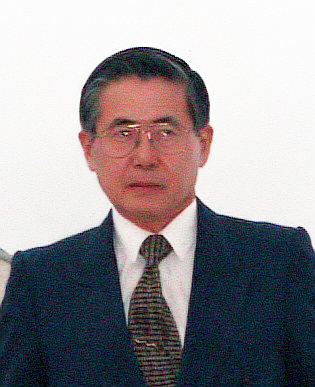
Alberto Fujimori, who was ultimately included in the plan

During his campaigning for the 1990 election, Alberto Fujimori expressed concern about the proposed neoliberal policies of his opponent Mario Vargas Llosa. Vargas Llosa later reported that Ambassador Quainton personally told him that allegedly leaked documents of the Central Intelligence Agency (CIA) purportedly being supportive of Fujimori's candidacy were authentic. Rendón writes that the United States supported Fujimori because of his relationship with Vladimiro Montesinos, a former Peruvian intelligence officer of the National Intelligence Service (SIN) who was charged with spying on the Peruvian military for the Central Intelligence Agency. In summary, Rendón writes, "If Vargas Llosa with liberal democracy was very polarizing and a danger to American interests in the region, Fujimori with authoritarianism was very consensual and more in line with American interests in Peru and the region". According to Rospigliosi, Montesinos was not initially involved with Plan Verde, but his ability to resolve issues for the military resulted with the armed forces tasking Montesinos with implementing the plan with Fujimori.

Peruvian magazine Oiga reported that following the election, the armed forces were unsure of Fujimori's willingness to fulfill their objectives, writing in an evaluation note on 13 June 1990 that "We cannot expect anything certain from Cambio 90 and the country is not there for more economic experiments". According to Oiga, the armed forces finalized plans on 18 June 1990 involving multiple scenarios for a coup to be executed on 27 July 1990, the day prior to Fujimori's inauguration.

In one of the scenarios, titled "Negotiation and agreement with Fujimori. Bases of negotiation: concept of directed Democracy and Market Economy", Fujimori was to be directed on accepting the military's plan at least twenty-four hours before his inauguration, emphasizing directed democracy and a market economy. According to Schulte-Bockholt, General Nicolás de Bari Hermoza and Vladimiro Montesinos were responsible for the relationship between the military and Fujimori. Rospigliosi writes that SIN head General Edwin "Cucharita" Díaz beside Montesinos also played a key role with making Fujimori abide by the military's demands.

Díaz and Montesinos allegedly convinced Fujimori that he was being targeted by the Túpac Amaru Revolutionary Movement and made Fujimori stay at the Círculo Militar, limiting his access to only military officials. Rospigliosi states "an understanding was established between Fujimori, Montesinos and some of the military officers" involved in Plan Verde prior to Fujimori's inauguration. Montesinos and SIN officials would ultimately assume the armed force's position in the plan, placing SIN operatives into military leadership roles.

After taking office, Fujimori abandoned the economic platform he promoted during his campaign, adopting more aggressive neoliberal policies than those espoused by his competitor in the election. Fujimori went on to adopt many of the policies outlined in Plan Verde. With the compliance of Fujimori, plans for a coup as designed in Plan Verde were prepared over a two-year period and finally executed during the 1992 Peruvian coup d'état, which ultimately established a civilian-military regime and began the institution of objectives presented in Plan Verde. The implementation of various objectives were supported by the United States Agency for International Development (USAID).

=== Economy ===
This society is collapsing, without a doubt, ... But the problems here are so entrenched that you have to have a collapse before you can implement fundamental changes in the political system.

— Hernando de Soto

Hernando de Soto, the founder of one of the first neoliberal organizations in Latin America, Institute for Liberty and Democracy (ILD), began to receive assistance from Ronald Reagan's administration, with the National Endowment for Democracy's Center for International Private Enterprise (CIPE) providing his ILD with funding and education for advertising campaigns. Between 1988 and 1995, de Soto and the ILD were mainly responsible for some four hundred initiatives, laws, and regulations that led to significant changes in Peru's economic system. Under Fujimori, de Soto served as "the President's personal representative", with The New York Times describing de Soto as an "overseas salesman" for Fujimori in 1990, writing that he had represented the government when meeting with creditors and United States representatives. Others dubbed de Soto as the "informal president" for Fujimori. De Soto proved to be influential to Fujimori, who began to repeat de Soto's advocacy for deregulating the Peruvian economy.

The Fujimori government received a $715 million grant from USAID on 29 September 1990 for the Policy Analysis, Planning and Implementation Project (PAPI) that was developed "to support economic policy reform in the country". PAPI funding was primarily utilized for "studies, training, and dissemination efforts" by the Fujimori government. In a recommendation to Fujimori, de Soto called for a "shock" to Peru's economy. De Soto convinced then-president Fujimori to travel to New York City in a meeting organized by the Peruvian Javier Pérez de Cuéllar, secretary general of the United Nations, where they met with the heads of the International Monetary Fund, the World Bank, and the Inter-American Development Bank, who convinced him to follow the guidelines for economic policy set by the international financial institutions. The policies included a 300 percent tax increase, unregulated prices and privatizing two-hundred and fifty state-owned entities. The policies of de Soto led to the immediate suffering of poor Peruvians who saw unregulated prices increase rapidly. Those living in poverty saw prices increase so much that they could no longer afford food. The New York Times wrote that de Soto advocated for the collapse of Peru's society, with the economist saying that an atmosphere of political and social crisis was necessary to support the policies of Fujimori.

With the funding and support of USAID, the Apoyo Institute and the Confederación Nacional de Instituciones Empresariales Privadas (CONFIEP) proposed a new economic model to be established in the 1993 Constitution of Peru. As PAPI concluded in 1997, USAID determined that PAPI assisted with the "preparation of legislative texts" and "contributed to the emergence of a private sector advisory role" in Peru's economy. The policies promoted by de Soto and implemented by Fujimori eventually caused macroeconomic stability and a reduction in the rate of inflation, though Peru's poverty rate remained largely unchanged with over half of the population living in poverty in 1998.

=== Control of media ===
Following the 1992 coup, Peruvian newspapers, radio and television stations were occupied by the military beginning at 10:30pm on 5 April and remained for forty hours until 7 April, limiting initial response from domestic media. During the period, all newspapers were printed under military observation and contained similar content; every publication was ordered to not include the word "coup". According to of Manuel D'Ornellas of Expreso in 1994, the military's oversight of the media was only momentary due to international condemnation Fujimori received.

Through the remainder of Fujimori's tenure, his government would pay media organizations for positive coverage and to assist with maintaining the presidency. In 1994, Fujimori instituted a policy of tax breaks for media organizations that allowed government advertising on their platforms, with Fujimori subsequently receiving increased promotion. Secret videos of Montesinos paying media executives were eventually released to the public, showing Fujimori's closest advisor giving them bundles of cash in exchange for support and the firing of critical journalists. Payoffs and promises of legal leniency were made to multiple chicha press tabloids, the newspaper Expreso and the television channels Global Television, Latina Televisión, América Televisión, and Panamericana Televisión.

=== Forced sterilization ===
The plan's forced sterilization of vulnerable groups through the Programa Nacional de Población has been variably described as an ethnic cleansing or genocidal operation. According to Back and Zavala, the plan was an example of ethnic cleansing as it targeted indigenous and rural women. Jocelyn E. Getgen of Cornell University wrote that the systemic nature of sterilizations and the mens rea of officials who drafted the plan proved an act of genocide. The Centro Amazónico de Antropología y Aplicación Práctica non-profit stated that the act "was the largest genocide since [Peru's] colonization". At least 300,000 Peruvians were victims of forced sterilization in the 1990s, with the majority being affected by the PNSRPF.

According to Peru's congressional subcommittee investigations, USAID, the United Nations Population Fund (UNFPA) and the Nippon Foundation supported the sterilization efforts of the Fujimori government. The investigation found that as USAID funding increased for the program, more sterilizations were performed, with the investigatory board concluding that the "correlation has a causal nature, since there is information made public recently, which has revealed the global strategy defined for the last quarter of the last century by the United States government in order to obtain a decrease in the birth rate". The subcommittee cited the National Security Study Memorandum 200 and Henry Kissinger's direction to lower population growth in developing countries in order to maintain stability for United States political and economic interests. In documents provided by the Freedom of Information Act, the investigators cited E. Liagin, who reported that from 1993 to 1998, "USAID's own internal files reveal that in 1993 the US basically took over Peru's national health system" during the period of forced sterilizations, with E. Liagin concluding that it was "virtually inconceivable that sterilization abuses could have occurred in the systematic way that has been documented without the knowledge of USAID local administrators and their counterparts in Washington".

In 1998 after facing pressure following investigations by the Population Research Institute, USAID ceased funding for sterilizations in Peru. Sterilizations continued until President Fujimori fled to Japan in 2000. Following USAID's withdrawal, Fujimori contacted the Nippon Foundation – whose directors hosted Fujimori when he fled to Japan – requesting assistance with sterilization programs. The policy of sterilizations resulted in a generational shift that included a smaller younger generation that could not provide economic stimulation to rural areas, making such regions more impoverished.

== See also ==
- Final Solution
- Forced sterilization in the United States
- Genocide of indigenous peoples
- Genocide of indigenous peoples in Brazil
