= 1993 Peruvian constitutional referendum =

31 October 1993
- Do you approve of the new Constitution approved by the Democratic Constituent Congress?

Results
Choice	Votes	%
Yes	3,895,763	52.33%
No	3,548,334	47.67%
Valid votes	7,444,097	91.02%
Invalid or blank votes	734,645	8.98%
Total votes	8,178,742	100.00%
Registered voters/turnout	11,620,820	70.38%
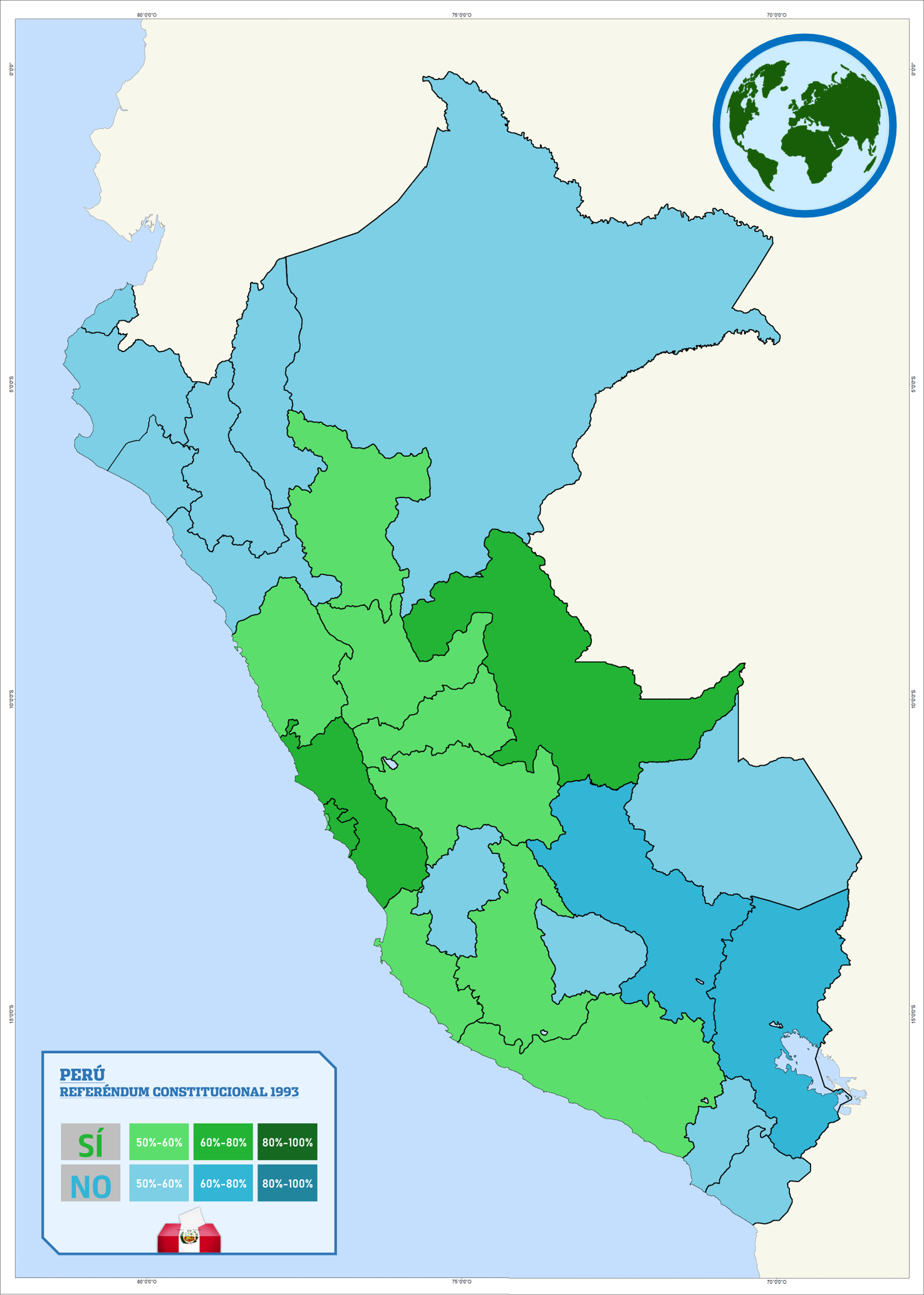
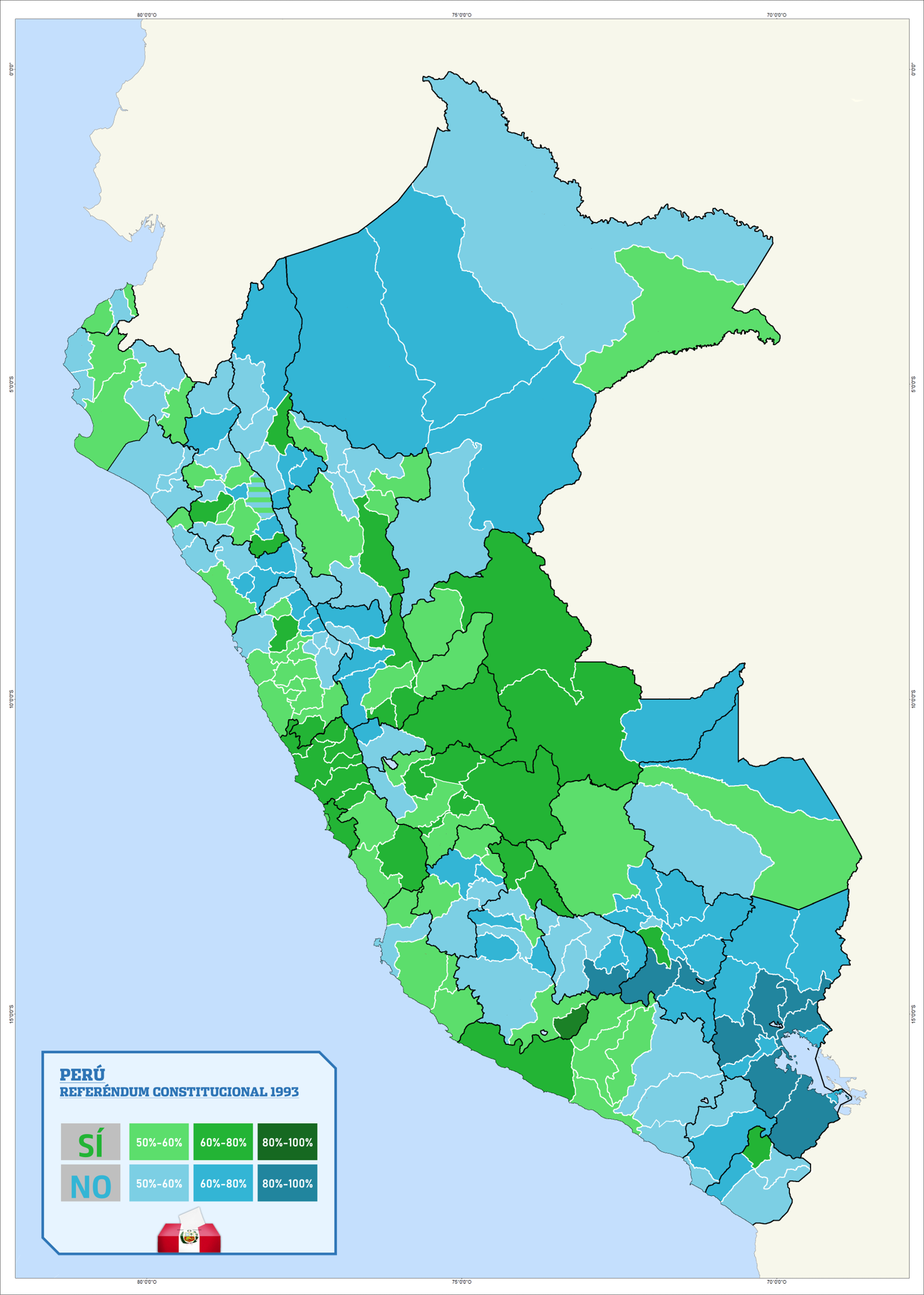
- Results by county

A constitutional referendum was held in Peru on 31 October 1993. It followed Alberto Fujimori's presidential coup on 5 April 1992. A new constitution was published on 4 September 1993, limiting the President to two terms of five years, creating a unicameral Congress. Constitutional amendments would be possible with either a referendum or a two-thirds majority in two successive Congresses. Referendums would also be possible if a petition had 0.3% of voters' signatures. After being approved by 52% of voters, the new constitution came into force on 29 December 1993.

== Results ==
Choice	Votes	%
For	3,895,763	52.33
Against	3,548,334	47.67
Total	7,444,097	100.00
Valid votes	7,444,097	91.02
Invalid/blank votes	734,645	8.98
Total votes	8,178,742	100.00
Registered voters/turnout	11,620,820	70.38
Source: Direct Democracy
