= Forced sterilization in Peru =

Peruvian forced sterilization campaign

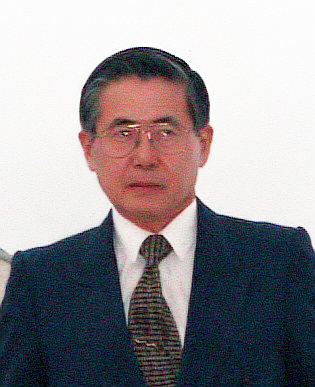
Under Alberto Fujimori's rule (1990–2000), 300,000 people were sterilised

Under the administration of President Alberto Fujimori, Peru implemented a forced sterilization campaign as part of the National Population Program, primarily targeting impoverished and Indigenous women in rural Andean regions. This effort, regarded as the largest state-sponsored sterilization initiative in the Americas, was publicly presented as a progressive strategy for promoting reproductive health and economic development. However, it has been broadly denounced for its coercive methods and associated human rights abuses.

The program, estimated to have sterilized some 300,000 mostly native women, drew on long-standing eugenic doctrines and neo-Malthusian theories, which linked excessive population growth to poverty and national instability. These concepts were encapsulated in Plan Verde, a military strategy conceived during the internal conflict in Peru (1980–2000). Under Fujimori, these ideas were transformed into a systematic policy purportedly designed to reduce poverty and high birth rates.

Women were frequently sterilized without informed consent, sometimes under pressure or in exchange for basic necessities such as food or healthcare. Medical personnel received monetary bonuses—typically ranging from four to ten dollars—for each sterilization they conducted, and promotions were tied to achieving specific targets. Failure to meet these quotas could negatively affect a health worker's career. Between 1996 and 2000, an estimated 300,000 sterilizations took place, disproportionately impacting Indigenous communities.

Numerous international and domestic organizations have condemned the campaign as a crime against humanity, with some categorizing it as ethnic cleansing or genocide. Efforts to prosecute those responsible have encountered legal and political barriers, resulting in limited accountability. In recent years, victims and advocacy groups have sought formal recognition and justice, though significant hurdles remain in obtaining comprehensive reparations and ensuring full responsibility for those involved.

== Background ==
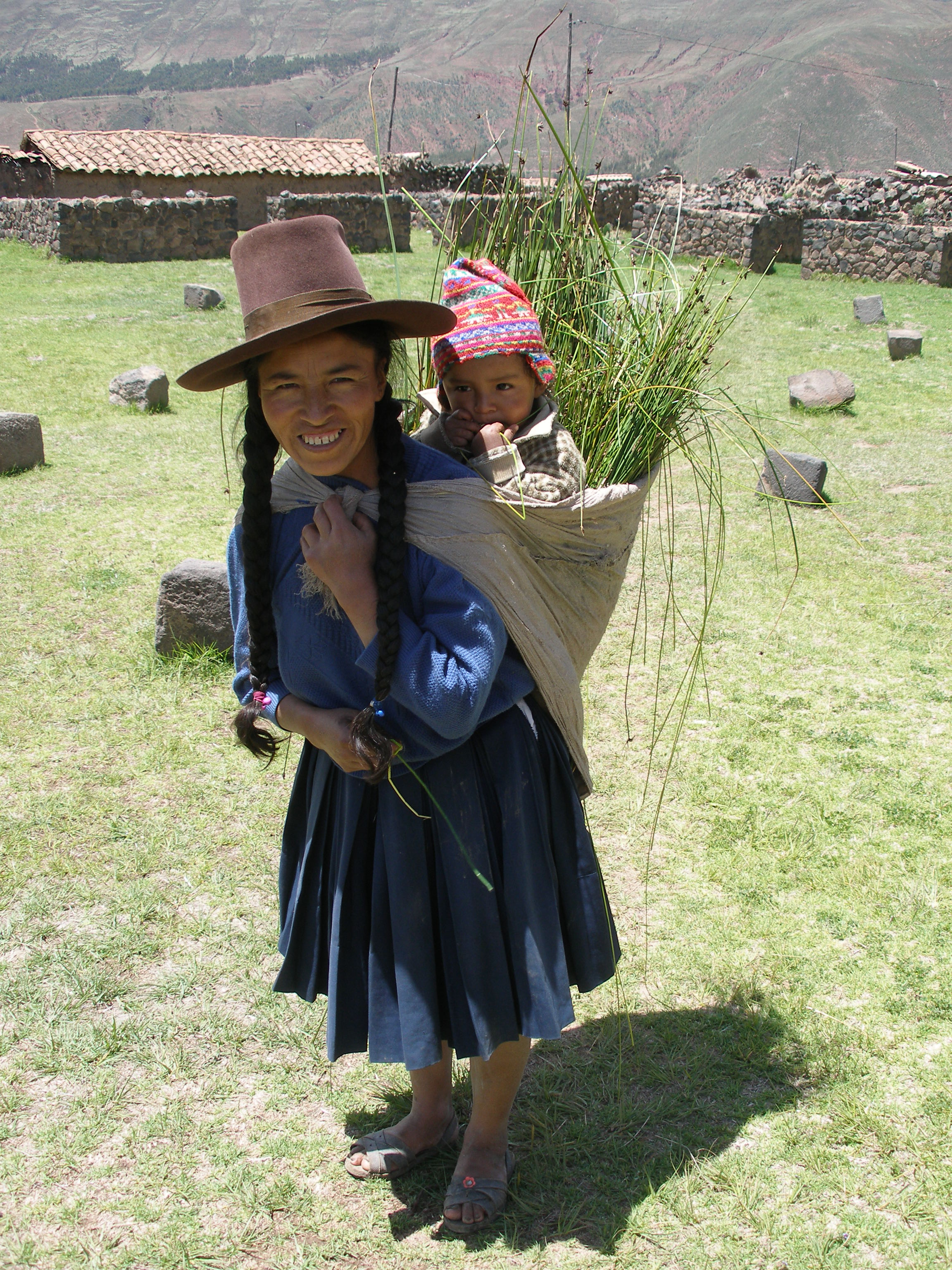
Andean woman with child

Radical eugenic measures, though previously proposed, were not enacted in Peru until the government of then-Peruvian President Alberto Fujimori (1990–2000). The systematic targeting of Indigenous women for sterilization, often without their informed consent during the Fujimori regime, affected peasant populations in the Peruvian highlands and reflected the belief that they were 'unfit' for reproduction according to the "imperatives of racial hygiene" and their perceived role as a barrier to national advancement.

=== Eugenics in Peru ===
In the 20th century, population control measures in Peru were closely tied to ethnicity. Public discourse on the so-called "Indian problem" portrayed Indigenous populations as obstacles to national progress while associating racial improvement with increased whiteness.

Eugenics, a theory that aims to improve the genetic quality of a human population, gained influence in Peru during the first half of the 20th century, reaching its apogee in the 1920s and 1930s. The government introduced pre-marriage examinations designed to prevent unions between individuals deemed "unfit".

Although concerns over population control persisted after the decline of the eugenics movement in the 1930s and 1940s, practices such as forced sterilization and eugenic abortion were not formally implemented during this period. However, there were also Peruvian authors who supported them, inspired by the policies applied in the United States and Nazi Germany. By the 1970s, after the atrocities of World War II, eugenics had largely fallen out of favor in both scientific and political discussions in Peru, becoming a taboo subject.

=== Demographic changes and population control ===
In post-colonial Peru, public health interventions primarily targeted marginalized groups, including women, the poor, and Indigenous populations. This focus led to a perception of the health system as catering mainly to these disadvantaged groups. Early pro-natalist policies in the republic emphasized mother-child health, viewing population growth as beneficial to the economy. Women were often seen in terms of their reproductive roles, with their contribution to economic progress tied to their potential as mothers and caregivers.

However, by the 1970s, large families were increasingly seen as "culturally primitive", harmful to women's health, and a threat to democratic stability. At that time, Peru was a deeply divided society, with a powerful oligarchy ruling over a largely impoverished majority. Rapid urbanization occurred, healthcare improved, and mortality rates declined, but the birth rate remained high—around six children per woman in 1972.

As the sexual revolution unfolded globally, calls for better access to birth control grew in Peru, particularly among middle-class urban women. Feminist movements advocated for reproductive health services, but access remained unequal, with middle-class women enjoying more resources compared to poor, rural, and predominantly Indigenous women.

Following the collapse of the military regime in the 1980s, the government of Fernando Belaúnde (1980–1985) made the first attempts to expand access to birth control. The 1981 census indicated that women in regions with high birth rates did not desire more children. In response, the government created a national population council and introduced family planning services in hospitals, though these efforts were largely confined to urban areas and did not reach rural Indigenous populations.

These efforts were continued by President Alan García (1985–1990), with support from both the political left and the Catholic Church. However, while the Church endorsed population control, it opposed modern contraceptive methods, promoting instead "responsible parenthood" through traditional means. Due to the Church's influence, the 1985 National Law on Population did not legalize voluntary sterilization or abortion, a decision that disappointed many feminist activists.

== Plan Verde and National Population Program ==
=== Elaboration of Plan Verde ===
In the 1980s, the Peruvian Armed Forces grew increasingly frustrated with President Alan García's inability to address the country's political crises, including the armed conflict. In response, the military began drafting a plan to overthrow his government and implement a neoliberal economic system under an authoritarian regime. The military saw overpopulation of ethnic Others as a possible cause of social problems, as in neo-Malthusian theory, and shaped this thought into Plan Verde.

Business elites, who maintained close relations with military planners, supported this agenda, providing economic ideas that aligned with the military's goals. One key aspect of this plan, detailed in a volume titled Driving Peru into the 21st Century (Spanish: Impulsar al Perú al siglo XXI), involved a population control strategy aimed at impoverished citizens. According to extracts from Plan Verde, the authors expressed concern over what they termed "epidemic" demographic trends. They argued that the growing population would strain resources such as food, education, and housing by increasing demand by approximately 500,000 people each year.

The plan advocated halting demographic growth through the "widespread use of sterilization" among groups described as "culturally backward" and "economically impoverished". It proposed making tubal ligation the standard procedure at health centers, urging compulsory methods "on an experimental basis" and calling for discrimination against "surplus population", which were deemed detrimental to Peru's progress. Peruvian analyst Fernando Rospigliosi likened these ideas to those of the Nazis, noting the extreme language used in the plan, including references to the "total extermination" of certain populations due to their perceived incorrigibility and lack of resources.

Recognizing the growing influence of Vladimiro Montesinos – Fujimori's advisor and future head of the National Intelligence Service (SIN) – senior military commanders transferred the Plan Verde to him. Rospigliosi suggested that an agreement was reached between Fujimori, his intelligence chief Montesinos, and key military officers involved in Plan Verde prior to Fujimori's inauguration. As a result, many of the policies outlined in Plan Verde were later adopted during Fujimori's administration.

=== Implementation of sterilization policies ===
We were required to perform a certain number of sterilizations each month. This was obligatory and if we did not comply, we were fired. Many providers did not inform women that they were going to be sterilized – they told them that the procedure was something else. But I felt this was wrong. I preferred to offer women a bag of rice to convince them to accept the procedure and explained to them beforehand what was going to happen.

— Ministry of Health physician

In the 1990s, the government of Alberto Fujimori implemented a state-led sterilization program as part of broader population control efforts under the National Population Program. This initiative, framed as a tool for economic development, disproportionately targeted impoverished and Indigenous women, particularly in rural areas. A media controversy orchestrated by Fujimori during his first term (1990–1995) created a conducive environment for his future sterilisation campaign.

The sterilization campaign stemmed from earlier military plans, including Plan Verde, which advocated for population control measures to alleviate economic burdens. By 1991, Fujimori's administration had integrated these ideas into its policies. In 1992, following Fujimori's self-coup, a civilian-military regime was established, and many of the objectives outlined in Plan Verde were set into motion. The Peruvian Armed Forces provided medical materials and logistics to assist with implementing sterilizations in a systematic manner. Armed troops were observed at some locations where mass sterilizations occurred and doctors of the armed forces sterilized thousands of individuals.

The Family Planning Program (1991–1998) was initially supported by national and international organizations due to the historical neglect of comprehensive reproductive health policies in Peru. The program was presented using progressive rhetoric, with Fujimori framing population control as essential for modernization and economic growth. He criticized the Catholic Church, which opposed the use of modern contraceptive methods, as an obstacle to family planning efforts. Notably, many of the rural areas targeted by the program were not overpopulated, but were located in inaccessible, poor and marginalized areas.

In 1993, the government advocated for such a program, citing the need for population control to ensure the provision of basic social services. Reports from the Presidency and the Prime Minister's Office influenced the direction of the sterilization campaign, emphasizing sterilization for the poor as a critical element of economic recovery. The program director, Eduardo Yong Motta, demanded increased quotas for sterilizations, and Fujimori, known for his micromanagement, personally pressured regional leaders to comply.

Before the program's expansion, fewer than 15,000 sterilizations were performed annually, primarily for women with specific health risks or those with multiple children. However, after 1995, sterilizations were increasingly performed on people without prior medical conditions, targeting women from poor and marginalized communities. By 1996, the number of sterilizations had increased to 67,000, and by 1997, it reached 115,000.

Between 1996 and 2000, an estimated 300,000 Peruvians were sterilized, the vast majority of whom were Indigenous, poor, and illiterate women. (Note: Official government data indicates that a total of 260,874 sterilisations and 21,494 vasectomies were performed under the National Reproductive Health and Family Planning Programme (NRHFP) between 1996 and 2000. However, several sources estimate that the actual number of sterilisations may have exceeded 300,000.) The program's use of intimidation and coercion led to severe medical complications for many women, social ostracism, and in some cases, death. Fujimori's government used feminist discourse to legitimize the campaign, framing it as a progressive step toward women's empowerment and family planning, even as human rights violations occurred.

=== Methods of coercion ===
During the implementation of sterilization programs in Peru, numerous procedures were performed under coercive circumstances. Indigenous women often faced pressure when seeking basic healthcare, such as treatment for minor ailments, vaccinations, or routine check-ups. In some instances, individuals who visited clinics for conditions like the flu were anesthetized and sterilized without their consent. Cesarean sections were also used as opportunities to carry out sterilizations without informed consent, and healthcare workers sometimes offered food incentives—such as bags of rice—to persuade women to undergo the procedure. In one reported incident in Cangallo District, a midwife told a researcher that their clinic held a "Tubal Ligation Fair" that resulted in 147 women sterilized in two days, that surgeries continued with women screaming in pain due to weakened anesthesia and that those in waiting rooms who heard the shouting were locked in the facility to be later sterilized.

By 1998, approximately 8% of the Peruvian population was illiterate, with higher rates in rural and Indigenous regions that experienced the brunt of these campaigns. Economic incentives, including food or clothing, were commonly offered to persuade women living in poverty to accept sterilization. Many of those targeted did not speak Spanish fluently or were illiterate, making them particularly vulnerable. Under these conditions, some women were asked to sign or place their fingerprints on consent forms they could not understand, and refusal often led to threats of losing access to food programs. Moreover, many healthcare workers lacked adequate training, and the facilities used were frequently outdated or poorly equipped. Counseling services were minimal, leaving women unaware of the procedure's risks and implications.

Additional forms of coercion included threats involving police intervention, denial of healthcare services, and, in extreme cases, threats of imprisonment. These tactics were employed to pressure women into accepting sterilization without fully understanding its consequences or providing genuine consent. In certain areas, Shining Path guerrillas reportedly protected some Indigenous communities from the forced sterilization efforts carried out by Ministry of Health brigades.

== Analysis ==
=== Ethnic cleansing and genocide ===
Forced sterilization in Peru, carried out under the National Population Program, has been analyzed by numerous scholars and organizations as a form of systemic violence against Indigenous and rural women. The sterilization practices, which occurred predominantly during 1996, were labeled as genocide and, in some instances, compared to ethnic cleansing. Scholars such as Michele Back and Virginia Zavala emphasize that the program's focus on marginalized groups, particularly Indigenous communities, aligns with the characteristics of ethnic cleansing due to its targeted nature.

Jocelyn E. Getgen from Cornell University argues that the systemic implementation of these sterilizations, combined with the documented intent of officials associated with Plan Verde—a military strategy devised during the internal conflict—meets the criteria for genocide. The Amazonian Center of Anthropology and Practical Application has characterized the sterilization campaign as an act of genocide unparalleled since the colonization of Peru.

The policy's long-term effects included a significant demographic impact, particularly a reduction in the younger generation. This generational decline contributed to the economic stagnation of rural areas, which became increasingly impoverished without a sufficient labor force to support agricultural and economic development.

Alejandra Ballón Gutiérrez, a Peruvian researcher, asserts that forced sterilization served as "a weapon of war and an instrument of torture" aimed at Indigenous women. The military, operating under counterinsurgency objectives during the civil conflict, viewed rural populations as potential supporters of insurgent groups. Consequently, the sterilizations were part of a broader strategy to suppress perceived insurgent threats by reducing the birth rates of communities deemed subversive or destabilizing.

=== Official figures ===
Under Pedro Pablo Kuczynski's administration, the Registry of Victims of Forced Sterilizations (Reviesfo) within the Peruvian Ministry of Justice was created in 2016. While not all sterilized persons can be registered with Reviesfo due to procedural problems, this agency was able to identify at least 8,000 women who underwent sterilization against their will. Therefore, the actual number is estimated to be higher.

=== Foreign involvement ===
According to Peru's congressional subcommittee investigations, United States Agency for International Development (USAID), the United Nations Population Fund (UNFPA), and the Nippon Foundation supported the sterilization efforts of the Fujimori government.

==== USAID ====
For three decades, United States Agency for International Development (USAID) has been the principal foreign donor to family planning in Peru. Until the 1990s, the Peruvian government's commitment to providing family planning services was limited. In 1998, concerns arose regarding the involvement of the USAID in forced sterilization campaigns in Peru. Some far-right politicians in Washington opposed USAID's funding of family planning initiatives in the country. In January 1998, David Morrison, from the U.S.-based NGO Population Research Institute (PRI), traveled to Peru to investigate claims of human rights abuses related to these programs. During his visit, Morrison gathered testimony from Peruvian politicians and other figures opposed to family planning but did not meet with USAID officials in Peru. Upon his return to the United States, the PRI submitted its findings to U.S. Congressman Chris Smith, a member of the Republican Party, urging for the suspension of USAID's family planning efforts in Peru. Smith subsequently dispatched a member of his staff to Peru for further investigation.

In February 1998, a far-right U.S. organization, the Latin American Alliance for the Family, sent its director to Peru to examine the situation, again without consulting USAID officials. On February 25, 1998, a subcommittee of the U.S. House Committee on International Relations, chaired by Smith, held a hearing on "the Peruvian population control program". Allegations that USAID was funding forced sterilizations in Peru prompted Congressman Todd Tiahrt to introduce the "Tiahrt Amendment" in 1998. However, the subcommittee concluded that USAID's funding had not supported the abuses committed by the Peruvian government.

Grover J. Rees III, who was the subcommittee's chief counsel, did acknowledge that some funding for food programs from the United States may have been used to coerce women to become sterilized.

== Aftermath ==
=== Investigations ===
Efforts to address the forced sterilizations have been pursued by both civil society and the government. The Truth and Reconciliation Commission (TRC) was established in 2001 to investigate two decades of armed conflict between the Shining Path and the Peruvian military. Its final report, published in 2003, concluded that Andean Indigenous peoples were the most affected by the armed conflict. The Commission was criticized, however, for not investigating the forced sterilization campaign, instead focusing on incidents of rape that occurred during the conflict and deciding that this the only crime eligible for reparations from the state.

Human rights groups criticized the government for limiting the scope of sexual violence reparations. Decree 2906 was then introduced to expand the definition of sexual violence during the conflict to include practices such as forced pregnancy, abortion, prostitution, and sexual slavery, faced strong opposition from the Ministry of Justice. The Ministry argued that this broadened definition would implicate the state, particularly the Ministry of Health, as the primary perpetrator of sexual violence during the war. While Decree 2906 was eventually passed in 2012, it excluded the sterilization campaign from the expanded definition of reparable sexual violence.

==== Peruvian Catholic Church and NGOs ====
The Peruvian Catholic Church and human rights organizations played an important role in denouncing forced sterilizations during the Fujimori regime. Catholic leaders were among the earliest to condemn the sterilization campaign, even before feminist and other activist groups. However, their motivations differed from those of human rights organizations. The Church's opposition was framed by a conservative agenda, yet it adopted elements of human rights and public health frameworks to strengthen its stance against family planning. A strong metaphor used by Catholic leaders to describe the sterilizations was the "mutilation of the poor".

In their critique, the Catholic Church argued that the family planning campaign infringed upon individual freedom, particularly women's rights, and violated the public's autonomy. This position was often articulated through the defense of women's "right to motherhood". The Church's opposition gained international attention through media statements that emphasized concerns about violations of personal freedoms.

Feminist organizations, such as the NGO Flora Tristán, in contrast, contributed to the discourse with reports on the government's sterilization practices. Giulia Tamayo, herself one of Flora Tristán's key figures, published a detailed report on the Fujimori government's "Health Festivals", (Spanish: festivales de salud) where mass sterilizations took place. According to Tamayo's findings, only 10% of the 314,967 women sterilized gave their free, prior and informed consent.

Reports by Flora Tristán also revealed that health professionals were incentivized with bonuses ranging from US$4 to $10 for each woman they "persuaded" and sterilized, and promotions were given based on meeting sterilization quotas. Professionals who did not meet these targets could lose their career advancement.

=== Denial ===
Publicly, the Fujimori administration and Fujimorists denied the existence of a forced sterilization program, attributing the allegations to an "international conspiracy" and accusing local critics of disregarding the health needs of the poor. In a speech at the United Nations General Assembly, President Alberto Fujimori mocked the human rights organizations that condemned the sterilizations, suggesting that their discontent stemmed from not receiving state funding. This narrative was echoed by numerous Peruvian and international institutions aligned with Fujimori's government.

During this period, the Fujimori regime systematically distanced itself from independent institutions, including the media, judiciary, and Congress. Opposition to government policies was often labeled as "anti-nationalist", disruptive to political stability, or even linked to terrorism. Despite this atmosphere of repression, feminist groups, journalists, non-governmental organizations (NGOs), and human rights activists amplified the voices of affected women.

The concept of informed consent, or respecting the reproductive choices of women, was largely limited to middle-class, educated, urban, and predominantly white individuals. In contrast, the Fujimori government fostered a climate of fear, marked by ongoing concerns about terrorism and economic instability, which silenced many voices and created tacit support for the regime among broader segments of Peruvian society.

Fujimori was succeeded by Alejandro Toledo in 2001. While the Toledo administration condemned the practice of forced sterilizations, it also faced criticism for other reproductive rights violations. The Peruvian Medical Association acknowledged that the sterilization procedures were state policy and violated patients' rights, but defended doctors, arguing that they were pressured by the state and forced to perform sterilizations without consent under the threat of losing their jobs. This stance was criticized for portraying medical professionals as victims of the system, thereby minimizing their personal and professional accountability for the violations.

=== Legal ===
Forced sterilization in Peru under the administration of former President Alberto Fujimori has been widely condemned by international organizations. The Rome Statute of the International Criminal Court, which defines the legal parameters of international crimes, classifies forced sterilization as a crime against humanity. In 1999, the Inter-American Commission on Human Rights received a case concerning Mamerita Mestanza Chavez, who was coerced into undergoing sterilization without adequate medical care, ultimately resulting in her death. Observers have criticized the Peruvian government for its limited action in addressing these allegations and for hampering investigations—particularly during times when Fujimorist influence in Congress was significant.

In 2016, a Peruvian public prosecutor concluded that Fujimori and his administration should not face prosecution, suggesting that any coercive sterilizations stemmed from isolated misconduct by individual medical personnel. Despite this stance, a legal case representing thousands of affected women—initiated in 2002—proceeded through a protracted process. Fujimori, already convicted for other human rights violations, was initially set to stand trial for the sterilization program. However, Judge Rafael Martinez ruled that forced sterilizations were not encompassed in Chile's original extradition request when Fujimori was transferred to Peru. This decision was later overturned in 2024, when Justice Andrea Muñoz Sánchez of the Supreme Court of Chile approved including forced sterilization charges in the extradition framework, allowing the prosecution to advance.

In 2023, the Inter-American Commission on Human Rights accepted the case of Edith Ramos, a victim of the forced sterilization program, for a new hearing before the Inter-American Court of Human Rights (IACHR). Subsequently, in October 2024, the United Nations Committee on the Elimination of Discrimination against Women issued a landmark ruling declaring that Peru's policy of forced sterilizations in the 1990s could constitute a crime against humanity. The Committee also concluded that the Peruvian state's failure to conduct thorough investigations or provide reparations to survivors amounted to discrimination against women. In March 2026, the IACHR ruled the Peruvian state responsible for Ramos' death and ordered it to pay $340,000 in compensation to her heirs.

== See also ==
- Demographics of Peru
- Racism in Peru
