= Decree Law 25418 =

Decree Law 25418 is a highly controversial Peruvian law decreed in April 1992 by then-President Alberto Fujimori. The decree essentially provided the legal trappings for the coup d'état of April 5, 1992.

The decree renamed the government, dissolved the Congress, gave the Executive Branch all legislative powers, suspended much of the Constitution, and gave the president the power to enact various reforms, such as the "application of drastic punishments" towards terrorists and the "moralization" of the Judicial Branch.

Although Decree Law 25418 was patently unconstitutional, its last article read "the articles of the Political Constitution and the legal norms that oppose this Decree Law are suspended," giving the decree theoretical supremacy over the Constitution. The Peruvian Congress rejected this claim and swore Máximo San Román, Fujimori's vice president, into the presidency, but San Roman did not gain control over the state apparatus and was never the de facto president.
