= Brčko bridge massacre =

1992 massacre during the Bosnian War

- Part of Bosnian War
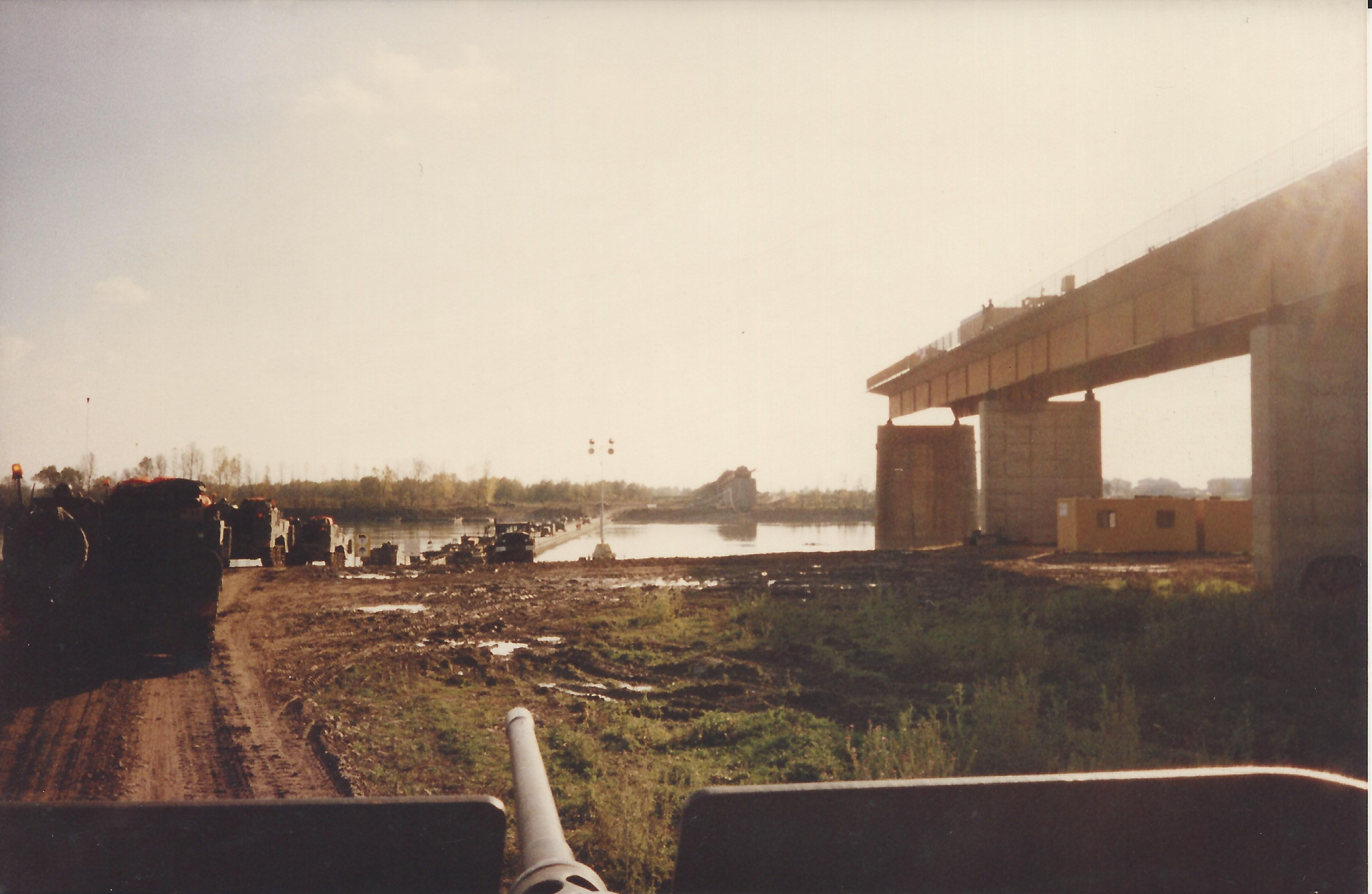
- U.S. Army vehicles with IFOR crossing the Sava using a pontoon bridge in 1996. The Brčko Bridge, destroyed in the massacre, can be seen at the right.
- Location: 44°52′56″N 18°48′43″E; Brčko, Bosnia and Herzegovina
- Date: 30 April 1992
- Target: Bosniaks; Croats
- Attack type: Mass killing
- Deaths: ~100
- Perpetrators: Serb Volunteer Guard; White Eagles

The Brčko bridge massacre was a massacre of approximately 100 civilians of Croat and Bosniak nationalities that took place during the morning of 30 April 1992, during the Bosnian War.

The bridge, a border crossing spanning the Sava river, was deliberately blown up by Bosnian Serb forces while the civilians were crossing it. Many of the victims were refugees trying to flee from the village of Gunja in Croatia to the city of Brčko in Bosnia, while others were workers crossing from Croatia to Brčko to celebrate the Labour Day weekend. It is difficult to ascertain how many people died in the massacre because some of the bodies were swept away by the river. The victims also came from all over Bosnia, which complicated identification efforts.

No one was held responsible for the massacre, although some sources claim that the perpetrators may have been members of the White Eagles and Arkan's Tigers paramilitaries.

In 1996, the government of Croatia reopened the Brčko bridge to civilian traffic. The United States NATO forces turned over control of the bridge to the Bosnian Serb police in 1997.
