= 1992 Peruvian self-coup =

Peruvian political crisis

Fujimorazo
- Part of the Internal conflict in Peru
Date	5 April 1992
Location	Peru
Action	Self-coup: President Fujimori announces he is "temporarily dissolving" Congress and "reorganizing" the Judicial Branch.; Fujimori orders the Army to drive a tank to the steps of Congress.
Result	Presidential victory: Implementation of Plan Verde.; Curtailing of the independence of the judiciary and constitutional rights.; Forced sterilization of an estimated 300,000 people.; Neoliberal economic policy applied in Peru.; Boycotted elections are held in November 1992 to draft a new constitution.; New Constitution is enacted in 1993.

Belligerents
Government of Peru; Joint Command; Armed Forces; Peruvian Army; Peruvian Navy; Peruvian Air Force; Cambio 90; Pro-Fujimori protesters	Congress; Judiciary: (Peru) Opposition; Aprista Party; Popular Action; Christian People's Party; (Peru) Anti-Fujimori protesters

Commanders and leaders
Alberto Fujimori; Víctor Malca Villanueva; (Peru) Vladimiro Montesinos; Nicolás de Bari Hermoza Ríos	Felipe Osterling; Roberto Ramírez del Villar Beaumont; (Peru) Máximo San Román; (Peru) Alan García; (Peru) Isaac Humala

Military support
Thousands of soldiers Tanks; Armored personnel carriers	None
- On November 26, 2007, ten former government officials were sentenced by the Supreme Court of Peru for their role in the self-coup.

The 1992 Peruvian self-coup, sometimes known as the Fujimorazo, was performed in Peru in 1992 after President Alberto Fujimori dissolved the Congress as well as the judiciary and assumed full legislative and judicial powers. With the collaboration of the military, the Fujimori government arrested prominent opposition leaders and journalists, as well as seized government buildings.

Following the coup, the Fujimori government subsequently began to implement objectives of the Green Plan. Most Peruvian politicians, intellectuals and journalists criticized the coup, while security forces, most of the private business sector and a substantial part of the public supported Fujimori.

The coup ended Peru's democratic system which had been in place since the end of military rule in 1980. Peru's abandonment of democracy was largely supported by the public due to existing disenchantment with the actions of previous political institutions. The coup occurred in the context of an economic crisis, political gridlock, organized crime, and terrorism from the Shining Path.

== Background ==
Under the military government of Juan Velasco Alvarado, Peru's foreign debt increased greatly especially in the face of international shocks such as the 1970s energy crisis. Problems and relative isolation continued with the economic policy of President Alan García, criticised by some opponents as ‘further isolating the economy’ and leading to lower foreign investment. Under García, Peru experienced hyperinflation and increased confrontations with the guerrilla group Shining Path, leading the country towards high levels of instability.

=== Plan Verde ===
In October 1989, Plan Verde, a clandestine military operation, was developed by the armed forces of Peru during the internal conflict in Peru; it involved the genocide of impoverished and indigenous Peruvians, the control or censorship of media in the nation and the establishment of a neoliberal economy in Peru. Initially a coup d'état was included in the plan, though this was opposed by Anthony C. E. Quainton, the United States Ambassador to Peru. Military planners also decided against the coup as they expected a neoliberal candidate to be elected in the 1990 Peruvian general election. Rendón writes that the United States supported Fujimori because of his relationship with Vladimiro Montesinos, a former Peruvian intelligence officer who was charged with spying on the Peruvian military for the Central Intelligence Agency. Summarizing alleged support for Fujimori's candidacy from the United States, Rendón writes, "If Vargas Llosa with liberal democracy was very polarizing and a danger to American interests in the region, Fujimori with authoritarianism was very consensual and more in line with American interests in Peru and the region".

According to Peruvian sociologist and political analyst Fernando Rospigliosi, Peru's business elites held relationships with the military planners, with Rospigliosi writing that businesses "probably provided the economic ideas which [the military] agreed with, the necessity of a liberal economic program as well as the installment of an authoritarian government which would impose order". Rospigliosi also states that "an understanding was established between Fujimori, Montesinos and some of the military officers" involved in Plan Verde prior to Fujimori's inauguration. After taking office, Fujimori abandoned the economic platform he promoted during his electoral campaign, adopting more aggressive neoliberal policies than those espoused by his competitor in the election. Fujimori would go on to adopt many of the policies outlined in Plan Verde. With the compliance of Fujimori, plans for a coup as designed in Plan Verde were prepared over a two-year period prior to April 1992.

=== Neoliberal economic proposals ===
Hernando de Soto – who with the assistance and funding of the Atlas Network created the Institute for Liberty and Democracy (ILD), one of the first neoliberal organizations in Latin America – served informally as Fujimori's "personal representative" for the first three years of his government and recommended a "shock" to Peru's economy, stating "This society is collapsing, without a doubt, ... But the problems here are so entrenched that you have to have a collapse before you can implement fundamental changes in the political system". De Soto convinced Fujimori to travel to New York City in a meeting organized by the Peruvian Javier Pérez de Cuéllar, secretary general of the United Nations, where they met with the heads of the International Monetary Fund, the World Bank, and the Inter-American Development Bank, who convinced Fujimori to follow the guidelines for economic policy set by the international financial institutions. The policies included a 300 percent tax increase, unregulated prices and privatizing two-hundred and fifty state-owned entities.

=== Congressional disputes ===
Through Fujimori's first two years in office, congress – which consisted mainly of opposition parties – granted Fujimori legislative power on fifteen separate occasions, which allowed him to enact 158 laws. However, congress resisted Fujimori's efforts to adopt policies advocated by the International Monetary Fund and World Bank, especially austerity measures.

In response, Fujimori mounted a self-coup (Spanish: autogolpe, sometimes Fuji-coup or fujigolpe) on Sunday, April 5, 1992.

== Self-coup ==
On the night of Sunday April 5, 1992, Fujimori appeared on television and announced that he was "temporarily dissolving" the Congress of the Republic and "reorganizing" the Judicial Branch of the government. He then ordered the Peruvian Army to drive a tank to the steps of Congress to shut it down. When a group of senators attempted to hold session, tear gas was deployed against them.

That same night, the military was sent to detain prominent members of the political opposition. Fujimori was convicted in 2009 for the kidnapping of journalist Gustavo Gorriti and businessman Samuel Dyer, both of whom were detained by the military on the night of the self coup.

One of the most criticized moves that Fujimori took was the attempt to arrest former president Alan García, in order to have him face numerous trials. Also contributing to the coup was Fujimori's desire to remove García, who was serving as a Senator, as a political rival and potential future presidential candidate. However, García managed to escape arrest and sought political asylum in Colombia.

== Results ==
Fujimori issued Decree Law 25418, which dissolved the Congress, gave the Executive Branch all legislative powers, suspended much of the Constitution, and gave the president the power to enact various reforms, such as the "application of drastic punishments" towards "terrorists". Fujimori called for elections of a new congress that was later named the Democratic Constitutional Congress (Congreso Constituyente Democrático); Fujimori later received a majority in this new congress, which later drafted the 1993 Constitution. Fujimori also set about curtailing the independence of the judiciary and constitutional rights with a declaration of a state of emergency and curfews, as well as enacting controversial "severe emergency laws" to deal with terrorism.

The Prime Minister, Alfonso de Los Heros, and the Minister of Agriculture resigned while the rest of ministers supported the de facto government. Máximo San Román, then the first vice president of the republic, did not support the coup. He was not in the country at the time of the coup, and he was not informed about this move.

The legislative branch responded by activating the constitutional clauses that allow the Congress to remove the president from office. Fujimori was removed and Máximo San Román was formally sworn into the presidency. Prominent politicians supported this move: former President Fernando Belaúnde Terry and most of the Acción Popular Party supported San Román, while former FREDEMO presidential candidate Mario Vargas Llosa called for a civil insurgency to overthrow Fujimori. However, neither the military nor the big majority of the people ever supported San Román, and he never became the de facto president.

== Reactions ==
=== Domestic ===
Following the coup, Peruvian newspapers, radio and television stations were occupied by the military beginning at 10:30 pm on 5 April and remained for forty hours until 7 April, limiting initial response from domestic media. During the period, only the Fujimori government was granted to communicate with the public and all newspapers were printed under military observation and contained similar content; every publication was ordered to not include the word "coup".

The only poll allowed to be published following the coup was presented by APOYO Opinión y Mercado, with Rendón writing that the Fujimori government "had the information monopoly and the company APOYO the monopoly of measuring the effects of this information monopoly on the citizenry". The APOYO poll stated that of respondents, 71% supported the dissolution of congress and 89% supported the restructuring of the judiciary, with the government and media promptly promoting the results to the public. David Wood of the University of Sheffield described the poll as an example of "semantic shepherding" while Rendón wrote that "APOYO was dedicated to doing the surveys that the regime would use in its favor, to legitimize itself politically". In the years after releasing the poll, director of APOYO Felipe Ortiz de Zevallos would continue to defend Fujimori and would be involved with his government's programs.

According to of Manuel D'Ornellas of Expreso in 1994, the military's oversight of the media was only momentary due to international condemnation Fujimori received. Another group of military officers led by General Jaime Salinas Sedó attempted to overthrow Fujimori on 13 November.

=== International ===
International reactions to the self-coup were different: International financial organizations delayed planned or projected loans, and the United States government suspended all aid to Peru other than humanitarian assistance, as did Germany and Spain. Venezuela broke off diplomatic relations, and Argentina withdrew its ambassador. Chile joined Argentina in requesting that Peru be suspended from the Organization of American States. The coup appeared to threaten the economic recovery strategy of reinsertion, and complicated the process of clearing arrears with the International Monetary Fund.

Even before the coup, relations with the United States had been strained because of Fujimori's reluctance to sign an accord that would increase U.S. and Peruvian military efforts in eradicating coca fields. Although Fujimori eventually signed the accord in May 1991, in order to get desperately needed aid, the disagreements did little to enhance bilateral relations. The Peruvians saw drugs as primarily a U.S. problem and the least of their concerns, given the economic crisis, Shining Path (Sendero Luminoso, or S.L.) guerrillas, and an outbreak of cholera, which further isolated Peru because of a resulting ban on food imports.

However, two weeks after the self-coup, the Bush administration changed their position and officially recognized Fujimori as the legitimate leader of Peru. The Organization of American States and the U.S. agreed that Fujimori's coup may have been extreme, but they did not want to see Peru return to the deteriorating state that it had been in before. In fact, the coup came not long after the U.S. government and media had launched a media offensive against the Shining Path rural guerrilla movement. On March 12, 1992, Undersecretary of State for Latin American Affairs Bernard Aronson told the US Congress: "The international community and respected human rights organizations must focus the spotlight of world attention on the threat which Sendero poses... Latin America has seen violence and terror, but none like Sendero's... and make no mistake, if Sendero were to take power, we would see... genocide." Given Washington's concerns, long-term repercussions of the self-coup turned out to be modest.

== Punishment of those responsible ==
On November 26, 2007, ten former government officials were sentenced by the Supreme Court of Peru for their role in the coup. Fujimori's Minister of the Interior, Juan Briones Dávila, was sentenced to ten years imprisonment. Former Fujimorist congressmen Jaime Yoshiyama, Carlos Boloña, Absalón Vásquez, Víctor Joy Way, Óscar de la Puente Raygada, Jaime Sobero, Alfredo Ross Antezana, Víctor Paredes Guerra, and Augusto Antoniolli Vásquez were all also sentenced for various crimes such as rebellion and kidnapping.

== See also ==
- Martial Law under Ferdinand Marcos
- Plan Verde
