= Caiga quien caiga (film) =

- Theatrical release poster
- Directed by: Eduardo Guillot
- Written by: Alejandro Maci
- Based on: Caiga quien caiga by José Ugaz
- Produced by: Eduardo Guillot; Cielo Garrido
- Starring: Miguel Iza
- Cinematography: César Fe
- Edited by: Roberto Benavides
- Production companies: Imagia Films; Amaranta Films
- Distributed by: Amaranta Films
- Release date: August 23, 2018
- Running time: 105 minutes
- Country: Peru
- Language: Spanish

Caiga quien caiga (lit. 'Whoever that fails') is a 2018 Peruvian political thriller film, based on the homonymous book written by José Ugaz. The film was directed and produced by Eduardo Guillot Meave, and starred Miguel Iza as Vladimiro Montesinos.

== Plot ==
In September 2000, the first vladivideo was revealed, a recording in which the presidential adviser Vladimiro Montesinos bribed Alberto Kouri, an opposition congressman, to vote for favor of the government. After that, the government of Alberto Fujimori faces a crisis that would lead to its end; likewise, the presidential adviser is accused of corruption and persecuted by the dying Fujimori regime.

Vladimiro Montesinos flees to Panama where he is unable to obtain political asylum, so he returns to Peru. Justice issues an arrest warrant against him and the president Alberto Fujimori is part of police operations to search for him. However, Montesinos manages to escape on the sailboat Karisma to Costa Rica and then to Venezuela.

== Cast ==
- Miguel Iza as Vladimiro Montesinos
- Eduardo Camino as José Ugaz
- Javier Valdés as Alberto Bermúdez (Alberto Bustamante Belaúnde)
- Karina Jordán as Marina
- Kukuli Morante as Jacqueline Beltrán
- Jackie Vásquez as Matilde Pinchi Pinchi
- José Miguel Arbulú as Bologna
- Gonzalo Molina as Saul
- Alfonso Dibos as Eduardo
- Milene Vásquez as Verónica (José Ugaz's ex-wife)
- Sandro Calderon as Huaman
- Diego Carlos Seyfarth as Walter Thomas
- Marcello Rivera as Vera
- Alejandra Guerra as Laura Bozzo.
- Victor Prada
- Ana Maria Estrada
- Pietro Sibille as Vatican
- Claudio Calmet
- Percy Williams Silva

== Production ==
The film premiered on August 23, 2018, with Cielo Garrido as executive producer, achieving second place in a thriller on the day of its premiere, exceeding 100,000 viewers the week of its premiere.

== Reception ==
=== Reviews ===
The film has received mixed reviews from the specialized press, they call it very bland and boring, also that in its footage they show three sex scenes that are only fanservice and do not help the story they are trying to tell, also having poor performances and only one being saved, that of Miguel Iza as Vladimiro Montesinos.

=== Disputes ===
In the first days of August 2018, Vladimiro Montesinos sent a notarized letter stating that the film "affects his good image." In the same way, the presenter Laura Bozzo was against the premiere of the film and announced legal measures for the use of her image and the phrase "Let the Wretch pass!".

=== Awards ===
- National Competition for Feature Film Distribution Projects 2018 (Ministry of Culture).
