= Carlos Boloña =

Peruvian economist and politician (1950–2018)

Minister of Economy and Finance
- In office 28 July 2000 – 21 November 2000
- President: Alberto Fujimori
- Prime Minister: Federico Salas
- Preceded by: Efraín Goldenberg
- Succeeded by: Javier Silva Ruete
- In office 15 February 1991 – 8 January 1993
- President: Alberto Fujimori
- Prime Minister: Carlos Torres y Torres Lara; Alfonso de los Heros; Óscar de la Puente Raygada
- Preceded by: Juan Carlos Hurtado Miller
- Succeeded by: Jorge Camet Dickman

Personal details
- Born: Carlos Alberto Boloña Behr; 27 July 1950 Lima, Peru
- Died: 16 October 2018 (aged 68) Miami, Florida, U.S.
- Party: Independent
- Spouse: sylvia acuña koetzle
- Children: 4; sylvia Barbara Boloña, daniella boloña, carla alexandra boloña y joanna sofia boloña
- Education: University of the Pacific; University of Iowa; University of Oxford
- Occupation: Economist, entrepreneur, writer and politician

Carlos Boloña Behr (27 July 1950 – 17 October 2018) was a Peruvian economist and politician. He served as the Minister of Economy and Finance from 1991 to 1993, and again from July to November 2000 under the administration of President Alberto Fujimori.

== Biography ==
Son of Carlos Boloña Roose and María Mercedes Behr Galuzzo, he completed his primary studies at the Colegio Inmaculado Corazón and his secondary studies at the Colegio Santa María Marianistas.

He entered the Universidad del Pacífico, where he studied Economics. He earned a master's degree in economics from the University of Iowa and a doctorate in economics from the University of Oxford.

It was part of the Instituto Libertad y Democracia, directed by Hernando de Soto.

== Career ==
He was a consultant for the World Bank and the United States Agency for International Development (USAID).

He was Director of Foreign Trade Affairs of the National Integration Office between 1975 and 1978.

=== Public appearances ===
In the second government of Fernando Belaúnde Terry, he was Advisor to the Minister of Economy, Carlos Rodríguez Pastor Mendoza.

After the triumph of Alberto Fujimori in the general elections of 1990, Boloña was invited by Rodríguez-Pastor to a meeting in Miami with the president-elect and members of the economic team such as Adolfo Figueroa, Felipe Morris and Hernando de Soto. In this, Bologna explained how to deal with the economic crisis with a "severe economic adjustment." Days later, Fujimori offered him the position of Minister of Economy and Finance, which he did not accept because part of the team in charge of the Central Reserve Bank would be appointed only by the president. Fujimori finally appointed Juan Carlos Hurtado Miller as President of the Council of Ministers (Prime Minister) and Minister of Economy and Finance.

=== Minister of Economy and Finance ===
On 15 February 1991, Alberto Fujimori appointed him as Minister of Economy and Finance after the resignation of Juan Carlos Hurtado Miller. As minister, he applied a series of liberal policies to overcome the crisis in the Peruvian economy such as the privatization wave, monetary, labor, trade and finance reforms. In the same way, it developed programs for the reintegration of Peru into the international financial system. It eliminated development banks such as the Agrarian, Industrial, Housing and Mining Bank.

On 5 April 1992, President Fujimori gave a self-coup. Boloña, in the United States, met with representatives of the International Monetary Fund and the World Bank to see the impact of Fujimori's decision on the economic program; however, international organizations told him that they would stop cooperation until the rule of law was returned.

On 20 April 1992, Bologna submitted his resignation from office, which was not accepted by the president. The minister decided to continue in office and was part of the process to call for elections to the Democratic Constituent Congress. He resigned from the ministry in January 1993, due to the delay in signing an agreement of intent between Peru and the International Monetary Fund. Boloña accused Fujimori of governing "looking at polls and short-term popularities."

After his first term as Minister of Economy, he served as executive president of AFP Horizonte (1993–1994), executive director of Nicolini Hermanos SA (1994–1996), rector of the San Ignacio de Loyola University (1995–2000), president of the board of directors of Domino's Pizza Perú (1995–2000), member of the board of directors of Financiera CMR SA and Saga Falabella SA from June to July 2000.

In July 2000, the Ministry of Economy and Finance took over again, as such created the Rural Bank on the basis of the Rural Finance Corporation. It also promoted the competitive substitution of imports, promotion of industrialization, sectoral policies and tax exemptions that allow incentives for products due to the fact that Peru was in a period of recession due to the Asian and Russian crises. In November 2000, Alberto Fujimori was removed from the presidency of the Republic by Congress and Valentín Paniagua was appointed president. Boloña was replaced by Javier Silva Ruete.

His participation in politics has been discussed, especially because of his appearance in videos negotiating the possibility of carrying out a coup d'état supported by Vladimiro Montesinos, then head of the Peruvian intelligence services. The agreement was to carry out the coup in the event that Fujimori was not reelected, to perpetuate a co-government with the armed forces.
