= Fujimori =

Fujimori (written: 藤森, lit. 'wisteria forest') is a Japanese surname. Notable people with the surname include:

- Alberto Fujimori (藤森 謙也; 1938–2024), former Peruvian president and politician
  - Keiko Fujimori (藤森 恵子; born 1975), Peruvian politician and incumbent president, daughter of Alberto
  - Kenji Fujimori (藤森 健二; born 1980), Peruvian businessman and politician, son of Alberto
  - Santiago Fujimori (born 1946), Peruvian lawyer and politician, brother of Alberto
- Fujimori Shizuo (藤森 静雄; 1891–1943), Japanese printmaker
- Hiromasa Fujimori (藤森 太将; born 1991), Japanese swimmer
- Ichiro Fujimori (藤森 一郎), Japanese engineer
- Koshi Fujimori (藤森 耕資; born 1961), Japanese water polo player
- Natsuko Fujimori (藤森 奈津子; born 1961), Japanese shogi player
- Ryoji Fujimori (藤森 亮志; born 1997), Japanese footballer
- Shōichi Fujimori (藤森 昭一; 1926–2016), Grand Steward of the Imperial Household Agency
- Terunobu Fujimori (藤森 照信; born 1946), Japanese architect and architectural historian
- Tetsuya Fujimori (藤森 哲也; born 1987), Japanese shogi player
- Yoshiaki Fujimori (藤森 義明; born 1951), Japanese businessman
- Yoshifumi Fujimori (藤森 良文; born 1958), Japanese hurdler
- Yuka Fujimori (藤森 由香; born 1986), Japanese snowboarder

== Fictional characters ==
- Hiromi Fujimori (藤森 ひろみ), a character in the manga series Angelic Layer
- Minoru Fujimori (藤森 稔), a character in the manga series Hungry Heart: Wild Striker
- Fujimori Shuzen (藤森 主膳), a character in the video game Way of the Samurai 3
- Sunao Fujimori (藤守 直), a character in the visual novel Suki na Mono wa Suki Dakara Shōganai!
- Tomomi Fujimori (藤森 知美), a character in the video game Revelations: Persona

== See also ==
- 8387 Fujimori, a main-belt asteroid
