= Carlos Torres y Torres Lara =

Peruvian lawyer and politician (1942–2000)

Prime Minister of Peru
- In office 15 February 1991 – 6 November 1991
- President: Alberto Fujimori
- Preceded by: Juan Carlos Hurtado
- Succeeded by: Alfonso de los Heros

President of Congress
- In office 26 July 1997 – 26 July 1998
- Vice President: 1st Vice President Edith Mellado; 2nd Vice President Oswaldo Sandoval; 3rd Vice President Aurora Torrejón
- Preceded by: Víctor Joy Way
- Succeeded by: Víctor Joy Way
Ministerial offices
Minister of Foreign Relations
In office 15 February 1991 – 6 November 1991
President	Himself
Preceded by	Raúl Sánchez Sotomayor
Succeeded by	Augusto Blacker Miller
Minister of Work and Social Promotion
In office 28 July 1990 – 15 February 1991
Prime Minister	Juan Carlos Hurtado
Preceded by	Wilfredo Chau
Succeeded by	Alfonso de los Heros

Member of Congress
- In office 27 July 1992 – 16 June 2000
- Succeeded by: Ketty Solier
- Constituency: National
- Democratic Constituent Congress
- In office 30 December 1992 – 26 July 1995
- Constituency: National

Personal details
- Born: 1 November 1942 Lima, Peru
- Died: 16 June 2000 (aged 57) Lima, Peru
- Party: Cambio 90 – New Majority
- Spouse: Silvia Morales
- Children: 5, including Miki
- Occupation: Lawyer

Carlos Guillermo Torres y Torres Lara (1 November 1942 – 16 June 2000) was a Peruvian lawyer and politician who served as Prime Minister of Peru in 1991, and President of Congress from 1997 to 1998.

== Political career ==
During Alberto Fujimori's presidency, he was the Minister of Work and Social Promotion from 1990 to 1991, Minister of Foreign Relations and Prime Minister in 1991. He also served as a member of the Congress of the Republic of Peru from 1992 to 1995, and from 1995 to 2000; as President of Congress from 1997 to 1998.

== Personal life ==
Torres is married to Silvia Morales and has five children.

His son, Miki Torres, was elected Second Vice President of Peru and President of Senate and Congress of the Republic in 2026 under the government of Keiko Fujimori, daughter of Alberto Fujimori.
