= Víctor Joy Way =

Peruvian politician (born 1945)

- 許會

Prime Minister of Peru
- In office 3 January 1999 – 10 October 1999
- President: Alberto Fujimori
- Preceded by: Alberto Pandolfi
- Succeeded by: Alberto Bustamante

President of Congress
- In office 27 July 1998 – 3 January 1999
- Vice President: 1st Vice President; Ricardo Marcenaro; 2nd Vice President; Carlos Blanco Oropeza; 3rd Vice President; Luz Salgado
- Preceded by: Carlos Torres y Torres Lara
- Succeeded by: Ricardo Marcenaro (a.i.); Martha Hildebrandt
- In office 27 July 1996 – 26 July 1997
- Vice President: 1st Vice President; Carlos Torres y Torres Lara; 2nd Vice President; Martha Hildebrandt; 3rd Vice President; Luz Salgado
- Preceded by: Martha Chávez
- Succeeded by: Carlos Torres y Torres Lara
Ministerial offices
Minister of Economy and Finance
In office 3 January 1999 – 10 October 1999
President	Alberto Fujimori
Prime Minister	Himself
Preceded by	Jorge Baca Campodónico
Succeeded by	Efraín Goldenberg
Minister of Industry, Tourism, Integration and International Commercial Negotiations
In office 15 February 1991 – 28 August 1993
President	Alberto Fujimori
Prime Minister	Carlos Torres y Torres Lara; Alfonso de los Heros; Óscar de la Puente Raygada
Preceded by	Guido Pensano Allison
Succeeded by	Alberto Bustamante

Member of Congress
- In office 26 July 1995 – 26 July 2001
- Constituency: National

Member of the Democratic Constituent Congress
- In office 26 November 1992 – 26 July 1995
- Constituency: National

Personal details
- Born: Víctor Dionicio Joy Way Rojas; 10 March 1945 (age 81) Huánuco, Peru
- Party: Cambio 90-New Majority
- Other political affiliations: Peru 2000
- Education: National University of Engineering

Víctor Dionicio Joy Way Rojas (born 10 March 1945) is a Peruvian former Fujimorist politician. He served as Congressman, and various ministries during the administration of Alberto Fujimori.

== Political career ==
Born in Huánuco, Joy Way was a member of both the Democratic Constitutional Congress and the Congress of the Republic. He served as the President of the Congress for two non-consecutive terms from 1996 to 1997, and from 1998 to 1999. He was also the Prime Minister of Peru and Minister of Economy and Finance from January 1999 to October 1999. Joy Way was the first Prime Minister of Peru of Chinese Peruvian descent. Under Joy Way's administration, the Peruvian Congress overcame important international conflicts, including the Definitive and Global Peace Agreement between Peru and Ecuador in 1998. This agreement put an end to more than 150 years of conflict on the Amazon's borders. In 1997, Joy Way successfully participated in the hostage rescue process at the Japanese Embassy in Peru. In 2000, he was nominated as the “Entrepreneur of the Century" by the National University of Engineering in coordination with the Peruvian Confederation of Private Enterprises, for his contribution to the development of the Nation.

During his political career, Joy Way has been honored with various recognitions and official awards. In 1997, the President of China, Jiang Zemin, referred to Joy Way as an “old friend of the Chinese people“ during a visit to Beijing. In 2008, Joy Way received the Grand Maestre of the Republic of Brazil granted by the President of Brazil, followed by the Grand Maestre of the Republic of Bolivia granted by President Evo Morales. He was also honored with the highest decoration of the Congress of the Republic of Peru.

== Judicial trials, conviction and release ==
An ardent supporter of Alberto Fujimori. After the resignation of President Fujimori in late-2000, Joy Way, as well as many other public supporters and members of his government, faced judicial trials due to their participation in several notorious corruption cases. On November 26, 2007, Joy Way was additionally found guilty of having participated in the overthrow of Constitutional rule that took place in 1992 and was sentenced to jail by the Supreme Court of Peru. After a lengthy process, he was finally sentenced for tax evasion referring to his savings accounts in Switzerland. After seven years of effective jail, he was released in September 2008. He continues to live and operate as an international consultant in Peru.

In subsequent proceedings concerning the same funds, on 2 March 2020 the First National Transitional Superior Criminal Chamber Specialized in Organized Crime acquitted Joy Way and his co-defendant of the money-laundering charges. The court concluded, on the basis of the evidence examined in those proceedings, that the funds at issue were of lawful origin. On 26 April 2024, the Transitional Criminal Chamber of the Supreme Court of Justice of Peru declared inadmissible the appeal for annulment filed against the acquittal by the Specialized Public Prosecutor's Office for Money Laundering. The case was subsequently returned to the court of origin, and on 31 January 2025 the Transitional Supraprovincial Criminal Court ordered the proceedings definitively closed and archived.

Political offices
Preceded by Alberto Pandolfi	Prime Minister of Peru; 1999	Succeeded by Alberto Bustamante Belaunde
