= Ugaz =

Ugaz is a surname. Notable people with the surname include:

- Carlos Gamarra Ugaz, Peruvian politician
- José Ugaz (born 1959), Peruvian jurist
- Magdyel Ugaz (born 1984), Peruvian actress
- Manuel Ugaz (born 1981), Peruvian footballer
