= Efraín Goldenberg =

Peruvian politician (1929–2025)

Prime Minister of Peru
- In office 17 February 1994 – 28 July 1995
- President: Alberto Fujimori
- Preceded by: Alfonso Bustamante y Bustamante
- Succeeded by: Dante Córdova Blanco

Minister of Economy and Finance
- In office 15 October 1999 – 28 July 2000
- President: Alberto Fujimori
- Preceded by: Victor Joy Way
- Succeeded by: Carlos Boloña Behr

Minister of Foreign Relations
- In office 27 August 1993 – 28 July 1995
- President: Alberto Fujimori
- Preceded by: Óscar de la Puente Raygada
- Succeeded by: Francisco Tudela

Personal details
- Born: Efraín Goldenberg Schreiber; 28 December 1929 Lima, Perù
- Died: 10 December 2025 (aged 95) Lima, Perù
- Party: Independent; Cambio 90 (non-affiliated member)
- Spouse: Irene Pravatiner
- Education: National University of San Marcos
- Profession: Politician

Efraín Goldenberg Schreiber (or Efraím; 28 December 1929 – 10 December 2025) was a Peruvian politician who served as finance and economy minister, foreign relations minister, and prime minister during the presidency of Alberto Fujimori.

== Personal life ==
Goldenberg was born on 28 December 1929, in Lima, Peru, to Romanian-Jewish immigrants. He grew up in Talara, and attended the Universidad Nacional Mayor de San Marcos. Goldenberg died on 10 December 2025, at the age of 95.

== Political career ==
On 17 February 1994, he was sworn in as Prime Minister of Peru by President Alberto Fujimori, a position that he held until 1995. He was Peru's foreign relations minister prior to this office (28 August 1993 – 28 July 1995). On 15 October 1999, he became Peru's minister of economy and finance. He has had a role in the business community as chairperson of the National Fisheries Society and director of the Fund for the Promoting of Exports.

Political offices
Preceded by Alfonso Bustamante y Bustamante	Prime Minister of Peru; 1994–1995	Succeeded by Dante Córdova Blanco
