= Cambio 21 (political party) =

Political group in Peru

Change 21 Cambio 21
- Abbreviation: C21
- Leader: Maritza Garcia
- President: Alberto Fujimori; Kenji Fujimori
- General Secretary: Kenji Fujimori
- Founded: 20 March 2018
- Dissolved: 30 September 2019
- Split from: Popular Force
- Headquarters: Lima
- Ideology: Fujimorism; Progressive conservatism Liberal conservatism Economic liberalism Right-wing populism
- Political position: Right-wing
- Colors: Red

Party flag

Cambio 21 (lit. Change 21, C21) was a parliamentary group for the congressional term of 2016 to 2021 in the Congress of Peru. The group was introduced on 20 March 2018, led by then-congressman Kenji Fujimori, and was formally recognized on 19 December of the same year by the President of Congress Daniel Salaverry. Its members are former members of Popular Force. The parliamentary group was disbanded following the dissolution of the Congress on 30 September 2019 by President Martin Vizcarra.

== History ==
On 21 December 2017, proposals to impeach President Pedro Pablo Kuczynski reached the floor of Congress. Ultimately, the proposal to impeach the president failed as 10 members of the majority opposition party Popular Force voted against removing Kuczynski from the presidency. On 31 December 2017, the party's Disciplinary Committee recommended dismissing the ten members from Popular Force. On 1 March 2018, following dismissal from the party, Kenji Fujimori resigned from the leadership of the Fujimorist faction, changing moving towards a more progressive and liberal agenda. Later in January, Fujimori informally nicknamed his group as the Avengers, a reference to the fictional film Avengers: Infinity War. On 20 March, the informal group announced the creation of the political faction Cambio 21 with plans to become an official political party with the incarcerated former president Alberto Fujimori as leader.

On 19 December, the President of Congress Daniel Salaverry formally recognized the faction.

== Congressional members ==
Current congressional members of Change 21 are former members of Popular Force: Estelita Bustos, Maritza García, Clayton Galván, Marvin Palma, Luis Yika, Yesenia Ponce, Roberto Vieira, and Lizbeth Robles.
