= Javier Valle Riestra =

Peruvian lawyer and politician (1932–2024)

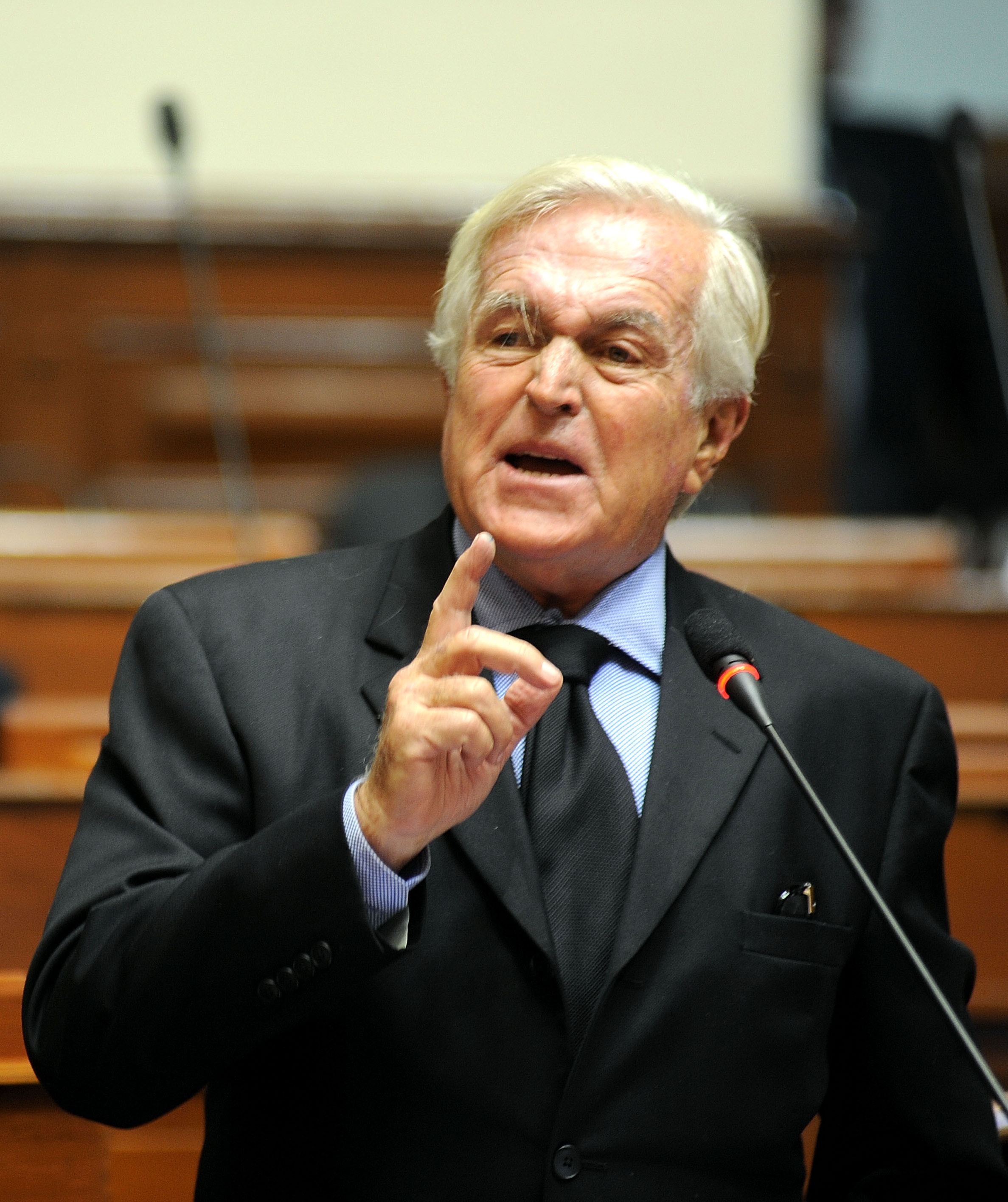
- Valle Riestra in 2010

Member of Congress
- In office 26 July 2006 – 26 July 2011
- Constituency: Lima

Prime Minister of Peru
- In office 4 June 1998 – 21 August 1998
- President: Alberto Fujimori
- Preceded by: Alberto Pandolfi
- Succeeded by: Alberto Pandolfi

Member of the Senate
- In office 26 July 1985 – 5 April 1992

Member of the Chamber of Deputies
- In office 26 July 1980 – 26 July 1985
- Constituency: Lima

Member of the Constituent Assembly
- In office 28 July 1978 – 26 July 1980
- Constituency: National

Lima City Councilman
- In office 1 January 1963 – 1 January 1970

Personal details
- Born: Javier Maximiliano Alfredo Hipólito Valle Riestra González Olaechea; 5 January 1932 Callao, Peru
- Died: 6 July 2024 (aged 92) Lima, Peru
- Party: Partido Aprista Peruano
- Spouse: Rosario Denegri
- Website: Official Site

Javier Maximiliano Alfredo Hipólito Valle Riestra González Olaechea or simply known as Javier Valle Riestra (5 January 1932 – 6 July 2024), was a Peruvian lawyer and politician. Known as a member of the Peruvian Aprista Party, he held several public offices, the most controversial among them being the President of the Council of Ministers during the presidency of Alberto Fujimori in 1998. This premiership is known for being the only one led by a politician from the opposition in Peruvian history during the Fujimori regime to date.

== Background ==
Born on 5 January 1932, to Richard Valle Riestra Meiggs and Hortensia González-Olaechea Olaechea, Valle Riestra studied at el Colegio Sagrados Corazones de la Recoleta in Lima. He studied law at the Pontifical Catholic University of Peru between 1950 and 1956. Between 1970 and 1971 he obtained his doctorate as a lawyer at the Universidad Complutense de Madrid. Grandson of Maximiliano González Olaechea, an outstanding physician, great-grandson of the former Prime Minister of Peru Manuel Pablo Olaechea and nephew of former Minister of Justice Pedro Carlos Olaechea Olaechea.

He was President of the Executive Commission of the Lima Bar Association, as well as Vice President of the Peruvian section of the Latin American Human Rights Association.

In 1995, he joined the advisory commission of the Ministry of Foreign Affairs on the conflict with Ecuador. As a member of this group, he defended the limits of Peru questioned by Ecuador as ambassador on a special mission to Spain, Germany and Italy.

Valle Riestra died in Lima on 6 July 2024, at the age of 92.

== Political career ==
=== Early political career ===
As a student at the Catholic University, he participated in demonstrations, demanding the legality of political parties, as well as free and democratic elections. He thereby met Ramiro Priano, who motivated him to seek the return to the legality of the Aprista Party. Valle Rossra defended the APRA in rallies with his rhetorical exhibitions.

From 1963 to 1969, he was a Member of the Lima City Council, elected under the Peruvian Aprista Party. When Francisco Morales Bermúdez convened the Constituent Assembly of Peru in 1978, Valle Riestra was elected Member of the Assembly. He became one of the assistants of Victor Raul Haya de la Torre and included some of his proposals in this Constitution, like the creation of the ombudsman's office, the Constitutional Court, and other proposals.

=== Prosecution under the Velasco regime and exile (1969–1976) ===
In 1969, he was criminally charged by the military regime of Juan Velasco Alvarado for allegedly planning a maneuver against the agrarian reform carried out by the government; because his in-laws (the Pardo family) were shareholders of the Pucalá farm and had been paid for the reform. The businessman Roberto Letts alerted Valle Riestra to the accusation and he took a flight to London via Paris. In various interviews, Valle Riestra commented that on the outward journey he spoke with the son of former Bolivian president Enrique Peñaranda, who recommended that he go into exile in Madrid.

In 1976, Valle Riestra returned to Peru and was acquitted of the charges.

=== Deputy and Senator ===
In the 1980 elections, he was elected as Member of the Chamber of Deputies. For the 1985 elections, Valle Riestra announced his candidacy for APRA nomination for president, but he withdrew after it was evident that he would lose to victor Alan García. Instead, he was elected Senator, being reelected in 1990. In the 1990 election, he was the second running mate of APRA nominee Luis Alva Castro but the ticket lost to Alberto Fujimori. His term as Senator ended in 1992, when President Alberto Fujimori dissolved Congress with a self-coup. Valle Riestra retired momentarily from politics.

=== Prime minister ===
In 1998, President Alberto Fujimori offered him the office of the Prime Minister of Peru, a post he assumed for a short time. He took office on 4 June 1998. On 7 July, Valle Riestra and his cabinet gained its confidence vote with 68 votes in favor, 32 against and 2 abstentions. But on 8 August, Valle Riestra resigned because his efforts to democratize the country were not viable. He was replaced on 21 August by Alberto Pandolfi, who had previously been premier. This premiership is known for being the only one led by a politician from the opposition in Peruvian history during the Fujimori regime to date.

His tenure in office cost him his disagreements with some members of the Peruvian Aprista Party, who totally disapproved of the Fujimori regime. During the same time, he disapproved of the leadership of Alan García of the APRA party, from his exile in France.

=== Congressman ===
In 2005, after being reconciled, Alan García offered a quota for the list to the Congress of the Republic of Peru for the 2006 elections. When he was elected as Member of Congress with the number 35 with a high number of votes, Valle Riestra said he had never wanted to be elected at a "unicameral" Congress because he was a supporter of bicameralism.

=== 2016 elections ===
In the 2016 elections, Valle Riesta ran for a seat in the Andean Parliament under the Popular Alliance, but he was not elected as he attained a low share of votes.

Political offices
Preceded by Alberto Pandolfi	Prime Minister of Peru; 1998	Succeeded by Alberto Pandolfi
