= Judicial reform in Peru under Alberto Fujimori =

Reform during 1990–2000 presidency

During the presidency of Alberto Fujimori from 1990 to 2000, the judiciary of Peru faced many reforms that the president enacted as a way to fulfill his campaign against terrorism. The reforms consisted of taking jurisdiction of terrorism cases away from civilian courts, changes in the structure of the court systems, and changes in the training of magistrates. These changes were implemented with popular support; however, they also received much criticism from the legal establishment and the international community.

== Background ==
Before the election of Fujimori, Peru was deeply affected by terrorism and the Judiciary branch of the country was enveloped with corruption and bureaucracy. By the elections of 1990 it was obvious that fighting terrorism with the state of that institution was going to be difficult because of the sluggish pace of the institution and also the low rate of convictions of those accused of terrorism; under a 10% conviction rate. For this reason during his inaugural speech Fujimori promised to reform the Judiciary.

== Reforms ==
During the first two years of his administration there were few changes to the Judiciary. This was a result of the opposition controlling congress and the Judiciary was reluctant to changes. To achieve his goals of reform he performed an “auto-coup” which resulted in the temporary suspension of congress, Judiciary, and also the constitution. At this point, using his presidential power of decree, he started to adopt laws and regulations pertaining to the trials of suspected terrorists and also the structure and functioning of the Judiciary. One of the first things he did was to send suspected terrorist to be tried on military tribunals. He made this move as a result of outrage in the country over judges “granting terrorists more than 200 early releases from prison a year”. Corrupt judges were also known for dramatically reducing the sentences of convicted terrorist. By taking terrorism cases away from them he was able to achieve faster and harsher sentences for terrorist. The military tribunals were done in secret to protect the military judges from threats or bribing. This of course, had the down side of lacking transparency and seeming anti-democratic. However, to this Fujimori responded pointing the approval of this changes and asked people to respect the “popular will”.

To fight corruption in the Judiciary, under the “Emergency Government of National Reconstruction”, he adopted measures of harsh punishments to penalize corrupt Judges and Prosecutors. This decree also targeted judges who were guilty of “political favoritism”, a measure adopted to deal with judges who were known for favoring opposition leaders. Another major aspect of his reform was Law 26623. This controversial law, which was approved by congress in a cloudy manner, created the Council of Judicial Coordination. This body had full power to reorganize the judiciary in coordination with other organizations of the state. The aim of this law was to achieve more coordination amongst the different establishments within the Judiciary. The law also handed control over the Academy of the Magistrates to the new council. This was extremely controversial since this academy was responsible for the training of Judges, so legal experts saw it as a move by the executive to control and politicize the Judiciary.

== Support and criticism ==
Fujimori was elected thanks to anti-establishment feelings. Right before the auto-coup the Peruvian congress, which had been stalling the reforms offered by the newly elected president, had an anemic approval rating of 17% compared to Fujimori’s 42% at that same time. For this reason his assault against the establishment was widely supported, resulting in a jump in post-coup approval rating to 81%. One poll showed that the reorganization of the Judiciary enjoyed 95% approval and only 2% disapproval. Months after the coup, thanks to some of the policies adopted post-coup, Abimael Guzman, the leader of Shining Path, was captured and successfully tried. This increased support for his policies even more. Released cables from the US embassy show the concerns of US diplomats in Peru who stated: “the Guzman arrest- [has] muted opposition criticism of his efforts to reconfigure Peru’s suspended institutions and enhance his executive authority”. Fujimori and his policies were widely popular in Peru up till the bitter end when he fled the country early in his third term because of the corruption and kidnapping charges that were brought against him.

Once the auto-coup took place, Fujimori started governing by mainly using decrees. This was criticized for being undemocratic, and his coup and manner of reforms received international condemnation. His reforms in the Judiciary were seen as an effort to increase presidential influence over that branch of government. International legal experts also claim that the changes “deprive the accused of a fair trial”. Human rights organizations strongly condemned his administration and many called for the release of suspected terrorist, who they claimed were being wrongly accused and held.
