= Federico Salas =

Peruvian Prime Minister (1950–2021)

Prime Minister of Peru
- In office 28 July 2000 – 21 November 2000
- President: Alberto Fujimori
- Preceded by: Alberto Bustamante Belaunde
- Succeeded by: Javier Pérez de Cuéllar

Governor of Huancavelica Region
- In office 1 January 2007 – 31 December 2010
- Preceded by: Salvador Espinoza Huarocc
- Succeeded by: Maciste Díaz Abad

Personal details
- Born: Luis Federico Salas Guevara Schultz; 4 September 1950 Lima, Peru
- Died: 28 April 2021 (aged 70) Huancavelica, Peru
- Party: Independent; Avancemos (2000)
- Spouse: Rosario Serpa
- Education: Peruvian Institute of Business Administration

Luis Federico Salas-Guevara Schultz (4 September 1950 – 28 April 2021) was a Peruvian politician. He was the 49th Prime Minister of Peru in 2000, being the final prime minister of President Alberto Fujimori's decade-long rule.

== Biography ==
Federico Salas was born in Lima on 4 September 1950, son of Federico Salas Guevara Alarco and Edith Schultz Macchiavello.

His childhood was spent in Huancavelica and later he traveled to Lima, doing his primary studies at the Inmaculado Corazón de María de Miraflores School and secondary studies at the Santa María Marianistas School.

He married in the first nuptials with Lyriam Succar, with whom he had 4 children, and in the second nuptials with Rosario Serpa Masías with whom he had a daughter.

After the death of his brother, he assumed the management of his assets until in 1973 his family's lands were expropriated by the military government during the implementation of the agrarian reform.

He returned to Lima to study administration at the Peruvian Institute of Business Administration (IPAE) and marketing at ESAN.

In 1993 he created the Center for Research, Promotion and Development in support of Huancavelica.

He ran for President of Peru in the 2000 elections under the Avancemos ticket but lost to President Alberto Fujimori. In an effort to reconcile with the opposition, President Alberto Fujimori, appointed Salas as Prime Minister. He served between 28 July to 21 November 2000 when Fujimori was ousted from power.

He was Mayor of Huancavelica, and then Governor of Huancavelica Region from 1 January 2007, until 31 December 2010.

Salas died on 28 April 2021, from COVID-19, at age 70.

== Controversies ==
In 2005, the Supreme Court sentenced him to 3 years in suspended prison, to the payment of a reparation of three million soles, and a two-year disqualification, for the crimes of ideological falsehood, illicit association to commit a crime and embezzlement. According to Ideele Radio, the former prime minister was prosecuted for having signed an Emergency Decree that expanded the Ministry of Defense's specifications by 69 million soles to allegedly implement a military plan against the Colombian FARC, which was never carried out.

In 2014, the Special Criminal Chamber of the Supreme Court determined that Carlos Boloña, Bergamino and Salas endorsed the delivery of US$15 million to Vladimiro Montesinos as "compensation" for his ten years of service in the Fujimori regime. For this they were sentenced to four years in suspended prison.

== See also ==
- Huancavelica Region

Political offices
| Preceded by Alberto Bustamante Belaunde | Prime Minister of Peru; 2000 | Succeeded by Javier Pérez de Cuéllar |
