= Alberto Pandolfi =

Peruvian businessman and politician

Alberto Ítalo Luis Pandolfi Arbulú (born 20 August 1940 in Lima) is a Peruvian businessman and politician who served as Prime Minister of Peru twice from 3 April 1996 to 4 June 1998, and from 21 August 1998 to 3 January 1999, under President Alberto Fujimori. During his terms, he also at times held the communications, production, fisheries and transport portfolios.

== Biography ==
He was born on August 20, 1940.

He entered the National University of Engineering (UNI), where he graduated as a Mechanical Electrical Engineer. He specialized in metallurgy, steel and cement.

He completed a Master of Business Administration at the Higher School of Business and Administration (ESAN). In the same way, he did postgraduate studies in Germany.

Pandolfi worked for eleven years at Cementos Lima and was General Manager.

He was General Manager of the San Fernando Packaging Chain.

He was Chairman of the Board of Conservas Peruanas.

He was General Manager of Metalúrgica Peruana S.A. He was part of Cepri for the privatization of the Yura de Arequipa Cement Factory.

He married Patricia Mercado Neumann, daughter of former minister Edgardo Mercado Jarrín.

== Judicial trials ==
In 2001 he was constitutionally accused in Congress and was disqualified for 5 years from exercising public function.

In June 2002, the National Prosecutor Nelly Calderón Navarro accused Pandolfi before Congress along with former ministers Jorge Baca Campodónico, Jorge Camet Dickmann and César Saucedo Sánchez for the crime of illicit association to commit a crime, illegal collusion, generic falsehood, embezzlement and corruption of officials to the detriment of the State. This is due to the Emergency Decrees endorsed together with President Alberto Fujimori for the purchase of airplanes from Belarus.

In May 2003, the Congress of the Republic of Peru approved Legislative Resolution 015-2002-CR, in which Pandolfi was disqualified for 10 years along with former ministers Víctor Joy Way, Jorge Baca Campodónico, César Saucedo Sánchez, Julio Salazar Monroe and Carlos Bergamino Cruz. In the same legislative resolution, Pandolfi was charged with the alleged commission of the crimes of Illicit Association to Delinquir, Illegal Collusion, Embezzlement and Ideological Falsehood.

Pandolfi's disqualification was due to the violation of the following articles of the constitution:

- Article 51: The Constitution prevails over all legal norms.
- Article 109: The law is mandatory from the day after its publication in the official gazette.
- Article 118 subsection 19: possibility of the President to issue extraordinary measures - emergency decrees.
- Article 125 subsection 2: The Council of Ministers is attributions to approve bills, legislative decrees, and emergency decrees.
- Article 126: Any agreement of the Council of Ministers requires the approval of the majority of its members, and is recorded in the minutes. Ministers cannot be managers of interests.

On September 12, 2003, the supreme instructor José María Balcázar Zelada ordered preventive detention for Pandolfi. After 29 days in hiding, Pandolfi surrendered to justice and was admitted to the San Jorge Prison. However, a few days later, the Special Criminal Chamber of the Supreme Court granted him house arrest.

Despite being sanctioned by Congress with a disqualification from exercising public functions for 10 years since 2003, in 2007 he was appointed head of the Vulnerability Reduction Program against the Recurrent El Niño Event (Preven) by the APRA government . Following the complaint by the independent press, Pandolfi was dismissed from office, bringing the complaint to the political leaders who hired him.

In December 2012, Pandolfi was sentenced to four years in suspended prison together with the former government ministers of César Saucedo Sánchez and Jorge Baca Campodónico by the Special Criminal Chamber of the Supreme Court for the crime of complicity in collusion for the irregular purchase of MIG aircraft 29.

Political offices
Preceded by Dante Córdova Blanco	Prime Minister of Peru; 1996–1998	Succeeded by Javier Valle Riestra
Preceded by Javier Valle Riestra	Prime Minister of Peru; 1998–1999	Succeeded by Víctor Joy Way
