= Dante Córdova =

Peruvian politician and lawyer

Prime Minister of Peru
- In office 28 July 1995 – 3 April 1996
- President: Alberto Fujimori
- Preceded by: Efraín Goldenberg
- Succeeded by: Alberto Pandolfi

Minister of Education
- In office 27 June 1995 – 3 April 1996
- Preceded by: Jorge Trelles
- Succeeded by: Domingo Palermo

Minister of Transport and Communications of Peru
- In office 3 February 1993 – 28 July 1995
- Preceded by: Alfredo Ross Antezana
- Succeeded by: Juan Castilla Meza

Personal details
- Born: Dante Córdova Blanco; 3 June 1943 (age 83) Lima, Peru
- Education: National University of San Marcos

Dante Córdova Blanco (born 3 June 1943) is a Peruvian lawyer, politician and businessman. He was Minister of Transport and Communications, Minister of Education and Prime Minister of Peru under President Alberto Fujimori.

== Early life ==
Dante Córdova completed his school studies at the College of Our Lady of Guadalupe, graduating in 1960. He completed his higher studies at the National University of San Marcos obtaining a law degree.

He has developed various activities in the business and educational field, holding the following positions:

- Member of the National Council of Education (CNE)
- Member of the board of directors of the Centro de Información y Educación para la Prevención del Abuso de Drogas (CEDRO),
- Member of the Consultative Council of the Santillana Foundation,
- Director of the Center for Educational Innovations and Evaluations,
- Member of the Arbitration Center of the Lima Chamber of Commerce

Córdova served as director of the Peruvian Corporation of Airports and Commercial Aviation (CORPAC) and Petroperú.

== Political career ==
On 3 February 1993, during the presidency of Alberto Fujimori, he held the position of Minister of Transportation and Communications. Since 28 August 1993, the Ministry covered the offices of Housing, Construction and Sanitation until 1999. During its administration, road development was given impetus, reflected in the reconstruction of the Pan-American highway and the construction of rural roads was promoted.

On 28 July 1995, in Fujimori's second term, he was appointed Minister of Education and President of the Council of Ministers of Peru.

Between December 1996 and April 1997, he was one of the hostages in the seizure of the Japanese ambassador's residence by the MRTA.

== See also ==
- President of the Council of Ministers of Peru
- Alberto Fujimori

Political offices
Preceded by Efraín Goldenberg	Prime Minister of Peru; 1995–1996	Succeeded by Alberto Pandolfi
