= Edith Mellado Céspedes =

Vice President of the National Congress
- In office 26 July 1997 – 26 July 1998
- President: Alberto Fujimori

Member of the Congress
- In office 26 July 1995 – 26 July 2000
- Constituency: National

Personal details
- Born: Edith Angélica Mellado Céspedes; 7 June 1938 (age 88) Huancayo
- Party: Cambio 90
- Occupation: Politician

Edith Angélica Mellado Céspedes (born 7 June 1938) is a Peruvian former Fujimorist politician and educator.

== Biography ==
Edith Mellado Céspedes was born on 7 June 1938 in Huancayo, Peru. She attended the local Maria Auxiliadora School through her primary and secondary education, and was awarded by the school for an excellent academic career as top of her class for five years. She studied mathematics and mathematical education at the National University of San Marcos and would complete her doctorate at the university. She would take postgraduate studies at the National University of Engineering (Peru), University of Chile, and the University of Murcia in Spain.

Mellado was the first rector of the Los Andes Peruvian University in her home town, Huancayo. She has also been the vice-rector of the National University of the Center of Peru. In 1990, she was a professor emeritus at the same school.

She has also worked at educational institutions like the Colegio Mariscal Castilla, Colegio Nuestra Señora de Cocharcas, and the Escuela Normal Superior "La Asunción" of Huancayo.

=== Politics ===
From 1997 to 1998, Mellado was Vice President of the Congress of the Republic of Peru during the government of Alberto Fujimori, representing the Cambio 90 party.
