= José Ugaz =

Peruvian jurist

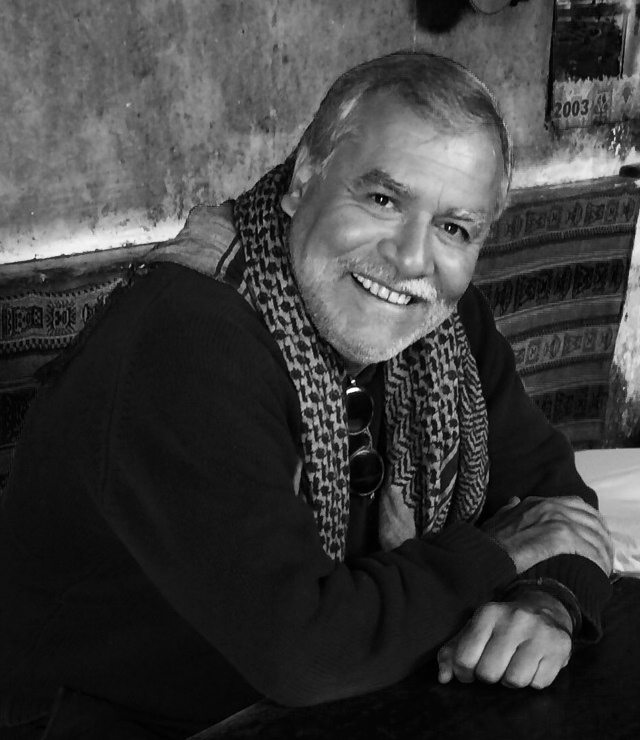
- José Ugaz, May 2014.

Personal details
- Born: José Carlos Ugaz Sánchez-Moreno; June 15, 1959 (age 67) Lima, Peru
- Education: Pontifical Catholic University of Peru
- Occupation: Lawyer. Professor of Criminal Law (Pucp)

José Carlos Ugaz Sánchez-Moreno (born June 15, 1959) is a Peruvian jurist. He served as ad hoc Attorney of Peru for one of the highest profile criminal cases in Peruvian history, involving the investigation of former President Fujimori and his chief of intelligence, Vladimiro Montesinos.

José Ugaz studied law at the Pontifical Catholic University of Peru. After graduating from Law school in 1984, with Postgraduate education in Human Rights and Development (Institute of Social Studies, The Hague, Netherlands) and Criminal law (University of Salamanca, Spain), he joined the Lima Bar Association and became partner of Bettocchi Ibarra-Ugaz Law firm. In 1993 he founded Benites, Mercado & Ugaz Law firm (now Benites, Forno & Ugaz).

He was retained as external consultant to Dutch organizations Hivos and Novib for Human rights assessment missions in Costa Rica and Sri Lanka (1990–1991). In 1992, he joined the UN Peacekeeping Mission for El Salvador (ONUSAL) as Human Rights Official, and in 1993 was member of the UN Election Observers Mission for El Salvador.

Professor of Criminal law at the Law School of the Pontifical Catholic University of Peru (1987–2011), José Ugaz was member of the Board of the Law School for the period 1995-2001 and re-elected for the period 2008-2014.

José Ugaz was appointed as Ad-Hoc State Attorney of the Republic of Peru in several corruption cases: Zanatti (1993-1994); CLAE (1994), INABIF (1997), Montesinos-Fujimori (2000-2002); in this particular case, he organized an office with 3 deputy State Attorneys, a Financial Intelligence Unit and a team of 25 people. During Ugaz administration, more than 200 judicial cases were opened against more than 1,500 members of the Fujimori’s network, Montesinos was captured in Venezuela in coordination with the FBI, as well as other 120 members of the organization including the former Attorney General, President of Congress, Supreme Court Justices, Electoral Magistrates, Broadcasters and 14 Generals of the Armed Forces and Police. During his mandate, US$205 million were frozen abroad and US$150 million were recovered from the United States, Switzerland, Grand Cayman and Peru.

In 2002 was invited to assume the presidency of PROETICA, the Peruvian chapter of Transparency International. In 2004 he was elected as Peruvian Eisenhower Fellow for the Multi-National Program (United States, March–May) and later that year, joined the Institutional Integrity Office of the World Bank (2004-2006).

Member of the group of experts for the "Second Session of the Ad Hoc Committee of the Negotiation of a United Nations Convention against Corruption” (2002). Since 2008, he is member of the International Anti-Corruption Conference (IACC) Council, and Individual Member of Transparency International. Representative of Transparency International at the expert meeting of the MESICIC (follow Mechanism of the Inter-American Convention Against Corruption, Washington DC, March 22, 2010). Expert member of the working group that prepared the "Asset Recovery Handbook: A Guide for Practitioners" (World Bank/UN, Viena 2009, Marsella 2010).

José Ugaz is speaker in different events and countries on Corruption and Money Laundering: APEC, OECD, United States, Argentina, Ecuador, Colombia, Paraguay, Bolivia, Nicaragua, Honduras, Panama, United Kingdom, Czech Republic, Mexico, Switzerland, Spain, Brazil, Chile, Guatemala, Japan, South Korea, Greece and Thailand.

He was elected as member of the Transparency International Board in 2011, and as chair of the board in 2014.
