= Alberto Bustamante Belaúnde =

Peruvian politician (1950–2008)

Alberto Bustamante

Prime Minister of Peru
- In office October 10, 1999 – July 28, 2000
- President: Alberto Fujimori
- Preceded by: Víctor Joy Way
- Succeeded by: Federico Salas

Minister of Justice
- In office October 13, 1999 – November 25, 2000
- President: Alberto Fujimori
- Preceded by: Jorge Bustamante Romero
- Succeeded by: Diego García Sayán

Personal details
- Born: September 12, 1950 Arequipa, Peru
- Died: February 7, 2008 (aged 57) Lima, Peru
- Party: Independent

José Alberto Bustamante Belaúnde (September 12, 1950 – February 7, 2008) was a Peruvian politician. He was the 48th Prime Minister of Peru and Minister of Justice from 1999 to 2000, under President Alberto Fujimori.

== Biography ==
Alberto Bustamante was born in Arequipa on September 12, 1950. He studied Law in Pontifical Catholic University of Peru.

He completed his university studies of law at the Pontificia Universidad Católica del Perú, graduating in 1973. Specialized in Administrative Law, he obtained a Master's Degree in Legal Institutions from the University of Wisconsin (United States).

Between 1972 and 1977 he worked at the Center for Development Studies and Promotion (DESCO) and between 1984 and 1993 as director of research at the Instituto Libertad y Democracia (ILD) together with Ernesto Mosqueira and Hernando de Soto. He was a lawyer for the Ministry of Transport and Communications and OSIPTEL and a consultant for the Commission for the formalization of Informal Property (COFOPRI). He was also a university professor in the chairs of Constitutional Law and Administrative Law at the Pontificia Universidad Católica del Perú (PUCP) and at the Peruvian University of Applied Sciences (UPC).

Between 1991 and 1992 he was a member of the Commission to elaborate the Law of General Norms of Administrative Procedures and in 1993 he advised the Education and Justice commissions of the Democratic Constituent Congress (CCD). Consultant to the Peruvian government, he participated in the High Level Commission that heard the cases against Peru before the Inter-American Commission on Human Rights, was part of the team that sustained abroad the Peruvian decision to withdraw from the contentious jurisdiction of the Inter-American Court of Human rights.

Bustamante was also a renowned professor of local universities such as the Pontifical Catholic University of Peru and the University of Applied Sciences.

He was President of the Council of Ministers from October 10, 1999 to July 28, 2000. He was also Minister of Justice from October 13, 1999 to November 2001.

He worked as adviser to the Foreign Relations Committee of the Congress since July 2007. Bustamante died of a heart attack at the offices of Congress in Lima on February 7, 2008, aged 57.
