= Koshi Fujimori =

Japanese water polo player

Personal information
- Born: 19 December 1961 (age 63)

Sport
- Sport: Water polo

Koshi Fujimori (藤森 耕資, Fujimori Kōshi, born 19 December 1961) is a Japanese former water polo player who competed in the 1984 Summer Olympics.
