= Santiago Fujimori =

Peruvian politician (born 1946)

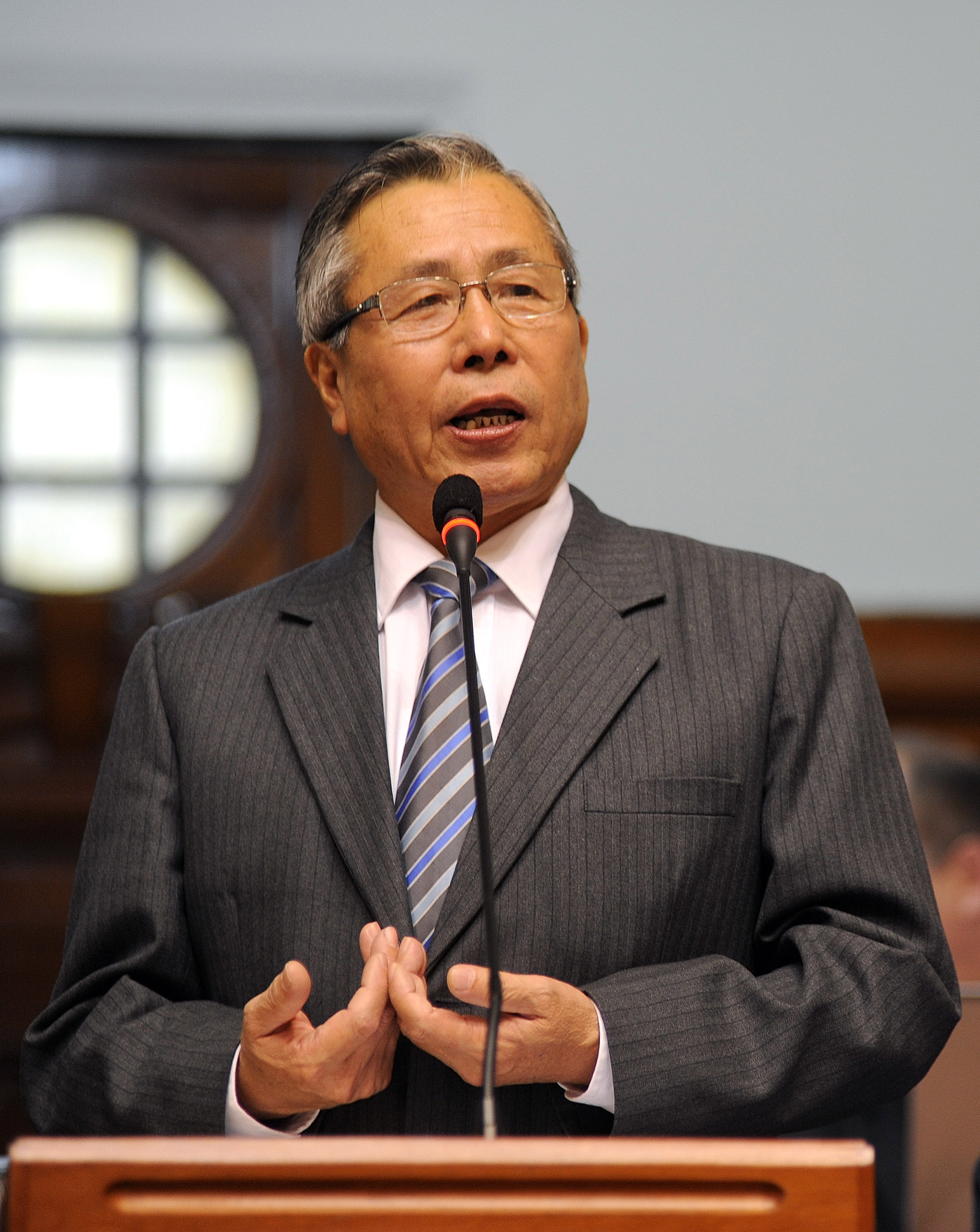
- Fujimori in October 2010

Member of Congress
- In office 26 July 2006 – 26 July 2011
- Constituency: Lima

Personal details
- Born: Santiago Fujimori Inomoto; 3 December 1946 (age 79) Lima, Peru
- Party: Popular Force
- Other political affiliations: Sí Cumple; Alliance for the Future
- Relatives: Alberto Fujimori (brother); Keiko Fujimori (niece); Kenji Fujimori (nephew)
- Education: Universidad Nacional Mayor de San Marcos
- Occupation: Lawyer
- Profession: Politician

Santiago Fujimori Inomoto (born 3 December 1946) is a Peruvian lawyer, politician and a former congressman, representing Lima for the 2006–2011 term. Of Japanese descent, Fujimori is the younger brother of former President Alberto Fujimori who was the President of Peru from 1990 until 2000 and the uncle of Keiko Fujimori and Kenji Fujimori. During his brother's presidency, he served as an advisor.

== Early life and education ==
Fujimori graduated from the National University of San Marcos, where he earned a bachelor's degree in 1974 and a law degree in 1975.

== Political career ==
During his brother's presidency, he served as an advisor. He was involved in a case about an alleged irregular purchase of the Presidential Plane. When his brother's regime fell, he stayed away from politics.

In the 2006 election, he was elected Congressman, representing the city of Lima for the 2006–2011 term after getting 22,992 votes, in which he also ran unsuccessfully for First Vice President as the running mate of Martha Chávez under the Fujimorist Alliance for the Future coalition. He retired from politics after he lost his seat when he unsuccessfully ran for re-election in the 2011 elections under the Force 2011 party of his niece, Keiko, representing the Lima Region, but he was not elected.

=== Congressman (2006–2011) ===
As of August 3, 2006, the Board of Spokesperson of the Congress of the Republic, as well as the Multi-Party Board, which decides the organization of the different work commissions in Congress, appointed him as Coordinator of the Energy and Mines Commission. By tradition, the coordinators later become Commission Chairs. He was president of the Energy and Mines Commission from August 11, 2006 to July 26, 2007. He was also president of the Foreign Relations Commission from August 14, 2008 to July 26, 2009, performing important work. In 2008, he was president of the Working Group in charge of systematizing national legislation (created by the Justice Commission of the Peruvian Congress). Between October 6, 2009 and July 26, 2011, he was the President of the Special Multiparty Commission in Charge of the Peruvian Legislative Order, which was elected unanimously.
