= Óscar de la Puente Raygada =

Peruvian politician (born 1938)

Prime Minister of Peru
- In office 6 April 1992 – 28 August 1993
- President: Alberto Fujimori
- Preceded by: Alfonso de los Heros Pérez-Albela
- Succeeded by: Alfonso Bustamante

Minister of Foreign Relations
- In office 24 April 1992 – 28 August 1993
- Prime Minister: Himself
- Preceded by: Augusto Blacker Miller
- Succeeded by: Efraín Goldenberg

Personal details
- Born: 4 October 1938 (age 87) Lima, Peru
- Occupation: Politician; lawyer
- Awards: Order of the Sun of Peru

Óscar de la Puente Raygada (born 4 October 1938) is a Peruvian former politician and lawyer who served as Prime Minister of Peru and Minister of Foreign Relations from 1992 to 1993.

== Early life ==
Óscar de la Puente Raygada was born on 4 October 1938.

== Political career ==
He served as Prime Minister of Peru from 1992 to 1993.

== See also ==
- List of foreign ministers in 1993
