= Augusto Blacker Miller =

Peruvian politician (1945–2026)

Augusto Blacker Miller (18 October 1945 – 23 January 2026) was a Peruvian politician who served as Minister of Foreign Affairs. Miller died on 23 January 2026, at the age of 80.
