= Alberto Fujimori =

President of Peru from 1990 to 2000

His Excellency Alberto Fujimori
- Official portrait, 1990

President of Peru (Note: Styled as "President of the Emergency and National Reconstruction Government" from 5 April 1992 until 5 January 1993, before and after styled as "Constitutional President of the Republic of Peru".)
- In office 28 July 1990 – 22 November 2000 (Note: Disputed with Carlos García y García from 5 April 1992 until 20 April 1992 and with Máximo San Román from 21 April 1992 until 5 January 1993.)
- Prime Minister: See list: Juan Carlos Hurtado Miller; Carlos Torres y Torres Lara; Alfonso de los Heros; Óscar de la Puente Raygada; Alfonso Bustamante; Efraín Goldenberg; Dante Córdova Blanco; Alberto Pandolfi; Javier Valle Riestra; Víctor Joy Way; Alberto Bustamante Belaúnde; Federico Salas
- Vice President: 1st Vice President: Máximo San Román (1990–1992) (Note: Office vacant from 1992 to 1995); Ricardo Márquez (1995–2000); Francisco Tudela (Jul–Nov 2000) (Note: Office vacant from 21 to 22 November 2000); 2nd Vice President: Carlos García y García (1990–1992); César Paredes Canto (1995–2000); Ricardo Márquez (Jul–Nov 2000)
- Preceded by: Alan García
- Succeeded by: Valentín Paniagua

President of the National Assembly of Rectors
- In office 1987–1989
- Preceded by: Manuel Zevallos Vera
- Succeeded by: Carlos Chirinos Villanueva

Rector of the National Agrarian University
- In office 1984–1989
- Preceded by: Unknown
- Succeeded by: Alfonso Flores Mere

Personal details
- Born: Alberto Kenya Fujimori Inomoto; 26 July 1938 Miraflores, Lima, Peru
- Died: 11 September 2024 (aged 86) San Borja, Lima, Peru
- Resting place: Campo Fe Huachipa Cemetery, Lima
- Citizenship: Peru; Japan
- Party: Change 90 (1990–1998); Sí Cumple (1998–2010); People's New Party (2007–2013, in Japan); Popular Force (2024)
- Other political affiliations: New Majority (1992–1998, non-affiliated member); Peru 2000 (1999–2001); Alliance for the Future (2005–2010); Change 21 (2018–2019)
- Spouses: Susana Higuchi (m. 1974; div. 1995) Satomi Kataoka (m. 2006)
- Children: 4, including Keiko and Kenji
- Relatives: Santiago Fujimori (brother)
- Education: National Agrarian University (BS); University of Strasbourg; University of Wisconsin–Milwaukee (MS)
- Website: alberto.fujimori.pe
- Criminal information
- Status: Deceased (convicted prior to death)
- Criminal charges: Human rights abuses, murder, kidnapping, embezzlement, abuse of power, bribery and corruption
- Penalty: 25 years in prison (Human rights abuses, murder and kidnapping charges); Six years in prison (Abuse of power charges); Seven-and-a-half years in prison (Embezzlement charges); Six years in prison (Corruption and bribery charges)

Alberto Kenya Fujimori Inomoto (Note: Spanish pronunciation: [alˈβeɾto ˈkeɲɟʝa fuxiˈmoɾi inoˈmoto]; Japanese: 藤森 謙也, romanized: Fujimori Ken'ya, Japanese pronunciation: [ɸɯʑiꜜmoɾi keꜜɰ̃ja]) (26 (Note: Fujimori claimed to have been born on 28 July, the anniversary of Peru's independence from Spain, but other documents have listed a birth date of 26 July; Fujimori cited the latter date in a court hearing.) July 1938 – 11 September 2024) was a Peruvian politician, professor and agriculture engineer who served as the president of Peru from 1990 to 2000. During Fujimori's tenure, the Peruvian Armed Forces severely weakend the far-left guerrilla group Shining Path, halting the group's actions while also killing thousands of civilians. Fujimori became known for his neoliberal political and economic ideology of Fujimorism, which pushed a free market economy and social conservatism. He also collaborated with the head of the National Intelligence Service (SIN), Vladimiro Montesinos, to consolidate power and eliminate political opponents. Fujimori's presidency was marked by authoritarian measures, excessive use of propaganda, entrenched political corruption, multiple cases of extrajudicial killings, and human rights violations.

Born in Lima, Fujimori was the country's first president of Japanese descent, and was an agronomist and university rector prior to entering politics. Fujimori emerged as a politician during the midst of the internal conflict in Peru, the Peruvian Lost Decade, and the ensuing violence caused by the Shining Path. In 1992, during his first presidential term, Fujimori, with the support of SIN and the Peruvian Armed Forces, adopted the military's Plan Verde, targeting members of Peru's indigenous community and subjecting them to forced sterilizations. As part of the plan, he also carried out a self-coup against the Peruvian legislature and judiciary. Fujimori dissolved the Peruvian Congress and Supreme Court, effectively making him a dictator of Peru. The coup was criticized by Peruvian politicians, international governments, intellectuals and journalists, but was well received by the country's private business sector and a substantial part of the public. Following the coup d'état, Fujimori drafted a new constitution in 1993, which was approved in a referendum, and was elected as president for a second term in 1995 and controversially for a third term in 2000.

In 2000, following his third term election, Fujimori faced mounting allegations of widespread corruption and crimes against humanity within his government. Subsequently, Fujimori fled to Japan, where he submitted his presidential resignation via fax. Peru's congress refused to accept his resignation, instead voting to remove him from office on the grounds that he was "permanently morally disabled". While he was in Japan, Peru issued multiple criminal charges against him, stemming from the corruption and human rights abuses that occurred during his government. Peru requested Fujimori's extradition from Japan, which was refused by the Japanese government as they recognised him as a Japanese citizen, and Japanese laws stipulating against extraditing its citizens. In 2005, while Fujimori was visiting Santiago, Chile, he was arrested by the Carabineros de Chile at the request of Peru, and extradited to Lima to face charges in 2007. Fujimori was sentenced to 25 years in prison, but was pardoned by president Pedro Pablo Kuczynski in 2017, and was officially released in December 2023 following several years of legal proceedings regarding the legality of his pardon. He died in September 2024, nine months after his release. In 2026, his daughter Keiko became the country's first female elected president.

== Early life, education, and career ==
Alberto Kenya Fujimori Inomoto was born on 26 July 1938 in the Miraflores district of Lima, Peru, to Japanese parents Naoichi Fujimori (né Minami) and Mutsue Inomoto. His parents were originally from Kumamoto Prefecture and immigrated to Peru in 1934. Although Fujimori's father was Buddhist and his mother was a follower of Tenrikyo, he was baptized and raised Catholic.

Fujimori in 1955

Fujimori received his early education from 1946 to 1948 at "Hoshi Shokai Gakuen", a Japanese private school where subjects were taught both in Spanish and Japanese. Japanese was the language of his childhood home and he often code switched with Japanese whenever he spoke Spanish as a child. As Fujimori's parents felt the need for their children to become proficient in Spanish in order to fully assimilate into Peruvian society, his parents transferred him to La Rectora in 1949, a mainstream Peruvian primary school where subjects were taught solely in Spanish. He subsequently attended high school at Colegio Nuestra Señora de la Merced. In 1956, he graduated from La Gran Unidad Escolar Alfonso Ugarte in Lima.

Fujimori pursued his undergraduate studies at the Universidad Nacional Agraria La Molina in 1957, graduating first in his class in 1961 with a degree in agricultural engineering. He briefly lectured in mathematics at the university before moving to France to study physics at the University of Strasbourg. In 1969, he earned a master's degree in mathematics from the University of Wisconsin–Milwaukee through a Ford Foundation scholarship. In recognition of his academic achievements, the sciences faculty of the National Agrarian University offered Fujimori the deanship and in 1984 appointed him to the rectorship of the university, which he held until 1989. In 1987, Fujimori also became president of the National Assembly of University Rectors, a position that he held twice. He also hosted a TV show called Concertando from 1988 to 1989 on Peru's state-owned network, Canal 7.

=== Birthplace dispute ===
In July 1997, the news magazine Caretas alleged that Fujimori was born in Japan, in his father's hometown of Kawachi, Kumamoto Prefecture. Because the Constitution of Peru requires the president to have been born in Peru, this would have made Fujimori ineligible to be president. The magazine, which had been sued for libel by Vladimiro Montesinos seven years earlier, reported that Fujimori's birth and baptismal certificates might have been altered. Caretas also alleged that Fujimori's mother declared having two children when she entered Peru; Fujimori was the second of four children. Caretas's contentions were hotly contested in the Peruvian media; the magazine Sí described the allegations as "pathetic" and "a dark page for [Peruvian] journalism". Scholars Cynthia McClintock and Fabián Vallas note that the issue appeared to have died down among Peruvians after the Japanese government announced in 2000 that "Fujimori's parents had registered his birth in the Japanese Embassy in Lima". The Japanese government determined that he was also a Japanese citizen because of his parents' registration in the koseki.

== Presidency (1990–2000) ==
=== First term ===
==== 1990 general election ====
During the first presidency of Alan García, the economy had entered a period of hyperinflation and the political system was in crisis due to the country's internal conflict, leaving Peru in "economic and political chaos". The armed forces grew frustrated with the inability of the García administration to handle the nation's crises and began to draft Plan Verde as a plan to overthrow his government. According to Rospigliosi, lawyer and friend of Fujimori, Vladimiro Montesinos was not initially involved with the Plan Verde, but his ability to resolve issues for the military resulted with the armed forces tasking Montesinos with implementing the plan with Fujimori, Both General Nicolás de Bari Hermoza and Montesinos were responsible for the relationship between the armed forces and Fujimori. Mario Vargas Llosa, Fujimori's final opponent in the election, later reported that United States Ambassador to Peru, Anthony C. E. Quainton, personally told him that allegedly leaked documents of the Central Intelligence Agency (CIA) purportedly being supportive of Fujimori's candidacy were authentic. Rendón writes that the United States supported Fujimori because of his relationship with Montesinos, who had previously been charged with spying on the Peruvian military for the CIA.

During the second round of elections, Fujimori originally received support from left-wing groups and those close to the García government, exploiting the popular distrust of the existing Peruvian political establishment and the uncertainty about the proposed neoliberal economic reforms of his opponent, novelist Mario Vargas Llosa. Fujimori won the 1990 presidential election as a dark horse candidate under the banner of Cambio 90, defeating Vargas Llosa in a surprise result. He capitalized on profound disenchantment with outgoing president Alan García and the American Popular Revolutionary Alliance party (APRA).

During the campaign, Fujimori was nicknamed "el chino," which translates to "the Chinese guy" or "the Chinaman"; it is common for people of any East Asian descent to be called chino in Peru, as elsewhere in Spanish-speaking Latin America, both derogatorily and affectionately. Although he was of Japanese heritage, Fujimori suggested that he was always pleased by the nickname, which he perceived as a term of affection. With his election victory, he became the third person of East Asian descent to serve as presidency of a South American state, after President Arthur Chung of Guyana and Henk Chin A Sen of Suriname.

==== Economic shock ====
According to news magazine Oiga, the armed forces finalized plans on 18 June 1990 involving multiple scenarios for a coup d'état to be executed on 27 July 1990, the day prior to Fujimori's inauguration. The magazine noted that in one of the scenarios, titled "Negotiation and agreement with Fujimori. Bases of negotiation: concept of directed Democracy and Market Economy", Fujimori was to be directed on accepting the military's plan at least 24 hours before his inauguration. Fernando Rospigliosi states "an understanding was established between Fujimori, Montesinos and some of the military officers" involved in the Plan Verde prior to Fujimori's inauguration. Montesinos and SIN officials ultimately assumed the armed forces' position in the plan, placing SIN operatives into military leadership roles. Fujimori went on to adopt many of the policies outlined in the Plan Verde. Fujimori was sworn in as president on 28 July 1990, allegedly his 52nd birthday.

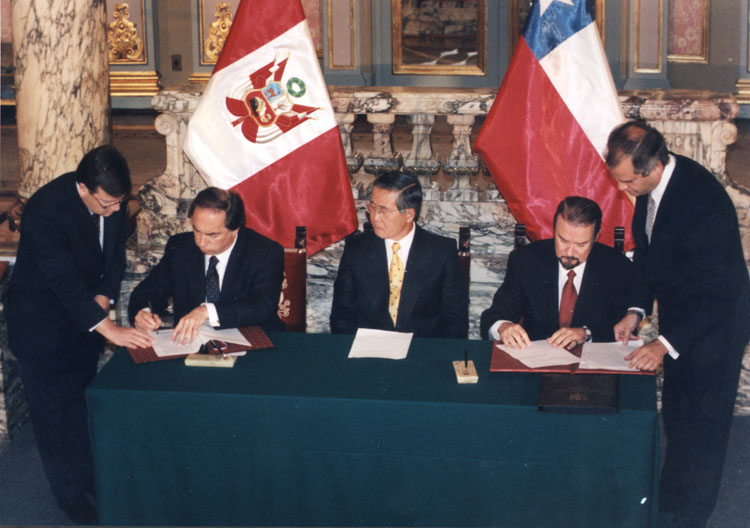
Fujimori (center) on the signature of the Protocol on outstanding clauses of the 1929 Treaty of Lima with Chile, 13 November 1999

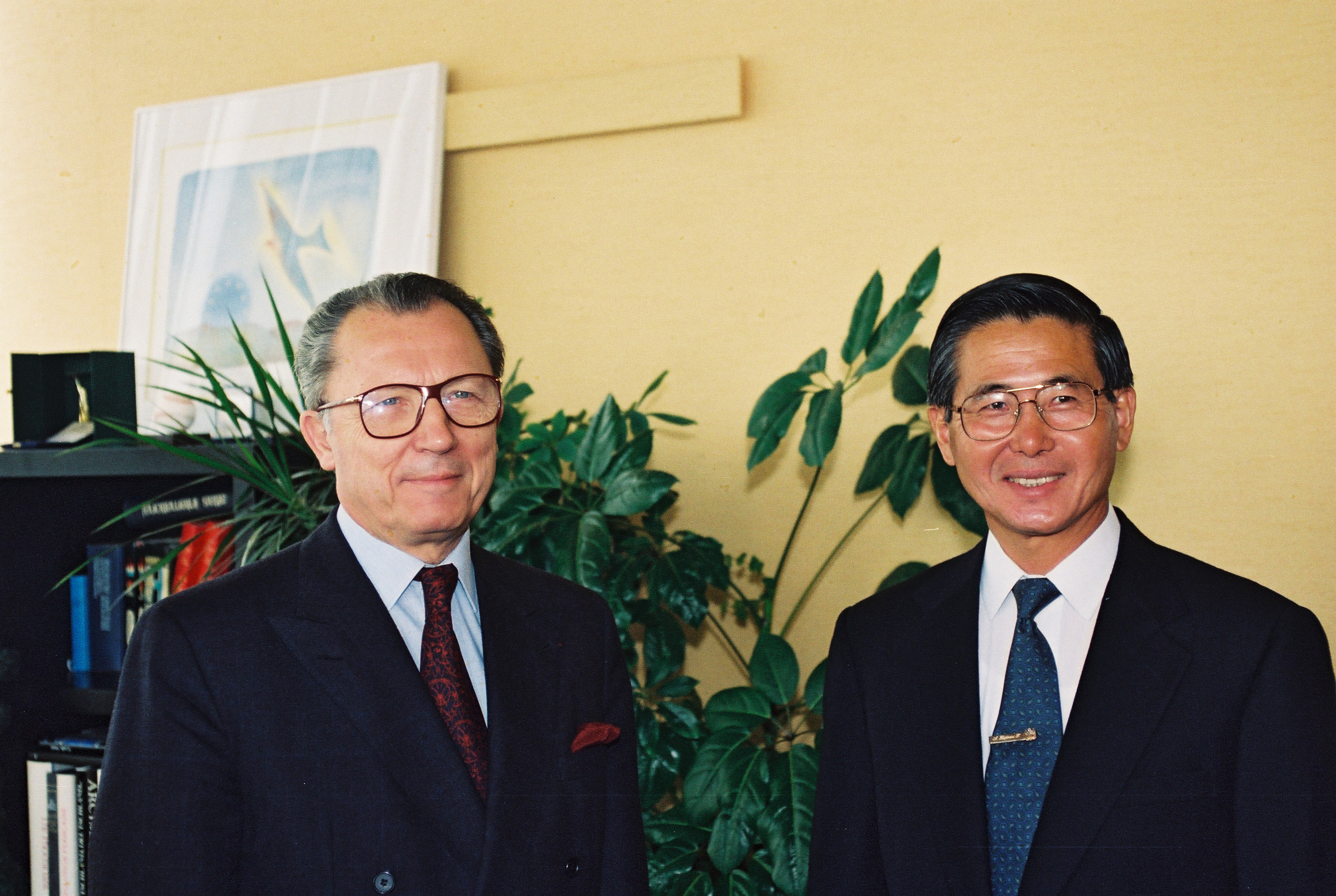
Fujimori with President of the European Commission Jacques Delors in Brussels, 21 October 1991

During his first term in office, Fujimori enacted wide-ranging neoliberal reforms, known as the Fujishock. Hernando de Soto, the founder of the Institute for Liberty and Democracy, became an advisor. Between 1988 and 1995, de Soto and the ILD were mainly responsible for some four hundred initiatives, laws, and regulations that led to significant changes in Peru's economic system. Under Fujimori, de Soto served as "the President's personal representative", with The New York Times describing de Soto as an "overseas salesman" for Fujimori in 1990, writing that he had represented the government when meeting with creditors and United States representatives. Others dubbed de Soto as the "informal president" for Fujimori. De Soto proved to be influential to Fujimori, who began to repeat de Soto's advocacy for deregulating the Peruvian economy. The International Monetary Fund (IMF) was content with Peru's measures, and guaranteed loan funding for Peru. Inflation rapidly began to fall and foreign investment capital flooded in. Nonetheless, the Fujishock restored Peru to the global economy, though not without immediate social cost; international business participated in crony capitalism with the government. The privatization campaign involved selling off of hundreds of state-owned enterprises, and replacing the country's troubled currency, the inti, with the nuevo sol. Fujimori's initiative relaxed private sector price controls, drastically reduced government subsidies and government employment, eliminated all exchange controls, and also reduced restrictions on investment, imports, and capital. Tariffs were radically simplified, the minimum wage was immediately quadrupled, and the government established a US$400 million poverty relief fund. The latter seemed to anticipate the economic agony to come: the price of electricity quintupled, water prices rose eightfold, and gasoline prices 3,000%.

==== Military regime ====
During Fujimori's first term in office, APRA and the Democratic Front (Vargas Llosa's party) remained in control of both chambers of Congress—then composed of a Chamber of Deputies and a Senate—hampering the enactment of economic reform. Fujimori also had difficulty combating the Shining Path due largely to what he perceived as intransigence and obstructionism in Congress. By March 1992, the Congress met with the approval of only 17% of the electorate, according to one poll; in the same poll, the president's approval stood at 42%.

Fujimori and his military handlers had planned for a coup during his preceding two years in office. In response to the political deadlock, Fujimori, with the support of the military, carried out a self-coup on 5 April 1992, Congress was shut down by the military, the constitution was suspended and the judiciary was dissolved. Without political obstacles, the military was able to implement the objectives outlined in Plan Verde while Fujimori served as president to project an image that Peru was supporting a liberal democracy. Montesinos would go on to adopt the actual function of Peru's government.

The coup was well received by the public, with Fujimori's approval rating jumping significantly in the wake of the coup. Fujimori often cited this public support in defending the coup, which he characterized as "not a negation of real democracy, but on the contrary... a search for an authentic transformation to assure a legitimate and effective democracy". Fujimori believed that Peruvian democracy had been nothing more than "a deceptive formality—a façade". He claimed the coup was necessary to break with the deeply entrenched special interests that were hindering him from rescuing Peru from the chaotic state in which García had left it.

Fujimori's coup was immediately met with near-unanimous condemnation from the international community. The Organization of American States (OAS) denounced the coup and demanded a return to "representative democracy", despite Fujimori's claim that the coup represented a "popular uprising". Foreign ministers of OAS member states reiterated this condemnation of the autogolpe. They proposed an urgent effort to promote the reestablishment of "the democratic institutional order" in Peru. Negotiations between the OAS, the government, and opposition groups initially led Fujimori to propose a referendum to ratify the auto-coup, but the OAS rejected this. Fujimori then proposed scheduling elections for a Democratic Constituent Congress (CCD), which would draft a new constitution to be ratified by a national referendum. Despite a lack of consensus among political forces in Peru regarding this proposal, an ad hoc OAS meeting of ministers nevertheless endorsed this scenario in mid-May. Elections for the Democratic Constituent Congress were held on 22 November 1992.

Various states individually condemned the coup. Venezuela broke off diplomatic relations, and Argentina withdrew its ambassador. Chile joined Argentina in requesting Peru's suspension from the Organization of American States. International lenders delayed planned or projected loans, and the United States, Germany, and Spain suspended all non-humanitarian aid to Peru. Fujimori, in turn, later received most of the participants of the November 1992 Venezuelan coup attempt as political asylees, who had fled to Peru after its failure.

Peru–United States relations earlier in Fujimori's presidency had been dominated by questions of coca eradication and Fujimori's initial reluctance to sign an accord to increase his military's eradication efforts in the lowlands. Fujimori's autogolpe became a major obstacle to relations, as the United States immediately suspended all military and economic aid, with exceptions for counter-narcotic and humanitarian funds. Two weeks after the self-coup, the George H. W. Bush administration changed its position and officially recognized Fujimori as the legitimate leader of Peru, partly because he was willing to implement economic austerity measures, but also because of his adamant opposition to the Shining Path.

On 13 November 1992, General Jaime Salinas Sedó attempted to overthrow Fujimori in a failed military coup. Salinas asserted that his intentions were to turn Fujimori over to be tried for violating the constitution.

=== Second term ===
The 1993 Constitution allowed Fujimori to run for a second term, and in April 1995, at the height of his popularity, he easily won reelection with almost two-thirds of the vote. His main opponent, former Secretary-General of the United Nations Javier Pérez de Cuéllar, won only 21 percent of the vote. Fujimori's supporters won comfortable majority in the new unicameral Congress. One of the first acts of the new congress was to declare an amnesty for all members of the military and police accused or convicted of human rights abuses between 1980 and 1995.

During his second term, Fujimori and Ecuadorian President Sixto Durán Ballén signed a peace agreement over a border dispute that had simmered for more than a century. The treaty allowed the two countries to obtain international funds for developing the border region. Fujimori also settled some issues with Chile, Peru's southern neighbor, which had been unresolved since the 1929 Treaty of Lima.

The 1995 election was the turning point in Fujimori's career. Peruvians began to be more concerned about freedom of speech and the press. Before he was sworn in for a second term, he stripped two universities of their autonomy and reshuffled the national electoral board. This led his opponents to call him "Chinochet", a reference to his previous nickname and to Chilean dictator Augusto Pinochet. Modeling his rule after Pinochet, Fujimori reportedly enjoyed this nickname.

According to a poll by the Peruvian Research and Marketing Company conducted in 1997, 40.6% of Lima residents considered President Fujimori an authoritarian.

In addition to the fate of democracy under Fujimori, Peruvians were becoming increasingly interested in the myriad allegations of criminality that involved Fujimori and Montesinos. Using SIN, Fujimori gained control of the majority of the armed forces, with the Financial Times stating that "[i]n no other country in Latin America did a president have so much control over the armed forces".

A 2002 report by Health Minister Fernando Carbone later suggested that Fujimori was involved in the forced sterilizations of up to 300,000 indigenous women between 1996 and 2000, as part of a population control program. A 2004 World Bank publication said that in this period Montesinos's abuse of the power Fujimori granted him "led to a steady and systematic undermining of the rule of law".

=== Third term, flight to Japan and resignation ===
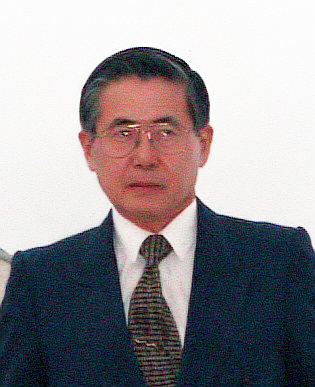
Fujimori in October 1998

By the arrival of the new millennium, Fujimori became increasingly authoritarian, strengthening collaboration with Montesinos and the NIS. Shortly after he began his second term, his supporters in Congress passed a law of "authentic interpretation" which effectively allowed him to run for another term in 2000. A 1998 effort to repeal this law by referendum failed. In late 1999, Fujimori announced that he would run for a third term. The electoral authorities, which were politically sympathetic to him, accepted his argument that the two-term restriction did not apply to him, as it was enacted while he was already in office.

Exit polls showed that Fujimori fell short of the 50% required to avoid an electoral runoff, but the first official results showed him with 49.6% of the vote, just short of outright victory. Eventually, he was credited with 49.9%—20,000 votes short of avoiding a runoff. Despite reports of numerous irregularities, the international observers recognized an adjusted victory of Fujimori. As voting is mandatory in Peru, Fujimori's primary opponent, Alejandro Toledo, called for his supporters to spoil their ballots in the runoff by writing "No to fraud!" on them. The Organization of American States electoral observation mission pulled out of the country, saying that the process would be neither free nor fair.

In the runoff, Fujimori won with 51.1% of the total votes. While votes for Toledo declined from 37.0% of the total votes cast in the first round to 17.7% of the votes in the second round, invalid votes jumped from 8.1% of the total votes cast in the first round to 31.1% of total votes in the second round. The large percentage of invalid votes in the election suggests widespread dissatisfaction with the electoral process among voters.

Although Fujimori won the runoff with only a bare majority (but 3/4 valid votes), rumors of irregularities led most of the international community to shun his third swearing-in on 28 July. For the next seven weeks, there were daily demonstrations in front of the presidential palace. As a conciliatory gesture, Fujimori appointed former opposition candidate Federico Salas as prime minister. Opposition parties in Congress refused to support this move, and Toledo campaigned vigorously to have the election annulled. At this point, a corruption scandal involving Montesinos broke out, and exploded into full force on the evening of 14 September 2000, when the cable television station Canal N (the only independent television network at the time) broadcast footage of Montesinos apparently bribing opposition congressman Alberto Kouri to defect to Fujimori's Peru 2000 party. The video was originally presented at a press conference by Fernando Olivera and Luis Iberico of the Independent Moralizing Front (FIM); many other similar videos were released in the following weeks.

Fujimori's support virtually collapsed, and a few days later he announced in a nationwide address that he would shut down the SIN and call new elections, in which he would not be a candidate. On 10 November, he won approval from Congress to hold elections on 8 April 2001.

On 13 November, Fujimori left Peru for a visit to Brunei to attend the Asia-Pacific Economic Cooperation forum. On 16 November, Valentín Paniagua took over as president of Congress after the pro-Fujimori leadership lost a vote of confidence. On 17 November, Fujimori traveled from Brunei to Tokyo, where he submitted his presidential resignation via fax. Congress refused to accept his resignation, instead voting on 22 November 62–9 to remove him from office on the grounds that he was "permanently morally disabled" and banned him from Peruvian politics for a decade.

On 19 November, government ministers presented their resignations en bloc. Fujimori's first vice president, Francisco Tudela, had broken with him and resigned a few days earlier. This left second vice president Ricardo Márquez Flores as next in line for the presidency. Congress refused to recognize him, as he was an ardent Fujimori loyalist; Márquez resigned two days later. Paniagua was next in line, and became interim president to oversee the April 2001 elections.

== Post-presidency (2000–2024) ==
=== Arrest and trial ===
Alejandro Toledo, who assumed the presidency in 2001, spearheaded the criminal case against Fujimori. He arranged meetings with the Supreme Court, tax authorities, and other powers in Peru to "coordinate the joint efforts to bring the criminal Fujimori from Japan". His vehemence in this matter at times compromised Peruvian law: forcing the judiciary and legislative system to keep guilty sentences without hearing Fujimori's defense; not providing Fujimori with representation when Fujimori was tried in absentia; and expelling pro-Fujimori congressmen from the parliament without proof of the accusations against them. Those expulsions were later reversed by the judiciary.

Congress authorized charges against Fujimori in August 2001. Fujimori was alleged to be a coauthor, along with Vladimiro Montesinos, of the death-squad killings at Barrios Altos in 1991 and La Cantuta in 1992, respectively. At the behest of Peruvian authorities, in March 2003 Interpol issued an arrest order for Fujimori on charges that included murder, kidnapping, and crimes against humanity.

In September 2003, Fujimori and several of his ministers were denounced for crimes against humanity, for allegedly having overseen forced sterilizations during his regime. In November, Congress approved an investigation of Fujimori's involvement in the airdrop of Kalashnikov rifles into the Colombian jungle in 1999 and 2000 for guerrillas of the Revolutionary Armed Forces of Colombia (FARC). Fujimori maintained he had no knowledge of the arms-trading, and blamed Montesinos. By approving the charges, Congress lifted the immunity granted to Fujimori as a former president, so that he could be criminally charged and prosecuted.

Congress also voted to support charges against Fujimori for the detention and disappearance of 67 students from the central Andean city of Huancayo and the disappearance of several residents from the northern coastal town of Chimbote during the 1990s. It also approved charges that Fujimori mismanaged millions of dollars from Japanese charities, suggesting that the millions of dollars in his bank account were far too much to have been accumulated legally.

In 2004, the Special Prosecutor established to investigate Fujimori released a report alleging that the Fujimori administration had obtained US$2 billion through graft. Most of this money came from Vladimiro Montesinos's web of corruption. The Special Prosecutor's figure of two billion dollars is considerably higher than the one arrived at by Transparency International, an NGO that studies corruption. Transparency International listed Fujimori as having embezzled an estimated US$600 million or about $861 million in 2021, which would rank seventh in the list of money embezzled by heads of government active within 1984–2004.

Fujimori dismissed the judicial proceedings underway against him as "politically motivated", citing Toledo's involvement. Fujimori established a new political party in Peru, Sí Cumple, working from Japan. He hoped to participate in the 2006 presidential elections, but in February 2004, the Constitutional Court dismissed this possibility, because the ex-president was specifically barred by Congress from holding any office for ten years. Fujimori saw the decision as unconstitutional, as did his supporters such as former congress members Luz Salgado, Martha Chávez and Fernán Altuve, who argued it was a "political" maneuver and that the only body with the authority to determine the matter was the National Elections Jury (JNE). Valentín Paniagua disagreed, suggesting that the Constitutional Court finding was binding and that "no further debate is possible".

Fujimori's Sí Cumple (roughly translated, "He Keeps His Word") received more than 10% in many country-level polls, contending with APRA for the second-place slot, but did not participate in the 2006 elections after its participation in the Alliance for the Future (initially thought as Alliance Sí Cumple) had not been allowed.

Fujimori remained in self-imposed exile in Japan, where he resided with his friend, the Catholic novelist Ayako Sono. Several senior Japanese politicians supported Fujimori, partly because of his decisive action in ending the 1996–97 Japanese embassy crisis. Peru had requested Fujimori's extradition from Japan, which was refused by the Japanese government due to Fujimori being a Japanese citizen, and Japanese laws stipulating against extraditing its citizens.

By March 2005, it appeared that Peru had all but abandoned its efforts to extradite Fujimori from Japan. In September of that year, Fujimori obtained a new Peruvian passport in Tokyo and announced his intention to run in the upcoming 2006 national election.

Fujimori arrived in Chile in November 2005, but hours after his arrival there he was arrested following an arrest warrant issued by a Chilean judge, Peru then requested his extradition. While under house arrest in Chile, Fujimori announced plans to run in Japan's Upper House elections in July 2007 for the far-right People's New Party. Fujimori was extradited from Chile to Peru in September 2007.

On 7 April 2009, a three-judge panel convicted Fujimori on charges of human rights abuses, declaring that the "charges against him have been proven beyond all reasonable doubt". The panel found him guilty of ordering the Grupo Colina death squad to commit the November 1991 Barrios Altos massacre and the July 1992 La Cantuta massacre, which resulted in the deaths of 25 people, as well as for taking part in the kidnappings of opposition journalist Gustavo Gorriti and businessman Samuel Dyer Ampudia. As of 2009 Fujimori's conviction is the only instance of a democratically elected head of state being tried and convicted of human rights abuses in his own country. Later on 7 April, the court sentenced Fujimori to 25 years in prison. Likewise, the Court found him guilty of aggravated kidnapping, under the aggravating circumstance of cruel treatment, with respect to journalist Gustavo Gorriti and businessman Samuel Dyer Ampudia. The Special Criminal Chamber determined that the sentence was to expire on 10 February 2032. On 2 January 2010, the sentence to 25 years in prison for human rights violations was confirmed.

He faced a third trial in July 2009 over allegations that he illegally gave US$15 million in state funds to Montesinos during the two months prior to his fall from power. Fujimori admitted paying the money to Montesinos but claimed that he had later paid back the money to the state. On 20 July, the court found him guilty of embezzlement and sentenced him to a further 7 1/2 years in prison.

A fourth trial took place in September 2009 in Lima. Fujimori was accused of using Montesinos to bribe and tap the phones of journalists, businessmen and opposition politicians—evidence of which led to the collapse of his government in 2000. Fujimori admitted the charges but claimed that the charges were made to damage his daughter's presidential election campaign. The prosecution asked the court to sentence Fujimori to eight years imprisonment with a fine of US$1.6 million plus US$1 million in compensation to ten people whose phones were bugged. Fujimori pleaded guilty and was sentenced to six years' imprisonment on 30 September 2009.

=== Pardon requests and release ===
Press reports in late 2012 indicated that Fujimori was suffering from tongue cancer and other medical problems. His family asked President Ollanta Humala for a pardon. President Humala rejected a pardon in 2013, saying that Fujimori's condition was not serious enough to warrant it. In July 2016, with three days left in his term, President Humala said that there was insufficient time to evaluate a second request to pardon Fujimori, leaving the decision to his successor Pedro Pablo Kuczynski. On 24 December 2017, President Kuczynski pardoned him on health grounds. Kuczynski's office stated that the hospitalized 79-year-old Fujimori had a "progressive, degenerative and incurable disease". The pardon kicked off at least two days of protests and led at least three congressmen to resign from Kuczynski's party. A spokesman for Popular Force alleged there was a pact that, in exchange for the pardon, Popular Force members helped Kuczynski fight ongoing impeachment proceedings.

On 20 February 2018, the National Criminal Chamber ruled that it did not apply the resolution that granted Fujimori the right of grace for humanitarian reasons. Therefore, the former president had to face the process for the Pativilca Case with a simple appearance. On 3 October 2018, the Peruvian Supreme Court reversed Fujimori's pardon and ordered his return to prison. He was rushed to a hospital and returned to prison on 23 January 2019. His pardon was formally annulled on 13 February 2019.

The Constitutional Court, in a 4–3 ruling on 17 March 2022, reinstated the pardon, though it was not clear if or when he might be released. Those ruling in approval of Fujimori's release argued that a pardon, no matter how unconstitutional it may be, can be issued by the President of Peru and that previous rulings annulling the pardon were "subjective". Constitutional Court judges ruling in favor of releasing Fujimori ignored the Inter-American Court of Human Rights' opinion that criticized Kuczynski's reported pardon pact with Fujimori's son and pointed out that the disease cited in the pardon was possibly diagnosed by Fujimori's personal doctor, not an independent physician.

On 8 April 2022, the Inter-American Court of Human Rights overruled the Constitutional Court and ordered Peru not to release Fujimori.

On 5 December 2023, he was ordered to be released immediately following an order by the Constitutional Court. This followed a previous order by the court that mandated the decision in the hands of a lower court in Ica, which returned the case to the Constitutional Court citing lack of authority. The following day, he was released from Barbadillo Prison in Lima, after spending 16 years in prison, whereupon he was met by his children Keiko and Kenji as well as a crowd of supporters.

=== Forced sterilizations trial ===
In May 2023, the Supreme Court of Chile ordered Fujimori to testify regarding forced sterilizations that occurred between 1996 and 2000 during his government, with Chile attempting to decide if they would expand extradition charges against Fujimori to include the sterilizations, which would allow him to be prosecuted in Peru. On 19 May 2023, Fujimori participated in a video call from Barbadillo Prison with justice officials in Chile defending his actions regarding sterilizations.

=== 2026 general election ===
Two months before his death, on 14 July 2024, Keiko Fujimori announced her father's candidacy for the 2026 Peruvian general election, despite his legal impediments and difficulties related to old age and poor health. His daughter announced her campaign following his death in October 2025, and advanced to the second round. In her fourth attempt for the presidency, Keiko Fujimori was narrowly elected president in June 2026, taking office in July.

== Personal life, illness, and death ==
Fujimori spoke Spanish, as well as Japanese and English. As President, Fujimori spoke only Spanish in public in deference to his Peruvian supporters. Nevertheless, Fujimori remained proficient in Japanese and was able to deliver a speech in his first language to the Japanese diet, during one of his official visits to Japan in March 1992. Fujimori spoke conversational English which he picked up from his time spent in Wisconsin, albeit with a Hispanic accent. In 1974, he married Susana Higuchi, also Japanese Peruvian. They had four children, including a daughter, Keiko, and a son, Kenji, who followed him into politics and were both elected to Congress. In 1994, Fujimori separated from Higuchi and formally stripped her of the title First Lady in August 1994, appointing Keiko as first lady in her stead. Higuchi publicly denounced Fujimori as a "tyrant" and claimed that his administration was corrupt. They formally divorced in 1995.

For some years before his death, Fujimori had gastrointestinal issues, heart problems and cancer. He was in prison for several years following his presidency and was released on humanitarian grounds in December 2023. He was diagnosed with tongue cancer in early 2024. He made his last public appearance at a hospital after undergoing a CT scan on 4 September 2024.

On 11 September, several Fujimorist members of congress wearing black, along with a priest, arrived at the home of Fujimori's daughter Keiko in Lima's San Borja District, amid reports that his health was failing. Subsequently, his doctor Alejandro Aguinaga told the press that he was "fighting" for his life and requested that visits be restricted. Congressperson Luisa María Cuculiza said that Fujimori's decline in health took her by surprise and that she had spoken with him five days earlier during which she noted his lucidity. Miki Torres, a spokesperson for the Popular Force, added that Fujimori was going through a "difficult time". Fujimori's lawyer, Elio Riera, briefly disconnected from a virtual meeting over concerns for his health.

Fujimori died at around 18:00 (UTC−05:00). A statement released by another doctor, José Carlos Gutiérrez, stated that Fujimori had trouble breathing on 9 September, lost consciousness on 10 September, and died from complications of tongue cancer. Keiko Fujimori later confirmed her father's death on social media.

=== State funeral and burial ===
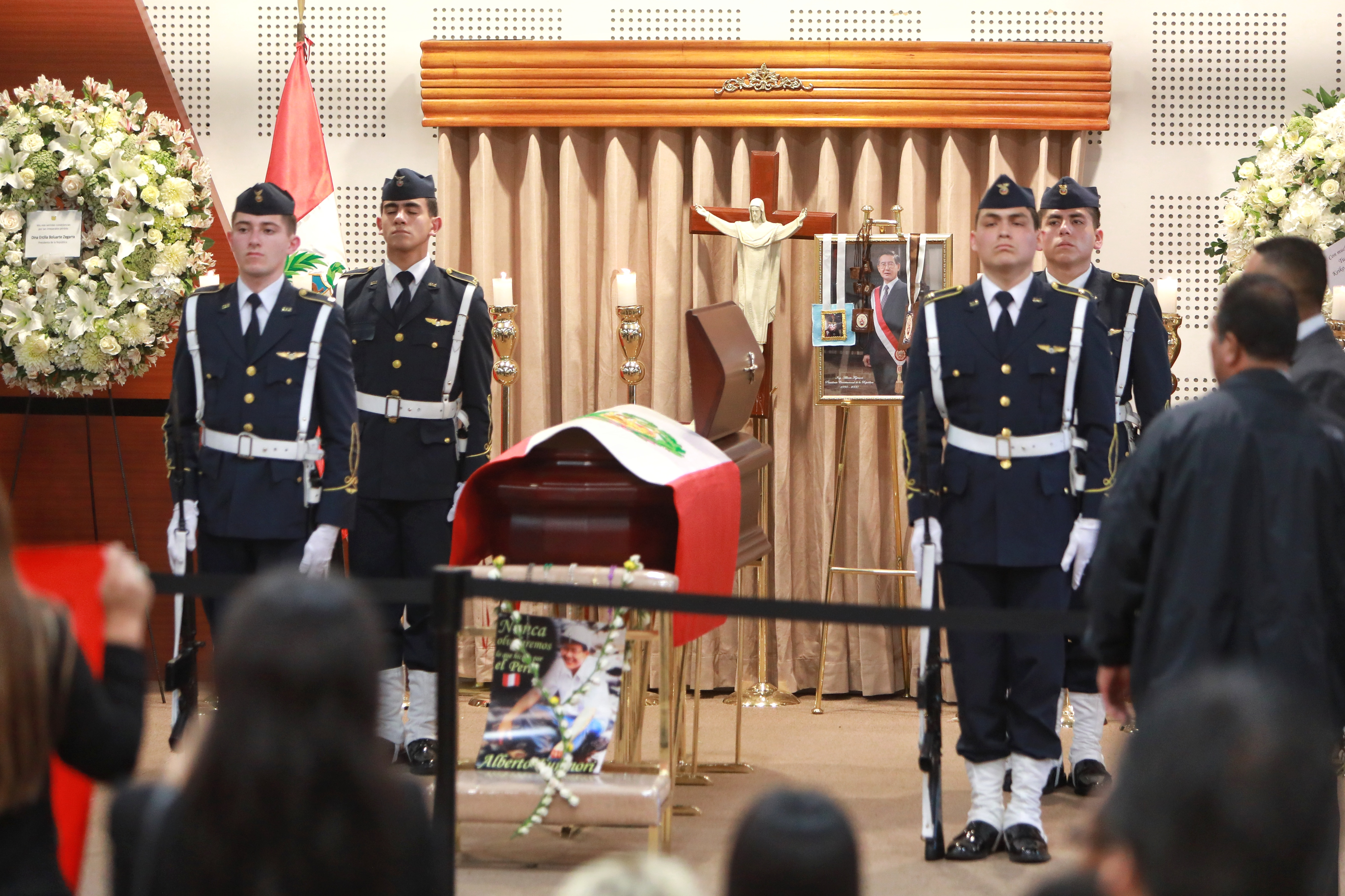
Fujimori's state funeral at Peru's Ministry of Culture headquarters.

The Peruvian government declared three days of mourning and granted him a state funeral. The Peruvian Congress and other public buildings lowered their flags to half-mast in his honor. Fujimori's remains were brought to lie in state at the Museo de la Nación in the Ministry of Culture on 12 September. Thousands of Fujimori supporters arrived from various regions of the country to the wake, carrying portraits and making speeches in his honor. Due to the large number of attendees, the Ministry of Culture announced that access to the wake would be extended until midnight, and that the following day, the doors of the Nasca Room would be open from 6 in the morning until midnight.

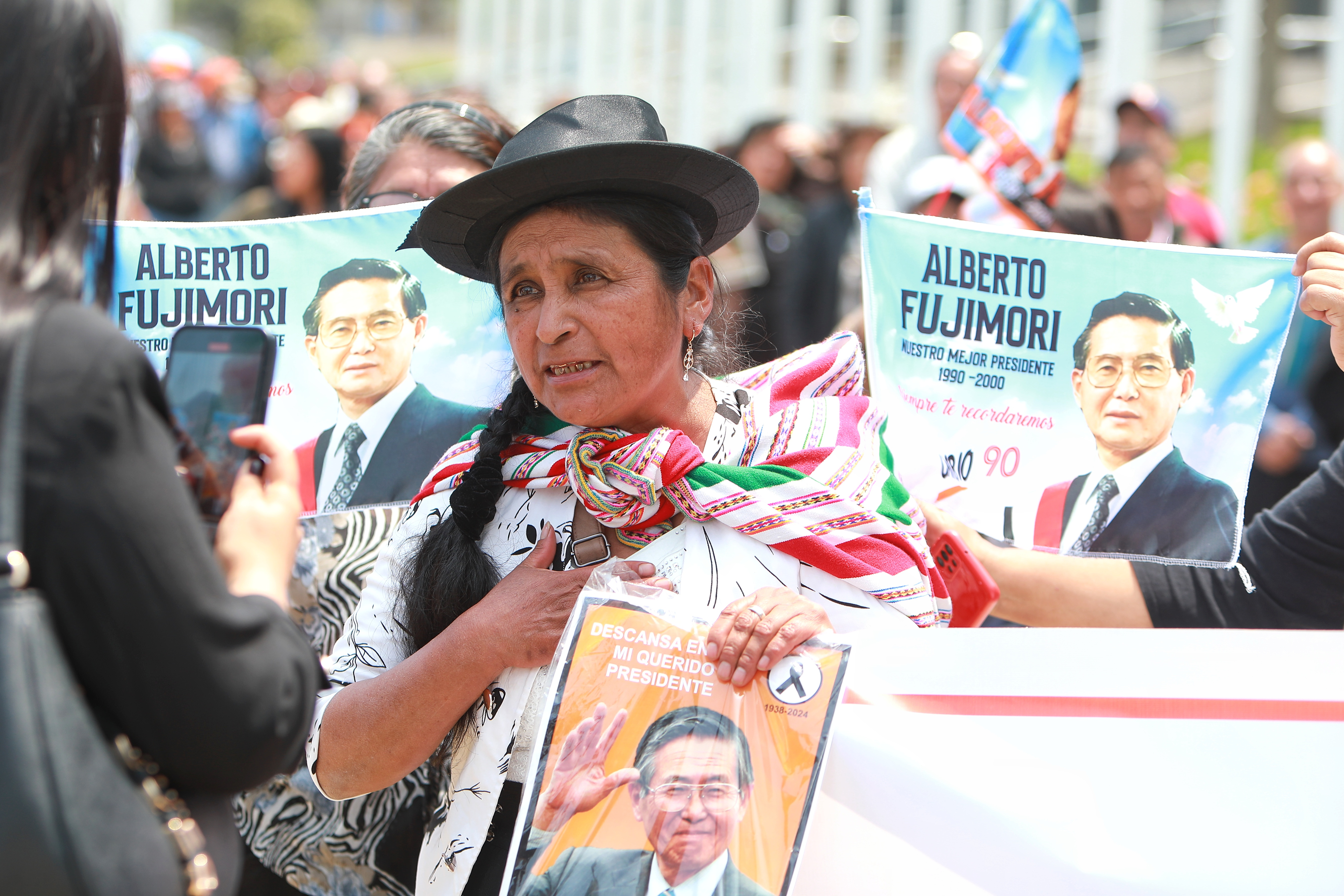
Pro-Fujimoristas mourn during at his funeral

From 12 to 14 September 2024, he lay in state at Peru's Ministry of Culture headquarters. Fujimori's state funeral was then held on 14 September 2024 at Lima's National Theatre. His funeral was attended by the incumbent president, Dina Boluarte, who offered a salute, and Keiko spoke during the funeral in front of a large portrait of her father. Fujimori is buried at Campo Fe Cemetery in Huachipa, Lima.

=== Reactions ===
President Dina Boluarte did not comment directly on his death, although her administration expressed its condolences to his family. Former presidents Francisco Sagasti, Manuel Merino, Martín Vizcarra and Pedro Pablo Kuczynski also conveyed their condolences, as well as prime minister Gustavo Adrianzén.

Supporters also gathered at Fujimori's house to mourn his death. His death in his native Peru drew mixed reactions; congressman Sigrid Bazán commented that Fujimori was a "dictator, assassin, and corrupt" and that "his legacy of corruptions, violations of human rights, and authoritarianism" would persist beyond his death.

International media described him following his death as an "authoritarian" who was "divisive", and whose "heavy handed" tactics "created a negative legacy" in Peru that frustrated his eldest daughter's attempts to be elected to the presidency. Former president of Colombia Álvaro Uribe Vélez expressed his condolences and praised his administration, saying he "rescued Peru from many problems". Jamil Mahuad, former President of Ecuador, praised Fujimori and stated that he regretted "the loss of a friend". Yoshimasa Hayashi, Chief Cabinet Secretary of Japan, expressed his condolences to Fujimori's family, citing his role in resolving the Japanese embassy hostage crisis. At the same time, he acknowledged that Fujimori had been "evaluated in various ways" in part due to his human rights abuse cases.

== Political actions ==
=== Economic policy ===
Reforms under Fujimori took place in three distinct phases: an initial "orthodox" phase (1990–92) in which technocrats dominated the reform agenda; a "pragmatic" phase (1993–98) that saw the growing influence of business elites over government priorities; and a final "watered-down" phase (1999–2000) dominated by a clique of personal loyalists and their clientelist policies that aimed to secure Fujimori a third term as president. Business was a big winner of the reforms, with its influence increasing significantly within both the state and society.

Fujimori's tenure is perhaps best defined by Fujishock, his dramatic economic stabilization program which produced significant, quantifiable improvements in Peru's economic indicators. Prior to his reforms, the country suffered from hyperinflation that, at its peak, approached levels as high as 7,500% annually, while fiscal deficits were estimated to be in the range of 8–9% of GDP, and exports were roughly US$4 billion. Following the implementation of stringent fiscal and monetary policies, deregulation, and sweeping privatizations, inflation was slashed to single-digit levels (approximately 7–10% by 1994) and fiscal deficits were reduced to around 2–3% of GDP. High growth during Fujimori's first term petered out during his second term. The 1997–98 El Niño event had a tremendous impact on the Peruvian economy during the late 1990s and exacerbated a recession during that time. Real GDP growth stabilized at an average of about 3–4% per annum during the mid-1990s, and export values soared from about US$4 billion in 1990 to over US$11 billion by 1997. Analysts state that GDP growth during the Fujimori years reflects a greater rate of extraction of nonrenewable resources by transnational companies; these companies were attracted by Fujimori by means of near-zero royalties, and, by the same fact, little of the extracted wealth has stayed in the country.

One of the hallmarks of his administration was the privatization program, through which approximately 230–250 state-owned enterprises were sold, generating an estimated US$2.5–3 billion in capital inflows. This aggressive liberalization not only bolstered investor confidence but also helped increase foreign direct investment (FDI) to roughly 1.5–2% of GDP by the late 1990s. Peru was reintegrated into the global economic system, and began to attract foreign investment. The mass selloff of state-owned enterprises led to improvements in some service industries, notably local telephone, mobile telephone, and internet services, respectively. Privatization also generated foreign investment in export-oriented activities such as mining and energy extraction, notably the Camisea Gas Project and the copper and zinc extraction projects at Antamina.

While Fujimori's policies have been credited with restoring macroeconomic stability and jumpstarting growth in a previously battered economy, they also contributed to heightened income inequality and social disparities. This is an enduring point of contention among economists and policy analysts. Critics argue that the rapid privatizations and deregulation, though successful in attracting capital, undermined public sector services and exacerbated regional imbalances. Nonetheless, the data support the conclusion that Fujimori's economic interventions achieved a rapid and measurable turnaround in key economic indicators, laying the groundwork for subsequent decades of growth in Peru.

=== Corruption ===
Fujimori was accused of a series of offenses, including embezzlement of public funds, abuse of power, and corruption during almost ten years as president (1990–2000), especially when he gained greater control after the self-coup. The network operated as a kleptocracy in three spheres: business, politics, and the military.

With multimillion-dollar annual expenditures in 1992 (five billion dollars in public spending plus another five billion in state enterprises), part of the funds were diverted to political and military institutions. According to the National Anti-Corruption Initiative (INA) in 2001, they corresponded to 30–35% of the average budget expenditure in each year, and 4% of the average annual GDP during the same period.

One of those responsible for maintaining an image of apparent honesty and government approval was Vladimiro Montesinos, head of the National Intelligence Service (SIN), who systematically bribed politicians, judges, and the media. That criminal network also involved authorities of his government; furthermore, due to privatization and the arrival of foreign capital, companies close to the Ministry of the Economy and Finance were allowed to use state money for public works tenders, as in the cases of AeroPerú, JJC Contratistas Generales (of the Camet Dickmann family), and the Banco de Crédito.

Although in 1999 the opposition made a public denunciation that ended in the resignation of five ministers, this network was later revealed in 2000, just before the president resigned, when the Swiss embassy in Peru informed the Minister of Justice Alberto Bustamante and the attorney general José Ugaz of more than US$40 million coming from Montesinos, in which he was denounced for "illicit enrichment to the detriment of the Peruvian state". Ugaz was in charge of the investigation until 2002.

According to Transparency International in 2004, Fujimori was listed as the seventh most corrupt former leader in history.

=== Counterterrorism efforts ===
When Fujimori came to power, much of Peru was dominated by the Maoist insurgent group Shining Path, and the Marxist–Leninist group Túpac Amaru Revolutionary Movement (MRTA). In 1989, 25% of Peru's district and provincial councils opted not to hold elections, owing to a persistent campaign of assassination, over the course of which over 100 officials had been killed by the Shining Path in that year alone. That same year, more than one-third of Peru's courts lacked a justice of the peace due to Shining Path intimidation. Labor union leaders and military officials were also assassinated throughout the 1980s.

Areas where Shining Path was active in Peru

By the early 1990s, some parts of the country were under the control of the insurgents, in territories known as "zonas liberadas" ("liberated zones"), where inhabitants lived under the rule of these groups and paid them taxes. When the Shining Path arrived in Lima, it organized "paros armados" ("armed strikes"), which were enforced by killings and other forms of violence. The leadership of the Shining Path largely consisted of university students and teachers. Two previous governments, those of Fernando Belaúnde Terry and Alan García, at first neglected the threat posed by the Shining Path, then launched an unsuccessful military campaign to eradicate it, undermining public faith in the state and precipitating an exodus of elites.

According to the Truth and Reconciliation Commission, Shining Path guerrilla attacks claimed an estimated 12,500 lives during the organization's active phase. On 16 July 1992, the Tarata bombing, in which several car bombs exploded in Miraflores, Lima's wealthiest district, killed over forty people; the bombings were characterized by one commentator as an "offensive to challenge President Alberto Fujimori". The bombing at Tarata was followed up with a "weeklong wave of car bombings ... Bombs hit banks, hotels, schools, restaurants, police stations, and shops ... [G]uerrillas bombed two rail bridges from the Andes, cutting off some of Peru's largest copper mines from coastal ports."

Fujimori took credit for ending the Shining Path insurgency. As part of his anti-insurgency efforts, Fujimori granted the military broad powers to arrest suspected insurgents and try them in secret military courts with few legal rights. This measure has often been criticized for compromising the fundamental democratic and human right to an open trial wherein the accused faces the accuser. Fujimori contended that these measures were both justified and also necessary. Members of the judiciary were too afraid to charge the alleged insurgents, and judges and prosecutors had very legitimate fears of reprisals against them or their families. At the same time, Fujimori's government armed rural Peruvians, organizing them into groups known as rondas campesinas ("peasant patrols").

Insurgent activity was in decline by the end of 1992, and Fujimori took credit for this abatement, claiming that his campaign had largely eliminated the insurgent threat. After the 1992 auto-coup, the intelligence work of the DIRCOTE led to the capture of the leaders from MRTA and the Shining Path, including notorious Shining Path leader Abimael Guzmán. Guzmán's capture was a political coup for Fujimori, who used it to great effect in the press; in an interview with documentarian Ellen Perry, Fujimori even noted that he specially ordered Guzmán's prison jumpsuit to be white with black stripes, to enhance the image of his capture in the news media.

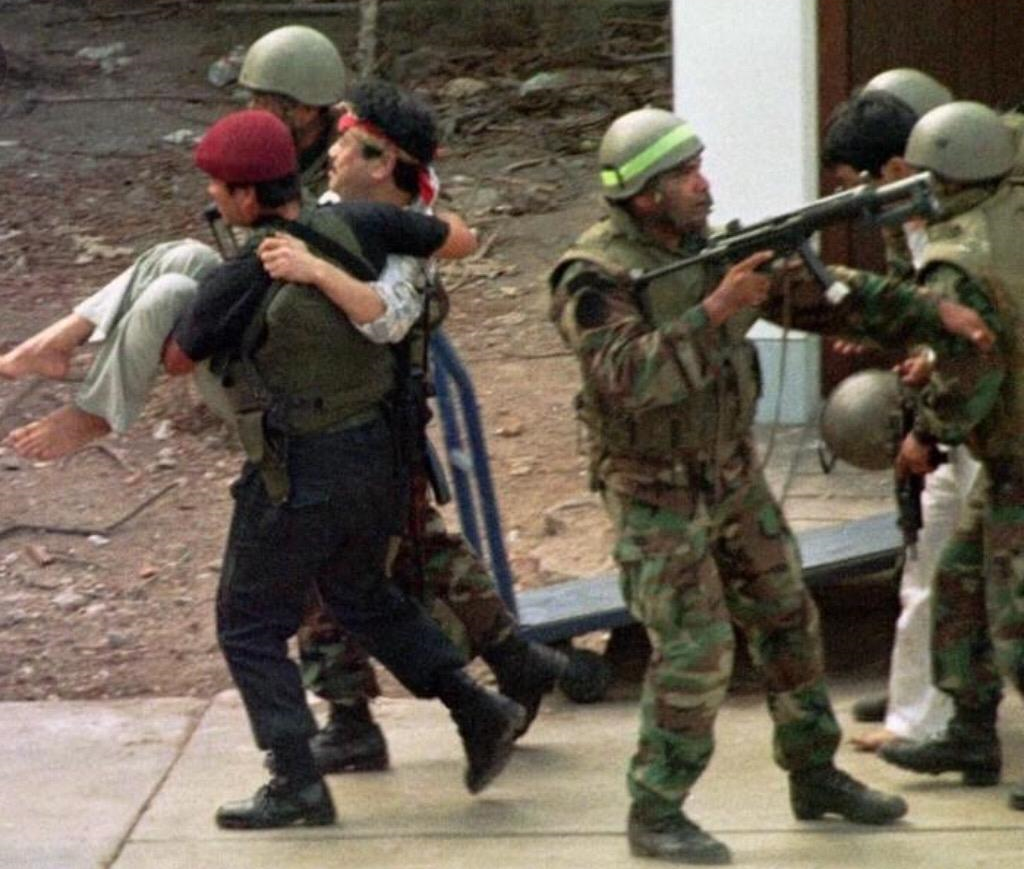
Chavín de Huántar commandos rescue a Japanese hostage on 22 April 1997.

==== Human rights violations ====
Several organizations criticized Fujimori's methods against the Shining Path and the MRTA. In efforts to defeat the Shining Path, the military engaged in widespread human rights abuses and the majority of the victims were poor highland countryside inhabitants caught in a crossfire between the military and insurgents. Thousands of innocent civilians were killed by the armed forces during the Fujimori administration. Amnesty International said "the widespread and systematic nature of human rights violations committed during the government of former head of state Alberto Fujimori (1990–2000) in Peru constitute crimes against humanity under international law". The 1992 La Cantuta massacre and the 1991 Barrios Altos massacre by members of the Grupo Colina death squad, made up solely of members of the armed forces, were among the crimes that Peru cited in its request to Japan for his extradition in 2003. The final report of the Truth and Reconciliation Commission, published on 28 August 2003, noted that the armed forces were guilty of destroying villages and murdering countryside inhabitants whom they suspected of supporting insurgents.

The Japanese embassy hostage crisis began on 17 December 1996, when fourteen MRTA militants seized the residence of the Japanese ambassador in Lima during a party, taking hostage some four hundred diplomats, government officials, and other dignitaries. The action was partly in protest of prison conditions in Peru. During the four-month stand-off, MRTA militants gradually freed all but 72 of their hostages. The government rejected the militants' demand to release imprisoned MRTA members and secretly prepared an elaborate plan to storm the residence, while stalling by negotiating with the hostage-takers. On 22 April 1997, a team of military commandos, in the operation code-named "Chavín de Huantar", raided the building. One hostage, two military commandos, and all 14 MRTA insurgents were killed in the operation. Images of President Fujimori at the ambassador's residence during and after the military operation, surrounded by soldiers and liberated dignitaries, and walking among the corpses of the insurgents, were widely televised. The conclusion of the four-month-long stand-off was used by Fujimori and his supporters to bolster his image as tough on terrorism. The success of the military operation in the Japanese embassy hostage crisis was tainted by subsequent allegations that at least three and possibly eight of the insurgents were summarily executed by the commandos after surrendering. In 2002, the case was taken up by public prosecutors, but the Supreme Court ruled that the military tribunals had jurisdiction. A military court later absolved them of guilt, and the Chavín de Huantar soldiers led the 2004 military parade. In 2003, MRTA family members lodged a complaint with the Inter-American Commission on Human Rights (IACHR) accusing the Peruvian state of human rights violations, in that the MRTA insurgents had been denied the "right to life, the right to judicial guarantees and the right to judicial protection". Although the IACHR's ruling did not directly implicate Fujimori, it did fault the Peruvian state for its complicity in the La Cantuta massacre.

==== Forced sterilizations ====
Reportedly following socioeconomic objectives calling for the "total extermination" of "culturally backward and economically impoverished groups" determined by the Peruvian military in the Plan Verde, from 1996 to 2000, the Fujimori government oversaw a massive forced sterilization campaign known as the National Program for Reproductive Health and Family Planning (PNSRPF).

According to Back and Zavala, the plan was an example of ethnic cleansing as it targeted indigenous and rural women. The Nippon Foundation, headed by Ayako Sono, a Japanese novelist and personal friend of Fujimori, supported it as well.

In the four-year Plan Verde period, over 215,000 people, mostly women, entirely indigenous, were forced or threatened into sterilization and 16,547 men were forced to undergo vasectomies during these years, most of them without a proper anesthetist, in contrast to 80,385 sterilizations and 2,795 vasectomies over the previous three years. Some scholars argue that these policies and acts were genocidal.

== Legacy ==
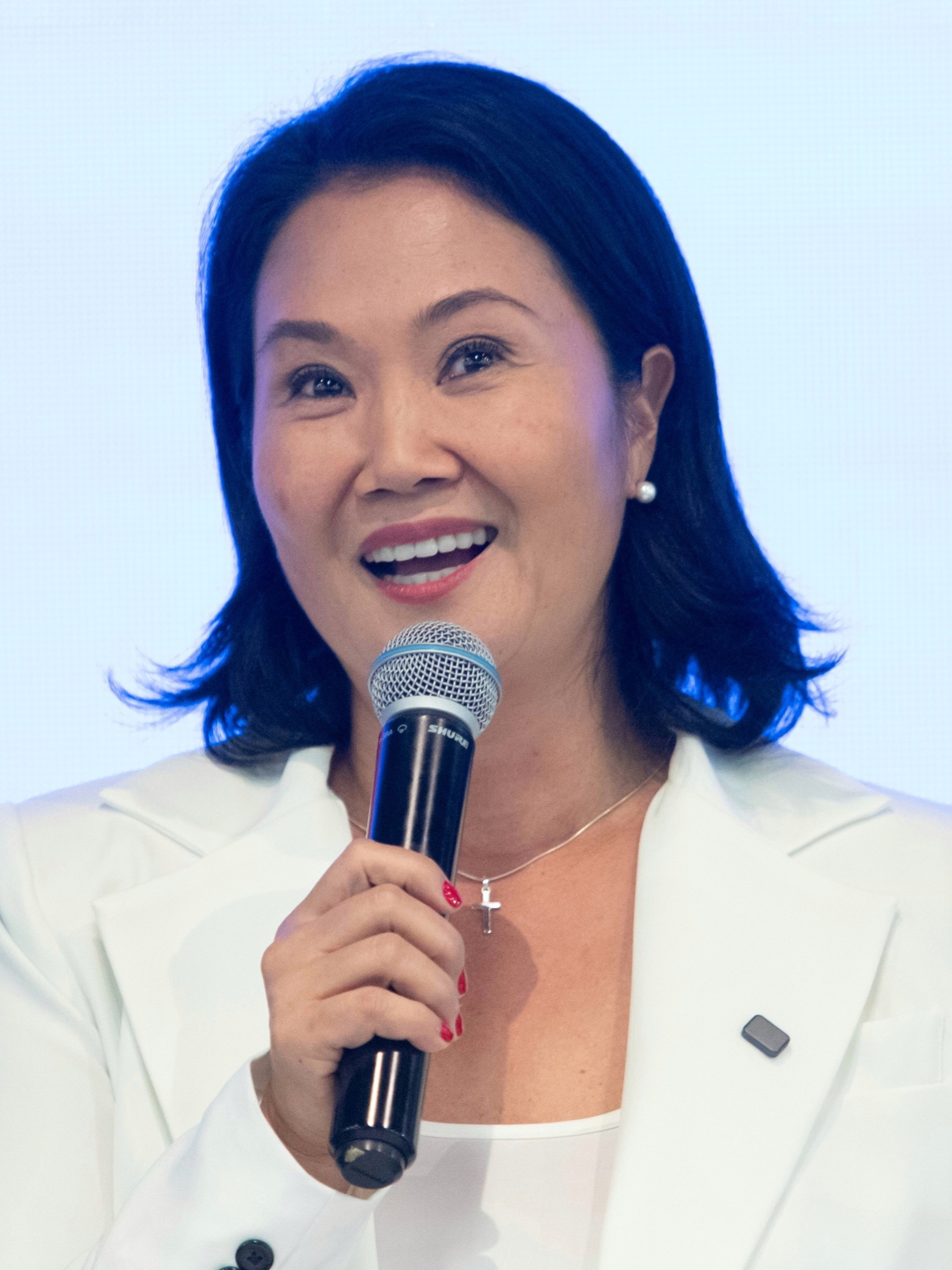
Keiko Fujimori is the daughter of former president Alberto Fujimori. She is the leading figure of Fujimorism.

Fujimori has been described as a dictator. His government was permeated by a network of corruption organized by his associate Montesinos. Fujimori's style of government has also been described as "populist authoritarianism". Numerous governments and human rights organizations such as Amnesty International, welcomed the extradition of Fujimori to face human rights charges. As early as 1991, Fujimori had himself vocally denounced what he called "pseudo-human rights organizations" such as Amnesty International and Human Rights Watch, for allegedly failing to criticize the insurgencies targeting civilian populations throughout Peru against which his government was struggling. Fujimori's style of dictatorship, in which clandestine media manipulation (including yellow journalism tactics) were prioritized over more overt forms of repression such as violent crackdowns and censorship, was described by political analysts as the world's first instance of an imagocracy. In the 2004 Global Corruption Report, Fujimori was named one of the World's Most Corrupt Leaders. He was listed seventh and he was said to have amassed $600 million.

=== Public opinion ===
Fujimori had decent support within Peru. A University of Lima March 2003 poll, taken while he was in Japan, found a 41% approval rating for his administration. A poll conducted in March 2005 by the Instituto de Desarrollo e Investigación de Ciencias Económicas (IDICE) indicated that 12.1% of the respondents intended to vote for Fujimori in the 2006 presidential election. A poll conducted on 25 November 2005, by the Universidad de Lima indicated a high approval (45.6%) rating of the Fujimori period between 1990 and 2000, attributed to his counterinsurgency efforts (53%). In a 2007 University of Lima survey of 600 Peruvians in Lima and the port of Callao, 82.6% agreed that the former president should be extradited from Chile to stand trial in Peru.

== Awards and honors ==
- Mexico: Collar of the Order of the Aztec Eagle (1996)
- Thailand: Grand Cordon (Special Class) of the Order of the White Elephant (1996)
- Austria: Grand Star of the Decoration of Honour for Services to the Republic of Austria (1997)
- United Kingdom: Honorary Knight Grand Cross of the Order of St Michael and St George (1998)
- Brazil: Grand Collar of the Order of the Southern Cross (1999)
- Malaysia: Honorary Recipient of the Order of the Crown of the Realm (1996)

== See also ==
- History of Peru
- Peruvian internal conflict
- Japanese Peruvians
- Judiciary reform in Peru under Alberto Fujimori
- List of presidents of Peru
- Politics of Peru
- Peruvian national election, 2006
- Vladimiro Montesinos

== Bibliography ==
- Kimura, Rei (1998). Alberto Fujimori of Peru: The President Who Dared to Dream (2nd ed.). Beekman Books Inc. ISBN 9781139194877.

Party political offices
New political party	Cambio 90 nominee for President of Peru; 1990, 1995, 2000	Vacant Title next held by Martha Chávez
New political party	Vamos Vecino nominee for President of Peru; 2000	Succeeded by Carlos Boloña
New political alliance	Cambio 90 – New Majority nominee for President of Peru; 1995, 2000	Vacant Title next held by Martha Chávez
New political alliance	Peru 2000 nominee for President of Peru; 2000	Alliance dissolved
Political offices
Preceded by Alan García	President of Peru; 1990–1992	Succeeded by Valentín Paniagua
Preceded by Alan García	President of the Emergency and National Reconstruction Government of Peru; 1992–1993	Succeeded by Valentín Paniagua
Preceded by Alan García	President of Peru; 1993–2000	Succeeded by Valentín Paniagua
