= Alfonso Bustamante =

Peruvian businessman and politician

José Alfonso Ernesto Bustamante y Bustamante (born 12 November 1941 in Arequipa) is a Peruvian businessman and politician. He served as Prime Minister of Peru from 1993 to 1994 during the presidency of Alberto Fujimori.

== Biography ==
Son of Juan Antonio Bustamante de la Fuente and Carmen Bustamante Tamayo, he is the nephew of President José Luis Bustamante y Rivero.

He entered the La Molina National Agrarian University, where he graduated in Agricultural Engineering. He did graduate studies at the University of Michigan in Ann Arbor.

He began venturing into family-type businesses, in the agricultural sector. After the Agrarian Reform implemented in the 1970s, he ventured together with a group of businessmen in the metalworking industry. He was president of the Chamber of Commerce and Industry of Arequipa (1979-1980).

In the first government of Alberto Fujimori, he was invited to preside over the ministerial cabinet, a choice undoubtedly due to his profile as a leader of the business union. He accepted the challenge and on August 28, 1993, he was sworn in as President of the Council of Ministers and Minister of Industry, Tourism, Integration and International Trade Negotiations. His time in politics was brief, since he resigned on February 17, 1994. He later said that the reason for his resignation was because he did not agree that those involved in the La Cantuta massacre should be tried in the military jurisdiction, and not in the civilian, as it corresponded to them.

He returned to business activity. He was Chairman of the Board of Banco del Sur, then Banco Santander Central Hispano (1994 to 2000) and Chairman of the Association of Banks of Peru (1995-1997).

In 1998, he was appointed Chairman of the Board of Telefónica del Perú to replace the Spanish official Manuel García y García, a position he held until January 2003, being replaced by Javier Nadal Ariño. Later he went on to chair the Fundación Telefónica del Perú.

He has also been Chairman of the Board of Emerit Internacional SA, Chairman of the Board of Sociedad Andina de Inversiones, Chairman of the Board of Sociedad Ganadera del Sur SA, Director of La Positiva Seguros y Reaseguros SA, Director of Empresa Eléctrica de Piura SA, Director of Indeco SA.
