= Presidency of Dina Boluarte =

Peruvian presidential administration from 2022–2025

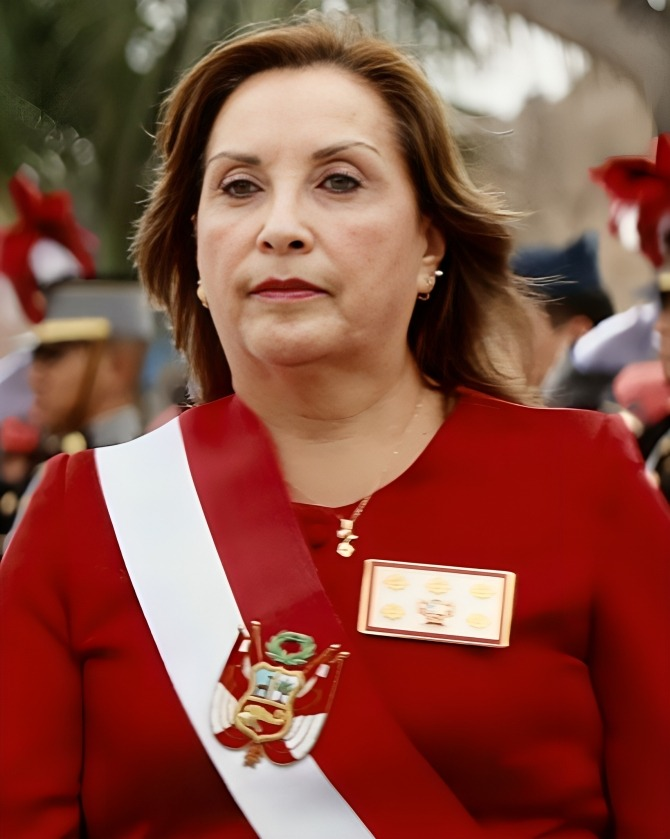
- Presidency of Dina Boluarte; 7 December 2022 – 10 October 2025
- Prime Minister: Pedro Angulo Arana; Alberto Otárola; Gustavo Adrianzén; Eduardo Arana Ysa
- Cabinet: See list
- Party: Independent
- Election: 2021
- Seat: Government Palace (Peru)

The presidency of Dina Boluarte began with her inauguration as the president of Peru on 7 December 2022, immediately following the removal of Pedro Castillo from office in the aftermath of his attempted self-coup. On 10 October 2025, Boluarte was impeached by Congress.

== Background ==
The formation of this government came three days after the investiture of Dina Boluarte as President of the Republic after the attempted self-coup by Pedro Castillo that occurred the same morning. From her speech as the new president, she declared "to ask for a political truce to install a government of national unity".

== History ==
=== First negotiations ===
As of 8 December, President Dina Boluarte announced that she will meet with all the parliamentary groups, being herself a president without a label, and therefore without any party or group supporting her continuously in Congress to form a political government.

Nevertheless, it meets most of the parliamentary groups of the center and the right, in particular Popular Force, Go on Country, Popular Renewal, Popular Action, Integrity and Development and the left group of Together for Peru.

According to deputies from Free Peru, President Dina Boluarte offered her former party a place in the government, which the parliamentarians refused. A few hours later, party leader Vladimir Cerrón confirmed that the party refuses to join the government and refuses the convocation of the group by the president, it is the only group that refused the invitation, demonstrating the still continuous support for Pedro Castillo and destroyed relations with Boluarte.

All the parliamentary groups, and especially the center and the right, announce that they will not join the government, all preferring a technical government of national unity, and especially on the left, demanding the calling of a snap general election.

=== Pro-Castillo protests ===
Nevertheless, the parliamentary groups agree on the need to quickly appoint a unity government, in an attempt to calm the protests in the street. Because from the appointment of Dina Boluarte, about a thousand people marched in Lima towards the Congress.

Other demonstrators also blocked the Panamericana highway the same day with rocks, logs, and burning tires to demand general elections and the closure of Congress, as Pedro Castillo wanted.

In Ica, several dozen demonstrators paralyzed the transport of passengers and freight vehicles. In Arequipa, a thousand kilometers south of Lima, there were also blockages on the Panamericana Sur highway.

Street mobilizations were also reported in other parts of the interior of Peru such as Chota (Cajamarca, birthplace of Castillo), Trujillo, Puno, Ayacucho, Huancavelica and Moquegua.

== Cabinets of the Boluarte presidency ==
=== Angulo cabinet ===
Angulo Cabinet
- Cabinet of Peru
- 2022
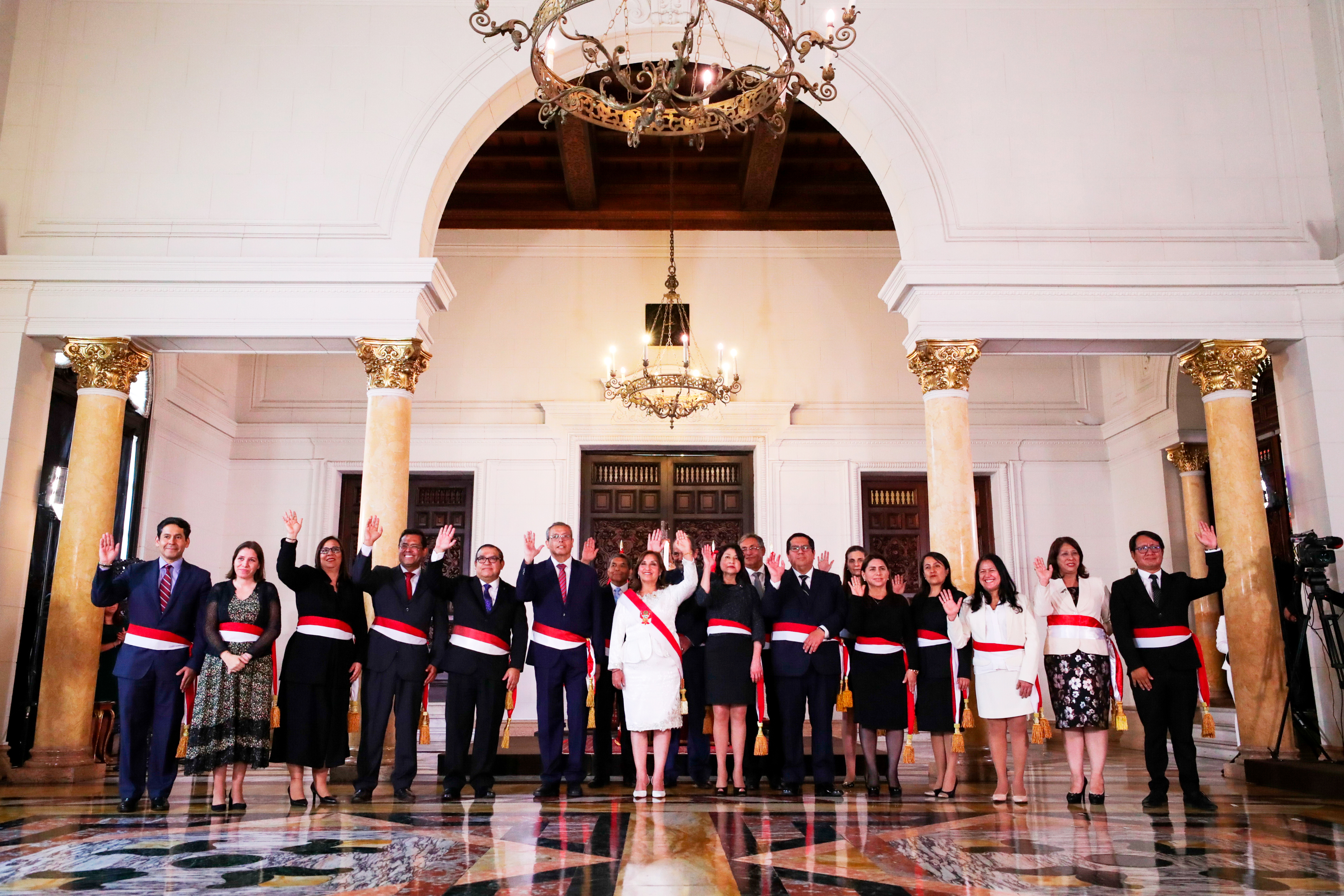
- Cabinet of Pedro Angulo
- Date formed: 10 December 2022
- Date dissolved: 21 December 2022

People and organisations
- President of the Republic: Dina Boluarte
- President of the Council of Ministers: Pedro Angulo
- No. of ministers: 19
- Member party: Non-partisan (18); Peru First (1)

History
- Legislature term: 2021–2026
- Predecessor: Chávez Cabinet
- Successor: Otárola Cabinet

On 10 December 2022, President Dina Boluarte appointed Pedro Angulo Arana to be her first President of the Council of Ministers. Angulo held the office until a cabinet reshuffle on 21 December 2022, leaving office after just eleven days.

==== First rumors about the chairman of the Council ====
If the government will therefore not be political, Dina Boluarte must therefore find independent politicians, withdrawn from political life and above all experienced. The first media rumors refer to the appointment of Jorge Nieto as President of the Council of Ministers, an experienced minister from the time of the presidency of Pedro Pablo Kuczynski.

While the Minister is experienced, he is nevertheless not independent, but with a brand new centrally located party called the Party of Good Government (PBG) which does not yet have representation in Congress, which could only slightly annoy the groups in parliament.

The other two rumors mentioned would be the appointment of Alberto Otárola, former Minister of Defense during the era of the presidency of Ollanta Humala, or the current mediator of Peru Walter Gutiérrez.

==== Announcement and composition ====
On 9 December, President Dina Boluarte announces that the composition of her government will be finalized in the evening, and announced on Saturday morning, 10 December, before noon.

Finally, the government investiture ceremony takes place at 1 p.m., and the president decides to appoint the lawyer Pedro Angulo. In the government, eight women are appointed, which is more than in all of Pedro Castillo's five governments, and the ministers belong or have belonged to a political party, but who have no parliamentary representation. The cabinet is therefore a technical government.

In addition, President Dina Boluarte has not yet decided on the Ministers of Labour and Transport, the portfolios that were most criticized and used for corruption in Castillo's government.

==== Changes in December 2022 ====
On 13 December, three days after the formation of the government, President Dina Boluarte announces the appointment of the Ministers of Labour and Transport, Eduardo García and Paola Lazarte.

On 16 December, the sixth day of government, the two Ministers of Education and Culture Patricia Correa and Jair Pérez announced their resignation, in opposition to the outbreak of the state of emergency in the country and the numerous deaths during the demonstrations in favor of Pedro Castillo, whose death toll worsened the same day, with 18 dead, confirmed by the Minister of Health Rosa Gutiérrez.

==== List of Angulo's ministers ====
Portfolio	Minister	Took office	Left office	Party
President of the Council of Ministers	Pedro Angulo Arana	10 December 2022	21 December 2022	Independent
Ministry of Foreign Affairs	Ana Gervasi	10 December 2022	21 December 2022	Independent
Ministry of Defence	Alberto Otárola	10 December 2022	21 December 2022	Independent
Ministry of Economy and Finance	Alex Contreras Miranda	10 December 2022	21 December 2022	Independent
Ministry of the Interior	César Cervantes Cárdenas	10 December 2022	21 December 2022	Independent
Ministry of Justice and Human Rights	José Andrés Tello Alfaro	10 December 2022	21 December 2022	Independent
Ministry of Education	Patricia Correra Arangotia	10 December 2022	21 December 2022	Independent
Ministry of Health	Rosa Gutiérrez Palomino	10 December 2022	21 December 2022	Peru First
Ministry of Agriculture Development and Irrigation	Nelly Paredes del Castillo	10 December 2022	21 December 2022	Independent
Ministry of Labour and Promotion of Employment	Eduardo García Birimisa	13 December 2022	21 December 2022	Independent
Ministry of Production	Sandra Belaúnde Arnillas	10 December 2022	21 December 2022	Independent
Ministry of Foreign Trade and Tourism	Luis Fernando Elguero González	10 December 2022	21 December 2022	Independent
Ministry of Energy and Mines	Óscar Vera Gargurevich	10 December 2022	21 December 2022	Independent
Ministry of Transportation and Communications	Paola Lazarte Castillo	13 December 2022	21 December 2022	Independent
Ministry of Housing, Construction and Sanitation	Hania Pérez de Cuéllar Lubienska	10 December 2022	21 December 2022	Independent
Minister of Women and Vulnerable Populations	Grecia Rojas Ortiz	10 December 2022	21 December 2022	Independent
Ministry of Environment	Albina Ruiz Ríos	10 December 2022	21 December 2022	Independent
Ministry of Culture	Jair Pérez Bráñez	10 December 2022	21 December 2022	Independent
Ministry of Development and Social Inclusion	Julio Demartini Montes	10 December 2022	21 December 2022	Independent

=== Otárola cabinet ===
Otárola Cabinet
- Cabinet of Peru
- 2022–2024
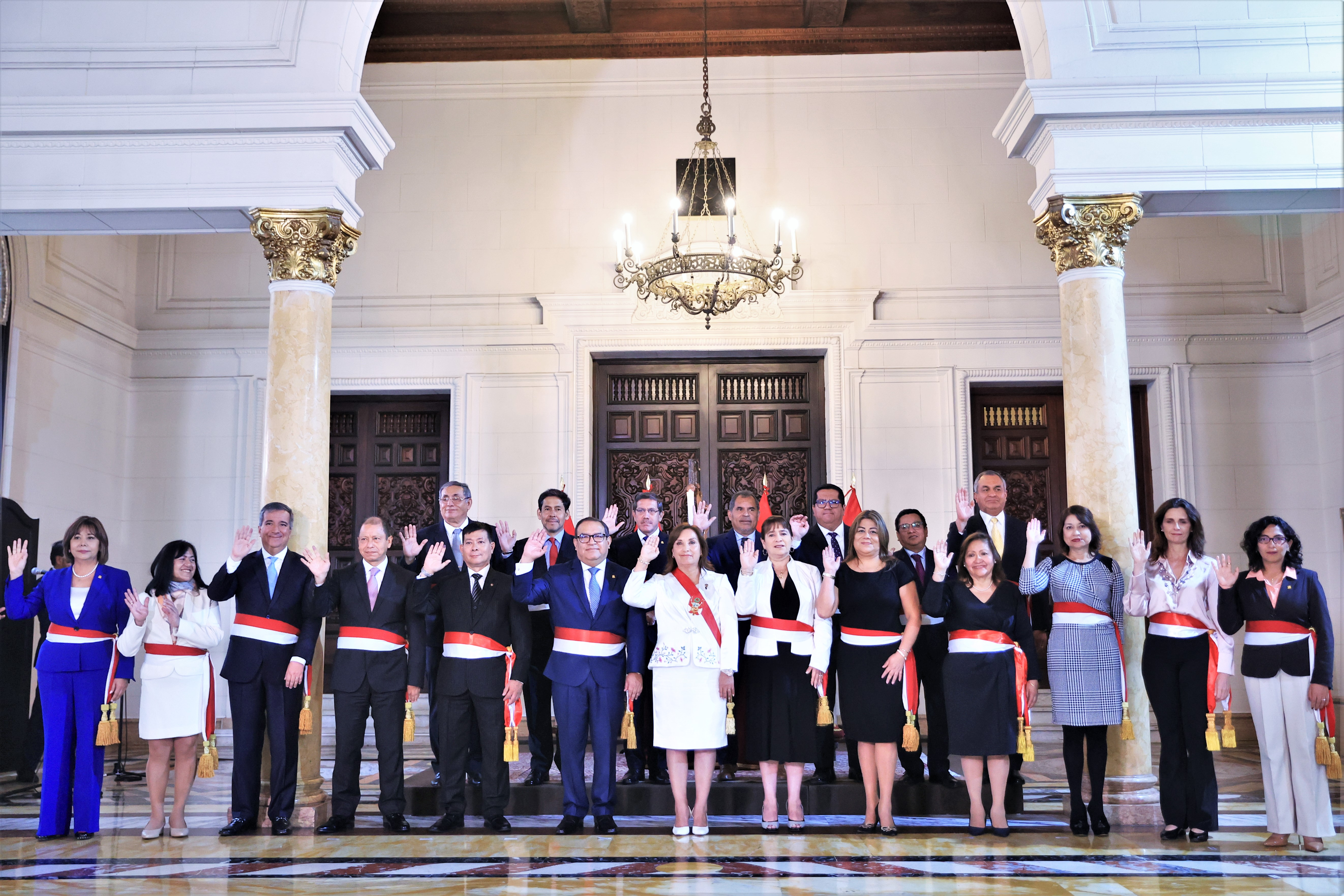
- Cabinet of Alberto Otárola
- Date formed: 21 December 2022
- Date dissolved: 5 March 2024

People and organisations
- President of the Republic: Dina Boluarte
- President of the Council of Ministers: Alberto Otárola
- No. of ministers: 19
- Member party: Non-partisan (17); Alliance for Progress (1); Peru First (1)

History
- Legislature term: 2021–2026
- Predecessor: Angulo Cabinet
- Successor: Adrianzén Cabinet

On 21 December 2022, President Dina Boluarte conducted a reshuffle of her cabinet, appointing defence minister Alberto Otárola as prime minister. In addition to the prime minister, Boluarte appointed new Ministers of the Interior, Defense, Education, and Culture.

As a former defence minister, Alberto Otárola took a hard-line approach to protest movements and was accused of being behind the death of protestors during the Juliaca massacre. Otárola flatly rejected demands for Boluarte's resignation and repeatedly accusing former president Castillo of causing the ongoing political crisis.

==== Reshuffle of January 2023 ====
On 12 January 2023, Eduardo García (Minister of Labour) submitted his resignation due to the deaths in the protests that resumed on 4 January 2023. Along the same lines, Grecia Rojas Ortiz (Minister of Women and Vulnerable Populations) would take the same position on 13 January 2023.

On that day, Boluarte swore in Luis Adrianzén and Nancy Tolentino as ministers of Labour and Women, respectively. Vicente Romero Fernández has been added to the Interior portfolio.

==== Resignation of the Minister of Education ====
In September 2023, Magnet Márquez resigned from the position after opposing the approval of a bill to 14 thousand interim teachers, not counting pedagogical qualifications, in the appointment of the country's education system. Otárola denied that he was involved in the resignation.

==== Censure of the Minister of the Interior ====
On 15 November 2023, the Minister of the Interior, Vicente Romero, was censured by Congress following the failure of the state of emergency and the so-called "Boluarte Plan."

==== Resignation of Alberto Otárola ====
On 5 March 2024, Otarola resigned as prime minister after the television program Panorama released recordings of his alleged conversations with a 25-year old woman named Yazire Pinedo, who had landed two contracts with a total worth of $14,000 to do archive and administrative work for the government. One of the recordings was said to have shown Otarola referring to Pinedo as "my love". However, in his resignation statement, he denied allegations of wrongdoing. Pinedo said the leaked conversations dated back from before Otarola's premiership in 2021, but acknowledged that she had a brief "perhaps sentimental relationship" with him.

==== List of Otárola's ministers ====
Portfolio	Minister	Took office	Left office	Party
President of the Council of Ministers	Alberto Otárola	21 December 2022	6 March 2024	Independent
Ministry of Foreign Affairs	Ana Gervasi	21 December 2022	6 November 2023	Independent
Ministry of Foreign Affairs	Javier González Olaechea	7 November 2023	3 September 2024	Christian People's Party
Ministry of Defence	Jorge Chávez Cresta	21 December 2022	13 February 2024	Independent
Ministry of Defence	Walter Astudillo	13 February 2024	6 March 2024	Independent
Ministry of Economy and Finance	Alex Contreras Miranda	21 December 2022	13 February 2024	Independent
Ministry of Economy and Finance	José Arista Arbildo	13 February 2024	6 March 2024	Independent
Ministry of the Interior	Víctor Rojas Herrera	21 December 2022	13 January 2023	Independent
Ministry of the Interior	Vicente Romero Fernández	13 January 2023	21 November 2023	Independent
Ministry of the Interior	Víctor Torres Falcón	21 November 2023	6 March 2024	Independent
Ministry of Justice and Human Rights	José Andrés Tello Alfaro	21 December 2022	23 April 2023	Independent
Ministry of Justice and Human Rights	Daniel Maurate Romero	23 April 2023	6 September 2023	Independent
Ministry of Justice and Human Rights	Eduardo Arana Ysa	6 September 2023	6 March 2024	Independent
Ministry of Education	Óscar Becerra Tresierra	21 December 2022	23 April 2023	Independent
Ministry of Education	Magnet Márquez Ramírez	23 April 2023	6 September 2023	Independent
Ministry of Education	Miriam Ponce Vértiz	6 September 2023	6 March 2024	Independent
Ministry of Health	Rosa Gutiérrez Palomino	21 December 2022	15 June 2023	Peru First
Ministry of Health	César Vásquez Sánchez	15 June 2023	6 March 2024	Alliance for Progress
Ministry of Agriculture Development and Irrigation	Nelly Paredes del Castillo	21 December 2022	6 September 2023	Independent
Ministry of Agriculture Development and Irrigation	Jennifer Contreras Álvarez	6 September 2023	6 March 2024	Independent
Ministry of Labour and Promotion of Employment	Eduardo García Birimisa	21 December 2022	13 January 2023	Independent
Ministry of Labour and Promotion of Employment	Luis Alberto Adrianzén Ojeda	13 January 2023	23 April 2023	Independent
Ministry of Labour and Promotion of Employment	Fernando Varela Bohórquez	23 April 2023	6 September 2023	Independent
Ministry of Labour and Promotion of Employment	Daniel Maurate Romero	6 September 2023	6 March 2024	Independent
Ministry of Production	Sandra Belaúnde Arnillas	21 December 2022	25 January 2023	Independent
Ministry of Production	Raúl Pérez-Reyes	26 January 2023	6 September 2023	Independent
Ministry of Production	Ana María Choquehuanca	6 September 2023	6 March 2024	Independent
Ministry of Foreign Trade and Tourism	Luis Fernando Elguero González	21 December 2022	23 April 2023	Independent
Ministry of Foreign Trade and Tourism	Juan Carlos Mathews Salazar	23 April 2023	6 March 2024	Independent
Ministry of Energy and Mines	Óscar Vera Gargurevich	21 December 2022	13 February 2024	Independent
Ministry of Energy and Mines	Rómulo Mucho Mamani	13 February 2024	6 March 2024	Modern Peru
Ministry of Transportation and Communications	Paola Lazarte Castillo	21 December 2022	6 September 2023	Independent
Ministry of Transportation and Communications	Raúl Pérez-Reyes	6 September 2023	6 March 2024	Independent
Ministry of Housing, Construction and Sanitation	Hania Pérez de Cuéllar Lubienska	21 December 2022	6 March 2024	Independent
Minister of Women and Vulnerable Populations	Grecia Rojas Ortiz	21 December 2022	13 January 2023	Independent
Minister of Women and Vulnerable Populations	Nancy Tolentino Gamarra	13 January 2023	6 March 2024	Independent
Ministry of Environment	Albina Ruiz Ríos	21 December 2022	13 February 2024	Independent
Ministry of Environment	Juan Castro Vargas	13 February 2024	6 March 2024	Independent
Ministry of Culture	Leslie Urteaga	21 December 2022	6 March 2024	Independent
Ministry of Development and Social Inclusion	Julio Demartini Montes	21 December 2022	6 March 2024	Independent

=== Adrianzén cabinet ===
Adrianzén Cabinet
- Cabinet of Peru
- 2024–2025
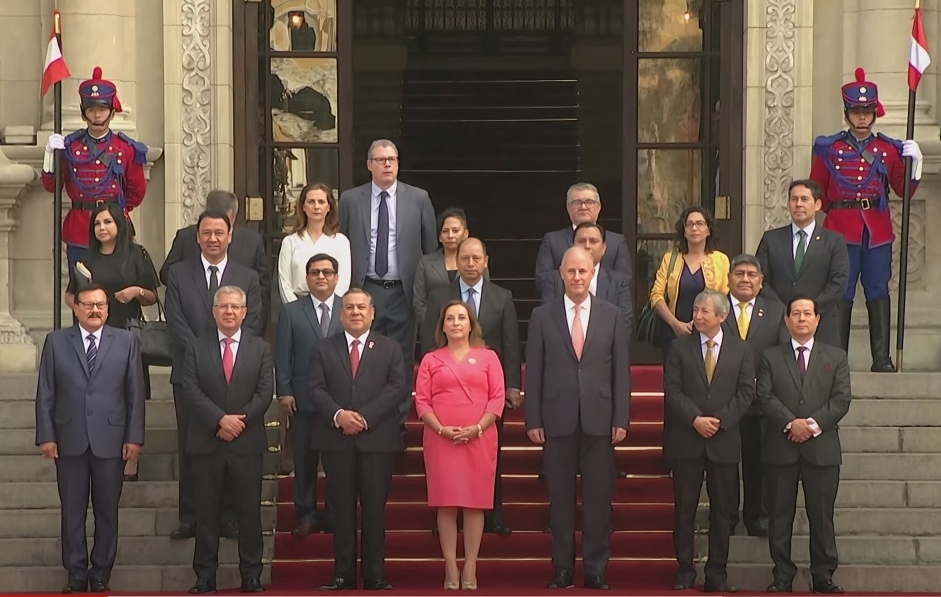
- Cabinet of Gustavo Adrianzén
- Date formed: 6 March 2024
- Date dissolved: 13 May 2025

People and organisations
- President of the Republic: Dina Boluarte
- President of the Council of Ministers: Gustavo Adrianzén
- No. of ministers: 19
- Member party: At formation: Non-partisan (18); Alliance for Progress (1); At dissolution: Non-partisan (15); Alliance for Progress (2); Popular Action (1); Citizens for Peru (1)

History
- Legislature term: 2021–2026
- Predecessor: Otárola Cabinet
- Successor: Arana Cabinet

On 6 March 2024, Gustavo Adrianzén was sworn in as the new president of the council of ministers of the Republic of Peru by President Dina Boluarte, replacing Alberto Otárola, who resigned the day before due to a scandal involving the release of audio recordings with a young woman. Gustavo Adrianzén became the third prime minister of Boluarte's presidency and was the second longest serving prime minister during her tenure.

==== Resignation of Ministers ====
On 1 April 2024, Interior Minister Víctor Torres submitted his resignation to President Dina Boluarte, followed by the Ministers of Women and Education. That day, the president swore in six new ministers, including those in charge of the portfolios of Agrarian Development, Production, and Foreign Trade.

On 16 May 2024, Interior Minister Walter Ortiz Acosta resigned and was replaced that day by Juan José Santiváñez.

==== Reshuffle of September 2024 ====
On 3 September 2024, President Dina Boluarte conducted a ministerial reshuffle and appointed new ministers of Foreign Affairs, Housing, Culture, and Foreign Trade, after criticism and questions arose regarding the ministers of various portfolios. The cabinet only has two women, the lowest number in the government.

==== Censure of the Minister of Energy and Mines ====
On 26 November 2024, the Congress of the Republic of Peru decided to censure the Minister of Energy and Mines, Rómulo Mucho, following a series of protests by miners demanding his registration with the Comprehensive Registry of Mining Training (Reinfo).

==== Reshuffle of January 2025 ====
On 31 January 2025, President Dina Boluarte announced the replacement of three ministers, who had been facing media questioning. The questioned José Arista (Economy and Finance) and Julio Demartini (Development and Social Inclusion) were replaced by José Salardi and Leslie Urteaga, respectively. Additionally, Fanny Montellanos took office as head of the Ministry of Women and Vulnerable Populations.

==== Censure of the Minister of the Interior ====
On 21 March 2025, the Congress of the Republic censured the Minister of the Interior, Juan José Santiváñez, for his inability to combat the rising crime rate in the country.

==== End of the Cabinet ====
On 13 May 2025, the head of state swore in new ministers for the Economy, Interior, and Transportation portfolios. Hours later, Prime Minister Gustavo Adrianzén resigned in anticipation of impending Congressional censure.

==== List of Adrianzén's ministers ====
Portfolio	Minister	Took office	Left office	Party
President of the Council of Ministers	Gustavo Adrianzén	6 March 2024	14 May 2025	Independent
Ministry of Foreign Affairs	Javier González Olaechea	6 March 2024	3 September 2024	Christian People's Party
Ministry of Foreign Affairs	Elmer Schialer	3 September 2024	14 May 2025	Independent
Ministry of Defence	Walter Astudillo	6 March 2024	14 May 2025	Independent
Ministry of Economy and Finance	José Arista Arbildo	6 March 2024	31 January 2025	Independent
Ministry of Economy and Finance	José Salardi	31 January 2025	13 May 2025	Independent
Ministry of Economy and Finance	Raúl Pérez-Reyes	13 May 2025	14 May 2025	Independent
Ministry of the Interior	Víctor Torres Falcón	6 March 2024	1 April 2024	Independent
Ministry of the Interior	Walter Ortiz Acosta	1 April 2024	16 May 2024	Independent
Ministry of the Interior	Juan Santiváñez Antúnez	16 May 2024	24 March 2025	Independent
Ministry of the Interior	Julio Díaz Zulueta	24 March 2025	13 May 2025	Independent
Ministry of Justice and Human Rights	Eduardo Arana Ysa	6 March 2024	14 May 2025	Independent
Ministry of Education	Miriam Ponce Vértiz	6 March 2024	1 April 2024	Independent
Ministry of Education	Morgan Quero Gaime	1 April 2024	14 May 2025	Citizens for Peru
Ministry of Health	César Vásquez Sánchez	6 March 2024	14 May 2025	Alliance for Progress
Ministry of Agriculture Development and Irrigation	Jennifer Contreras Álvarez	6 March 2024	1 April 2024	Independent
Ministry of Agriculture Development and Irrigation	Ángel Manero Campos	1 April 2024	14 May 2025	Independent
Ministry of Labour and Promotion of Employment	Daniel Maurate Romero	6 March 2024	14 May 2025	Independent
Ministry of Production	Ana María Choquehuanca	6 March 2024	1 April 2024	Independent
Ministry of Production	Sergio González Guerrero	1 April 2024	14 May 2025	Independent
Ministry of Foreign Trade and Tourism	Juan Carlos Mathews Salazar	6 March 2024	1 April 2024	Independent
Ministry of Foreign Trade and Tourism	Elizabeth Galdo Marín	1 April 2024	3 September 2024	Go on Country
Ministry of Foreign Trade and Tourism	Úrsula León Chempén	3 September 2024	14 May 2025	Independent
Ministry of Energy and Mines	Rómulo Mucho Mamani	6 March 2024	27 November 2024	Modern Peru
Ministry of Energy and Mines	Jorge Montero Cornejo	30 November 2024	14 May 2025	Popular Action
Ministry of Transportation and Communications	Raúl Pérez-Reyes	6 March 2024	13 May 2025	Independent
Ministry of Housing, Construction and Sanitation	Hania Pérez de Cuéllar Lubienska	6 March 2024	3 September 2024	Independent
Ministry of Housing, Construction and Sanitation	Durich Whittembury Talledo	3 September 2024	14 May 2025	Independent
Minister of Women and Vulnerable Populations	Nancy Tolentino Gamarra	6 March 2024	1 April 2024	Independent
Minister of Women and Vulnerable Populations	Ángela Hernández Cajo	1 April 2024	14 May 2025	Independent
Minister of Women and Vulnerable Populations	Ángela Hernández Cajo	14 May 2025	13 October 2025	Independent
Ministry of Environment	Juan Castro Vargas	6 March 2024	14 May 2025	Independent
Ministry of Culture	Leslie Urteaga	6 March 2024	3 September 2024	Independent
Ministry of Culture	Fabricio Valencia Gibaja	3 September 2024	14 May 2025	Independent
Ministry of Development and Social Inclusion	Julio Demartini Montes	6 March 2024	31 January 2025	Independent
Ministry of Development and Social Inclusion	Leslie Urteaga	31 January 2025	14 May 2025	Independent

=== Arana cabinet ===
Arana Cabinet
- Cabinet of Peru
- 2025
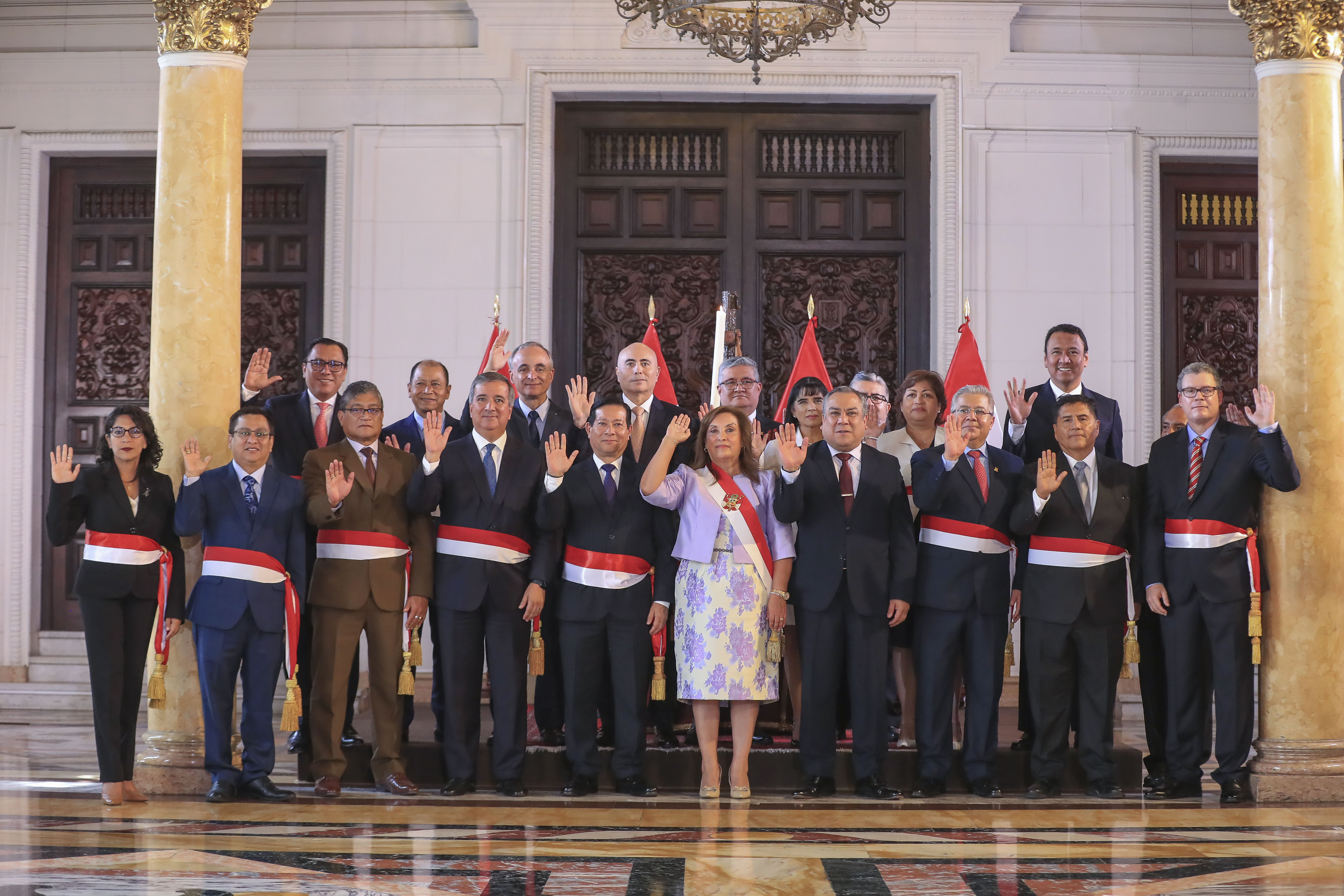
- Cabinet of Eduardo Arana Ysa
- Date formed: 14 May 2025
- Date dissolved: 13 October 2025

People and organisations
- President of the Republic: Dina Boluarte; José Jeri
- President of the Council of Ministers: Eduardo Arana Ysa
- No. of ministers: 19
- Member party: Non-partisan (16); Alliance for Progress (2); Citizens for Peru (1)

History
- Legislature term: 2021–2026
- Predecessor: Adrianzén Cabinet
- Successor: Álvarez Cabinet

On 14 May 2025, President Dina Boluarte appointed the then Minister of Justice, Eduardo Arana Ysa, as President of the Council of Ministers of the Republic of Peru, succeeding Gustavo Adrianzén. Arana was replaced as justice minister Juan Alcántara Medrano. Upon taking office, Arana became the fourth and final prime minister of Boluarte's presidency and was the second shortest-serving prime minister of her tenure.

==== Change of Ministers ====
On 23 August 2025, the president swore in the new Ministers of Justice, Women, and Social Inclusion. Montellanos took over MIDIS, while Santiváñez returned to the cabinet, this time leading the MINJUSDH.

==== End of the cabinet and government ====
In early September 2025, mass protests broke out against the presidency of Dina Boluarte and the premiership of Eduardo Arana Ysa. At least 19 protestors were injured in marches held in Lima on 27 and 28 September according to the National Human Rights Coordinator (CNDDHH).

On 1 October 2025, Minister Santiváñez submitted his resignation from the Justice portfolio. The next day, he was replaced by Juan Manuel Cavero.

On 6 October 2025, the Cajamarca regional strike began with the aim of shutting down the department of Cajamarca to secure the impeachment or resignation of President Dina Boluarte.

On 10 October 2025, against the backdrop of government ineffectiveness in fighting back violence and crime in Peru, the Congress of the Republic of Peru launched impeachment proceedings against President Dina Boluarte. The trigger for the impeachment was a shooting against members of the Agua Marina orchestra, which acted as a symbolic display of the breakdown of public order.

Boluarte's presidency was marked by historic unpopularity; she was frequently described as the "world's least popular leader," with an approval rating as low as 2% in early 2025 amid allegations of corruption, mismanagement, and repeated impeachment attempts. While previous efforts to oust her—spearheaded by left-wing parties—had failed, a broad coalition eventually formed. Right-wing parties joined the calls for her removal following a surge in violent crime, including the Círculo Militar de Chorrillos shooting. Boluarte declined to appear before Congress, with her lawyer citing alleged violations of due process. Shortly after midnight, Congress declared the presidency vacant, and José Jerí, the incumbent president of Congress, was sworn in as her successor.

Under the presidency of José Jerí, prime minister Eduardo Arana Ysa briefly remained as prime minister for three days, before leaving office on 13 October 2025 in favour of Ernesto Álvarez Miranda.

==== List of Arana's ministers ====
Portfolio	Minister	Took office	Left office	Party
President of the Council of Ministers	Eduardo Arana Ysa	14 May 2025	13 October 2025	Independent
Ministry of Foreign Affairs	Elmer Schialer	14 May 2025	13 October 2025	Independent
Ministry of Defence	Walter Astudillo	14 May 2025	13 October 2025	Independent
Ministry of Economy and Finance	Raúl Pérez-Reyes	14 May 2025	13 October 2025	Independent
Ministry of the Interior	Carlos Malaver	13 May 2025	13 October 2025	Independent
Ministry of Justice and Human Rights	Juan Alcántara Medrano	14 May 2025	13 October 2025	Independent
Ministry of Education	Morgan Quero Gaime	14 May 2025	13 October 2025	Citizens for Peru
Ministry of Health	César Vásquez Sánchez	14 March 2025	13 October 2025	Alliance for Progress
Ministry of Agriculture Development and Irrigation	Ángel Manero Campos	14 May 2025	13 October 2025	Independent
Ministry of Labour and Promotion of Employment	Daniel Maurate Romero	14 May 2025	13 October 2025	Independent
Ministry of Production	Sergio González Guerrero	14 May 2025	13 October 2025	Independent
Ministry of Foreign Trade and Tourism	Úrsula León Chempén	14 May 2025	13 October 2025	Independent
Ministry of Energy and Mines	Jorge Montero Cornejo	14 May 2025	13 October 2025	Popular Action
Ministry of Transportation and Communications	César Sandoval Pozo	13 May 2025	13 October 2025	Alliance for Progress
Ministry of Housing, Construction and Sanitation	Durich Whittembury Talledo	14 May 2025	13 October 2025	Independent
Minister of Women and Vulnerable Populations	Ángela Hernández Cajo	14 May 2025	13 October 2025	Independent
Ministry of Environment	Juan Castro Vargas	14 May 2025	13 October 2025	Independent
Ministry of Culture	Fabricio Valencia Gibaja	14 May 2025	13 October 2025	Independent
Ministry of Development and Social Inclusion	Leslie Urteaga	14 May 2025	13 October 2025	Independent

== Domestic policy ==
=== Health ===
==== FARMAMINSA public pharmacy network ====
In November 2023, the first FARMAMINSA pharmacy, located in the district of Jesús María, was inaugurated. At the beginning of 2024, a directive was approved for the implementation of a public pharmacy network known as FARMAMINSA to guarantee access to medicines at an affordable cost. In her message to the nation that year, Boluarte announced a Revolving Fund for Health Improvement to ensure the operations of FARMAMINSA. In August 2024, the government introduced the bill to implement FARMAMINSA nationwide. In November, Congress approved the implementation of FARMAMINSA pharmacies. By December, the law to implement FARMAMINSA nationwide was enacted, and an outreach campaign about FARMAMINSA was carried out. FARMAMINSA pharmacies were inaugurated in Villa El Salvador, Los Olivos, Pucusana, Mi Perú, Pamplona Alta, Jesús María, La Victoria, San Borja, Magdalena del Mar, and at the National University of San Marcos, among others.

==== MINSA Móvil ====
In December 2023, Boluarte, from San Juan de Miraflores, launched MINSA Móvil together with health minister César Vásquez with the aim of providing a mobile medical service. At that event, a field hospital was presented that would be moved nationwide, offering services in general medicine, ophthalmology, dentistry, pediatrics, gynecology and obstetrics, radiology, among others, in addition to laboratory, ultrasound and X-ray services. By 2025, it was reported that MINSA Móvil had carried out 512,967 consultations that year through 193 medical campaigns nationwide; it was also reported that 1,988 surgical procedures had been performed that year.

==== Centenary Hospitals Plan ====
In April 2024, Boluarte launched the Centenary Hospitals Plan together with Minister Vásquez from the Hospital Nacional Arzobispo Loayza. It was established that, through this plan, the infrastructure and equipment of the hospitals Arzobispo Loayza, Dos de Mayo, San Bartolomé, Cayetano Heredia, Sergio Bernales, Larco Herrera, the National Children's Institute of Breña, the National Institute of Neurological Sciences, Goyeneche in Arequipa, Las Mercedes in Lambayeque, and Belén in La Libertad would be improved. In addition, as part of the plan, the construction of a hospital in northern Lima was approved.

==== Plan Mil ====
The so-called Plan Mil was implemented under Boluarte's impetus, with the aim of improving the equipment, infrastructure and resources of one thousand health establishments nationwide. In February 2024, the Bernal I-4 Health Center in Sechura was included in the plan. In April, the inclusion of 29 health establishments in the department of San Martín in the plan was managed, and Minister Vásquez announced the prioritization of 32 health centers in the department of Huancavelica during the laying of the foundation stone of the Pampas hospital. That month, the Plan Mil Command was created. By May 2024, it was reported that 22 departments had submitted technical documents covering a total of 279 health establishments. That month, in Callao, 16 establishments were identified to form part of the plan. In June, Minister Vásquez laid the foundation stone of the Villa Los Ángeles Health Center, in the Rímac, as part of the plan. In July, intervention in 25 health centers belonging to DIRIS Lima Centro was announced, in addition to the construction, after demolition, of a new Todos los Santos Health Center. During her message to the nation, Boluarte declared her support for the plan. In September 2024, the construction of 32 establishments in the departments of Amazonas, Arequipa, Cajamarca, Cusco, Huancavelica, Huánuco, Junín, Lima, and San Martín was announced. In January 2025, the delivery of financing agreements for 17 health establishments in Cusco was announced, and work later began on the establishments in Quiñota, Colquepata, Pillpinto, Piscohuatta, and Huanoquite. In October 2025, Boluarte announced that meetings had been held with multilateral organizations to guarantee financing for the plan.

=== Education ===
==== Teacher salary increase ====
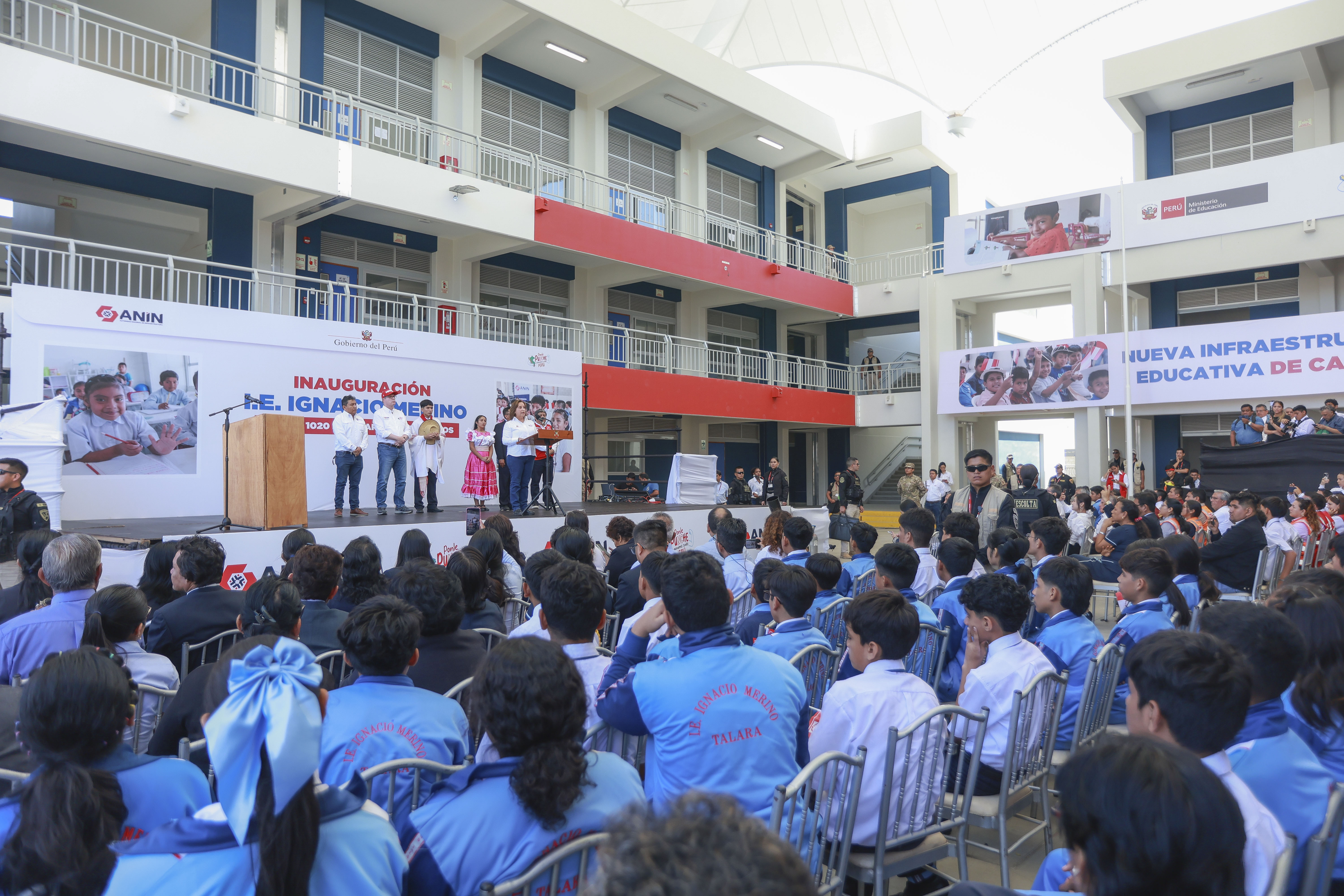
Boluarte delivering a speech during the reopening of a school in Talara.

In March 2025, Boluarte announced a salary increase for teachers, consisting of an additional 200 soles in March and another 200 in November.

==== Bicentennial Schools ====
On 29 February 2024, the first two Bicentennial Schools were delivered after 10 months of construction and were inaugurated by Dina Boluarte. These schools were No. 0085 José de la Torre Ugarte in El Agustino and No. 0035 Nuestra Señora de la Visitación in the Cercado de Lima.

On 3 September 2024, Boluarte inaugurated Bicentennial School No. 7207 Ramón Castilla in San Juan de Miraflores. On 17 September, Boluarte inaugurated Bicentennial School No. 3080 Perú–Canadá in Los Olivos District. On 20 September, Bicentennial School No. 1209 Mariscal Toribio de Luzuriaga was inaugurated. On 3 October, Bicentennial School No. 2099 Rosa Merino was inaugurated. On 25 November, Boluarte inaugurated the Bicentennial School Javier Heraud.

On 28 January 2025, Boluarte inaugurated the Bicentennial School Manuel González Prada in Ate District. On 3 March, Bicentennial School No. 2096 Perú–Japón was inaugurated. On 10 March, Bicentennial School No. 2100 Juan Velasco Alvarado was inaugurated in Comas District. On 13 March, Bicentennial School No. 1190 Felipe Huamán Poma de Ayala was inaugurated in Lurigancho-Chosica District. On 27 March, Bicentennial School No. 3088 Vista Alegre was inaugurated in Puente Piedra District.

On 23 May, Bicentennial School No. 3058 Virgen de Fátima was inaugurated in Carabayllo District. On 29 May, Bicentennial School No. 2051, also located in the district, was inaugurated. On 8 July, in the department of Junín, Boluarte inaugurated the Bicentennial School 9 de Julio. On 25 July, Bicentennial School Fernando Carbajal was inaugurated in the department of Ucayali.

==== Student mental health ====
In July 2025, the Mental Health Law was amended to promote mental health in schools across the country and to implement coordination between the Ministry of Education and the Ministry of Health to identify students at risk of developing mental illnesses and refer them to appropriate institutions. In addition, mental health content was incorporated into the national curriculum, including modules on mental health care and actions to prevent suicide. Media outlets were also required to broadcast messages aimed at preventing suicide in Spanish and Indigenous languages. The national plan Salud Mental en tu Cole 2025–2026 was implemented.

=== Security policy ===
==== Security crisis and failed fight against crime ====
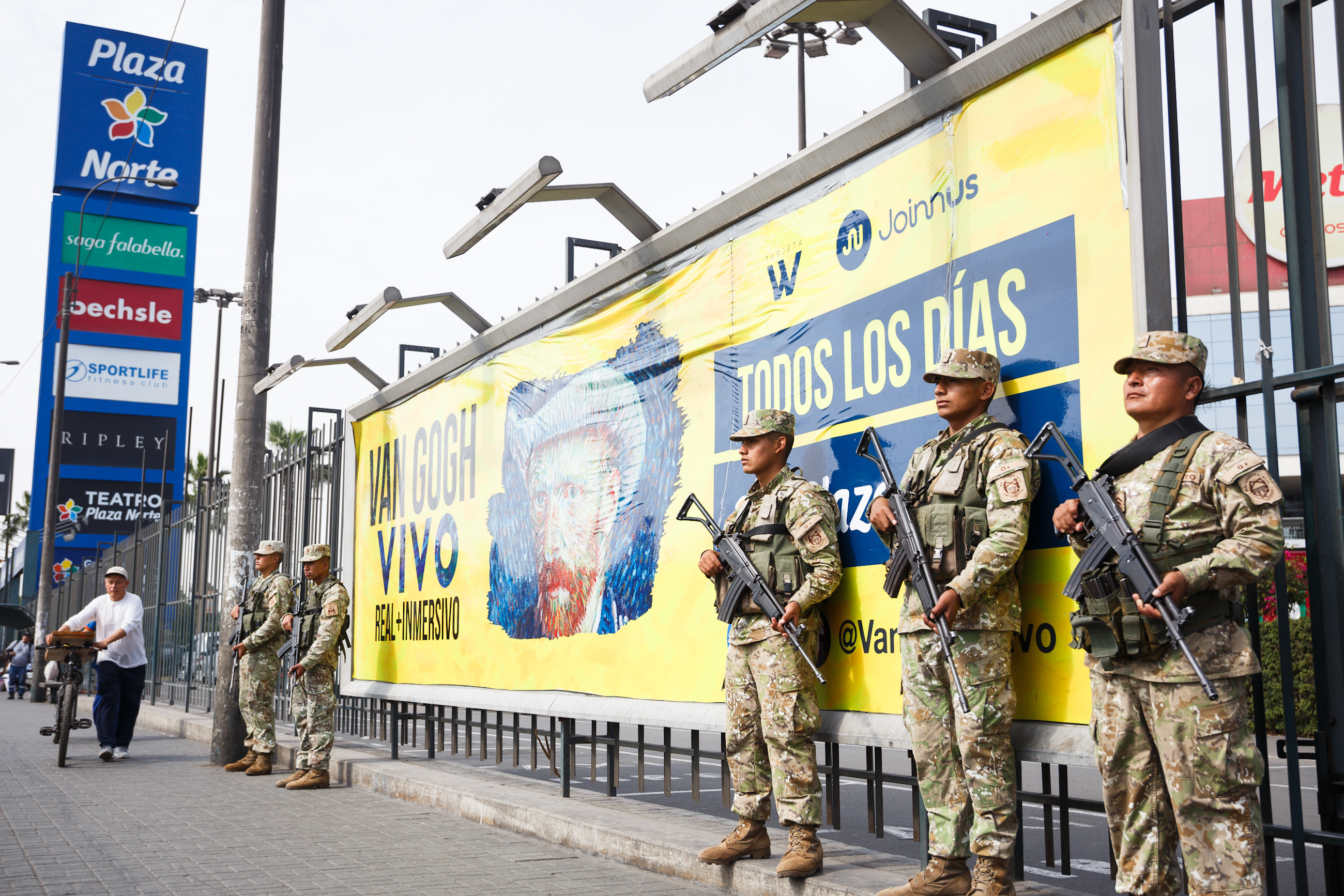
Military personnel deployed in the vicinity of Plaza Norte after the state of emergency declared in the districts of Lima Norte.

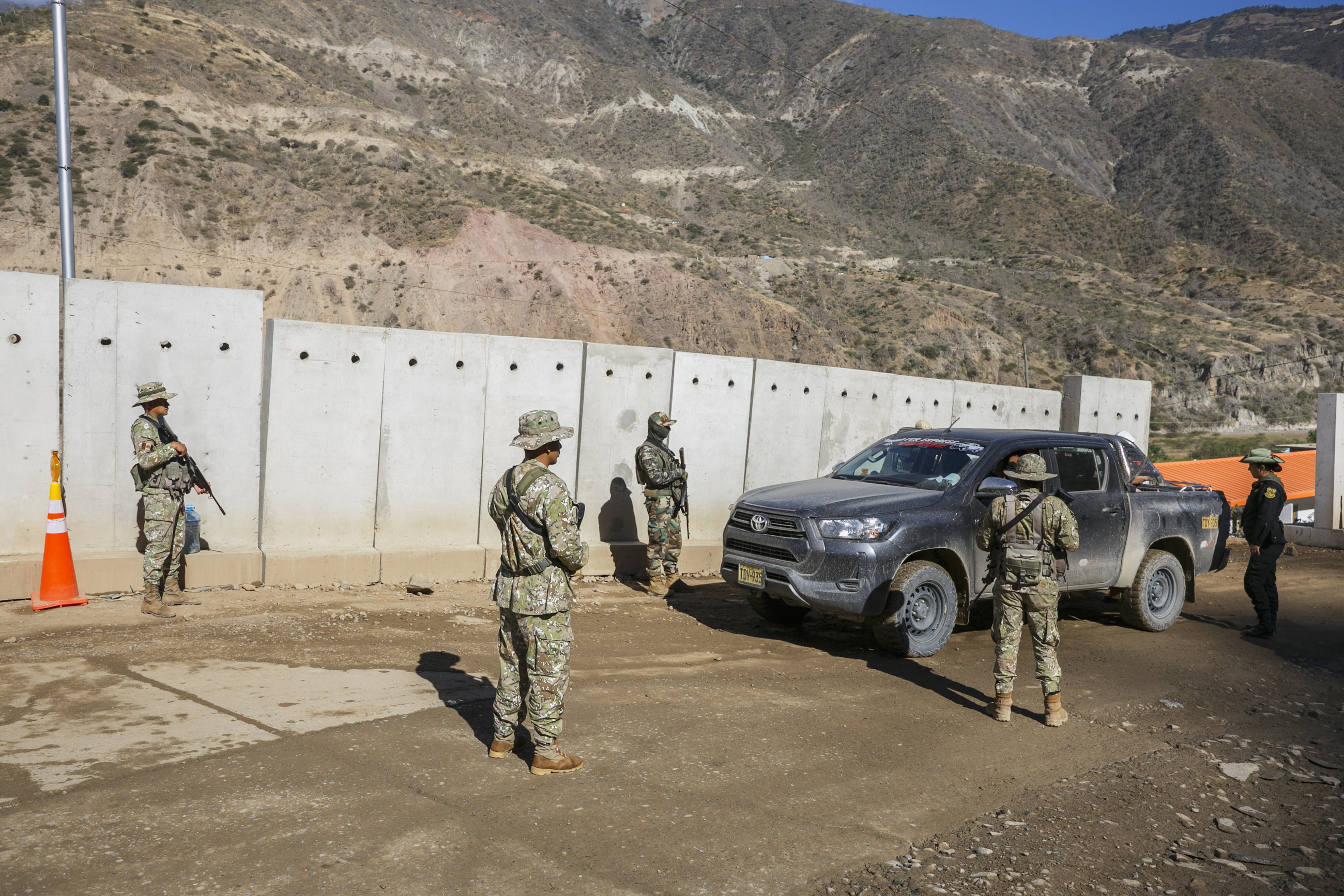
Military personnel and police carry out inspection operations in Pataz, following a series of attacks and killings perpetrated by illegal miners allied with criminal organizations in that province.

On 29 August 2023, amid calls to implement the so-called Plan Bukele in Peru, the implementation of its own plan was announced (whose popular name refers to President Dina Boluarte). The announcement was made by the president of the Council of Ministers, Alberto Otárola.

After the attack on the Xanders nightclub on 15 September, Dina Boluarte announced on 18 September the declaration of a state of emergency in the Lima districts of San Juan de Lurigancho and San Martín de Porres, as well as in Sullana Province, in Piura. It was ordered that criminals caught in flagrante delicto be presented in red uniforms, shackles, and with a sign stating the crime committed. Because of the state of emergency in San Juan de Lurigancho and San Martín de Porres, it was detected that criminals migrated toward the district of Rímac.

In her speech on 2 November 2023, already during the stage of citizen emergency, Boluarte declared during the session at the Responsible Investment Forum of the Americas Alliance that her country "is calm and at peace". Despite criticism regarding that phrase, she said days later, "we have crime, yes; but [not] a war".

The citizen security plan was one of only two interventions she made between June and October 2023, according to minutes of the Council of Ministers. The lack of interventions was due to remote work arrangements.

Over time, new states of emergency were declared. However, part of the population showed discontent with police work, an attitude that Dina Boluarte criticized. In fact, Boluarte lashed out at specialists who question the official approach and called them opinólogos. Police officer Harvey Colchado, known for participating in the raid on Dina Boluarte's house, criticized minister Juan José Santiváñez for preventing the restoration of preliminary detention, which congress members had removed from legislation in 2024. Juan José Santiváñez was censured by the Congress of the Republic, and Boluarte justified that his departure had not resolved citizen security problems.

In 2025, the government decreed the suspension of mining activity in Pataz for thirty days after the kidnapping and murder of thirteen miners at one of its facilities became known. A representative of the National Society of Mining, Petroleum and Energy requested that other entities, such as the Ministry of Energy and Mines, Osinergmin, and the OEFA, supervise mining conditions during the suspension.

=== Human rights policy ===
The president enacted two laws whose objective is to prevent prosecution for human rights crimes committed by members of the Armed Forces, National Police, or self-defense committees in the context of the Peruvian internal armed conflict or the era of terrorism 1980-2000. On 7 August 2024, the president enacted Law No. 32107 titled "Law that establishes statutes of limitations for crimes against humanity committed before 2002". That law established that it would not be possible to apply the classification of "crime against humanity" to crimes committed before Peru had signed the Rome Statute in 2002, meaning ordinary statutes of limitations would apply. On 13 August 2025, the Presidential Office announced that President Boluarte would enact in a special ceremony a new amnesty law specifically referring to the period of violence from 1980 to 2000, the "law granting amnesty to members of the Armed Forces, the National Police of Peru, and the Self-Defense Committees who participated in the fight against terrorism between 1980 and 2000". Both laws were initiatives of conservative politicians such as Jorge Montoya and Fernando Rospigliosi, and received public support from former senior military commanders in the country and from the collective La Resistencia. The enactment of both laws took place despite the existence of rulings by the Inter-American Court of Human Rights ordering the Peruvian state to suspend their processing.

=== Transport ===
In April 2023, Dina Boluarte inaugurated the second runway of Jorge Chávez International Airport, which she promised would be fully operational. However, a representative of the International Air Transport Association stated in May 2024 that the government did not take contingency measures during the lighting failures on the first runway, while the second runway remained out of service.

Boluarte also inaugurated the modular Bailey bridge in Chanchamayo (Junín), the Salvador bridge in José Crespo y Castillo (Huánuco), and the Chamorro bridge in El Carmen (Ica). She also began construction of the Carrasquillo bridge in Piura.

=== Space exploration ===
==== Artemis Accords ====
During Boluarte's government, in May 2024, Foreign Minister Javier González-Olaechea signed with the National Aeronautics and Space Administration (NASA) the Artemis Accords, a set of non-binding agreements with the United States detailing rules for space exploration.

==== Memorandum of understanding between CONIDA and NASA ====
In November 2024, a memorandum of understanding was signed between the National Commission for Aerospace Research and Development (CONIDA) and NASA, under which NASA agreed to support Peru in staff training, joint feasibility studies, technical assistance, and the development of space launches, as well as to begin a sounding rocket launch program. After the signing, and in the midst of the 2024 APEC summit, Boluarte met with Joe Biden, president of the United States, where they discussed the signed memorandum and Peru's accession to the Artemis Accords.

==== Talara spaceport ====
In 2023, during the government of Dina Boluarte, the State officially proposed the future construction of a spaceport, with Talara or Arequipa being considered as the site of the facility. The project was named "Spaceport", with the goal of inserting Peru into a "new space era". In April 2023, an agreement was signed between the Peruvian Air Force (FAP), the United States Space Command, and the Peruvian Space Agency (CONIDA), agreeing on the non-military use of outer space and on carrying out projects such as the construction of a spaceport, this being considered the first step toward later bilateral space agreements between the two countries. According to the commander general of the FAP, Carlos Chávez Cateriano, since July of that year Peru had been advancing with planning for the spaceport project in coordination with the U.S. Space Force. Subsequently, through the Multiannual Investment Report on Public-Private Partnerships of the Ministry of Defense (MINDEF) for the 2023-2026 period, approved by Ministerial Resolution No. 01558-2023-DE on 21 December of that year, the project was included and Talara Province was selected as the location for the construction of the spaceport. The site was chosen because of its proximity to the Equator, with the construction to take place within property of El Pato Air Base, which is administered by the FAP.

In February 2024, MINDEF entrusted ProInversión with the promotion and awarding of the project. On 30 May, Peru, represented by then foreign minister Javier González-Olaechea, signed the Artemis Accords with the National Aeronautics and Space Administration (NASA), through which the spaceport project could be advanced. Participating in the signing were Alfredo Ferrero Diez-Canseco, Peru's ambassador to the United States, and Jennifer R. Littlejohn, acting assistant secretary of the Bureau of Oceans and International Environmental and Scientific Affairs of the United States Department of State. By June, Lieutenant General José Antonio Martinelli, of the FAP's Space and Cyberspace Command, announced that the spaceport could be used for suborbital flights, mentioning that "we could travel from Peru to Beijing in 2.5 or 3 hours".

Within the framework of APEC 2024, Peru announced an agreement with NASA. On 18 November, the Memorandum of Understanding between CONIDA and NASA was signed, under which NASA would support Peru in staff training, joint feasibility studies, technical assistance, and the development of space launches. The signing took place at CONIDA's facilities in San Isidro district, with the participation of Bill Nelson, NASA administrator, and Major Roberto Melgar Sheen, head of CONIDA. For its part, the National Center for Strategic Planning (CEPLAN) announced the start of drafting a National Space Policy, which would be managed by CONIDA.

On 29 September 2025, the executive branch, represented by President Dina Boluarte and Prime Minister Eduardo Arana, submitted to the Congress a bill to declare of national interest the creation of a spaceport in national territory. In March 2026, the National Defense Commission of Congress approved the report on the bill. In that month, with 78 votes in favor, Congress approved on second vote the project submitted by Boluarte, with 3 votes against and 3 abstentions. On 27 March, under Law 32571, it was officially published in El Peruano.

=== Sport ===
==== Support for the Peruvian bid for the 2027 Pan American Games ====
On 18 January 2024, in commemoration of the 489th anniversary of Lima, the president of Peru, Dina Boluarte, announced that the national government would support Lima's bid for the 2027 Pan American Games and that this backing had been communicated to Panam Sports. In March of that year, Lima was chosen as the new host city of the 2027 Pan American Games. At the end of the year, the 2024 Bolivarian Games were held, although the president did not attend the उद्घाटन.

==== Olympic Cycle Program ====
In December 2024, the Olympic Cycle Program was launched to provide continuous funding for athletes and para-athletes in preparation for the 2028 Olympic Games. The program includes coverage for training, the hiring of coaches, and technical monitoring, in addition to funding athletes who obtained medals or diplomas at the Olympic Games of that year.

==== Dissolution of Proyecto Legado ====
In 2025, the government announced that it would dissolve the Proyecto Especial Legado, which was responsible for administering the sports venues built for the 2019 Pan American Games. The minister of education justified this decision on efficiency grounds and to avoid duplication. Carlos Neuhaus, who directed the project, warned that its elimination could seriously affect the development of sport in the country. Olympic medalist Stefano Peschiera criticized the measure because athletes would be affected in the development of their training. Neither the prime minister nor the Ministry of Education made statements about the decision before the Congress of the Republic. After Proyecto Especial Legado was dissolved, the infrastructure remained under the responsibility of the Peruvian Sport Institute (IPD), keeping it operational.

==== 2025 Copa Libertadores final ====
In April 2025, Boluarte met with Alejandro Domínguez, president of the South American Football Confederation (CONMEBOL), to guarantee the holding of the final of the 2025 Copa Libertadores, announcing in a ceremony at the Government Palace that the city of Lima would be the host of that sporting event.

==== Lima 2027 Program ====
In August 2024, Boluarte announced a program for athletes called the Lima 2027 - Los Angeles 2028 Program, referring to athlete Stefano Peschiera as its first member. In her 2025 message to the nation, Boluarte announced the launch of the Lima 2027 Program aimed at athletes who would participate in the 2027 Pan American and Parapan American Games. By September 2025, the Special Commission on the Lima 2027 Pan American and Parapan American Games of Congress met with Federico Tong, president of the IPD, so that he could explain the scope of the program. In that month, tennis player Ignacio Buse was reported as a member of the program.

=== Immigration ===
In April 2023, Boluarte proposed an immigration reform. In addition, due to the migration crisis with Chile, the government granted amnesty to people with irregular immigration status, allowing them to obtain a Temporary Stay Permit Card.

== Foreign policy ==
Political support by country (2022–2023): Pedro Castillo Dina Boluarte

The foreign policy of the government of Dina Boluarte has been represented by Ana Gervasi (2022–2023), Javier González-Olaechea (2023–2024) and Elmer Schialer (2024–2025) as ministers of foreign affairs of Peru. It has been marked by the strengthening of Peru's relations with the People's Republic of China, expressed in Boluarte's trip to that country and the holding of the APEC Peru 2024 summit with the participation of President Xi Jinping, with a subsequent cooling in relations with the United States; the diplomatic conflict over the removal of Pedro Castillo with the governments of Argentina, Bolivia, Colombia and Mexico; accession to the "Pact for the Future" and the signing of the "High Seas Treaty" of the United Nations; the advancement of relations with Vietnam and the diplomatic crisis with Venezuela after the results of that country's election, in which Peru recognized Edmundo González as president-elect following allegations of alleged fraud by ruling party candidate Nicolás Maduro.

=== International organizations and treaties ===
After the failed self-coup attempt by Pedro Castillo and Boluarte's subsequent assumption of office, the Puebla Group, which brings together various left-wing organizations, expressed to Boluarte "all our support" to lead Peru toward a "new social pact".

The Madrid Forum, an Ibero-American organization created by the Spanish party Vox that brings together right-wing politicians and organizations, denounced in 2023 a "foreign plan to destabilize Peru" in the context of the protests during the social upheaval. The São Paulo Forum, meanwhile, positioned itself against Boluarte's government and rejected the "criminalization of social protest".

Boluarte's government had clashes with multiple international organizations after the pardon of Alberto Fujimori in 2023, among them the Inter-American Court of Human Rights (IACtHR), which had asked it to refrain from releasing him. The Inter-American Commission on Human Rights (IACHR), for its part, issued a report on the protests during the social upheaval in which it stated that the state response "was characterized by the disproportionate, indiscriminate and lethal use of force", denouncing cases of "extrajudicial executions". The Peruvian government rejected the IACHR's assertions.

In 2023, Boluarte signed the "Belém Declaration". In May 2024, Peru acceded to the Artemis Accords. Subsequently, Foreign Minister Schialer had Peru accede to the UN's "Pact for the Future", based on the Sustainable Development Goals. This prompted criticism from the Peruvian right. In addition, after traveling to France, Boluarte signed the "High Seas Treaty", an act that drew criticism, accusations and complaints of alleged treason due to loss of sovereignty.

During Boluarte's government, Peru came into conflict with the OECD, with the government criticized by the international organization regarding Law 31990, the OECD demanding that the government not approve it. This situation led to the freezing of Peru's accession process to that international organization. In her 2025 message to the Nation, Boluarte declared that Peru had formally begun the OECD accession process, although that process had begun during the administration of Pedro Castillo. However, by September of that same year, the OECD warned that Peru was not complying with the provisions contained in its convention.

=== International relations ===
==== Americas ====
===== Argentina =====
On December 9, 2022, Argentine president Alberto Fernández gave his backing and support to Boluarte amid the transition between her government and Castillo's, according to a statement the president posted on social media thanking Fernández. On December 12, Argentina published a joint statement with Bolivia, Colombia and Mexico, expressing concern about the situation in Peru, criticizing that Pedro Castillo was the "victim of anti-democratic harassment", calling for his human rights and urging "those who make up the institutions to refrain from reversing the popular will expressed through free suffrage".

Boluarte responded by declaring: "I very much regret that these presidents have to accompany in his defense a former president who carried out a coup d'état, which turns him into a dictator and, on top of that, under investigation for corruption-related issues".

===== Bolivia =====
On December 12, 2022, the government of Luis Arce published a joint statement with Argentina, Colombia and Mexico, expressing concern about the situation in Peru, criticizing that Pedro Castillo was the "victim of anti-democratic harassment", calling for his human rights and urging "those who make up the institutions to refrain from reversing the popular will expressed through free suffrage".

Boluarte responded by declaring: "I very much regret that these presidents have to accompany in his defense a former president who carried out a coup d'état, which turns him into a dictator and, on top of that, under investigation for corruption-related issues".

Former Bolivian president Evo Morales, who supported Pedro Castillo, asserting that his removal was illegal and supporting the protests against Boluarte's government, was banned from entering Peru from January 2023 for his "intervention" in internal Peruvian affairs. Then-Peruvian prime minister Alberto Otárola declared: "We are closely watching not only Mr. Morales's attitude, but also that of those who work with him in southern Peru... They have been very active in promoting a crisis situation".

In July 2025, after declaring in her message to the Nation that Bolivia was a "failed country", the Bolivian Foreign Ministry expressed its rejection of those statements. In response, Foreign Minister Schialer declared that the president's words had been misinterpreted and denied that there were intentions to break relations with Bolivia. According to Infobae, the description of Bolivia as a "failed state" was an act of "improvisation", since Peru occupies 76th place in the Fragile States Index, five places above Bolivia.

===== Brazil =====
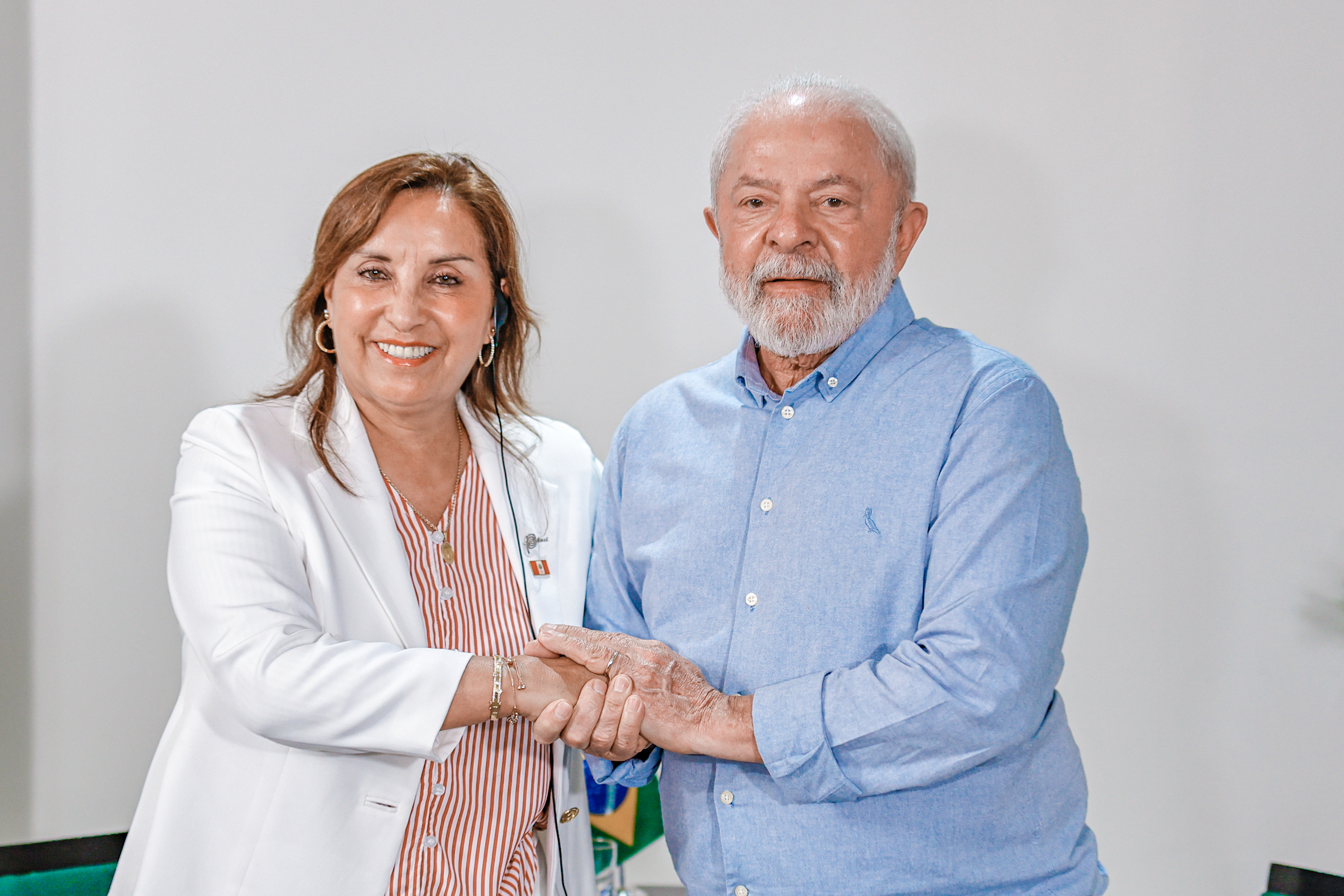
Dina Boluarte and Lula da Silva in August 2023.

Brazilian president Luiz Inácio Lula da Silva supported Dina Boluarte's government after her inauguration.

In August 2023, Boluarte made her first official trip abroad, attending the 4th Meeting of Presidents of the States Parties to the Amazon Cooperation Treaty (ACTO) in Brazil, where she met with the president.

===== Canada =====
Canada's ambassador to the United States and Chilean president Gabriel Boric refused to hold a meeting with Boluarte together with businesspeople at APEC in the United States in November 2023.

===== Chile =====
Chilean president Gabriel Boric criticized Boluarte before the Community of Latin American and Caribbean States (CELAC) in January 2023 for the repression that occurred in the protests against her government that year, which left 50 dead, and described as "unacceptable" the violent entry of the police into the National University of San Marcos in Lima, which ended with more than 200 detentions, which according to him revived "the sad scenes of the times of the dictatorships of the Southern Cone", expressing "the urgent need for a change of course". Due to the migration crisis at the border regarding irregular migrants, Peruvian authorities blamed President Boric for the situation.

Boric and Canada's ambassador to the United States refused to hold a meeting with Boluarte together with businesspeople at APEC in the United States in November 2023.

===== Colombia =====
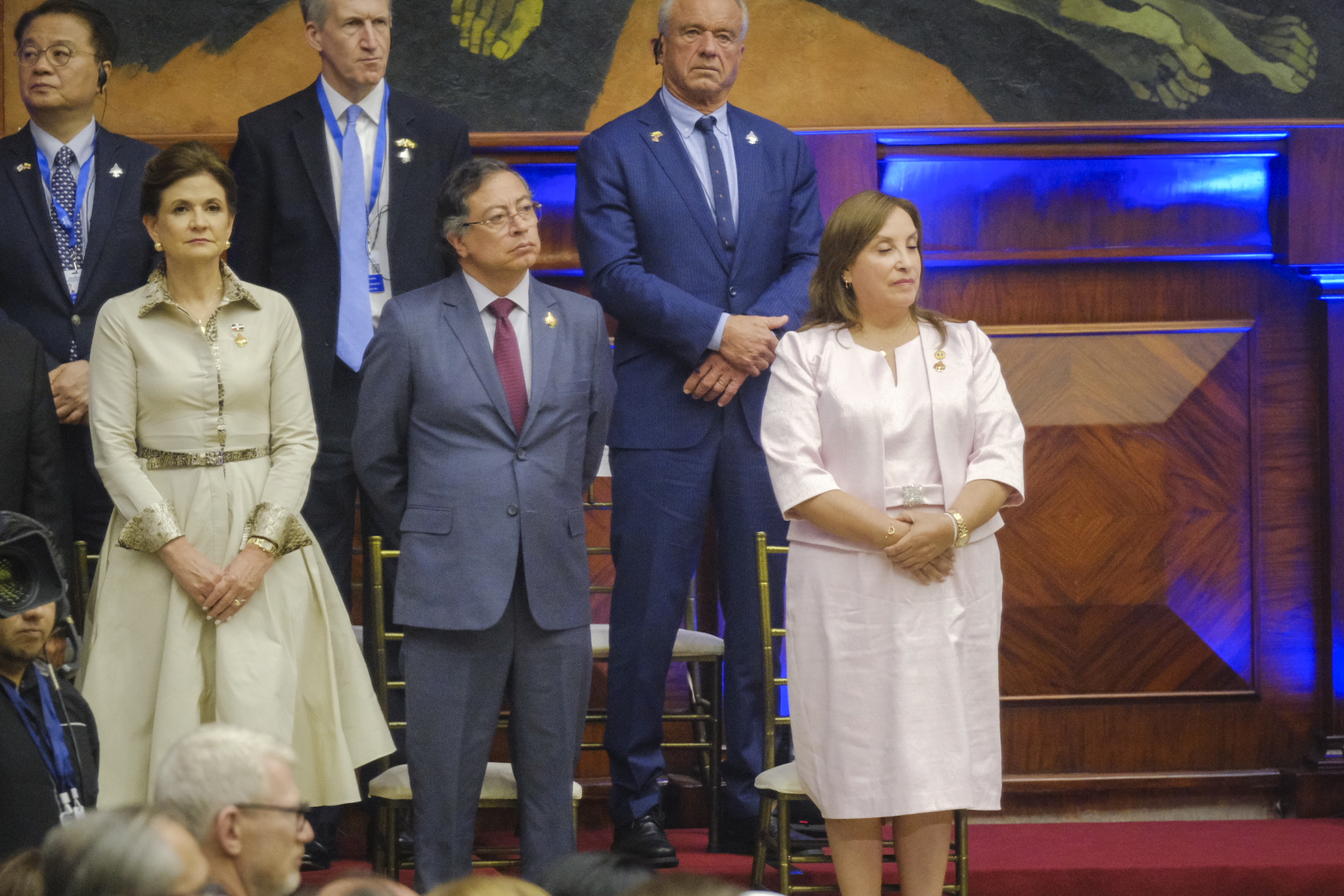
Dina Boluarte and Gustavo Petro in May 2025.

Colombian president Gustavo Petro refused to recognize Dina Boluarte as president of Peru after the third vacancy process against Pedro Castillo and the 2022 Peruvian self-coup attempt.

On December 12, 2022, Colombia published a joint statement with Argentina, Bolivia and Mexico, expressing concern about the situation in Peru, criticizing that Pedro Castillo was the "victim of anti-democratic harassment", calling for his human rights and urging "those who make up the institutions to refrain from reversing the popular will expressed through free suffrage".

Boluarte responded by declaring: "I very much regret that these presidents have to accompany in his defense a former president who carried out a coup d'état, which turns him into a dictator and, on top of that, under investigation for corruption-related issues".

Foreign Minister Gervasi criticized this, responding that it did not follow "the principles and values that govern democratic coexistence in the region". In September 2023, Boluarte stated in an interview that "we will keep moving forward with regard to Colombia, so nothing is lost".

In May 2025, Boluarte and Petro met during the ceremony of the second inauguration of Daniel Noboa. In that context, the president refused to greet her Colombian counterpart, which evidenced the persistent tension in diplomatic relations between the two countries.

In August, Petro accused Peru, via X, of "taking over" Santa Rosa Island (Chinería) and violating the Protocol of Rio de Janeiro by creating the district of Santa Rosa de Loreto. In Leticia, he reiterated that Colombia does not recognize Peruvian sovereignty over the island. The Peruvian government rejected these statements through an official pronouncement, recalling that the territory is under Peru's full jurisdiction according to the Salomón-Lozano Treaty and subsequent agreements. From Japan, President Boluarte reaffirmed that the island belongs to Peru and denied the existence of a territorial dispute.

===== Cuba =====
Cuba supported Pedro Castillo during his vacancy process; however, after Dina Boluarte took office, Miguel Díaz-Canel declared that "Cuba defends the principle of non-interference in the internal affairs of states" and that "it is up to the Peruvian people to find solutions to their challenges by themselves, by virtue of their legitimate interests", assuring that their decisions "must be respected".

===== Ecuador =====
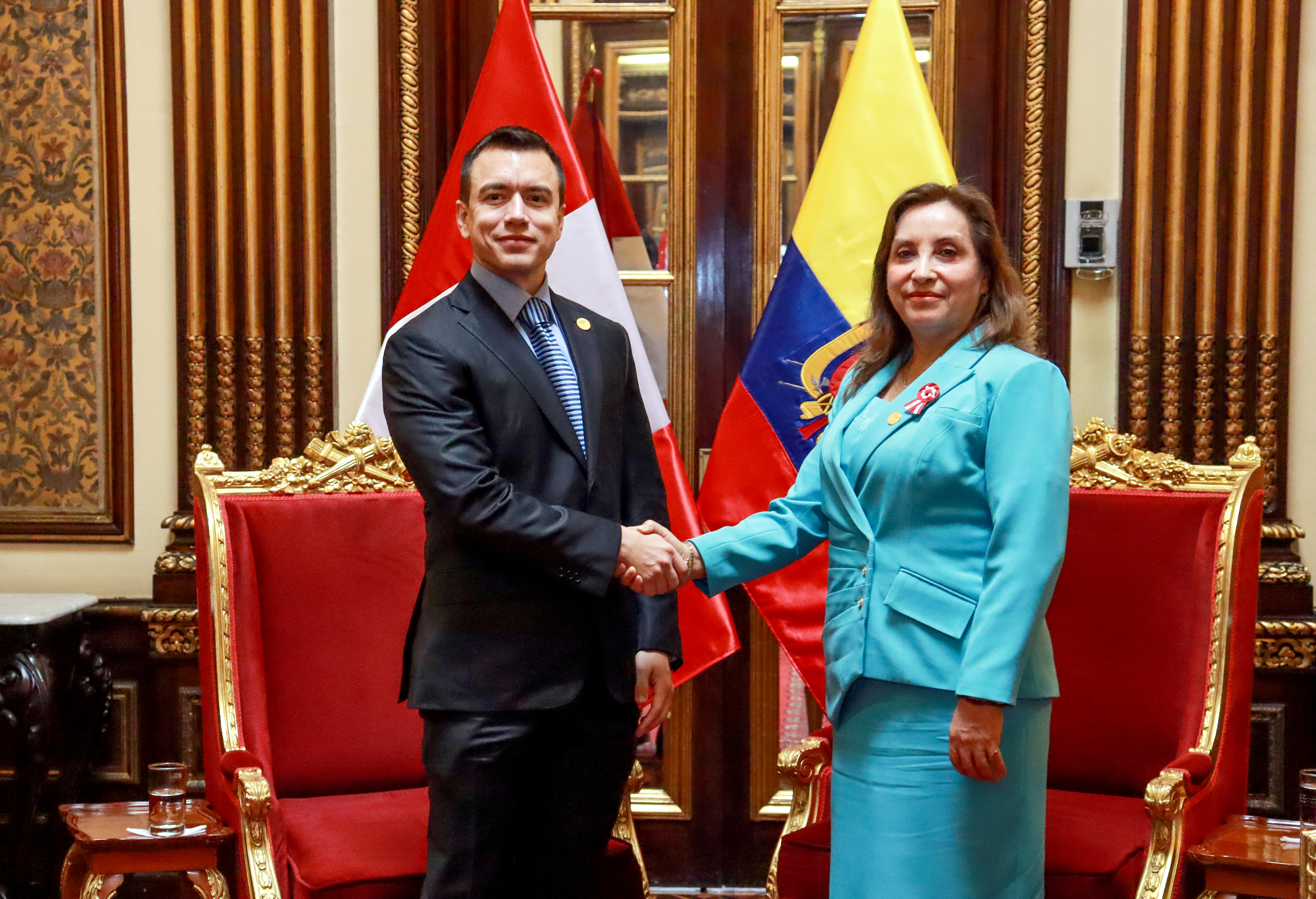
Dina Boluarte and Daniel Noboa in July 2024.

Dina Boluarte received President Guillermo Lasso in Lima, awarding him the Order of the Sun of Peru in October 2023, and they decided to extend the validity of the Binational Development Plan for the Peru-Ecuador Border Region.

Boluarte congratulated President Daniel Noboa after his victory in the 2023 election. After the outbreak of the internal armed conflict in Ecuador, Boluarte's government declared that it "strongly condemns the acts of violence that occurred" and that "Peru expresses its solidarity with the victims".

At the beginning of July 2024, the 15th Peru-Ecuador Binational Cabinet was held in Lima, with President Noboa in attendance. During this meeting, the Presidential Declaration of Lima was signed.

In May 2025, the president visited Quito for Noboa's second presidential inauguration. During her stay, she held a meeting with her Ecuadorian counterpart, in which both presidents signed a roadmap for the protection of the Puyango-Tumbes basin.

===== El Salvador =====
In 2023, a political debate arose in Peru over whether Boluarte's government should implement a security policy similar to that of Salvadoran president Nayib Bukele. Bukele posted a poll on X asking whether the "Bukele Plan" should be implemented in Peru, and the result was favorable by 93%. In February 2024, the Peruvian Foreign Ministry issued a congratulatory statement to President Bukele after he announced himself the winner of the election.

===== United States =====
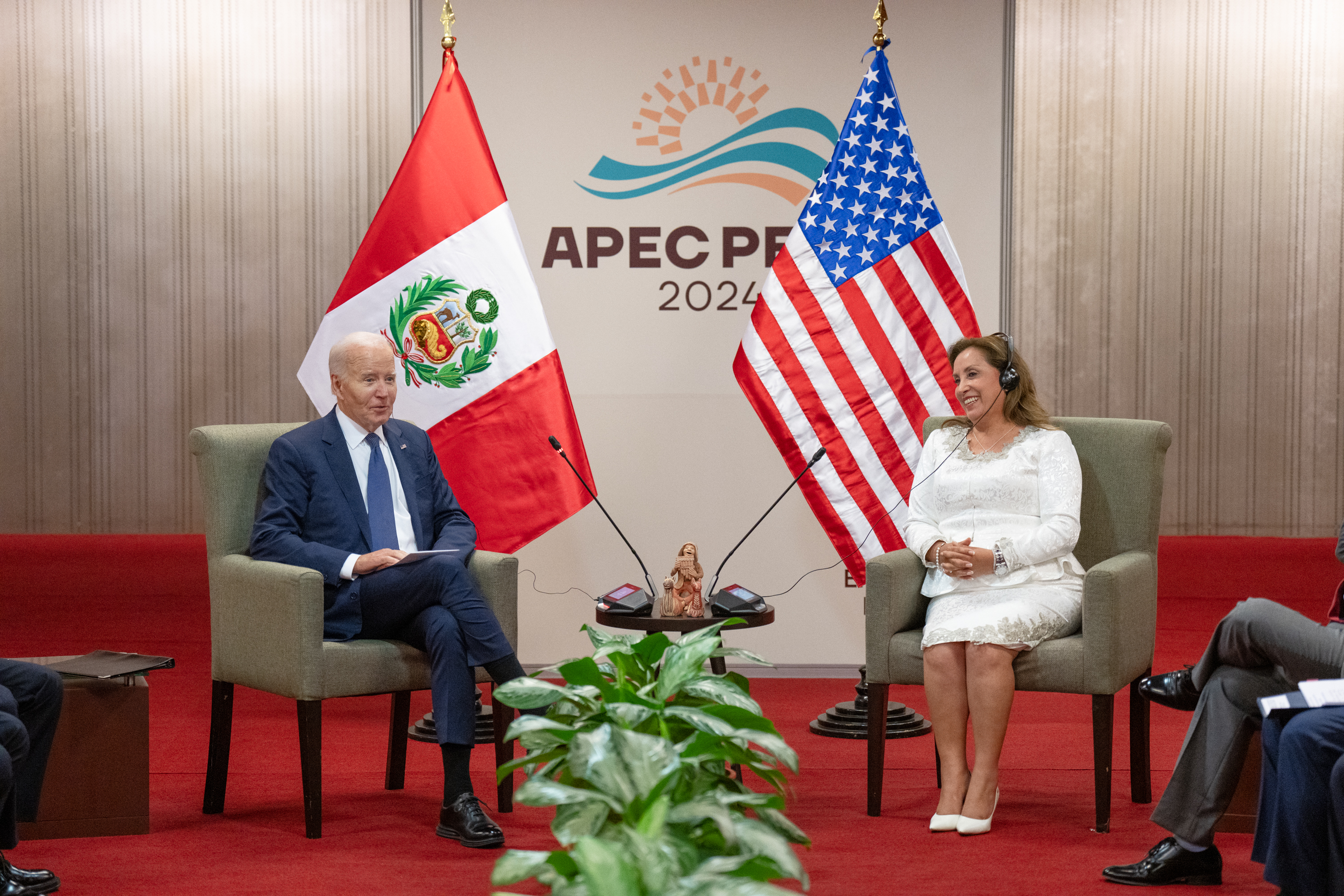
Dina Boluarte and Joe Biden in November 2024.

After Castillo's failed self-coup attempt and after Boluarte assumed office, the United States recognized her as president of Peru. Subsequently, Secretary of State Antony Blinken reiterated the United States' support for Peru's "democratic institutional process". However, after the deaths during the social upheaval, then-ambassador Lisa Kenna stated that "it is urgent that measures be taken to stop this painful situation of violence and avoid the loss of more human lives". By July 2023, a group of 15 Democratic members of Congress sent a letter to Blinken expressing "serious concerns about threats to human rights, democracy and the rule of law". Subsequently, by April 2024, the State Department, led by Blinken, presented a report on human rights in 2023 in which it accused, based on "credible reports", Boluarte's government of extrajudicial executions, censorship and corruption.

In May 2023, as Castillo had done during his term, the Peruvian government authorized the entry of U.S. military personnel into Peru for training activities between American and Peruvian forces.

The Congress authorized President Dina Boluarte's trip to the United States in October 2023, where she participated in the first Summit of Leaders of the Americas Partnership for Economic Prosperity (APEP), after the announcement that she would have a meeting with U.S. president Joe Biden that had not actually been scheduled. After that meeting did not take place, a scandal ensued that ended with the resignation of Foreign Minister Ana Gervasi and the ambassador to the United States, Gustavo Meza-Cuadra. Subsequently, as part of the APEC 2024 summit, Biden and Boluarte would hold a meeting in which they discussed the fight against drug trafficking, the donation of Caltrain trains from California to the Metropolitan Municipality of Lima, cooperation with NASA on space issues, and the process of restoring democracy in Venezuela. Despite this, Peru's distancing from the United States was noted due to Biden's discreet reception compared with Xi Jinping's, as the American president was received by Prime Minister Gustavo Adrianzén without red carpet or protocol honors.

In 2025, Minister Elmer Schialer confirmed that the presidency of Donald Trump suspended financial aid to the country supplied through the United States Agency for International Development (USAID) for 90 days, within the framework of changes made to that U.S. agency. Donald Trump also intended to apply tariffs to exported Peruvian products, which ADEX warned would affect eight out of every ten empty containers. Subsequently, on May 13, 2025, the United States officially called on Peru to limit its relationship with China, after a meeting at The Pentagon between Pete Hegseth, U.S. secretary of defense; Walter Astudillo, Peruvian defense minister; and Foreign Minister Schialer. On June 26 of the same year, The New York Times revealed that the U.S. government had repeatedly pressured Peru to receive foreign criminals in its prisons. Those proposals, despite Schialer mentioning on one occasion that the viability of that option could be considered, were rejected in their entirety by the Peruvian government. In September, at a meeting of the United Nations General Assembly in New York, Boluarte declared, with a mocking smile, that "I know that many, and especially President Trump, have not liked that we inaugurated the Port of Chancay", declaring that she had asked President Joe Biden during APEC 2023 to meet with Trump, but it did not happen, although she later said she wished to meet with Trump to discuss investment options and for the U.S. to have more presence in Latin America and Peru. Boluarte's comments were seen as an attempt to seek to strengthen relations with the U.S. as well as with other powers, although also as mischievous mockery. Subsequently, Gustavo Adrianzén, Peru's permanent representative to the United Nations, reported that, after her statements, Boluarte would have had a private meeting with Trump. For his part, Rafael López Aliaga, mayor of Lima, reported that the State Department would present a formal complaint to the Peruvian government for not putting into operation the donated Lima-Chosica commuter rail since they considered such action a "very serious insult" on the part of Boluarte's government.

===== Mexico =====
Mexican president Andrés Manuel López Obrador described the third vacancy process against Pedro Castillo as a "soft coup", Castillo having been detained on the way to the Mexican Embassy in Peru to obtain political asylum. On December 12, 2022, Mexico published a joint statement with Argentina, Bolivia and Colombia, expressing concern about the situation in Peru, criticizing that Pedro Castillo was the "victim of anti-democratic harassment", calling for his human rights and urging "those who make up the institutions to refrain from reversing the popular will expressed through free suffrage".

On February 24, 2023, President Boluarte accused President AMLO of "interference in internal affairs" and announced the withdrawal of Peru's ambassador to Mexico, declaring that relations between the two countries "are formally reduced to the level of chargés d'affaires". Boluarte declared on May 7, 2023: "I very much regret that these presidents have to accompany in his defense a former president who carried out a coup d'état, which turns him into a dictator and, on top of that, under investigation for corruption-related issues".

On May 15, 2023, the Mexican president described Dina Boluarte as a "usurper" of the presidency and assured that he considered that she had been "imposed", asking that she resign and "that they let Pedro Castillo out of jail". For this reason, AMLO tried to avoid the transfer to Peru of the pro tempore presidency of the Pacific Alliance. Foreign Minister Gervasi criticized the measure, responding that this "is a manifestation of the level of negligence with which he guides his actions in the foreign sphere" and accusing him of not following "the principles and values that govern democratic coexistence in the region".

===== Nicaragua =====
Nicaraguan leader Daniel Ortega called for the release and reinstatement of Pedro Castillo and criticized Boluarte for the repression that occurred in the 2023 protests, which left 50 dead.

===== Venezuela =====
The government of Nicolás Maduro and Boluarte's government have had diplomatic frictions since the social unrest. Chavista representative Diosdado Cabello described the acts of police repression that occurred in Juliaca as a "massacre". Subsequently, the National Police of Peru assaulted members of Venezuela's football team in the match between the two countries held in Lima in 2023, and the Venezuelan football team's plane was denied the ability to refuel for several hours for no apparent reason.

In 2024, the Ministry of Foreign Affairs ordered Venezuelan diplomats accredited in Peru to leave the country within a maximum of 72 hours. The order came after its foreign minister denounced electoral fraud in the 2024 Venezuelan presidential election. In that election, only 659 of the more than one million Venezuelans residing in Peruvian territory were eligible to vote and, in that group, the candidate with the most votes was Edmundo González. Hours later, Venezuela broke relations.

In 2025, the Peruvian government ratified that it would not recognize Nicolás Maduro during his third inauguration of Nicolás Maduro, opting to recognize Edmundo González as president-elect. Dina Boluarte called him a "tyrant" and compared him to Pedro Castillo's self-coup attempt, ignoring all responsibility for accusations of human rights violations.

The Peruvian government decorated Edmundo González with the Order of the Sun of Peru. In addition, it advocated for a democratic transition, rejecting any intervention in Venezuela and describing such action, if it occurred, as an "invasion".

==== Asia ====
===== Brunei =====
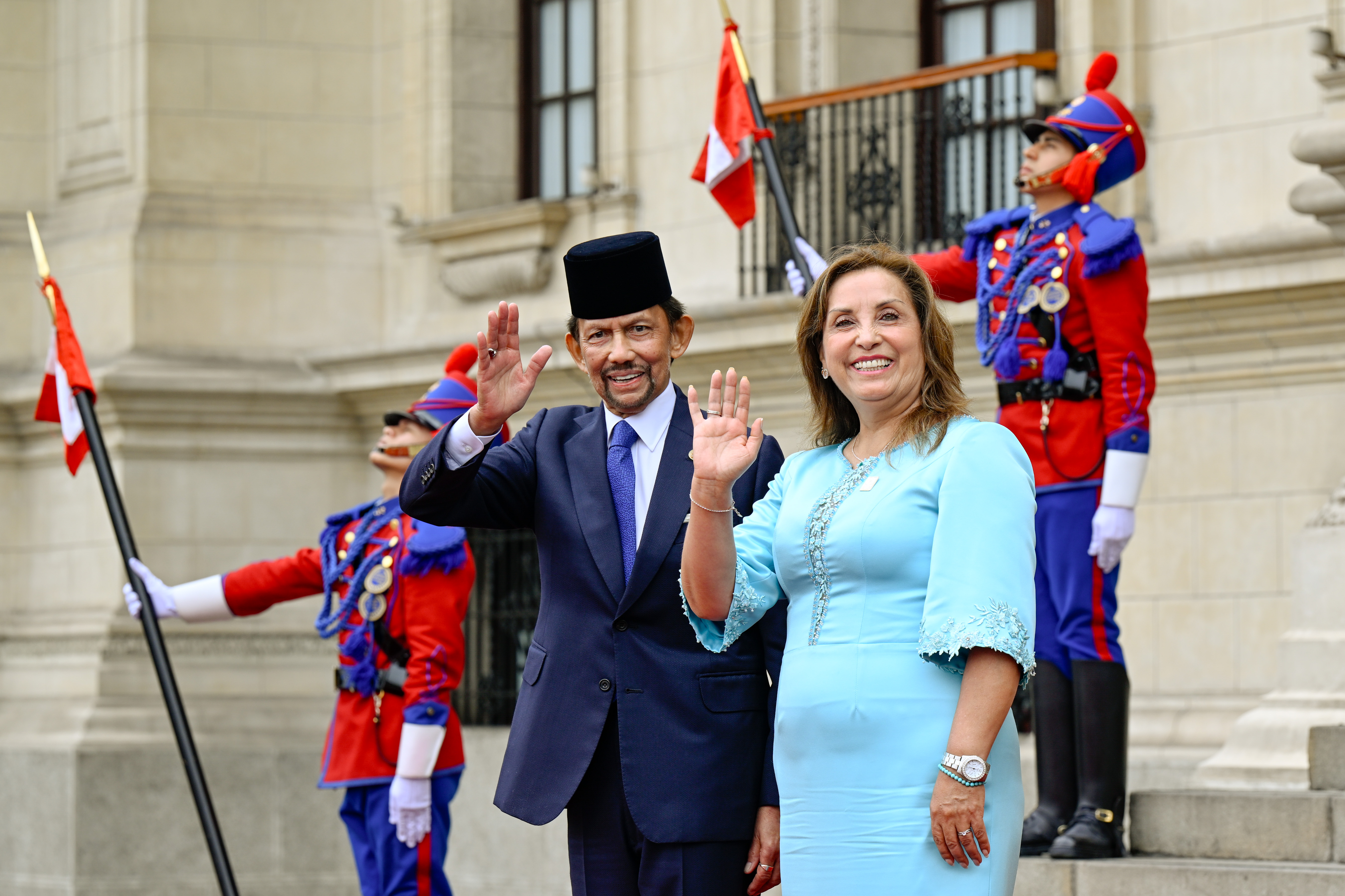
Dina Boluarte and Hassanal Bolkiah in November 2024.

In November 2024, within the framework of APEC, the sultan of Brunei, Hassanal Bolkiah, paid a state visit to Peru, where he met with President Dina Boluarte. During the meeting, they addressed issues such as economic cooperation, collaboration in the energy sector and joint efforts to mitigate climate change. The president decorated the Asian monarch with the Order of the Sun.

===== China =====
In November 2023, in San Francisco, United States, during the 30th APEC Economic Leaders' Meeting, Xi Jinping met with Boluarte, where both discussed strengthening cooperation between China and Peru.

In June 2024, President Boluarte made an official visit to China, where she held important political and business meetings in Shenzhen, Shanghai and Beijing, including a meeting with her counterpart Xi Jinping.

In November, within the framework of the APEC summit, the Chinese leader paid a state visit to Peru, where he met with President Boluarte. Unlike Biden, president of the United States, Xi Jinping was received with state honors, portable speakers chanting his name, and a red carpet. During the meeting, both leaders signed bilateral agreements, reinforcing economic cooperation between Peru and China. In addition, virtually, they jointly inaugurated the megaport of Chancay. The Chinese leader described the port's inauguration as "the birth of a new land-sea corridor for a new era" in which "the great Inca road and the Maritime Silk Road" would be connected.

After reports of illegal fishing by Chinese vessels, Boluarte's government declared that the scarcity of jumbo flying squid was due to the El Niño phenomenon, which was denied by the fishermen. It was alleged that Boluarte's government allowed Chinese illegal fishing.

On May 12, 2025, within the framework of the 4th Ministerial Meeting of the China-CELAC Forum, Foreign Minister Schialer met with Wang Yi, director of the Office of the Central Commission for Foreign Affairs of the Central Committee of the Chinese Communist Party, in which they discussed and celebrated the trade relationship between the two countries, which reached US$41 billion in 2024, representing growth of 12% compared with 2023. On May 15, through a statement, Peru welcomed China's decision to exempt Peruvian citizens from the visa requirement to enter that eastern country, the measure entering into force on June 1. On May 26, a meeting was held between Raúl Pérez-Reyes, minister of economy; César Sandoval Pozo, minister of transport; and Fei Dongbin, president of the China National Railway Administration, to discuss the development of rail infrastructure in Peru and promote a meeting among the governments of Brazil, China and Peru to agree on regional integration objectives through the Central Bioceanic Railway Corridor.

On June 11, 2025, the Chinese ambassador to Peru, Song Yang, expressed China's desire to cooperate with Peru in its fight against crime. On June 13, an agreement was signed between Empresa Peruana de Servicios Editoriales S.A. (Editora Perú) and Chinese news agency CCTV for cooperation between both state media outlets, the broadcasting of programs, technological advice, and the use by CCTV of content generated by the Andina agency and El Peruano.

===== South Korea =====
In November 2024, in the context of the APEC forum, the president of South Korea, Yoon Suk-yeol, paid an official visit to Peru, where he met with President Dina Boluarte. During the meeting, both leaders signed several memorandums aimed at strengthening trade, investment, tourism and cooperation in sectors such as defense, science and technology. As part of the official ceremony, President Boluarte decorated the South Korean president with the Order of the Sun, while he distinguished the Peruvian president with the Order of Mugunghwa.

===== Indonesia =====
In November 2024, within the framework of the APEC summit, the president of Indonesia, Prabowo Subianto, paid an official visit to Peru, where he met with President Dina Boluarte. During the meeting, both leaders addressed issues of bilateral interest, such as economic cooperation and the strengthening of ties between the two nations. As part of the visit, the Peruvian president decorated her Indonesian counterpart with the Order of the Sun.

In August 2025, Boluarte paid a state visit to Indonesia, where she met with political authorities, including the president of the People's Representative Council, Puan Maharani; the secretary-general of the ASEAN, Kao Kim Hourn; and her Indonesian counterpart, Prabowo Subianto. During the meeting between the two leaders, the Comprehensive Economic Partnership Agreement (CEPA) was signed with the objective of promoting bilateral trade and investment. Under this pact, 56% of Peruvian exports will enter the Southeast Asian country duty-free.

===== Japan =====
Shigeru Ishiba during his official visit to Peru in November 2024.

During the APEC summit, the exemption from the visa requirement for Peruvian citizens traveling to Japan was announced. Subsequently, it was announced that the measure would be in force from July 1, 2025, with the objective of strengthening relations between the two countries. In addition, during that summit, an agreement was signed between Shigeru Ishiba, Japanese prime minister, and the Peruvian government establishing a "roadmap" for the period 2024-2033 with a focus on collaboration in defense, mineral supply chains and economic projects. As part of the defense commitments, Ishiba announced the donation of firefighting vehicles and specialized equipment to combat forest fires.

In August 2025, the president made an official visit to Japan, where she participated in various activities. Among them, she inaugurated the 16th Meeting of the Peru-Japan Business Council (CEPEJA) and held a bilateral meeting with Prime Minister Ishiba, in which they addressed issues of economic cooperation and the strengthening of science and technology. Likewise, she held an audience with Emperor Naruhito, with whom she discussed the cultural tradition that has united both nations for more than 150 years.

===== Malaysia =====
In November 2024, within the framework of APEC, Malaysian prime minister Anwar Ibrahim paid an official visit to Peru, where he met with President Dina Boluarte. During the meeting, both leaders signed various memorandums of understanding in the fields of Halal certification, agriculture, gastronomy and tourism. The head of state decorated the prime minister with the Order of the Sun.

===== Vietnam =====
In November 2024, on the occasion of the APEC meeting, the president of Vietnam, Lương Cường, made his first official visit, being decorated with the Order of the Sun by President Boluarte. The visit coincided with the 30th anniversary of the re-establishment of diplomatic relations between the two countries. A joint declaration was issued in which preparations were established for the opening of Vietnam's embassy in Peru and an invitation was extended to Boluarte to visit Vietnam on a date to be determined. In 2025, during her trip to France to sign the "High Seas Treaty", Boluarte met with Pham Minh Chinh, prime minister of Vietnam, during which they discussed the opening of Vietnam's embassy in Peru, the promotion of gas massification and telecommunications projects in the Amazon and remote areas, in addition to the prime minister reiterating the invitation to Boluarte to visit Vietnam.

==== Europe ====
===== Spain =====
On December 8, 2022, after speaking with Boluarte, Pedro Sánchez, president of Spain, condemned the rupture of the constitutional order brought about by Castillo and conveyed his support to Boluarte "in defense of the Constitution and the rule of law". Subsequently, in 2023, Boluarte congratulated Sánchez on his re-election as prime minister.

===== Vatican City =====
In 2023, Dina Boluarte paid a visit to Vatican City. She met with Pope Francis to discuss cooperation between the Church and the State, and the meeting lasted half an hour. Channel TV Perú interpreted it as "an official act with strong symbolic content". However, congressman Carlos Anderson stated that Pope Francis did not show strong affection toward Boluarte and accused her of not morally representing the country during the visit. Francis died in 2025, and Peruvian foreign minister Elmer Schialer arrived at the Vatican to attend the supreme pontiff's funeral.

In 2025, Dina Boluarte welcomed the election of Pope Leo XIV, of American-Peruvian nationality. The Ombudsman's Office announced in a statement that "we join the voices of the continent that see in the new Pope an opportunity to strengthen the bonds of unity, solidarity and peace in the world". In May of that year, Boluarte traveled to meet Leo XIV and gave him a gold replica of the Cross of Motupe, which was in fact a gift from the Lambayeque delegation. In July, in her message to the Nation, Boluarte read a letter sent by Leo XIV while reiterating an invitation to the Pope to visit Peru.

=== On international conflicts ===
==== Russian-Ukrainian conflict ====
On February 23, 2023, Peru co-sponsored and voted in favor of the "Principles of the Charter of the United Nations underlying a comprehensive, just and lasting peace in Ukraine". On February 24, 2024, through a statement, the Peruvian government called for "a cessation of hostilities to open the way to dialogues leading to a diplomatic, peaceful, negotiated and lasting solution". On June 16, 2024, Foreign Minister Gonzalez-Olaechea proposed the formation of a group of facilitating countries, accepted by both Russia and Ukraine, to identify areas of consensus and work for vulnerable populations in the conflict. On February 7, 2025, Foreign Minister Schialler held a meeting with Andrii Sybiha, Ukraine's foreign minister, where they discussed strengthening relations between the two countries. After the death of José Ávila, a Peruvian citizen enlisted in the Ukrainian army, the Peruvian Foreign Ministry contacted the Ukrainian embassy in Peru to begin procedures to facilitate the transfer of the deceased's body.

==== Israel-Gaza conflict ====
On May 8, 2024, through a statement, the Peruvian government expressed "its deep concern over the beginning of Israel's military operations in the city of Rafah, Gaza Strip" and reiterated its call for the release of Israeli hostages held by Hamas and for a ceasefire as well as calling to "ensure unrestricted access to humanitarian aid to Gaza". Peru reaffirmed its adherence to the two-state solution, Israel and Palestine "coexisting peacefully within recognized and secure borders, in accordance with international law and resolutions issued by the United Nations". On February 3, 2025, Walid Muaqqat, Palestine's ambassador to Peru, was decorated with the Order of the Sun. On February 6, Peru spoke in favor of "the search for lasting peace in the Middle East on the basis of the two-state solution, and therefore hopes that negotiations will resume to achieve a political and final solution between Israel and Palestine in accordance with international law and resolutions issued by the United Nations". It also opposed forced displacement of the Palestinian population by Israel in the Gaza Strip. On July 23, 2025, Peru spoke in favor of "a ceasefire [in Gaza], the urgent provision of humanitarian assistance [to Gaza] and the release of [Israeli] hostages", joining the calls of the Secretary of the United Nations; it also rejected the construction of new Israeli settlements in West Bank and its adherence to Pope Leo XIV's call for dialogue and reconciliation in the region. After the Israeli bombing of Nasser Hospital in the city of Khan Yunis, a statement was issued condemning the events and rejecting announcements of expanded Israeli settlements in the West Bank and the occupation of Gaza City.

==== Iran-Israel conflict ====
On June 13, 2025, through a statement, the Peruvian government condemned the Israeli attack on Iran and called for de-escalation of the conflict without mentioning accusations against Iran of possessing nuclear material. In addition, it urged Peruvian citizens to postpone travel to the Middle East. Subsequently, after the Iranian attack on Israel, the Peruvian government condemned that act and urgently called for a ceasefire.

=== International trips ===
==== 2023 ====
Date	Country	Details	Image
7–9 August	Brazil	Protected by the law that authorizes her to govern remotely, Boluarte made her first international trip to the city of Belem do Para, Brazil, to participate in the Fourth Meeting of Presidents of the States Parties to the Amazon Cooperation Treaty. During the course of the activities, Boluarte met with Lula da Silva, the Brazilian president, with whom she spoke about bilateral trade, climate change, indigenous communities, and environmental protection. She later gave a speech at the Meeting and invited Da Silva to visit Peru; met with Sultan Ahmed Al Jaber, president of the United Nations Climate Change Conference (COP 28) and minister of industry and advanced technology of the United Arab Emirates; and Luhut Pandjaitan, coordinating minister for maritime affairs and investment of Indonesia, with whom she coordinated Zoom meetings between technical officials of that country and Peru to discuss promoting industrialization in Peru. In addition, Boluarte participated in meetings to analyze the Belem Declaration, which ended up being signed.	
17–21 September	United States	On 17 September, Boluarte arrived in New York to participate in the 78th UN General Assembly, after her trip was approved by Congress. During the activities, Boluarte participated in the Sustainable Development Goals (SDG) Summit, assuring Peru's commitment in that regard; met with Rodrigo Chaves, president of Costa Rica; participated in the dialogue of presidents to accelerate the implementation of the SDGs and in the United Nations plenary, where she gave a speech in which she called, among other things, for an international cooperation pact for immediate attention to meteorological phenomena.	
11–15 October	Germany, Italy and Vatican City	With authorization from Congress, Boluarte traveled to Germany, Italy and the Vatican. In Germany, as a guest for "Latin America Day", she met with Frank Nopper, mayor of Stuttgart, with whom she discussed technological innovation, coordination of SMEs, transport, and the environment. She then met with executives of Lateinamerika Verein and attended the meeting for that day organized by the business association for Latin America under the patronage of Winfried Kretschmann, minister-president of the federated state of Baden-Wurttemberg. From Stuttgart, Boluarte traveled to Berlin, where she met with Frank-Walter Steinmeier, president of Germany, and German businesspeople interested in mining, transport, and environmental infrastructure projects, whom she invited to invest in Peru. From Germany, Boluarte traveled to Italy and the Vatican. In the Vatican, Boluarte met with Pope Francis and Pietro Parolin, and they discussed relations between the Catholic Church and Peru, the sociopolitical situation in the region, migration, and climate change. In Rome, Boluarte met with Qu Dongyu, director-general of the Food and Agriculture Organization of the United Nations (FAO), whom Boluarte thanked for the technical assistance provided to her government and to farmers, and they discussed ways to improve farmers' productivity and incomes, with Dongyu mentioning the possibility of helping Peru through the FAO Hand-in-Hand Initiative.	
1–4 November	United States	With congressional approval, Boluarte was authorized to travel to Washington, D.C. and the state of Maryland to participate in the Inaugural Leaders' Summit of the Americas Partnership for Economic Prosperity (APEP). During it, Boluarte participated in a forum together with Gabriel Boric, president of Chile, and Guillermo Lasso, president of Ecuador. In addition, she met with Rodrigo Chaves, Luis Lacalle, president of Uruguay, and Ilan Goldfajn, president of the Inter-American Development Bank (IDB) and held a dialogue with senators and representatives of the United States Congress. Despite a bilateral meeting between Boluarte and Joe Biden, president of the United States, being announced, that meeting did not take place. Because of this, the minister of foreign affairs, Ana Gervasi, resigned from office.	
14–18 November	United States	Boluarte traveled, with congressional approval, to San Francisco to participate in the 30th Economic Leaders' Meeting of the Asia-Pacific Economic Cooperation (APEC) forum. During the activities, Boluarte met with the executives of Google, Visa, and Global Infrastructure Partners; participated in various APEC sessions; met with Kristalina Georgieva, director of the International Monetary Fund (IMF), Bongbong Marcos, president of the Philippines, and Vo Van Thuong, president of Vietnam; received the APEC pro tempore presidency from Joe Biden without having a bilateral meeting, although they spoke, at the time of the APEC transfer, about anti-narcotics efforts, the donation of Caltrain trains to the city of Lima, and cooperation with NASA; and invited business leaders to participate in the APEC 2024, to be held in Peru.	

==== 2024 ====
Date	Country	Details
23–30 June	China	Invited by the president of China, Xi Jinping, Boluarte traveled to the Asian country where she held a bilateral meeting in Beijing with Xi and signed cooperation agreements (see: state visit of Dina Boluarte to the People's Republic of China)

==== 2025 ====
Date	Country	Details	Image
20–24 January	Switzerland	After approval by Congress, Boluarte traveled to Davos to participate in the World Economic Forum 2025, where she gave a speech.	
16–19 May	Vatican City	With approval from Congress, Boluarte traveled to the Vatican to participate in the enthronement ceremony of Pope Leo XIV, who holds Peruvian nationality. During the activities, Boluarte participated in the Mass of honors in memory of Pope Francis and the enthronement Mass of Leo XIV	
24 May	Ecuador	Boluarte traveled to Quito for the inauguration ceremony of Daniel Noboa as president of that nation.	
7–11 June	France	Boluarte traveled to Nice to participate in the Third United Nations Ocean Conference (UNOC3), with approval from Congress. During those activities, Boluarte met with Mathias Cormann, secretary-general of the Organisation for Economic Co-operation and Development (OECD), with whom Boluarte reaffirmed Peru's commitment to work toward integrating into that organization; met with Rodrigo Chaves and Pham Minh Chinh, prime minister of Vietnam, who officially invited Boluarte to visit the Asian country, in addition to Emmanuel Macron, president of France, Rebeca Grynspan, secretary-general of the United Nations Conference on Trade and Development (UNCTAD) and Inger Andersen, executive director of the United Nations Environment Programme (UNEP). In addition, the Agreement on the Conservation and Sustainable Use of Marine Biodiversity beyond National Jurisdiction (BBNJ Agreement), also known as the "High Seas Treaty", was signed.	
5–12 August	Japan and Indonesia	After authorization from Congress, Boluarte traveled to Indonesia and Japan. In Japan, Boluarte met with more than 60 businesspeople, inaugurating the 16th Meeting of the Peru-Japanese Business Council (CEPEJA) and presenting various proposals to promote trade exchange and investment flows between both countries. In addition, the Firefighters Association of Japan donated 10 fire trucks that were handed over to Boluarte. While Boluarte was in Japan, the border conflict with Colombia took place, which gave rise to various criticisms. After statements by Gustavo Petro, president of Colombia, denying Peru's sovereignty over Santa Rosa Island (part of Isla Chineria), Boluarte authorized Prime Minister Eduardo Arana to issue a statement rejecting Petro's declarations and reaffirming Peruvian sovereignty over the island. She later gave a message to the nation from the eastern country, stating that "there is nothing pending with Colombia". In Japan, Boluarte met with Emperor Naruhito, with both speaking in Spanish. Naruhito thanked her for the welcome Boluarte gave Princess Kako in Peru in 2023. In addition, Boluarte met with Prime Minister Shigeru Ishiba, to whom she spoke about implementing a science and technology plan focused on robotics and artificial intelligence. On 10 August, Boluarte arrived in Indonesia, where she was received by Budi Santoso, Indonesian minister of trade, and Andra Soni, governor of Banten. In Indonesia, Boluarte met with Prabowo Subianto, president of the Asian country, with Kao Kim Hourn, secretary-general of the Association of Southeast Asian Nations (AESAN) and Puan Maharani, president of the People's Representative Council . With Subianto, Boluarte signed the Comprehensive Economic Partnership Agreement (CEPA) between Peru and Indonesia, through which tariffs were eliminated on 56% of Peruvian exports in various products, in addition to a memorandum of understanding being signed for cooperation in the fight against illicit drug trafficking. Previously, a phytosanitary protocol was signed for the export of Peruvian blueberries to Indonesia.	
21–25 September	United States	With authorization from Congress, Boluarte traveled to the United States to participate in the 80th session of the United Nations General Assembly. At the assembly, Boluarte spoke of reforming the UN, organized crime, climate change, and peace, in addition to speaking in Quechua. However, her speech, which was not translated into other languages, was interrupted because she exceeded the time limit while the microphone was off. Despite this, Boluarte continued speaking while Annalena Baerbock, president of the General Assembly, tried to conclude her intervention. Journalists, in order to capture what Boluarte was saying, had to rely on ambient audio. Finally, after the speech ended, Baerbock gave the floor to the representative of Slovenia. In addition, she met with the crown prince of Kuwait, Sabah Khaled Al-Hamad Al-Mubarak Al-Sabah; Antonio Guterres, secretary-general of the United Nations, to whom she expressed her annoyance at the statements of Volker Türk, high commissioner of the United Nations for human rights, regarding the Amnesty Law; Bart De Weber, prime minister of Belgium; Lula da Silva; and participated in a meeting with the America Society / Council of the Americas (AS/COA), the Adam Smith Center for Economic Freedom, and the Business Council Alliance for Ibero-America, whom she invited to invest in Peru.	

==== Rejected trips ====
- On 17 September 2024, Congress rejected Boluarte's request to travel to the United States to participate in the High-level Week of the Seventy-ninth Session of the United Nations General Assembly.
- After the death of Pope Francis, Boluarte requested authorization from Congress to travel to the Pope's funeral rites, a request that was rejected on 24 April 2025.

== Opinion polling ==
=== Presidential approval ===
Trend lines of Dina Boluarte's approval and disapproval polling.

Pollster / media outlet	Date	Sample	Dina Boluarte (President of the Republic)			
Pollster / media outlet	Date	Sample	App.	Disapp.	DK/NA	Diff.
Ipsos Perú/América	25–26 Sep 2025	1220	3	96	1	−93
IEP/La República	19–24 Sep 2025	1202	3	93	4	−90
CPI	11–17 Sep 2025	1200	2.5	93.8	3.8	−91.3
Ipsos Perú/América	28–29 Aug 2025	1208	4	93	3	−89
Datum Internacional/El Comercio	8–12 Aug 2025	1206	3	96	1	−93
Activa/Pulso Ciudadano	1–7 Aug 2025	800	6.2	89.7	4.1	−83.5
CPI/RPP	18–24 Jul 2025	1200	2.1	97.0	0.9	−94.9
IEP/La República	17–22 Jul 2025	1206	2.5	93.9	3.6	−91.4
Ipsos Perú/Perú21	3–4 Jul 2025	1208	3	94	3	−91
Datum Internacional/El Comercio	6–10 Jun 2025	1203	3	94	3	−91
Activa/Pulso Ciudadano	2–9 Jun 2025	829	5.3	88.4	6.3	−83.1
Ipsos Perú/Perú21	5–6 Jun 2025	1206	4	93	3	−89
CPI/RPP	15–23 May 2025	1200	2.4	95.9	1.7	−93.5
IEP/La República	15–21 May 2025	1203	3.6	93.6	2.8	−90.0
Ipsos Perú/Perú21	8–9 May 2025	1207	2	94	4	−92
Ipsos Perú/Perú21	13–14 Apr 2025	1206	3	94	3	−91
Datum Internacional/El Comercio	4–9 Apr 2025	1203	4	94	2	−90
Activa/Pulso Ciudadano	1–9 Apr 2025	806	5.4	90.5	4.1	−85.1
IEP/La República	20–26 Mar 2025	1203	4	93	3	−89
Datum Internacional/El Comercio	7–11 Mar 2025	1208	4	93	3	−89
Ipsos Perú/Perú21	6–7 Mar 2025	1206	4	92	4	−88
Activa/Pulso Ciudadano	6–13 Feb 2025	806	6.4	88.3	5.3	−81.9
Ipsos Perú/Perú21	6–7 Feb 2025	1202	4	91	5	−87
Datum Internacional/El Comercio	31 Jan–5 Feb 2025	1204	4	94	2	−90
IEP	16–22 Jan 2025	1207	6	90	4	−84
Ipsos Perú/Perú21	9–10 Jan 2025	1214	5	92	3	−87
Datum Internacional/El Comercio	6–10 Dec 2024	1222	3	95	2	−92
Ipsos Perú/América	5–6 Dec 2024	1203	4	91	5	−87
Activa/Pulso Ciudadano	20–28 Nov 2024	824	7.5	86.6	5.9	−79.1
IEP/La República	15–20 Nov 2024	1206	5	91	4	−86
CPI/RPP	15–20 Nov 2024	1200	5.1	89.5	5.4	−84.4
Datum Internacional/El Comercio	7–11 Nov 2024	1204	3	94	3	−91
Ipsos Perú/Perú21	7–8 Nov 2024	1204	4	91	5	−87
Ipsos Perú/América	10–11 Oct 2024	1211	4	92	4	−88
Datum Internacional/El Comercio	4–8 Oct 2024	1218	5	92	3	−87
Activa/Pulso Ciudadano	18–26 Sep 2024	823	6.3	85.8	7.9	−79.5
IEP/La República	20–25 Sep 2024	1205	5	90	5	−85
Datum Internacional/El Comercio	6–10 Sep 2024	1211	6	91	3	−85
Ipsos Perú/Perú21	5–6 Sep 2024	1210	6	90	4	−84
Ipsos Perú/América	8–9 Aug 2024	1205	6	89	5	−83
IEP/La República	2–7 Aug 2024	1205	6	88	6	−82
Datum Internacional/El Comercio	2–6 Aug 2024	1207	6	91	3	−85
CPI	15–19 Jul 2024	1370	7.1	89.2	3.7	−82.1
Ipsos Perú/Perú21	17–18 Jul 2024	1218	7	88	5	−81
IEP/La República	1–5 Jul 2024	1204	5	90	5	−85
Ipsos Perú/América	4–7 Jun 2024	1206	6	90	4	−84
Datum Internacional/El Comercio	1–4 Jun 2024	1208	5	91	4	−86
CPI	27 May–2 Jun 2024	1200	8.1	88.2	3.7	−80.1
IEP/La República	18–23 May 2024	1227	5	90	5	−85
Ipsos Perú/Perú21	9–10 May 2024	1206	7	88	5	−81
Activa/Pulso Ciudadano	3–9 May 2024	872	8.1	82.7	9.2	−74.6
Datum Internacional/El Comercio	5–8 Apr 2024	1209	7	88	5	−81
Ipsos Perú/América	4–5 Apr 2024	1206	8	86	6	−78
Ipsos Perú/Perú21	21–22 Mar 2024	1206	9	88	3	−79
IEP/La República	16–21 Mar 2024	1207	7.8	86.3	5.9	−78.5
Imasen/Pulso Regional	3–13 Mar 2024	10800	6.4	89.4	4.2	−83.0
Activa/Pulso Ciudadano	1–5 Mar 2024	822	9.7	81.3	9.0	−71.6
Datum Internacional/El Comercio	1–4 Mar 2024	1214	10	85	5	−75
CPI	7–16 Feb 2024	1200	9.6	83.7	6.7	−74.1
Ipsos Perú/América	8–9 Feb 2024	1207	8	83	9	−75
Datum Internacional/El Comercio	3–6 Feb 2024	1208	10	83	7	−73
IEP/La República	19–24 Jan 2024	1208	8.3	82.4	9.3	−74.1
Ipsos Perú/Perú21	11–12 Jan 2024	1217	9	83	8	−74
Datum Internacional/El Comercio	6–9 Jan 2024	1210	10	85	5	−75
Activa/Pulso Ciudadano	2–8 Jan 2024	807	9.5	79.0	11.5	−69.5
IEP/La República	8–10 Dec 2023	1210	9.3	84.1	6.6	−74.8
Ipsos Perú/América	6–7 Dec 2023	1215	9	84	7	−75
Datum Internacional/El Comercio	1–6 Dec 2023	1207	9	85	6	−76
IEP/La República	18–23 Nov 2023	1213	7.5	85.1	7.4	−77.6
CPI	13–18 Nov 2023	1200	9.4	84.3	6.3	−74.9
Activa/Pulso Ciudadano	8–17 Nov 2023	807	7.3	82.5	10.1	−75.2
Ipsos Perú/Perú21	9–10 Nov 2023	1209	10	83	7	−73
Datum Internacional/El Comercio	3–7 Nov 2023	1215	11	84	5	−73
IEP/La República	21–26 Oct 2023	1203	9.9	84.0	6.1	−74.1
Ipsos Perú/América	12–13 Oct 2023	1211	14	80	6	−66
Datum Internacional	30 Sep–3 Oct 2023	1216	15	81	4	−66
IEP/La República	16–20 Sep 2023	1210	10.1	81.8	8.1	−71.7
Activa/Pulso Ciudadano	6–15 Sep 2023	802	11.8	78.4	9.8	−66.6
Datum Internacional	8–12 Sep 2023	1210	15	80	5	−65
Ipsos Perú/Perú21	7–8 Sep 2023	1213	16	76	8	−60
IEP/La República	19–24 Aug 2023	1207	10.5	79.0	10.6	−68.5
Ipsos Perú/América	10–11 Aug 2023	1213	14	79	7	−65
Datum Internacional	4–7 Aug 2023	1218	16	77	7	−61
Latinobarómetro	21 Jul 2023	?	15	83	2	−68
IEP/La República	15–19 Jul 2023	1206	10.9	81.6	7.5	−70.7
Activa/Pulso Ciudadano	11–19 Jul 2023	809	10.5	71.6	17.9	−61.1
CPI/RPP	11–15 Jul 2023	1200	14.4	80.5	5.2	−66.1
Ipsos Perú/Perú21	13–14 Jul 2023	1206	14	79	7	−65
Datum Internacional	30 Jun–4 Jul 2023	1230	15	77	8	−62
IEP/La República	17–22 Jun 2023	1209	12	80	8	−68
Ipsos Perú/América	8–9 Jun 2023	1205	14	77	9	−63
Datum Internacional	3–7 Jun 2023	1203	17	77	6	−60
IEP/La República	20–25 May 2023	1212	15	79	6	−64
Activa/Pulso Ciudadano	17–23 May 2023	814	13.8	73.0	13.2	−59.2
Ipsos Perú/Perú21	11–12 May 2023	1206	16	75	9	−59
Datum Internacional	6–9 May 2023	1210	18	76	6	−58
CPI	23–28 Apr 2023	1200	16.2	76.9	6.9	−60.7
IEP/La República	22–27 Apr 2023	1202	15	79	6	−64
Ipsos Perú/América	13–14 Apr 2023	1207	15	77	8	−62
Datum Internacional	10–12 Apr 2023	1200	18	74	8	−56
Activa/Pulso Ciudadano	20–27 Mar 2023	849	15.9	72.1	12.1	−56.2
Ipsos Perú/Perú21	25–26 Mar 2023	1210	17	76	7	−59
IEP/La República	18–22 Mar 2023	1220	15	78	7	−63
CPI	7–10 Mar 2023	1200	20.1	71.6	8.2	−51.5
Datum Internacional	3–7 Mar 2023	1200	19	74	7	−55
IEP/La República	18–22 Feb 2023	1201	15	77	8	−62
Ipsos Perú/América	9–10 Feb 2023	1210	18	74	8	−56
Datum/Perú21/Gestión	3–7 Feb 2023	1204	16	76	8	−60
CPI/RPP	24–27 Jan 2023	1200	21.2	70.6	8.2	−49.4
IEP/La República	21–25 Jan 2023	1214	17	76	7	−59
Activa/Pulso Ciudadano	17–23 Jan 2023	800	18.1	66.2	15.7	−48.1
Ipsos Perú/Perú21	12–13 Jan 2023	1199	20	71	9	−51
IEP/La República	7–12 Jan 2023	1211	19	71	10	−52
Ipsos Perú/América	15–16 Dec 2022	1216	21	68	11	−47
IEP/La República	9–14 Dec 2022	1216	27	71	2	−44

==== Particular cases ====
The newspaper El Comercio, based on surveys obtained up to December 2023, indicated that Boluarte's first year had the lowest approval rating in the last 20 years.

In 2023, Ipsos conducted the XIX Survey of Chief Executive Officers, in which Boluarte received 71% approval from the leading representatives of the national business sector. In the Latinobarómetro of that year, she had an 83% disapproval rating, the second highest in Latin America.

In 2024, in the XX Survey of Chief Executive Officers, Boluarte lost support from the business sector, receiving 12%. Meanwhile, the consulting firm CID Gallup reported that the political figure had 6% approval, the lowest among 12 presidents in Latin America.

In 2025, unofficial information from an Ipsos survey was leaked in which Dina Boluarte's popularity had reached 0% compared with other presidential candidates who were not revealed at the request of electoral authorities.

According to surveys conducted at the end of 2025, Boluarte's removal from office was evaluated as the most positive event of that year by a majority of Peruvians. In the survey conducted by Datum for El Comercio, 29% of respondents considered the removal of Boluarte to be the most positive event of 2025; while, in the survey conducted by Ipsos Peru for Perú21, 47% of respondents considered it among the three most positive events of the year, obtaining the highest percentage among the events considered. In addition, in both surveys, Boluarte received the highest preferences as the most negative figure of 2025.

== Controversies ==
=== Campaign financing irregularities ===
On 28 March, provincial prosecutor Richard Rojas included President Dina Boluarte, former president Pedro Castillo, and businessman Henry Shimabukuro in a criminal organization investigation over alleged illicit contributions during the Peru Libre party's campaign in the 2021 general election. Shimabukuro was allegedly responsible for illegal financing through the "Ranchito Dina Boluarte", a dining facility used to provide food for Peru Libre supporters.

=== Change of IRTP leadership ===
In 2023, the then executive president of IRTP, Jesús Solari Díaz, resigned from his post, stating that his efforts to provide inclusive and plurinational programming in state media had been obstructed by the dominant political class. He was replaced by Ninoska Chandia, who until then had served as press chief for the government of Dina Boluarte. Hugo Coya said that Chandia had been part of the Strategic Communications team, highlighted only her brief presence as a reporter on Radio Nacional, and stated that her appointment "is definitely a setback of at least two decades in that effort to seek a public television service".

Chandia's tenure was marked by questioned actions. Initially, the company covered travel expenses for the president and the general manager to establish agreements with other countries for obtaining new technologies. She was also alleged to have allowed herself to be absent while undergoing surgeries, as her husband admitted, and promoted her alma mater, César Vallejo University, in institutional videos. Later, the minister of culture said that Chandia's management was investigated after allegations of embezzlement and personal favoritism were revealed.

Most of the IRTP board was eliminated by supreme decree in order to "eliminate duplicate functions", leaving two people as the top officials: the director and the general manager. Its employees were also replaced. Among those dismissed was Féliz Paz Quiróz, the director of Editora Perú, a print-media company attached to the Presidency of the Council of Ministers. In June 2023, IRTP dismissed Ximena Carrasco, a journalist who had questioned Boluarte during the social unrest. Carrasco said that the dismissal amounted to an "informality by the State" in the termination of her contract. The weekly Hildebrandt en sus Trece revealed that the political situation of the state press was already known when, in the words of El Comercio, it "reported at the time that the government had acknowledged before the Inter-American Commission on Human Rights (IACHR) police and military responsibility for the deaths during the social unrest of the preceding months". Carrasco's questioning of the Boluarte government "was one of the first episodes that triggered increasingly harsh pressure against IRTP", coinciding with the dismissal of journalists not aligned with the government.

Former minister Ana Jara described this as a "disguised dismissal", citing two case files (114-2001-AA/TC and 00976-2001-AA/TC) from the jurisprudence of the Constitutional Court. Rodrigo Salazar, executive director of the CPP, warned that "we can now, with considerable evidence, doubt what we see or hear on TV Perú and Radio Nacional" after confirming the dismissal of seven journalists within a month of Chandia taking office.

Labour Minister Fernando Varela acknowledged that he had no information about the dismissals, since no complaint had been filed with Sunafil. Days later, in July of that year, the outlet El Foco revealed new audio recordings implicating the removal of twenty people from the broadcasting organization. In November of that year, Sudaca reported another forced dismissal: journalist María de Jesús Gonzales, after 22 years working at the company, allegedly at the request of the presidential secretariat. In December 2024, after seven journalists had already been dismissed, journalist Nicolás Salazar, who had worked at IRTP for 12 years, resigned after stating that "the current management took away my desire to do journalism".

IRTP took censorship measures against cultural content. In July 2023 it suspended the broadcast of Sunday Mass on TV Perú after criticism of Boluarte over the deaths during the unrest by the Archbishop of Lima, Carlos Castillo, during the Independence Day special. The following month, in August, IRTP canceled several Radio Nacional programs without prior notice, including the long-running program La voz del consumidor hosted by Crisólogo Cáceres. In September, the state company announced the cancellation of El placer de los ojos, hosted by Ricardo Bedoya and on air for more than 20 years.

IRTP also took other actions aimed at promoting a favorable public image of Dina Boluarte. In November 2023, it released a song intended to mitigate future social unrest, which was criticized by actress Tatiana Astengo. In 2025, it hired a former press chief for Fuerza Popular during its 2016 presidential campaign and launched a program promoting Andean customs from "a paranormal and scientific point of view", hosted by one of the promoters of the Nazca tridactyl mummies, on the grounds of "generating critical thinking in the audience". The news program Panorama reported that the institute planned to launch a Sunday program hosted by Dina Boluarte herself to compete with private television.

Ninoska Chandía resigned from IRTP in June 2025 and was temporarily replaced by Rossella Leiblinger. The head of investigations at Panorama said that Chandía had in fact been chosen because of her ties to Nicanor Boluarte, the president's brother, and stated that she resigned because of disagreements between the Boluarte siblings. In August of that year, the government appointed Adriana Rodríguez, who had served as press chief for former interior minister Juan José Santiváñez, as head of IRTP. Rodríguez resigned three months later, when José Jerí assumed the presidency of the republic.

=== Official meetings abroad ===
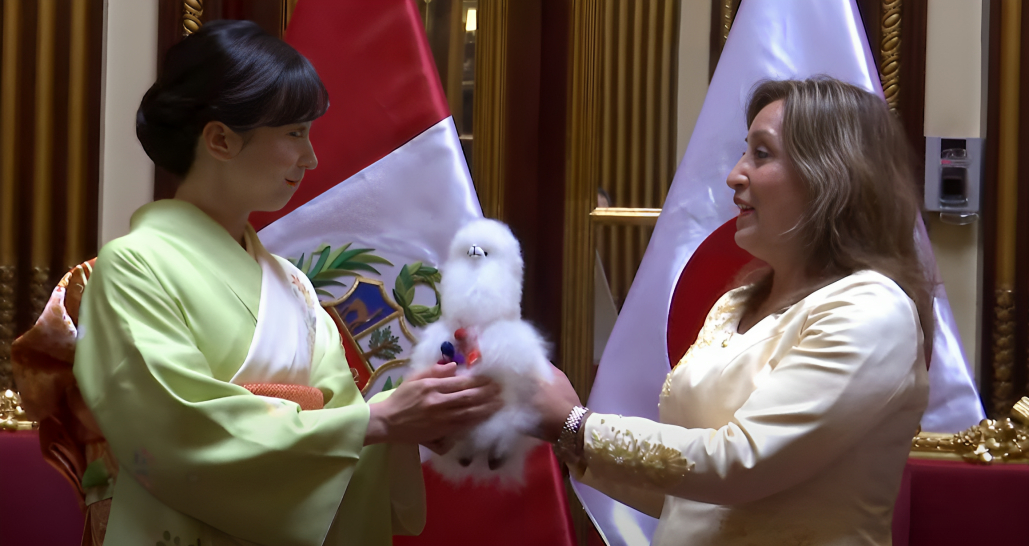
Boluarte presenting a gift to Princess Kako of Akishino during an official visit.

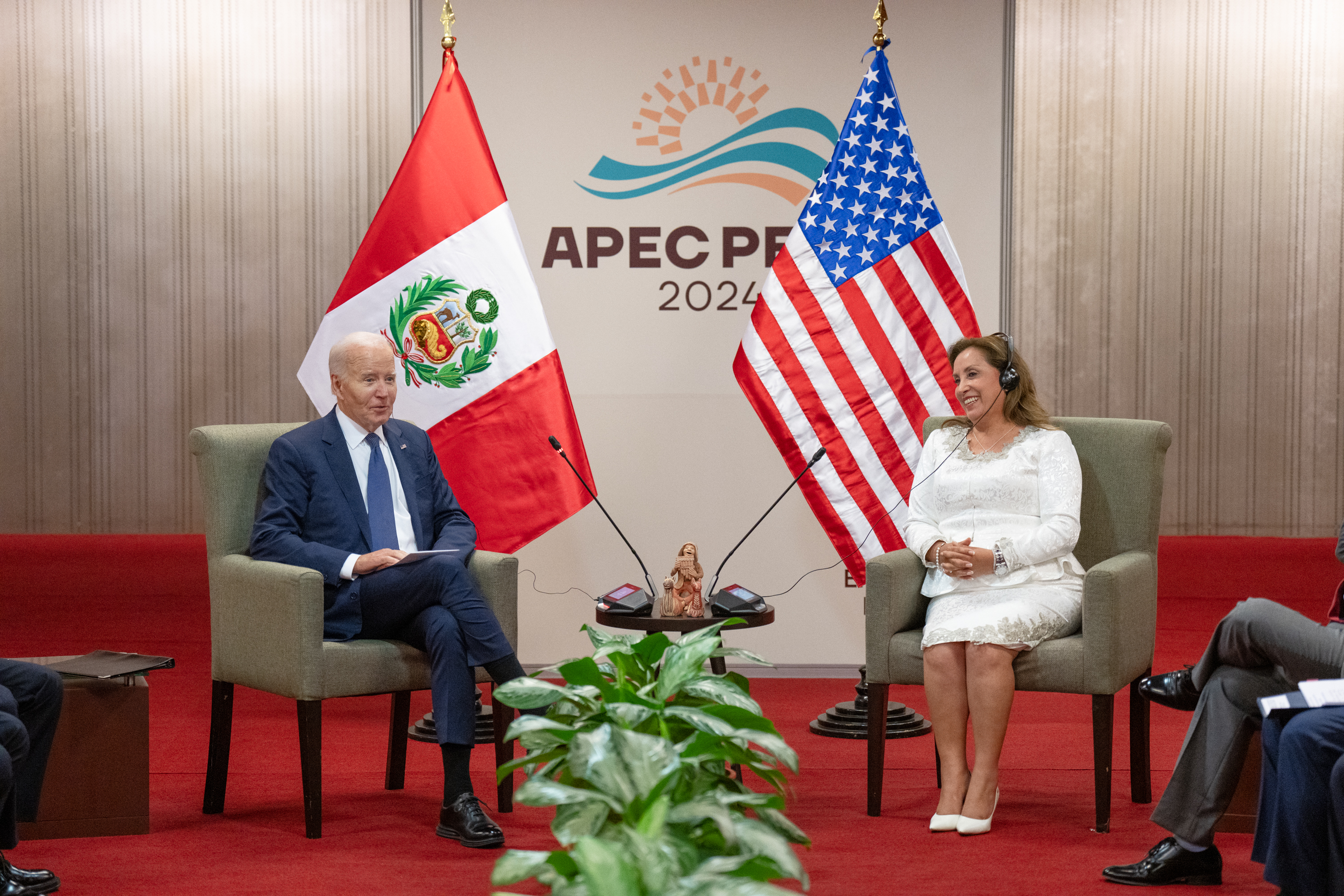
Boluarte with U.S. President Joe Biden at APEC 2024.

During Dina Boluarte's visit to the sessions of the United Nations General Assembly in the United States, a publicity campaign was carried out that included photographs with public officials and the use of the Brand Peru promotional campaign to attract investors. This included a purported official meeting with U.S. President Joe Biden based on a photograph, which was denied by the White House.

Analysts such as Karla Gaviño and Anthony Medina Rivas Plata noted the absence of official meetings with foreign leaders during the promotional campaign. Political analyst Francisco Belaunde suggested that the lack of investor engagement was due to distrust stemming from the weak rule of law in Peru.

Boluarte and her ministers also traveled for four days to Germany, Italy, and Vatican City without securing international commitments despite spending one million soles. Days later, a supposed encounter with Biden during the Americas Partnership for Economic Prosperity was again included in a request to Congress, although official sources did not consider it a bilateral meeting. Former ambassador Carlos Pareja described the brief encounter as a pull aside.

In June 2024, Boluarte acknowledged that she did not know English, a language used in many countries around the world.

In April 2025, the parties Fuerza Popular and Alliance for Progress voted mostly in favor of allowing Dina Boluarte to travel again to the Vatican for the funeral of Pope Francis. However, the motion did not receive enough votes. Boluarte instead held her own mass at the Government Palace.

=== Rolex scandal ===
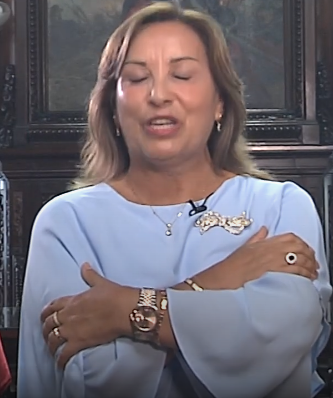
Boluarte in December 2023, wearing a Rolex Datejust

In March 2024, the Public Ministry of Peru began investigating Boluarte for graft and illicit enrichment after she was seen wearing luxury Rolex watches at public events, with the controversy being dubbed "Rolexgate". Boluarte's use of Rolex watches was first reported by news website La Encerrona on 14 March 2024; the website reviewed about 10,000 images and detailed how her watches became increasingly luxurious as her time in public office progressed. Reviewing La Encerrona's work, the Associated Press noted that one of the Rolex watches Boluarte used was three times her monthly salary.

When asked about her watches at a press conference on 15 March, Boluarte said "what I have is the result of my effort and my work". While Boluarte said that the Rolex watch was a dated model, La República contacted an American watch store that said the model was possibly from 2023 and valued it at US$19,535, with the newspaper saying that Boluarte's response was "an alleged contradiction". Days later, Henry Shimabukuro, a businessman who assisted with Boluarte's political campaign, said that assistants for Boluarte suggested gifts of jewelry when meeting with her.

A preliminary investigation was opened by the Public Ministry on 18 March 2024 to investigate Boluarte on allegations of illicit enrichment. The Financial Intelligence Unit of the Superintendency of Banks and Insurance Companies (SBS) said that Boluarte received 1.1 million Peruvian soles (US$330,000) from unidentified accounts between 2016 and 2022, according to a report by El Comercio on 25 March. On 29 March, La Republica identified a Cartier bracelet used by Boluarte that was 18 carat gold, covered with 204 diamonds and had an estimated value of more than US$54,000.

On 30 March 2024, about 20 police and 20 public ministry officials raided Boluarte's home in Surquillo, breaking down her door with a sledgehammer while saying their involvement was "for the purpose of search and seizure." After searching her home, the authorities then entered the Government Palace for further investigations; Boluarte was present. Boluarte's prime minister, Gustavo Adrianzén, condemned the actions of authorities, stating "The political noise that is being made is serious, affecting investments and the entire country... What has happened in the last few hours are disproportionate and unconstitutional actions." Six ministers of her new cabinet resigned following the incident.

=== Detention of Iván Quispe Palomino ===
In October 2024, Prime Minister Gustavo Adrianzén announced the detention of Iván Quispe Palomino, brother of the terrorist Víctor Quispe Palomino. The detention generated controversy because Iván Quispe had not recently had any connection to his family's criminal activities, yet the government announced him as a "terrorist and criminal delinquent". He was released by the judiciary days later after it was determined that he was "a different person from the wanted Víctor Quispe Palomino".

Days later, Quispe Palomino filed a lawsuit against Gustavo Adrianzén and Juan Santiváñez over the moral and psychological harm allegedly caused to him and his family, as well as the damage to his life plans and functioning in his social environment.

=== Retirement of General Víctor Canales ===
Army General Víctor Canales was retired by the government effective 1 January 2025, despite the appeal he filed. Canales said that there was no reason to remove him, and that his retirement was instead a response to political interests, under which the armed forces tend to align themselves with the executive.

When Canales was still in the military, an alleged telephone conversation with Lina Sánchez, secretary to former defense minister Emilio Gustavo Bobbio, was leaked in the "alternative press". In the recording, she says that there had been a conspiracy to remove Pedro Castillo, involving military officers, "caviares" and "terrucos", and mentions names such as Jorge Chávez Cresta, Romero Bombansi, General Manuel Gómez de la Torre, General David Ojeda, Aníbal Torres, Bettsy Chávez, Jorge Montoya and José Williams. In January 2025, retired General Víctor Canales stated, "I saw that certain figures entered the scene who, later on, we have all seen occupying ministerial posts in this government", and confirmed that he was willing to testify before prosecutors about what occurred on 7 December 2022.

On 20 December 2024, in his farewell speech to the Coronel Francisco Bolognesi Artillery Group, based in Arequipa, he urged officers and soldiers to maintain their honor and loyalty in the face of adversity, summarizing it in the phrase, "Respect the laws, respect your military leaders, and never stain your hands either with the blood of innocents or with money from the virus of corruption." Military sources consulted by La República stated that speeches such as General Canales's had not been seen in the army for a long time, reinforcing the perception that his message was neither casual nor improvised.

The general said that his "retirement is an act of revenge" because he had been serving as military adviser to minister Gustavo Bobbio when Pedro Castillo's attempted self-coup took place on 7 December 2022, making him a crucial witness to what happened internally. In a later interview with La República, the former general suggested that responsibility for all the deaths that occurred during the social protests, including those in Ayacucho and Juliaca, reached President Dina Boluarte, who acted as the first link in the chain of command. He also said that there is a long-standing corrupt practice in army promotions, whereby those who align themselves and remain loyal receive senior posts, while those who do not are retired despite their merits.

=== Alleged surveillance of opponents ===
In December 2024, former prime minister Alberto Otárola stated: "The president of the Republic underwent a surgical procedure on the dates indicated, but in this procedure, as happens to anyone, she was not neglecting the duties corresponding to the office, and I know this because I was president of the Council of Ministers." In response, President Dina Boluarte called Otárola a "coward" for making her operation public, to which the former prime minister replied that "the president should replace the verb to hate with the verb to govern". Shortly afterward, Alberto Otárola revealed on social media that he had been the victim for several months of surveillance by "intelligence apparatuses", and stated that he had filed a complaint and requested protections for his personal and family safety.

Retired Colonel Harvey Colchado, who had been forced into retirement by the government, was due to give a lecture on criminal networks on 25 January 2025 at the National University of San Marcos, but it was suspended at the last minute for "administrative reasons". The next day, Colchado said that he had received information from police and civilian sources warning him that his movements were being monitored, stating, "They tell me to be careful because they want to victimize me." He also said that his retirement occurred because of his refusal to support the president's brother, and that there is a "corrupt pact" between the executive and legislative branches.

=== Appointment of prefects by Boluarte's inner circle ===
By 2025, Infobae, citing local sources, reported that people close to Boluarte occupied prefect positions. Nicanor Boluarte placed 63 people linked to his party Ciudadanos por el Perú, while the governor of La Libertad, César Acuña, had 140.

=== Use of legal defense funds ===
In May 2025, the weekly Hildebrandt en sus Trece reported that Dina Boluarte's government had allocated two million soles for her legal defense and that of senior officials. Ojo Público stated that, from the government's first days through that month, 36.2 million soles had been allocated, 77% of it through mechanisms that do not require public accounting, such as service orders.

=== Increase in the presidential salary ===
In 2025, the Presidency of the Council of Ministers proposed raising the salary of the president of Peru from 16,000 to 35,500 soles per month, reportedly for the purpose of aligning it with the salaries of presidents in neighboring countries. The PCM declined to reveal the technical reasons for the increase to the press, saying the information was confidential. It later became known that the proposal had come from the presidential office. Sources close to the Sunday program Panorama said that Dina Boluarte became upset and took measures to identify the leakers.

Boluarte's new salary was made official by supreme decree in early July 2025. The presidential salary was thus fixed at 35,568 soles, 222% of the previous salary.

According to a survey by the Instituto de Estudios Peruanos, 94% of respondents opposed the proposed salary increase, while only 4% supported it. Support was highest in the A/B socioeconomic sector, at 6%.
