= 2025 Cajamarca regional strike =

Strikes in Cajamarca, Peru

- Part of 2025 Peruvian protests
- Date: October 6, 2025 - October 10, 2025 (4 days)
- Location: Cajamarca, Peru
- Caused by: Unfinished roads and the Jaen airport; Illegal mining in Peru
- Goals: Impeachment of Dina Boluarte
- Status: The strike is lifted following the impeachment of Dina Boluarte.

Parties
Protesters; Transport collectives	(Peru) Presidency of Dina Boluarte

Lead figures
Domiciano Gonzáles; Wincler Delgado; Johan Fernández	(Peru) Dina Boluarte

Units involved
Rondas campesinas	Peruvian government; National Police of Peru; (Peru) Peruvian Army

The 2025 Cajamarca regional strike began on October 6 in the Cajamarca in Peru, called by Rondas campesinas in protest against insecurity, the abandonment of infrastructure works and the fight against illegal mining.

== Timeline ==
=== 1 October ===
In Jaén The Rondas Campesinas and Transport collectives called a regional strike for 6 October, The representative of the M1 transporters, Wincler Delgado, confirmed the participation of the M1, M2 and M3 transport units.

The president of the Federación de Rondas Campesinas de Cajamarca, Johan Fernández, specified that the platform of struggle focuses on the demand to complete the Longitudinal Highway of the Sierra in its sections Chiple–Cutervo–Cochabamba, Lajas–Chota, Bambamarca–Cajamarca, Cajabamba–Cajamarca, Chota–Chongoyape y Cutervo–Cuyca.

=== 6 October ===
Blockades were reported on the Chiple – Cutervo highway and Bellavista – Jaén highway, in Cutervo Rondas Campesinas identified and detained undercover police officers, the National Police of Peru have deployed patrol operations.

=== 7 October ===
The secretary of the Federación Regional de Rondas Campesinas de Cajamarca, Juan Carlos Guevara, pointed out that the regional strike called had a significant impact.

=== 8 October ===
Protesters blocked important areas such as Chiple (Cutervo), Chamaya (Jaén) and Bellavista (San Ignacio).

=== 9 October ===
A leader of the Rondas campesinas from San Ignacio confirmed that the seven peasant federations remain firm in their struggle and warned that the protest will become more radical in a few hours.

=== 10 October ===
The suspension of the indefinite regional strike in Cajamarca was announced by the Frente de Defensa de los Intereses y Patrimonio de Cutervo, after the Impeachment of Dina Boluarte, but according to statements by Domiciano Gonzáles, president of the Federación Subregional de Rondas Campesinas, the roads between Jaén and Chamaya remain closed.
