= Raúl Pérez-Reyes =

Peruvian politician (born 1965)

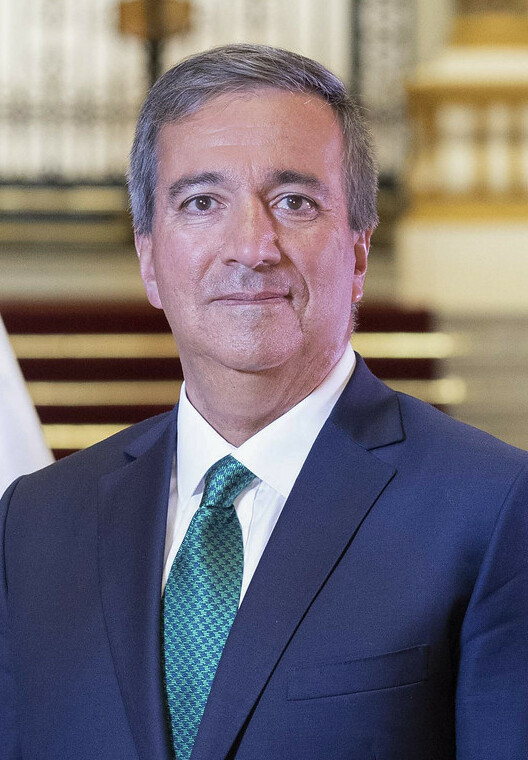
- Pérez-Reyes in 2023

Minister of Economy and Finance
- In office 13 May 2025 – 10 October 2025
- President: Dina Boluarte
- Prime Minister: Eduardo Arana Ysa
- Preceded by: José Salardi
- Succeeded by: Denisse Miralles

Minister of Transport and Communications
- In office 6 September 2023 – 13 May 2025
- President: Dina Boluarte
- Prime Minister: Alberto Otárola; Gustavo Adrianzén
- Preceded by: Paola Lazarte
- Succeeded by: César Sandoval

Minister of Production
- In office 26 January 2023 – 6 September 2023
- President: Dina Boluarte
- Prime Minister: Alberto Otárola
- Preceded by: Sandra Belaunde Arnillas
- Succeeded by: Ana María Choquehuanca
- In office 30 April 2018 – 11 March 2019
- President: Martín Vizcarra
- Prime Minister: César Villanueva
- Preceded by: Daniel Córdova Cayo
- Succeeded by: Rocío Barrios

Personal details
- Born: 3 July 1965 (age 60)
- Party: Independent

Raúl Ricardo Pérez-Reyes Espejo (born 3 July 1965) is a Peruvian politician serving as minister of economy and finance since 2025. From 2023 to 2025, he served as minister of transport and communications. From 2018 to 2019 and from January to September 2023, he served as minister of production.
