= Leslie Urteaga =

Peruvian politician

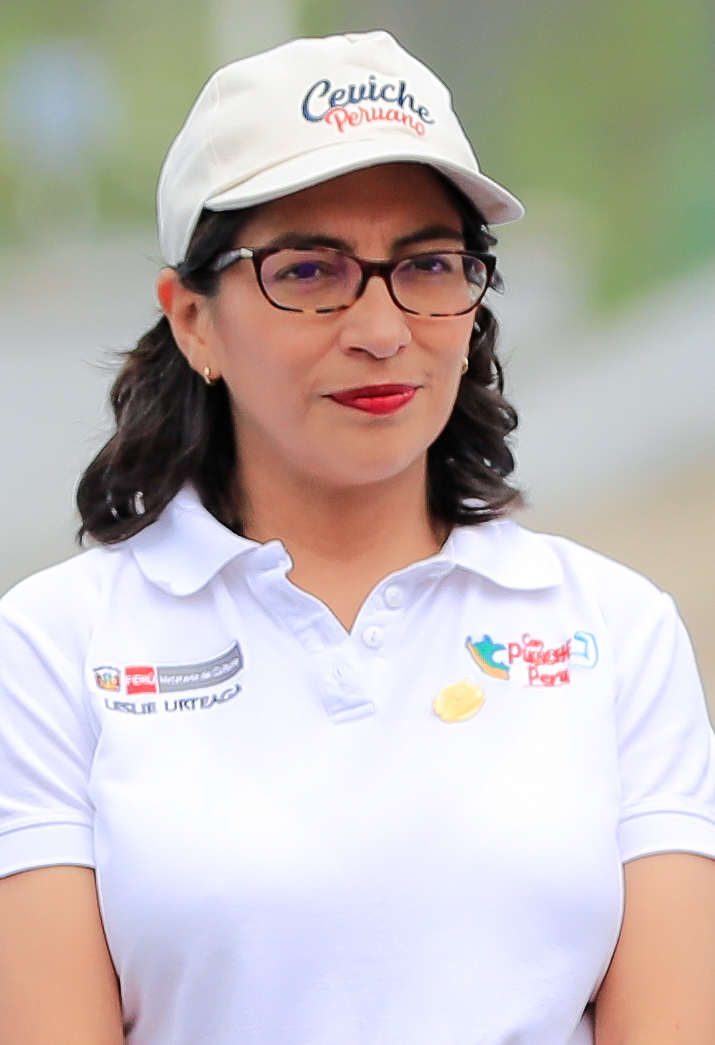
- Urteaga in 2023

Minister of Development and Social Inclusion
- In office 31 January 2025 – 23 August 2025
- President: Dina Boluarte
- Prime Minister: Gustavo Adrianzén; Eduardo Arana Ysa
- Preceded by: Julio Demartini
- Succeeded by: Fanny Montellanos

Minister of Culture
- In office 21 December 2022 – 3 September 2024
- President: Dina Boluarte
- Prime Minister: Alberto Otárola; Gustavo Adrianzén
- Preceded by: Jair Pérez Brañez
- Succeeded by: Fabricio Valencia

Personal details
- Party: Independent

Leslie Carol Urteaga Peña is a Peruvian politician serving as minister of development and social inclusion in 2025. From 2022 to 2024, she served as minister of culture.
