= Liliana La Rosa =

Peruvian nurse, politicianm and academic (born 1964)

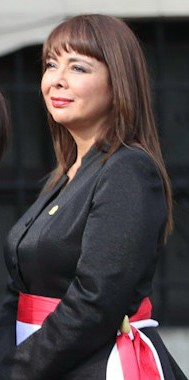

Minister of Development and Social Inclusion of Peru
- In office 2 April 2018 – 11 March 2019
- President: Martín Vizcarra
- Preceded by: Jorge Meléndez Celis
- Succeeded by: Paola Bustamante

Personal details
- Born: Liliana del Carmen La Rosa Huertas; 30 May 1964 (age 62) Huacho District, Peru
- Party: Broad Front (2016–2018)
- Education: José Faustino Sánchez Carrión National University; Universidad Nacional Federico Villarreal; Pontifical Catholic University of Peru; University of Chile
- Occupation: Nurse, academic

Liliana del Carmen La Rosa Huertas (born 30 May 1964) is a Peruvian nurse and academic specializing in public policy. She was Minister of Development and Social Inclusion of Peru from 2 April 2018 to 11 March 2019, during the government of Martín Vizcarra.

== Biography ==
Liliana La Rosa was born in Huacho District on 30 May 1964, the daughter of Alfonsa Huertas and Andrés La Rosa. Her primary and secondary education took place at the Colegio Santa Rosa de las Madres Dominicas del Rosario. In 1981 she entered José Faustino Sánchez Carrión National University, part of its first Nursing class, which she attended for two semesters.

She then entered Universidad Nacional Federico Villarreal's Children's Hospital Nursing School in Lima, from which she earned a baccalaureate and licentiate in nursing.

== Professional studies ==
In 1989 and 1990, La Rosa completed a Diploma of Sociological Studies at the Pontifical Catholic University of Peru (PUCP), and in 1991 she entered the Master of Community Health program with mention in Maternal Childhood and Population at Cayetano Heredia University (UPCH). In 1995 she won an IADB scholarship to study at the University of Chile's Faculty of Industrial Engineering in its Master of Management and Public Policy program.

In 1999 she completed training in international health at the Pan American Health Organization in Washington, D.C.

== Career ==
La Rosa's foray into public management began in 1991 when she was appointed director general of the National Population Council's National Youth Program for the Presidency of the Council of Ministers (PCM), from which she promoted the development of multisectoral policies for youth.

She was coordinator of the Pathfinder Fund Program from the non-governmental organization PROFAMILIA, from which the first 12 specialized public services for adolescents were created.

In 1996 she founded the Peruvian Society for Adolescence and Youth, and served as its executive director on two occasions.

In 2008, she was appointed advisor to the Minister of Health and then the ministry's director general of international cooperation, serving in this role until August 2011. At the end of 2011, she joined the National Civil Service Authority's Body of Public Managers as its manager of social development.

In 2012, La Rosa was appointed director of international cooperation and negotiation of the Ministry of Foreign Affairs' Agency for International Cooperation. She later headed the Directorate of Policies and Programs, functions that culminated in her being assigned as a Public Manager of the PCM as head of international cooperation. In 2015 she served as the Ministry of Labour's director general of cooperation and international relations.

Later, she worked as a full-time professor at the PUCP Faculty of Social Sciences, a position that includes teaching at its School of Government and Public Policy.

=== National Dean of the College of Nurses of Peru ===
On 1 May 2017, La Rosa was part of the foundation of the #Súmate Movement, through which she won the national election for National Dean of the College of Nurses of Peru. She was sworn in on 29 January 2018. During her tenure, the nursing ombudsman position was created, and a legislative initiative was presented to approve the Law to Create the Program for the Protection of Orphans from Feminicide.

After completing her term at the Minister of Development and Social Inclusion on 12 March 2019, she resumed her position as National Dean of the College of Nurses of Peru. In this role, she led the World Nursing Now Campaign at the national level in 2019.

=== Minister of Development and Social Inclusion of Peru ===
On 2 April 2018, Liliana La Rosa was sworn in as Minister of Development and Social Inclusion of Peru, joining the Villanueva cabinet of Martín Vizcarra's government. Her appointment caused controversy in some sectors, recalling that she had been a member of the Broad Front, a conglomerate of leftist groups that had contributed to the fall of the previous government of Pedro Pablo Kuczynski. La Rosa defended herself by saying that she had resigned from the Broad Front months before, when she was elected National Dean of the College of Nurses.

== Selected publications ==
- Ponce A., Ana; La Rosa Huertas, Liliana (1995). Nuestra sexualidad: mis abuelos, mis padres [Our Sexuality: My Grandparents, My Parents] (in Spanish). Pontifical Catholic University of Peru. OCLC 1097804588.
- La educacion sexual en la escuela (in Spanish). Lima: Universidad Peruana Cayetano Heredia. 1997. OCLC 69874229.
- Reforma sanitaria, promoción de la salud y programas de salud de l@s adolescentes en la Región [Health Reform, Health Promotion and Health Programs for Adolescents in the Region] (PDF) (in Spanish). Pan American Health Organization. March 2001. OCLC 71174327.
- Modelos de atención de salud para adolescentes en el sector público: estudio de diez experiencias en el Perú [Healthcare Models for Adolescents in the Public Sector: Study of Ten Experiences in Peru] (in Spanish). Peruvian Society for Adolescence and Youth. 2002. OCLC 948220877.
