= Ministry of Development and Social Inclusion (Peru) =

Government ministry of Peru

Minister of Development and Social Inclusion of Peru
- Incumbent; Lily Vásquez Dávila since 24 February 2026
- Appointer: President
- Term length: by appointment
- Inaugural holder: Carolina Trivelli
- Formation: 20 October 2011

The Ministry of Development and Social Inclusion (Spanish: Ministerio de Desarrollo e Inclusión Social) is a government ministry of Peru. It is responsible for the implementation of social aid national programmes. It was created in 2011, during the presidency of Ollanta Humala. The inaugural minister was economist Carolina Trivelli.

As of 24 February 2026, the minister is Lily Vásquez.

== History and function ==
President Ollanta Humala had initially pledged to form a Ministry of Development and Social Inclusion. However, on 18 August, the cabinet authorised the creation of the Ministry of Development and Social Inclusion, whose function would be to implement the social programmes of the government to promote "social inclusion." The ministry was created with the purpose of turning the social programmes into productive tools for the benefit of the poor. One of its objectives is to create conditions so that beneficiaries of such social programmes as Juntos, Pension 65 and Cuna Mas, as promoted by Humala's policy of promoting social inclusion during his campaign, can use the subsidies for "financial leverage" to improve their quality of life, according to Prime Minister Salomon Lerner Ghitis.

The ministry would be in charge of some social issues that were formerly managed by either the Ministry of Women's Affairs, the cabinet, or the Ministry of Finance. The Ministry of Production would continue to be in charge of such sectors as those involving fisheries and industries. The Ministry of Women's Affairs, however, would undergo some changes.

The inaugural minister, Kurt Burneo, said that "The idea is to centralise the social programmes. One of the current problems that has led to glaring economic losses is the fact that the social programmes are disperse." He further added that his role would entail the formulation, planning, implementation, evaluation and monitoring of the national and sectoral policy on social development and inclusion.

New social program is "The National Photovoltaic Household Electrification Program", which goal is to secure electrification for poorest people in Peru.

== List of ministers ==
	Name	Took office	Left office	Party
1.	Carolina Trivelli	21 October 2011	22 July 2013	Independent
2.	Mónica Rubio García	24 July 2013	24 February 2014	Independent
3.	Paola Bustamante Suárez	24 February 2014	28 July 2016	Independent
4.	Lucía Cayetana Aljovín Gazzani	28 July 2016	27 July 2017	Independent
5.	Fiorella Giannina Molinelli Aristondo	27 July 2017	9 January 2018	Peruanos Por el Kambio
6.	Jorge Meléndez Celis	9 January 2018	2 April 2018	Peruanos Por el Kambio
7.	Liliana del Carmen La Rosa Huertas	2 April 2018	11 March 2019	independent
8.	Paola Bustamante	11 March 2019	30 September 2019	
9.	Jorge Meléndez Celis	3 October 2019	27 October 2019	Peruanos Por el Kambio
10.	Ariela Luna	29 October 2019	15 July 2020	
11.	Patricia Donayre	15 July 2020	10 November 2020	Popular Force
12.	Federico Tong	12 November 2020	17 November 2020	
13.	Silvana Vargas	18 November 2020	28 July 2021	
14.	Dina Boluarte	29 July 2021	25 November 2022	Free Peru (2021–2022) / Independent (2022)
15.	Cinthya Lindo Espinoza	25 November 2022	7 December 2022	Free Peru
16.	Julio Demartini	10 December 2022	31 January 2025	Independent
17.	Leslie Urteaga	31 January 2025	Incumbent	Independent

== See also ==
- AYNI Lab Social
