= Ariela Luna =

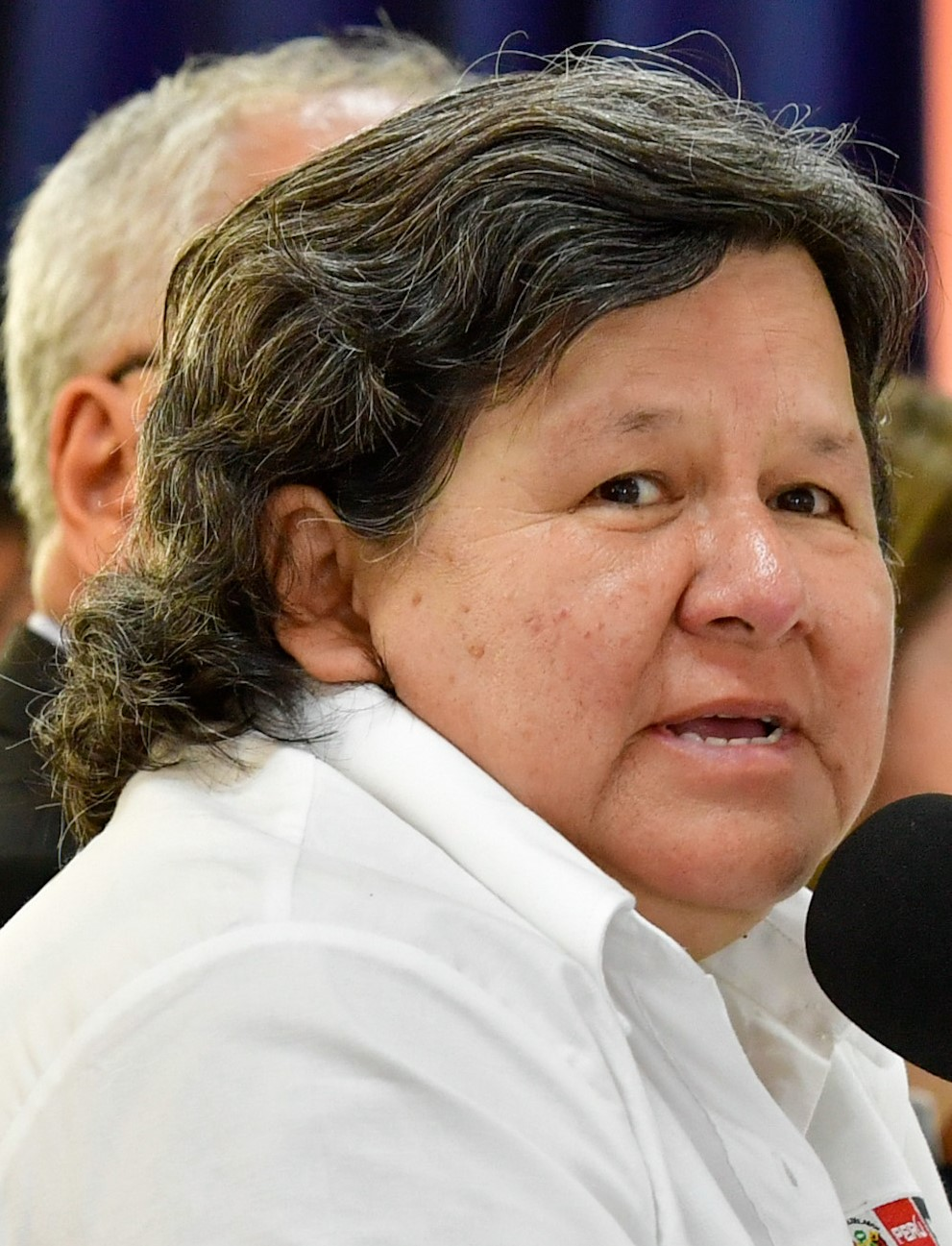

Minister of Development and Social Inclusion of Peru
- In office 29 October 2019 – 15 July 2020
- President: Martín Vizcarra
- Prime Minister: Vicente Zeballos
- Preceded by: Jorge Meléndez Celis
- Succeeded by: Patricia Donayre

Personal details
- Born: Ariela María de los Milagros Luna Florez; 21 October 1958 (age 67)
- Education: National University of San Marcos; Cayetano Heredia University; Pontifical Catholic University of Peru
- Occupation: Physician, anthropologist

Ariela María de los Milagros Luna Florez (born 21 October 1958) is a Peruvian physician and anthropologist. She was her country's Minister of Development and Social Inclusion (MIDIS) from 29 October 2019 to 15 July 2020, during the government of Martín Vizcarra.

== Early life and education ==
Ariela Luna studied medicine at the National University of San Marcos. She holds a master's degree in public health from the Cayetano Heredia University, and a diploma in anthropology from the Pontifical Catholic University of Peru.

== Professional career ==
In 2004, Luna became president of the KALLPA Association for the Promotion of Comprehensive Health and Development, an NGO.

From 2008 to 2009, she served as general director of health promotion at Peru's Ministry of Health. From August 2011 to January 2012, she was head of the ministry's advisory cabinet.

In April 2014, she was appointed by President Ollanta Humala as Vice Minister of Policies and Social Evaluation of the Ministry of Development and Social Inclusion, under the management of minister Paola Bustamante. She remained in office until September 2016, and served again in the same post from March to October 2019. Along with Bustamante, she promoted the programs Childhood First and Permanent Exit From Poverty.

On 29 October 2019, she was sworn in before President Martín Vizcarra as Peru's Minister of Development and Social Inclusion, after the resignation of Jorge Meléndez Celis.

== Selected publications ==
- La salud para la escuela: Manuel para coordinadores de salud (1998)
- Salud materna indígena: Caja de herramientas para la incorporación del componente intercultural en proyectos de reducción de muerte materna (2010), ISBN 978-1-59782-110-0
- Inclusión social: instrumentos de gestión y resultados de política (2015)
