= Juliaca massacre =

2023 mass killing by the Peruvian National Police

- Part of the 2022–2023 Peruvian protests
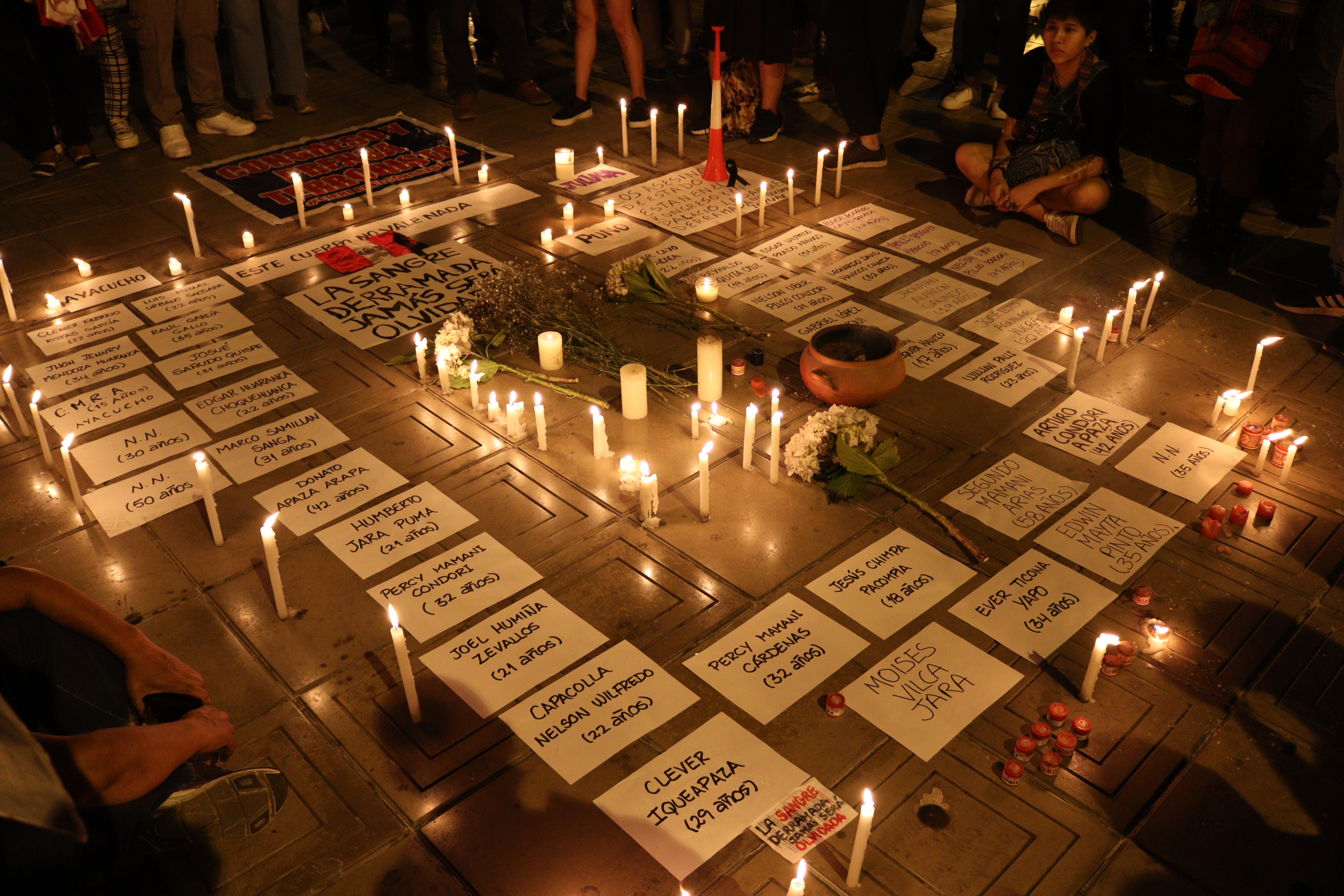
- Memorial to those killed in Juliaca

- Location: Juliaca, Department of Puno, Peru
- Date: 9 January 2023; 3 years ago
- Target: Aymara and Quechua protesters
- Attack type: Massacre, mass shooting, police brutality
- Weapons: AKM rifles, shotguns and handguns
- Deaths: 18
- Injuries: 100+
- Perpetrator: Peruvian National Police

The Juliaca massacre occurred on 9 January 2023, in the city of Juliaca, located in Peru’s Puno Department, amid widespread protests against President Dina Boluarte's government. The event marked one of the deadliest confrontations during the 2022–2023 Peruvian political protests, which erupted following the ousting and imprisonment of former president Pedro Castillo. Peruvian National Police opened fire on demonstrators, who were primarily local civilians of Quechua and Aymara heritage, resulting in the deaths of at least 18 civilians, including a medical worker, and injuries to over 100 individuals. Most fatalities were caused by gunshot wounds, with reports indicating the use of military-grade weapons by police, sparking widespread condemnation.

The massacre unfolded as part of a broader wave of civil unrest fueled by longstanding grievances in Peru’s marginalized rural regions, where protesters demanded early elections and Castillo’s release. The violence in Juliaca drew international criticism, including from human rights organizations and the Inter-American Commission on Human Rights, which categorized the incident as a "massacre." In the aftermath, allegations surfaced that police infiltrators and excessive use of force contributed to the deaths and injuries, leading to calls for accountability within Peru and abroad.

== Background ==
=== Attempted dissolution of Congress ===
During the presidencies of Ollanta Humala, Pedro Pablo Kuczynski and Martín Vizcarra, the right-wing Congress led by Keiko Fujimori obstructed many of the actions performed by the presidents. In the 2021 Peruvian general election, Pedro Castillo was elected president of Peru, receiving much of his support from rural areas that believed that the elites in Lima led through corruption. According to historian José Ragas of the Pontifical Catholic University of Chile, although Castillo was accused of being linked to communist terrorism, "in places where terrorism caused the most bloodshed, Castillo won by a lot." In contrast, Fujimori, who was Castillo's contender during the presidential election, received support from Lima's elite, with evangelical Christians, businesses, media organizations, and the armed forces supporting her.

During Castillo's presidency, Congress was dominated by right-wing parties opposed to him, with legislators attempting to impeach multiple times using political avenues. Due to broadly interpreted impeachment wording in the Constitution of Peru (1993), Congress can impeach the president on the vague grounds of "moral incapacity", effectively making the legislature more powerful than the executive branch. On 7 December 2022, Congress was expected to file a motion of censure against Castillo, accusing him of "permanent moral incapacity". Before the legislative body could gather to file its motion, Castillo announced the dissolution of Congress and enacted an immediate curfew. Moments after Castillo's speech, multiple ministers resigned from his government, including Prime Minister Betssy Chávez. The Constitutional Court released a statement: "No one owes obedience to a usurping government and Mr. Pedro Castillo has made an ineffective coup d'état. The Armed Forces are empowered to restore the constitutional order." The Armed Forces also issued a statement rejecting Castillo's actions and calling for the maintenance of stability in Peru. Rejecting Castillo's actions to dissolve the legislative body, Congress gathered and voted to remove Castillo from office due to "moral incapacity" with 101 votes in favor, 6 against and 10 abstentions. It was announced that First Vice President Dina Boluarte, who rejected Castillo's actions, would take her oath of office for the presidency at 3:00 pm PET. Castillo's vice president Dina Boluarte entered the Legislative Palace shortly after 3:00 pm PET and appeared before Congress, where she was later sworn in as president of Peru.

=== Protests ===
For Castillo's supporters, it was the Congress that carried out a coup against the president. In addition, they considered Boluarte a "traitor", "dictator" and "usurper" after her subsequent assumption as the new president of the republic, based on the promise of the then vice president: "If the president is vacated I will go with the president". In this way, supporters of the former president encouraged the prompt release of Castillo and an advance of elections. The Boluarte government first responded with police attempting to quell the protests, though later resulted with declaring a national state of emergency and using the military to repress demonstrations.

=== Impunity of authorities ===
The Peruvian government's use of force has been criticized by a number of human rights groups who argue police and troops often use violence with impunity. Human Rights Watch stated at the time that "[e]xcessive use of force by state agents is a persistent problem in Peru. Rules for use of force by security forces do not comply with international standards", with the human rights group reporting that Congress has removed proportionality guidelines regarding use of force, making it easier for authorities to use excessive force with impunity.

On 15 December 2022, demonstrators in Ayacucho approached the Coronel FAP Alfredo Mendívil Duarte Airport, with the Peruvian Armed Forces closing the airport in response, with clashes occurring shortly after. Human rights groups reported that members of the Peruvian Army were seen shooting at civilians protesting in an event described as the Ayacucho massacre, which left 10 civilians dead and 61 injured. Casualties were sent for treatment at the Huamanga Network and in the Ayacucho Regional Hospital, with 90% of injuries resulting from gunshot wounds according to the Ayacucho regional health system. The event was not prominently covered by the media in Peru. Academics and human rights organizations condemned the excessive use of force by Peruvian authorities, while the Minister of Culture and Minister of Education resigned from the newly formed government of Dina Boluarte in response.

=== Puno general strike ===
In Puno, multiple roads in the region were barricaded by protesters seeking to achieve a general strike in Peru after the end of the holiday season, with Juliaca being the epicenter of the protests beginning on 4 January. Two days prior to the massacre, protesters attempted to enter Inca Manco Cápac International Airport on 7 January, though they were dispersed by police using tear gas. During the protest, one tank used by police caught fire. Police also used excessive force on the citizens of Juliaca; officers were seen trying to burn a motor-taxi, launching tear gas from helicopters at individuals, breaking windows of houses and attacking a child. Authorities also shot a photojournalist of EFE in the leg, allegedly threatening the reporter saying "I'll blow off your head".

By 8 January, Juliaca was totally immobilized, with all routes to the city being controlled by protesters. Following the demonstrations of the previous day, Aymara and Quechua groups in surrounding regions announced that they would march to Juliaca to protest against oppression by authorities. In response to the call for larger protests and to avoid protester roadblocks, the Peruvian Air Force transported ammunition, tear gas and other equipment to respond to protests in the area, with a Lockheed C-130 Hercules arriving at Inca Manco Cápac International Airport at 11:00 am.

== Events ==
Demonstrators from Ananea, Azángaro, Ayaviri, Carabaya, Moho, Huancané and Putina marched to Juliaca to participate in protests. Protesters approached Inca Manco Cápac International Airport around noon and demonstrated nearby. Plainclothes "terna" police were then reported to have infiltrated the protests, with reports of them inciting individuals present.

At around 2:00 pm PET, a man who was returning home from selling cobblestones was shot by police with a shotgun, suffering over 70 gunshot wounds to his heart and lungs, becoming the first victim. According to The New York Times, the shooting was a violation of protocols, writing that per regulations, "when [police are] faced with protesters throwing blunt objects like rocks, officers should use rubber bullets, aiming at the lower extremities". President Boluarte, who was meeting at the National Agreement Capacity event in an attempt to diffuse protests, "showed her coldest side" according to El País when she announced the death of the man, stating "I have just been informed that a civilian has just died in Puno. Brothers of Puno and where they are still rising in protests about what. It is not clear what you are asking for. I have already explained to you that the four political points are not in my hands, the only thing was the advance of the elections and we have already proposed it."

Protests then escalated, with individuals beginning to enter the airport while throwing rocks and shooting fireworks at 5:20 pm PET, with authorities responding to the demonstration with tear gas being fired at protesters on the ground and from a helicopter overhead. Police then begin to respond with deadly force. Medical staff responding to those injured reported that police fired at protesters at point blank range, with the head of an intensive care unit reporting the possible use of explosives against citizens due to severe displacement of internal organs. In total, 18 civilians were killed and over 100 others were injured. Most of those killed were from Azángaro, with one doctor tending the wounded killed by authorities firing into the crowds. A teenage girl was also shot by police while she was walking to purchase food. A 15-year-old boy died from a gunshot wound to the head on 12 January days after the event. When discussing the causes of death for the individuals, the head of medicine in Juliaca stated "We know that everyone has died from a firearm projectile".

== Aftermath ==
Journalists covering the massacre were sought to be identified by police intelligence units. After the killing of protesters by the police, looting in Juliaca began that night, with some authorities seen participating in the thefts. Protesters reported that those looting seemed to be local infiltrators and when police were contacted about looting in the city, police did not respond; authorities were instead seen abandoning the protection of stores. The head of the Puno Traffic Safety Police was found with stolen televisions and other goods from a looted store. A total of 40 people were arrested for looting on 10 January. Two officers were treated for injuries at a local hospital, with the pair being noted in plainclothes and reportedly being "terna" infiltrators. One officer was found dead in a burned patrol car the following morning, with the circumstances surrounding his death being unknown.

=== Investigations ===
==== Use of firearms ====
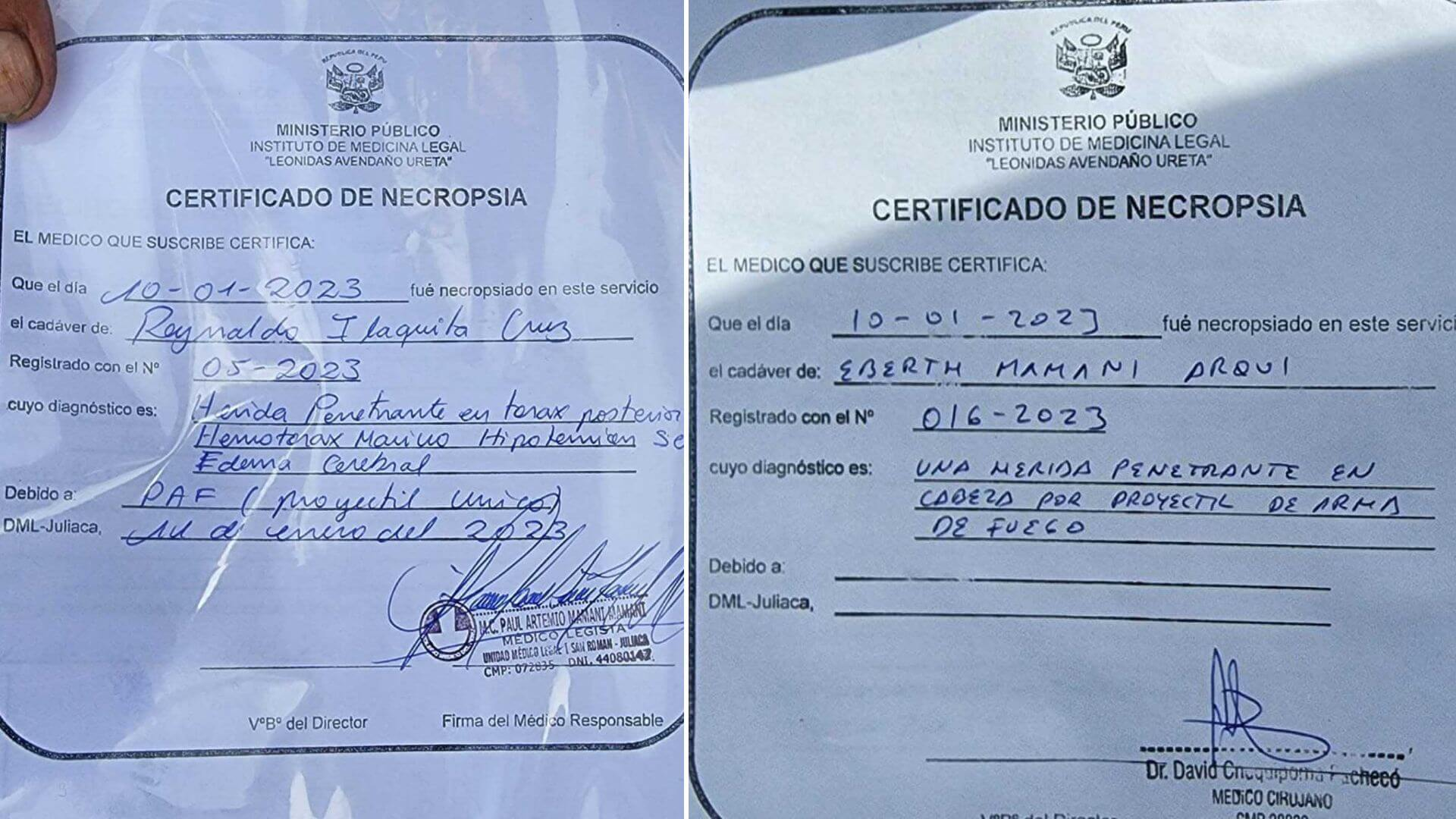
Autopsy documents showing cause of deaths by firearm projectiles

Investigations of bullet fragments present in 9 individuals killed in the protests showed that 6 of the dead had 7.62×39mm rounds in their bodies, 2 had metal pellets from shotguns present and 1 individual had a handgun bullet present; the remaining dead had entry and exit wounds, presumably due to being shot at close range. Videos and photographic evidence, according to La República, showed that the PNP used long rifles to fire at demonstrators and individuals nearby. According to Dany Humpire Molina, former manager of Expertise at the Public Prosecutor's Office and a doctor in forensic science, "The projectiles seem to have been fired by AKM rifles, which is weapons used by the National Police, ... If the bullets were found inside the body, they are described as penetrating. When the shots are of a penetrating type, as is the case, they are long-distance. And if the necropsy protocol determines that they went from behind, it means that, at the time of the shooting, the demonstrators were running, fleeing". The forensic doctor also noted that the bullets were "coated", showing that they were not for civilian use.

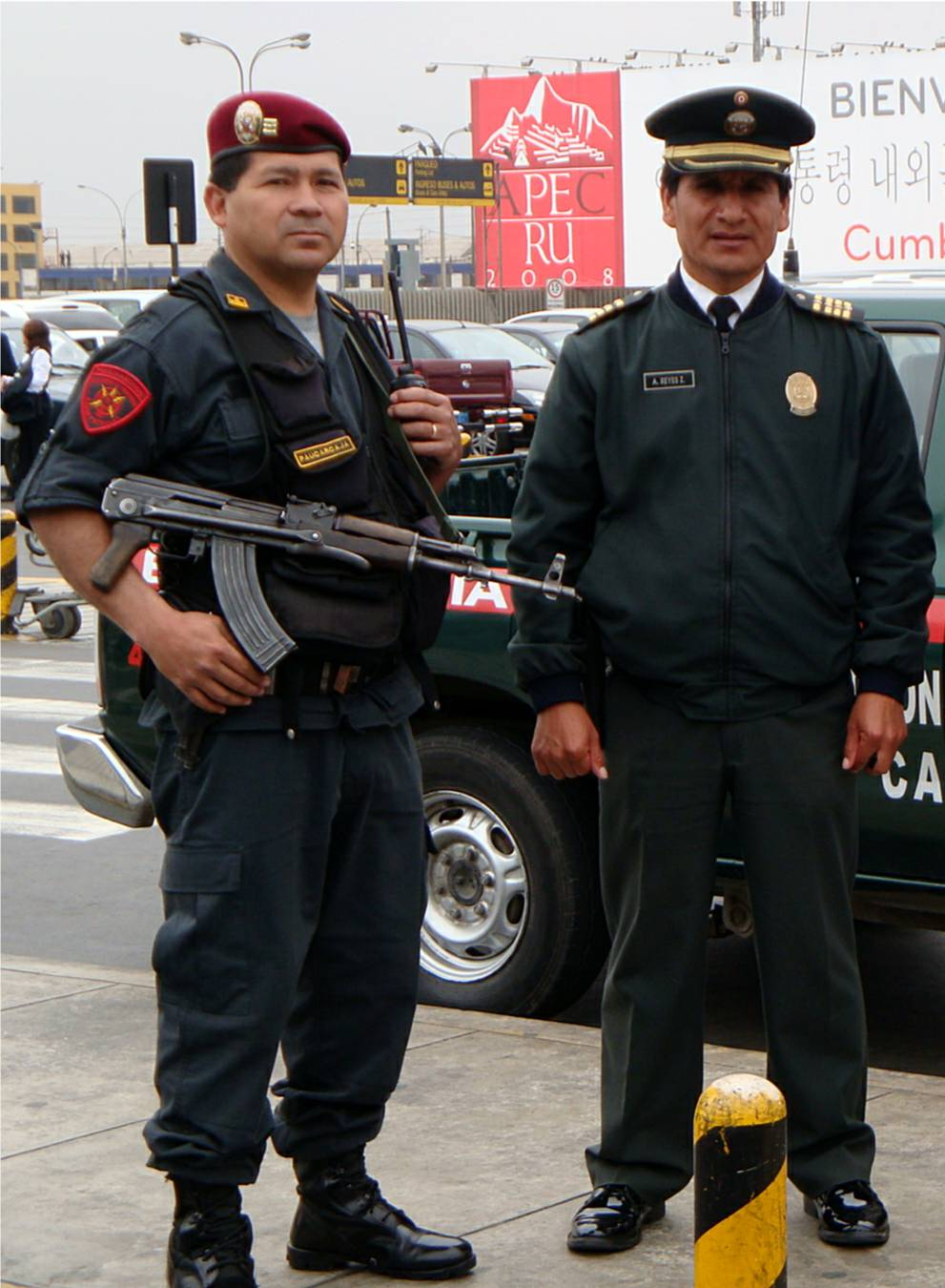
PNP officer with an AKM rifle

President Boluarte, however, would counter such findings, accused Bolivia of inciting violence and said that protesters were shot by other protesters and not authorities, stating the ammunition found in victims was used "neither by the National Police nor by the Armed Forces". The New York Times wrote that statements by President Boluarte had no supporting evidence. Edgar Stuardo Ralón Orellana of the Inter-American Commission on Human Rights, stated "we do not find in people something that said that they are responding to some kind of another organization, but an authentic manifestation of a discontent with the abandonment that that region (Puno) has historically had". The former head of the National Directorate of Intelligence (DINI), General Wilson Barrantes Mendoza, also criticized the Boluarte government's response, stating that accusations of foreign involvement were "a distraction to confuse the population, noting that it has an external component. Everything we are experiencing is internal" and that the accusation of "a 'terrorist insurgency' is stupid". United Nations Special Rapporteur Clément Nyaletsossi Voule would also say that there were no terrorist groups involved in the protests, stating "I did not find any evidence or evidence that protesters were terrorists or that they were controlled by someone else or that they have ties to terrorism. ... They are not terrorists, they are Peruvians".

==== Death of officer ====
On the morning of 11 January, an officer reported that he and his partner José Luis Soncco Quispe were detained by unknown individuals; the officer reported that about 350 people had captured them and that his partner had disappeared. Prime Minister of Peru, Alberto Otárola, initially reported that Soncco was burned alive in his patrol car, though a later autopsy showed that the officer was killed due to brain trauma. During the investigation into the Soncco's death, authorities provided contradictory information regarding the circumstances surrounding the death. Officer Ronald Villasante Toque, Soncco's partner, reported that their lieutenant Anthony Herrera Choquehuanca order the two to go to Tambopata, a quiet area. Herrera denied this, saying that he did not communicate with the officers until after the incident. Contradictions also occurred regarding the condition of Soncco after his patrol car was reportedly attacked with stones; Villasante said he was assured by passerby who assisted him that Soncco was safe. In March 2023, a former officer of the Peruvian National Police and a civilian were arrested for allegedly attacking Soncco and burning the patrol vehicle.

==== Footage deleted ====
In June 2023, IDL-Reporteros reported that the company operating the Coronel FAP Alfredo Mendívil Duarte Airport, Aeropuertos Andinos del Perú, said that it deleted video footage of the incident and was not asked by government investigators to provide any images.

== Responses ==
=== Government ===
Regional government of Puno enacted a curfew for three days following the event, with the Governor of Puno, Richard Huancco, saying that President Boluarte was responsible for the deaths and that she should resign. The Boluarte government also issued a three-day curfew on 11 January between 8:00 pm and 4:00 am. Former Minister of Defense and current Prime Minister of Peru Alberto Otárola responded to the deaths stating those killed "express a direct responsibility of those who want to carry out a coup d'état in the country" and blamed imprisoned former president Pedro Castillo for the deaths. Interior Minister Víctor Rojas defended the response of the police, stating "They instigated and it couldn't be controlled ... Are they looking for a target? There it is".

On 19 March 2023, PNP generals who were responsible for the response to protests were reassigned to different positions.

=== International ===
The Inter-American Commission on Human Rights condemned the massacre, stating "The IACHR condemns the death of at least 17 people in the vicinity of the airport in Juliaca, on January 9, where dozens of injured people were also registered. The IACHR urges the State to take immediate measures to prevent and punish the excessive use of force in social protests".

== See also ==
- Senkata massacre
- Human rights in Peru
- List of massacres in Peru
