= Patricia Donayre =

Peruvian lawyer and politician

Minister of Development and Social Inclusion of Peru
- In office 15 July 2020 – 10 November 2020
- President: Martín Vizcarra
- Prime Minister: Pedro Cateriano; Walter Martos
- Preceded by: Ariela Luna
- Succeeded by: Federico Tong

Member of Congress
- In office 27 July 2016 – 30 September 2019
- Constituency: Loreto
- In office 27 July 2000 – 26 July 2001
- Constituency: single district

Personal details
- Born: Patricia Elizabeth Donayre Pasquel; 10 June 1971 (age 54) Iquitos, Loreto, Peru
- Education: Women's University of the Sacred Heart; Complutense University of Madrid
- Occupation: Lawyer, politician

Patricia Elizabeth Donayre Pasquel (born 10 June 1971) is a Peruvian lawyer and politician. She was her country's Minister of Development and Social Inclusion (MIDIS) from 15 July to 10 November 2020, during the government of Martín Vizcarra.

== Early life and education ==
Donayre was born in Iquitos, Loreto on 10 June 1971, the daughter of congressman Jorge Donayre Lozano and Luz Pasquel.

She completed her higher studies at the Women's University of the Sacred Heart, receiving her law degree (1993). She obtained a doctorate, in problems of parliamentarism, at the Complutense University of Madrid, and a diploma in constitutional law and political science at the Centre for Political and Constitutional Studies.

She is also a Master in Public Management for Ibero-American Executives at ESAN - UNED.

== Political career ==
=== Congresswoman (2000-2001) ===
In the 2000 general elections, Donayre was elected Congresswoman of the Republic by the Independent Moralizing Front, with 15,106 votes, for the parliamentary period 2000–2005. During her work in the legislature, she came to exercise, for a few days, the 2nd Vice Presidency of the board of directors chaired by Francisco Tudela in 2000. She was also part of the opposition to the dictatorial government of Alberto Fujimori. On 14 September of the same year, Donayre participated in the press conference led by Fernando Olivera where the Vladivideos were to be made public, where the then opposition congressman, Alberto Kouri, was seen receiving money from ex-adviser Vladimiro Montesinos in exchange. to join the ranks of Peru 2000.

In November of the same year, after the removal of Fujimori by Congress and the assumption of Valentín Paniagua to the interim presidency, her parliamentary position was reduced until 2001 when new elections were called. In those elections, Donayre tried to retain her seat by the same party, but she was not elected.

=== Candidate for the Regional President of Loreto in 2002 ===
In the 2002 regional elections, Donayre ran for Regional President of Loreto for Possible Peru, but was unsuccessful. For the 2006 general elections, she tried again to run for Congress for Centre Front where she was unsuccessful and in the same way in the 2011 general elections where she was a candidate for Alliance for the Great Change but she was not elected either.

=== Congresswoman (2016-2019) ===
In the 2016 general elections, Donayre was invited by Popular Force to run for Congress and was elected, obtaining 26,543 votes for the 2016-2021 parliamentary period.
