= Pedro Angulo Arana =

Peruvian lawyer and politician

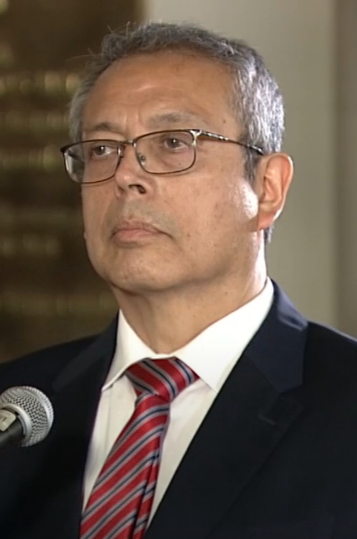
- Angulo in 2022

Prime Minister of Peru
- In office 10 December 2022 – 21 December 2022
- President: Dina Boluarte
- Preceded by: Betssy Chávez
- Succeeded by: Alberto Otárola

Dean of the Lima Bar Association
- In office 11 January 2016 – 13 January 2018
- Preceded by: Mario Amoretti
- Succeeded by: María Elena Portocarrero

Personal details
- Born: Pedro Miguel Angulo Arana; 5 February 1960 (age 66) Lima, Peru
- Party: Independent (until 2020; since 2021)
- Other political affiliations: Contigo (2020–2021)
- Education: National University of San Marcos (BA, LLB, PhD); Federico Villarreal National University (BA)
- Profession: Lawyer

Pedro Miguel Angulo Arana (born 5 February 1960) is a Peruvian lawyer who served as prime minister of Peru under the presidency of Dina Boluarte, from 10 December 2022 to 21 December 2022.

== Education ==
Angulo Arana obtained his bachelor's degree in communication sciences from the Federico Villarreal National University, later obtaining a master's degree and a doctorate in law from the National University of San Marcos.

== Political career ==
Prior to his appointment as prime minister of Peru, Angulo served as a senior prosecutor for the Public Prosecutor's Office and as dean of the Lima Bar Association for one term. In November 2020, he was selected as the presidential nominee for the right-wing Contigo party for the 2021 Peruvian general election, but was unable to register on time for the election.

On 10 December 2022, Angulo was sworn in as Prime Minister of Peru by president Dina Boluarte. He was succeeded by Alberto Otárola on 21 December.

== Controversy ==
In 2006, the International Freedom of Expression Exchange (IFEX) criticized Angulo's actions serving as state prosecutor when he charged a journalist with withholding evidence, with IFEX stating that the journalist's actions were not a crime under Peruvian law and that he was attempting to broadcast alleged recordings of National Intelligence Council chief César Almeyda blackmailing Óscar Villanueva, a general.

According to Voice of America, Angulo faced 13 criminal investigations as of his appointment in December 2022, including abuse of authority, abuse of public administration, abuse of public faith, blackmail, extortion and others. La República wrote that Prime Minister Angulo faces allegations of sexual harassment of women assistants and supporting the actions of César Hinostroza, who illegally asked for favors from magistrate María Apaza and fled from Peru.

Political offices
Preceded by Betssy Chávez	Prime Minister of Peru; 2022	Succeeded by Alberto Otárola
