= AYNI Social Lab =

- AYNI Lab Social
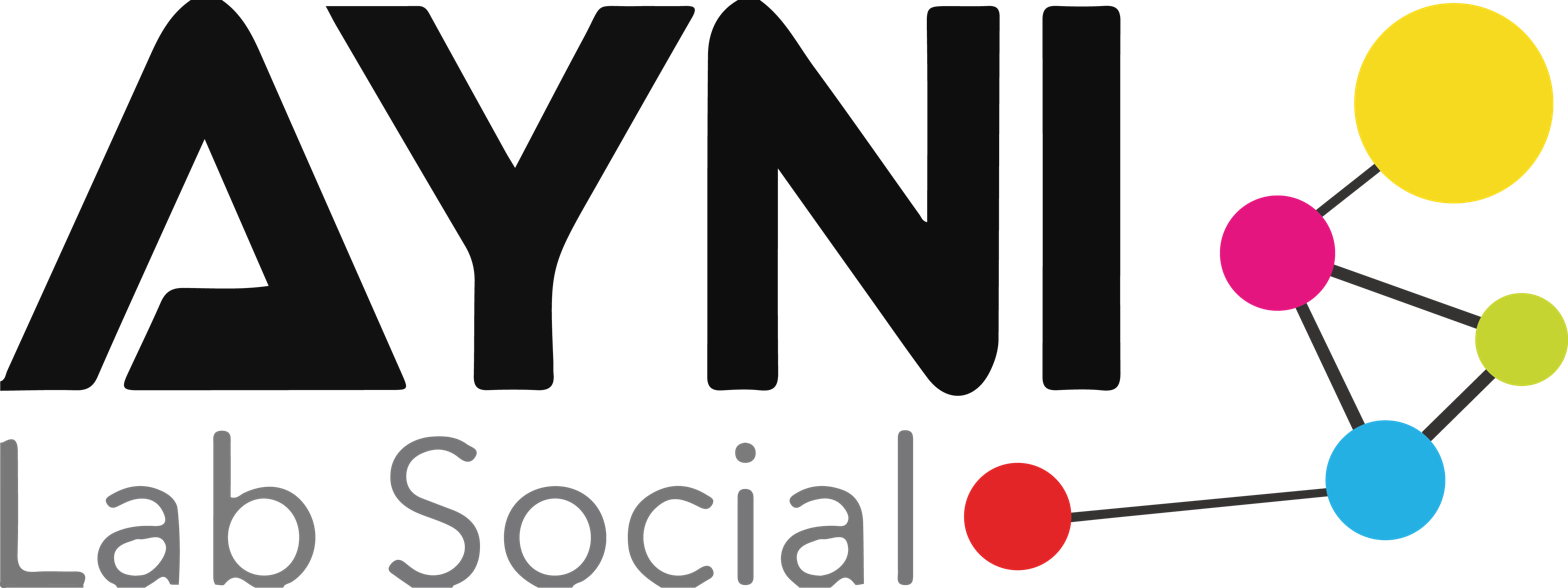
- Formation: 2016; 10 years ago
- Type: Social Innovation Lab and Think tank
- Location: Lima, Peru
- President: Vice Minister María Eugenia Mujica
- Website: evidencia.midis.gob.pe/innovacion-social

AYNI Social Lab is the social innovation laboratory of the Ministry of Development and Social Inclusion of Peru. It was created in October 2016 to promote the generation of cost-effective innovations for social policy, through the identification and implementation of innovative solutions aimed at improving the quality of life of the population in conditions of poverty or vulnerability. It is the first laboratory of cost-effective innovation officially created—by Ministerial Resolution—in Peru. President of Peru, Pedro Pablo Kuczynski, mentioned the creation of the AYNI Lab Social in his conference on the advances and achievements of the government within the 100 days of his management.

In addition to the specialists and the technical team of the AYNI Lab Social, the "Working Group" is the one which has the responsibility of guiding all its activities. This group is made up of: the Deputy Minister of Social Policy and Evaluation (President of the team), the Deputy Minister of Social Benefits, the Director General of Quality Management of Social Programs, the Director General of Articulation or Coordination of Social Benefits, the Director General of Monitoring and Evaluation, the Director of Evaluation, and the Head of the Planning and Investment Office.

The AYNI Lab Social seeks to facilitate the development of social innovations that are original, transferable and reproducible, capable of being transformed into policies, cost-effective, and scalable. In this context, the development of both institutional and technological innovations are being addressed. A good deal of institutional innovations make use of insights from behavioral economics and psychology to achieve cost-effective mechanisms and solutions; moreover, all these seek to be evaluated using experimental methodologies and impact evaluation. As for the technological innovations, these have been addressed on the basis of the open calls "Competitions of Social Innovations", promoted jointly with the Ministry of Development and Social Inclusion of Peru, the Ministry of Production of Peru and Innóvate Perú.

== See also ==
- Think tank
- Social innovation
- Behavioral economics
- Impact evaluation
