= Huacho District =

Huacho Wachu
- District
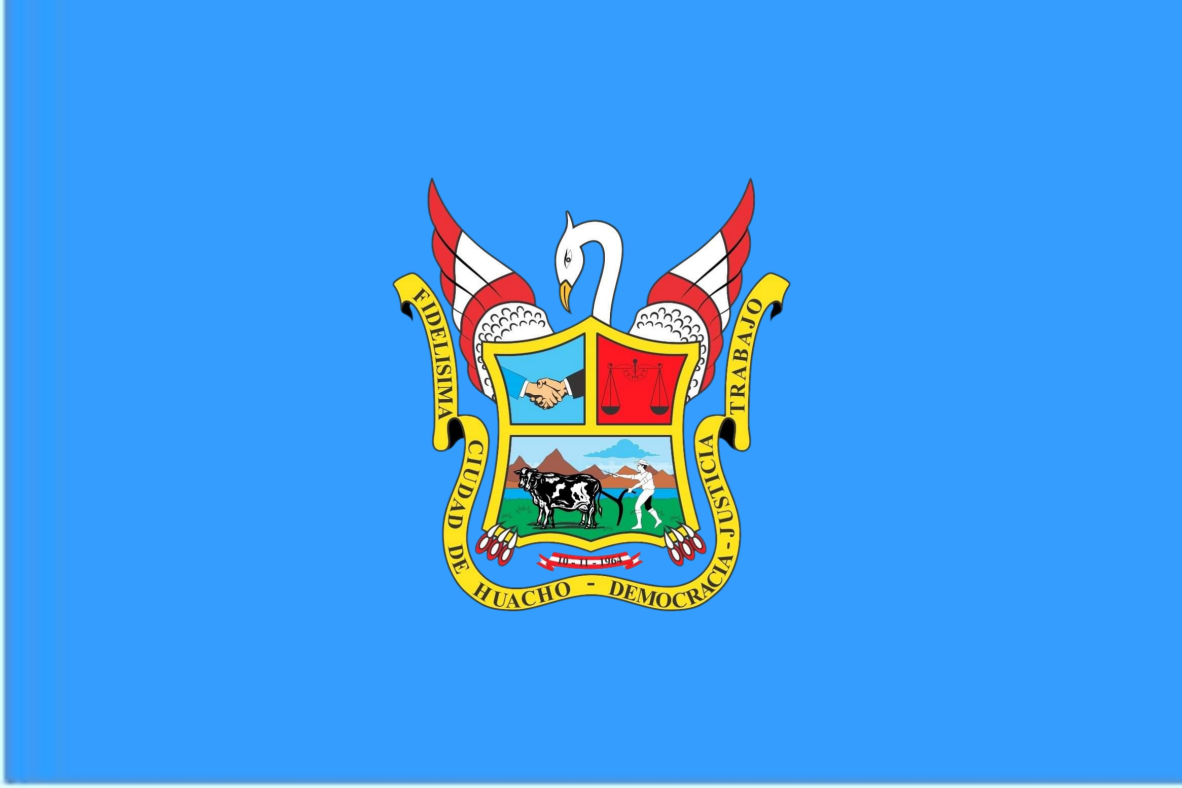
- Huacho flag
- Interactive map of Huacho
- Coordinates: 11°6′24″S 77°36′18″W
- Country: Peru
- Region: Lima
- Province: Huaura
- Capital: Huacho

Government
  - Mayor: Crispulo Eddie Jara Salazar (2019–2022)

Area
  - Total: 717.38 km^{2} (276.98 sq mi)
- Elevation: 30 m (98 ft)

Population (2017)
  - Total: 63,142
  - Density: 88.018/km^{2} (227.96/sq mi)
- Time zone: UTC-5 (PET)
- UBIGEO: 150801

Huacho District is one of twelve districts of the province Huaura in Peru.
