= Eduardo Arana Ysa =

Prime Minister of Peru (born 1965)

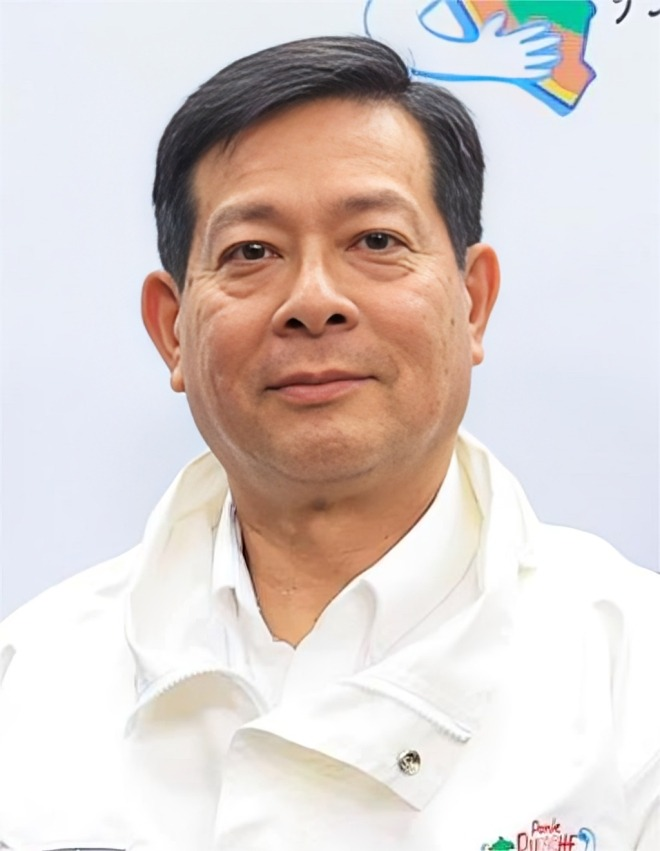
- Arana in 2025

Prime Minister of Peru
- In office 14 May 2025 – 12 October 2025
- President: Dina Boluarte; José Jerí
- Preceded by: Gustavo Adrianzén
- Succeeded by: Ernesto Álvarez Miranda

Minister of Justice and Human Rights
- In office 6 September 2023 – 13 May 2025
- President: Dina Boluarte
- Prime Minister: Alberto Otárola; Gustavo Adrianzén
- Preceded by: Daniel Maurate
- Succeeded by: Juan Alcántara Medrano

Personal details
- Born: Eduardo Melchor Arana Ysa; 18 October 1965 (age 60) Lima, Peru
- Party: Independent
- Other political affiliations: Alliance for Progress (2018)
- Education: Inca Garcilaso de la Vega University (LL.M.)
- Profession: Politician, lawyer

Eduardo Melchor Arana Ysa (born 18 October 1965) is a Peruvian politician and lawyer who served as the prime minister of Peru from May to October 2025. Previously, he served as the Minister of Justice and Human Rights from September 2023 to May 2025.

== Education and legal career ==
Arana was born on 18 October 1965. Arana studied at the Don Bosco Salesian School in Callao, graduating in 1982, when he lived in the Bellavista District. He holds degrees in Law and Political Science from the Inca Garcilaso de la Vega University. He has been a professor at the Federico Villarreal National University since 2000.

Arana served as head of Javier Villa Stein's advisory staff when he was president of the Judiciary from 2009 to 2011. He was also appointed as an arbitrator by the Supervisory Body for State Contracts (OSCE) and secretary of the National Council of the Judiciary.

== Political career ==
Arana entered politics when he ran as a councilor for the San Isidro district for Alliance for Progress, in the 2018 municipal elections. However, he was not elected. He then served as an advisor on the Justice and Education committees during the administrations of Congresswoman and former Attorney General Gladys Echaíz.

=== Minister of Justice (2023–2025) ===
On 6 September 2023, Arana was appointed as the new Minister of Justice and Human Rights by President Dina Boluarte, replacingal Daniel Maurate, who was promoted to another ministerial portfolio. On 13 April 2025, he announced his resignation, but was officially terminated after he was appointed as prime minister by Dina Boluarte following the resignation of Gustavo Adrianzén.

=== Prime Minister (May–October 2025) ===
On 14 May 2025, Eduardo Arana Ysa was appointed as prime minister of Peru by President Dina Boluarte following the resignation of Gustavo Adrianzén.

After President Boluarte was impeached and removed from office in October 2025, Arana temporarily remained in office under the new administration of President José Jerí. On 12 October 2025, Arana left office and was succeeded two days later by Ernesto Álvarez Miranda.

Political offices
Preceded by Daniel Maurate	Minister of Justice and Human Rights; 2023–2025	Succeeded by Juan Alcántara Medrano
Preceded by Gustavo Adrianzén	Prime Minister of Peru; 2025	Succeeded by Ernesto Álvarez Miranda
