= Gustavo Adrianzén =

Peruvian lawyer, politician and diplomat

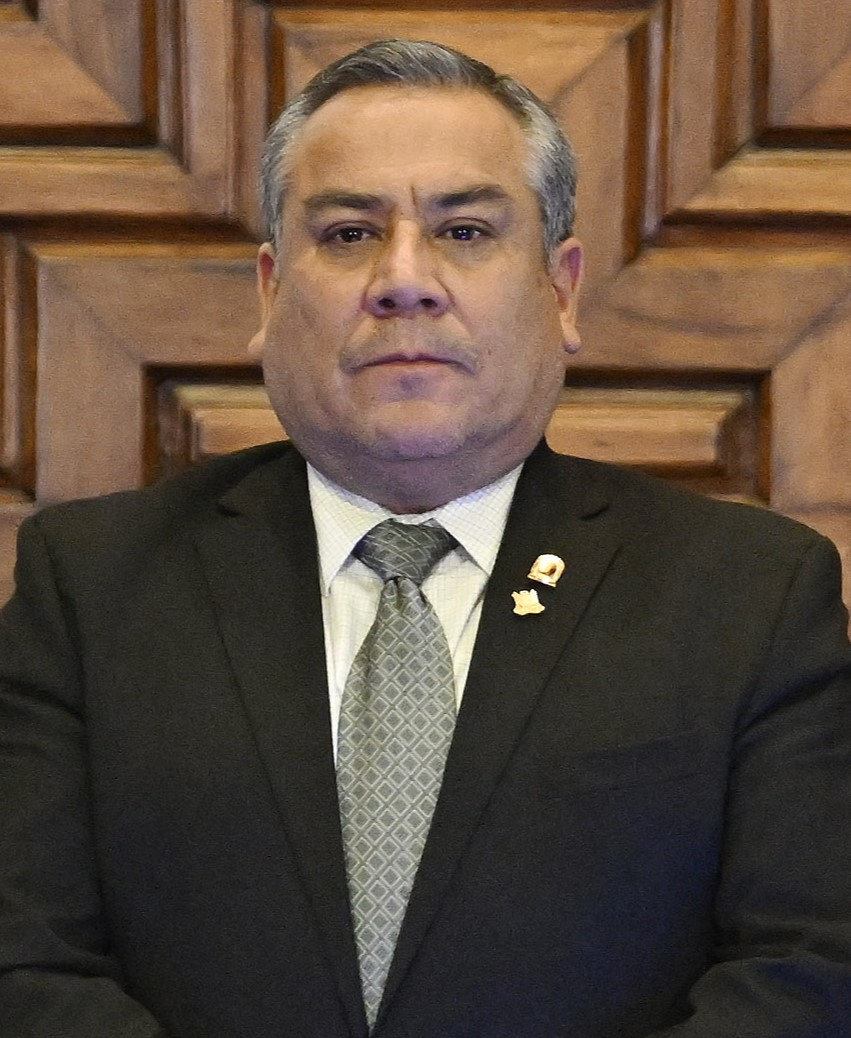
- Adrianzén in 2024

Prime Minister of Peru
- In office 6 March 2024 – 13 May 2025
- President: Dina Boluarte
- Preceded by: Alberto Otárola
- Succeeded by: Eduardo Arana Ysa

26th Permanent Representative of Peru to the Organization of American States
- In office 23 February 2023 – 5 March 2024
- President: Dina Boluarte
- Preceded by: Harold Forsyth (2022)
- Succeeded by: José Luis Sardón de Taboada

Minister of Justice and Human Rights of Peru
- In office 2 April 2015 – 20 October 2015
- President: Ollanta Humala
- Preceded by: Fredy Otárola
- Succeeded by: Aldo Vásquez

Personal details
- Born: 25 October 1966 (age 59)
- Party: Independent
- Education: University of Lima
- Profession: Lawyer

Gustavo Lino Adrianzén Olaya (born 25 October 1966) is a Peruvian lawyer, politician and diplomat who served as the prime minister of Peru between March 2024 and May 2025. Previously, he served as the 26th Permanent Representative of Peru to the Organization of American States from 2023 to 2024, as well as the Minister of Justice and Human Rights under former President Ollanta Humala from April to October 2015.

== Education ==
Having graduated in law from the University of Lima, Adrianzén pursued further studies at the University of Alcalá de Henares in Madrid. His academic journey included a focus on Human Rights in various international locations such as Geneva, Strasbourg, San José, and Florence. Additionally, he obtained a master's degree in Public Administration and Management from Madrid's INAP, along with a Diploma in Public Administration from the Complutense University, both located in the Spanish capital.

== Political career ==
Adrianzén began his political career in 2015 when he was appointed Deputy Minister of Justice and Human Rights. Only two weeks later, on 2 April, he was appointed Minister of Justice and Human Rights, replacing Fredy Otárola. In October, then Money Laundering Prosecutor Julia Príncipe claimed that Adrianzén tried to “gag” her by asking for explanations for her statements to the press regarding the investigations involving First Lady Nadine Heredia. Adrianzén was summoned to Congress to account for these allegations but resigned on 20 October to avoid impeachment. Príncipe was also relieved of her position.

He was appointed by president Dina Boluarte to the post of permanent representative of Peru to Organization of American States (OAS) on 23 February 2023. As ambassador, he expressed the "unwavering and unwavering commitment of the government and people of Peru to the values" of the OAS. He resigned in March 2024 following his appointment as prime minister by President Boluarte.

On 6 March 2024, he was sworn in as Prime Minister of Peru, following the resignation of predecessor Alberto Otárola for his controversial involvement in the hiring of Yaziré Pinedo whom he referred to as "my love" at the Defense Ministry. He resigned on 13 May 2025 shortly before a scheduled no-confidence vote against him in Congress.

Political offices
Preceded by Alberto Otárola	Prime Minister of Peru; 2024–2025	Succeeded by Eduardo Arana Ysa
