= Lucía Dammert =

Peruvian sociologist

Lucía Dammert Guardia (born 19 January 1972 in Lima, Peru) is a Peruvian and Chilean political scientist and politician. From March 2022 to September 2022 she was chief of advisors in the government of Gabriel Boric. During the second government of Michelle Bachelet (2014–2018) she worked as chief of advisors for minister Mahmud Aleuy.

== Personal life ==
Born in Lima, Peru, Lucía is the daughter of Peruvian politician Manuel Dammert and the great-great-granddaughter of philanthropist Juana Alarco de Dammert.

She naturalized Chilean in 2013.
