= Dina Boluarte =

President of Peru from 2022 to 2025

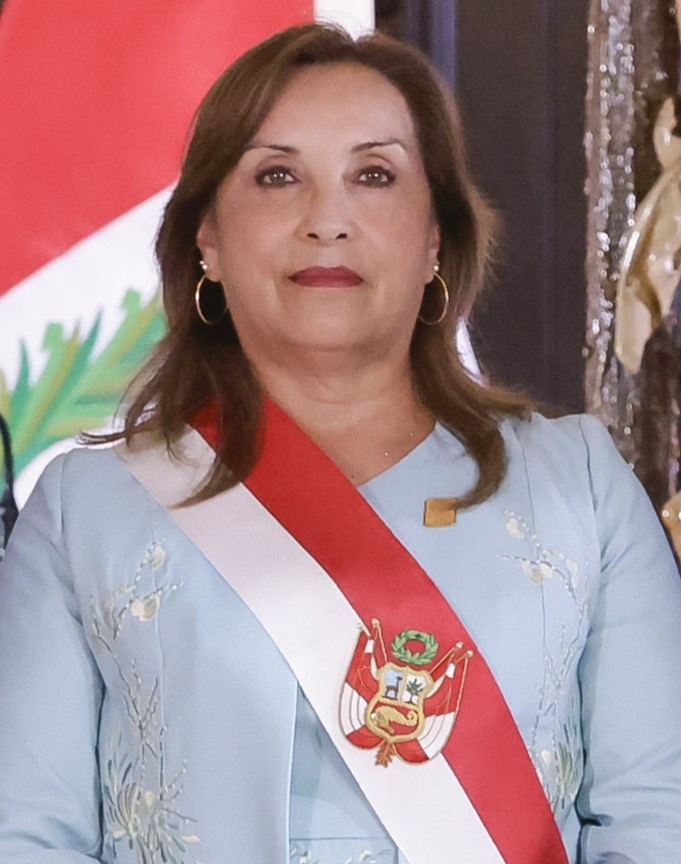
- Boluarte in 2024

President of Peru
- In office 7 December 2022 – 10 October 2025
- Prime Minister: Pedro Angulo Arana; Alberto Otárola; Gustavo Adrianzén; Eduardo Arana Ysa
- Vice President: First Vice President Vacant; Second Vice President Vacant
- Preceded by: Pedro Castillo
- Succeeded by: José Jerí

First Vice President of Peru
- In office 28 July 2021 – 7 December 2022
- President: Pedro Castillo
- Preceded by: Martín Vizcarra (2018)
- Succeeded by: Luis Galarreta (2026)

Minister of Development and Social Inclusion
- In office 29 July 2021 – 26 November 2022
- Prime Minister: Guido Bellido; Mirtha Vásquez; Héctor Valer; Aníbal Torres
- Preceded by: Silvana Vargas
- Succeeded by: Cinthya Lindo Espinoza

Personal details
- Born: Dina Ercilia Boluarte Zegarra; 31 May 1962 (age 64) Chalhuanca, Peru
- Party: Independent (2022–present)
- Other political affiliations: Free Peru (2017–2022)
- Spouse: David Gómez Villasante (m. 1992; div. 2010)
- Children: 2
- Education: University of San Martín de Porres (LLB)

Dina Ercilia Boluarte Zegarra (Note: Spanish pronunciation: [ˈdina eɾˈsilja βoˈlwaɾte seˈɣara],) (born 31 May 1962) is a Peruvian politician, civil servant, and lawyer who served as the president of Peru from 7 December 2022 until she was removed from office on 10 October 2025. She had previously served as the first vice president and minister at the Ministry of Development and Social Inclusion under President Pedro Castillo. She served as an officer at the National Registry of Identification and Civil Status (RENIEC) from 2007 until 2022.

Boluarte is the first woman to become President of Peru. She was a member of Free Peru but never fully embraced the party's Marxism–Leninism, and was sworn in following Castillo's attempt to dissolve Congress and subsequent impeachment and arrest. Despite describing herself as a "progressive and moderate leftist", observers labeled Boluarte's administration as conservative, opportunistic, and illiberal. Boluarte aligned herself with the right-wing majority of the Peruvian Congress, and received support from the Peruvian Armed Forces. Boluarte's use of military and the police against protestors has been controversial.

During her first months as president, protests against her government emerged across Peru, during which authorities perpetrated the Ayacucho massacre and Juliaca massacre. Analysts said that Boluarte's crackdown on protestors has undermined democracy. Despite international concerns, Boluarte praised the actions of the armed forces. At the same time the protests occurred, she faced the impact of Cyclone Yaku, the dengue epidemic, the diplomatic conflict with various Latin American countries calling for Castillo’s reinstatement as president, the earthquake in Tumbes, and the migration crisis on the border with Chile.

She became chronically unpopular, with a historic low of 2% approval as of March 2025. As such, she was labeled "the world's least popular leader" and the "most unpopular leader in the world". On 10 October 2025, Boluarte was impeached and removed from office by the Peruvian Congress in a 122–0 vote amidst a security crisis and renewed civil unrest against her rule. She was succeeded as President of Peru by José Jerí, the president of Congress.

== Early life and education ==
Boluarte was born in a Quechua-speaking peasant family, in the village of Chalhuanca, Apurímac, on 31 May 1962. She graduated as a lawyer from the University of San Martín de Porres and later did postgraduate studies at the university. Her upbringing in poverty has not shielded her from accusations of exploiting her indigenous roots for political gain.

== Early career ==
In 2004, Boluarte co-authored a book, The Recognition of Human Rights and International Humanitarian Law, which was later investigated for plagiarism after 55% of the text included was marked as plagiarized from a 2002 post on the National Human Rights Commission of Mexico's website according to Turnitin software. She has worked at National Registry of Identification and Civil Status as an attorney and officer since 2007. She ran unsuccessfully for mayor of Lima's Surquillo district in 2018, representing the Free Peru party. She also participated in the extraordinary parliamentary elections in 2020 for Free Peru, though she did not obtain a congressional seat.

== Vice presidency (2021–2022) ==
=== Election ===
In the 2021 presidential election, Boluarte was part of the presidential ticket of Pedro Castillo, which was victorious in the run-off. During the campaign, Boluarte was widely viewed to position herself more moderately than Castillo, saying that she would not support overriding the Constitutional Court of Peru, but still stated "the wealthy middle class of Lima will surely cease to be a wealthy middle class". Boluarte also said that if Castillo were to be removed from office, she would resign in support of him. While campaigning in Piura, Diario Correo reported on counter-terrorism police documents that alleged Boluarte was seen working beside members of MOVADEF, an alleged arm of Shining Path.

=== Conflicts with Free Peru ===
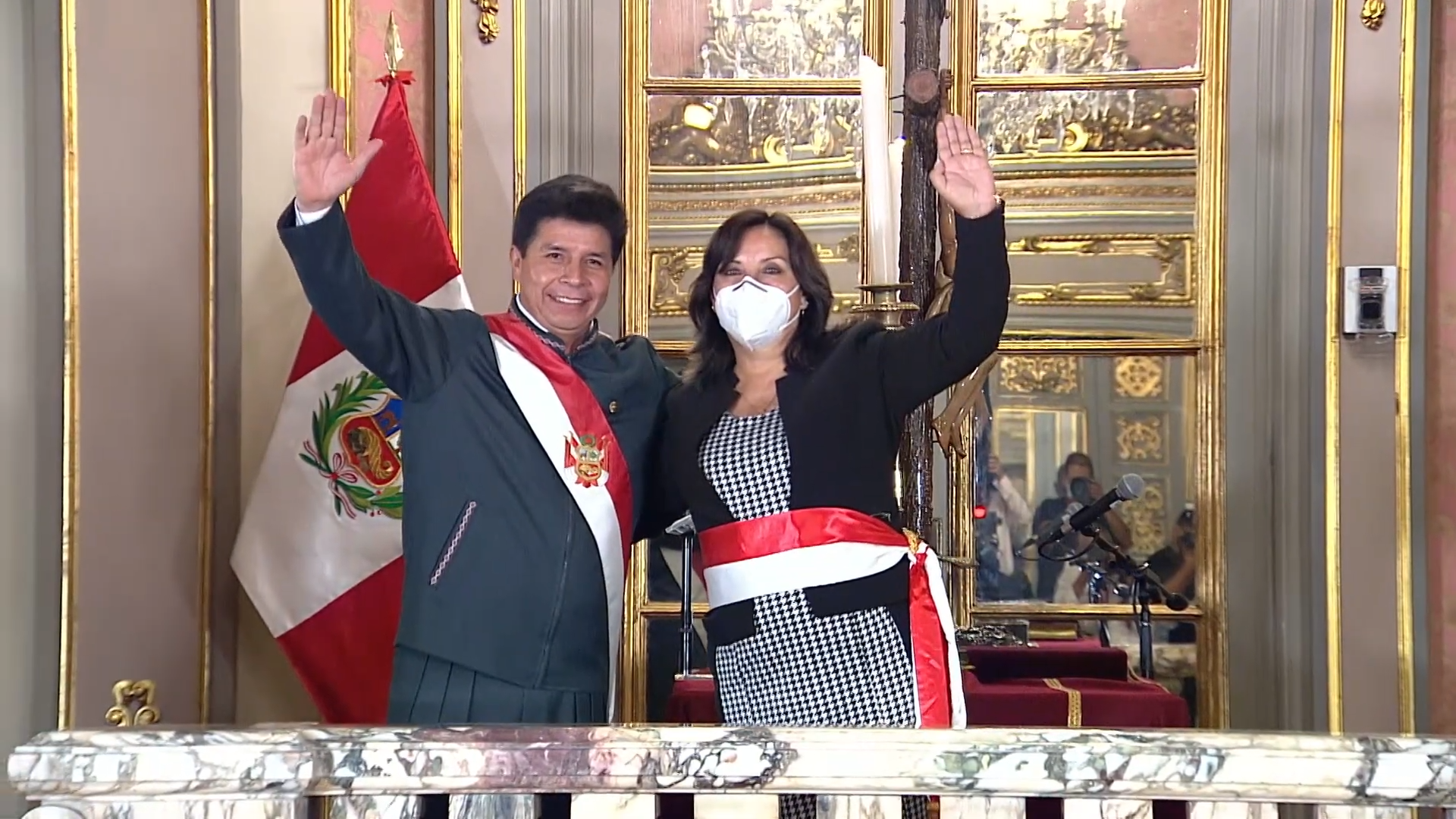
Boluarte with Castillo at Palacio de Gobierno in 2022

On 29 July 2021, Boluarte was appointed minister of Development and Social Inclusion in the government of Castillo. On 23 January 2022, during an interview with La República, Boluarte stated that she never embraced the ideology of Free Peru. The party's general secretary, Vladimir Cerrón, subsequently expelled Boluarte from Free Peru and posted on Twitter, "Always loyal, traitors never". Cerrón also claimed that Boluarte's comment threatened party unity. Party members later requested her expulsion, stating Boluarte "does nothing more than create division and discredit the image" of Cerrón.

On 25 November 2022, Boluarte resigned from her position as the minister of Development and Social Inclusion, but remained as first vice president. On 5 December 2022, after voting 13 in favor and 8 against, a constitutional complaint was filed by the Subcommittee on Constitutional Accusations against Boluarte, alleging that she operated a private club named the Apurímac Club (Spanish: Club Departamental de Apurímac) while she was minister of Development.

== Presidency (2022–2025) ==
=== Inauguration ===
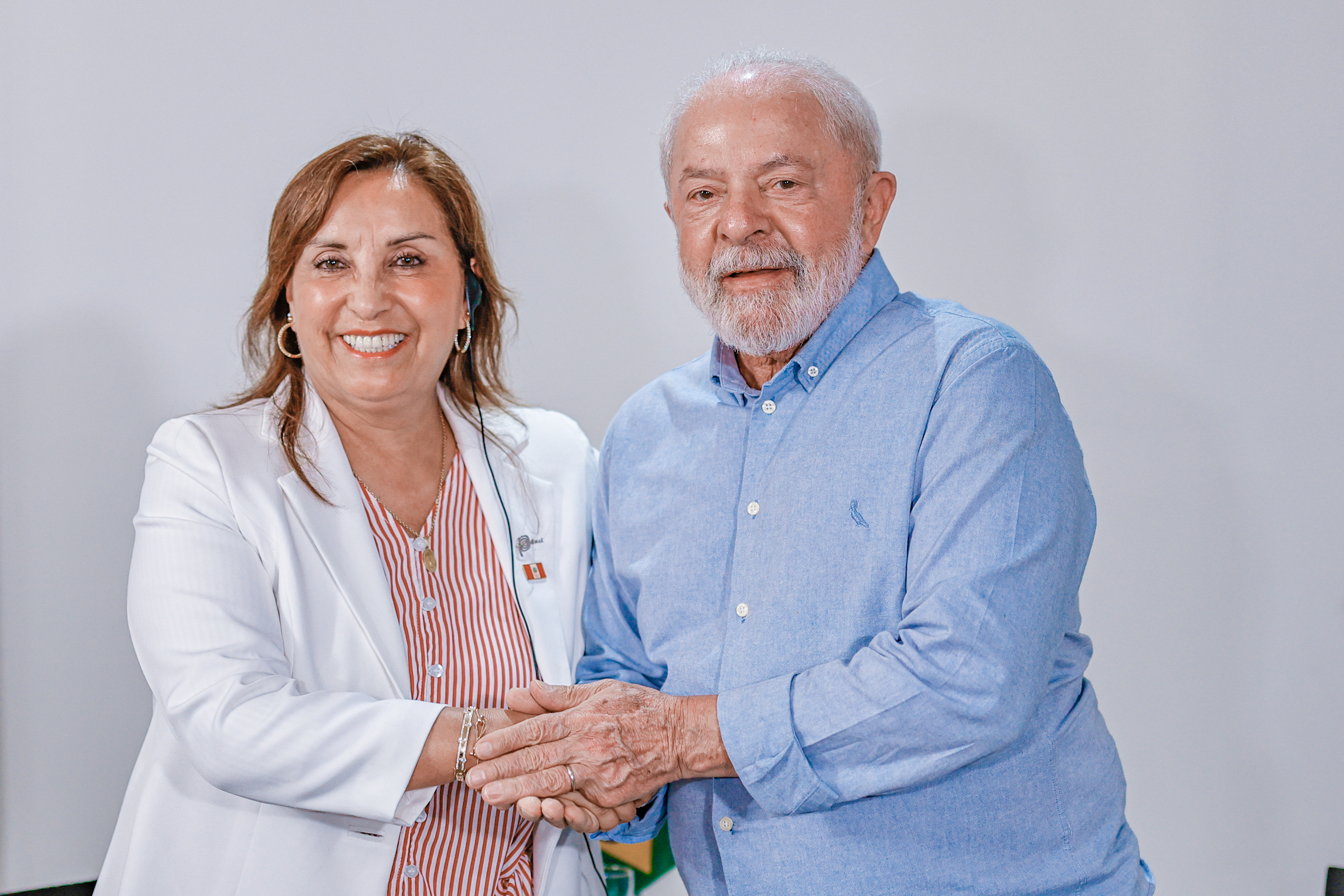
President Boluarte with Brazilian President Luiz Inácio Lula da Silva, August 2023

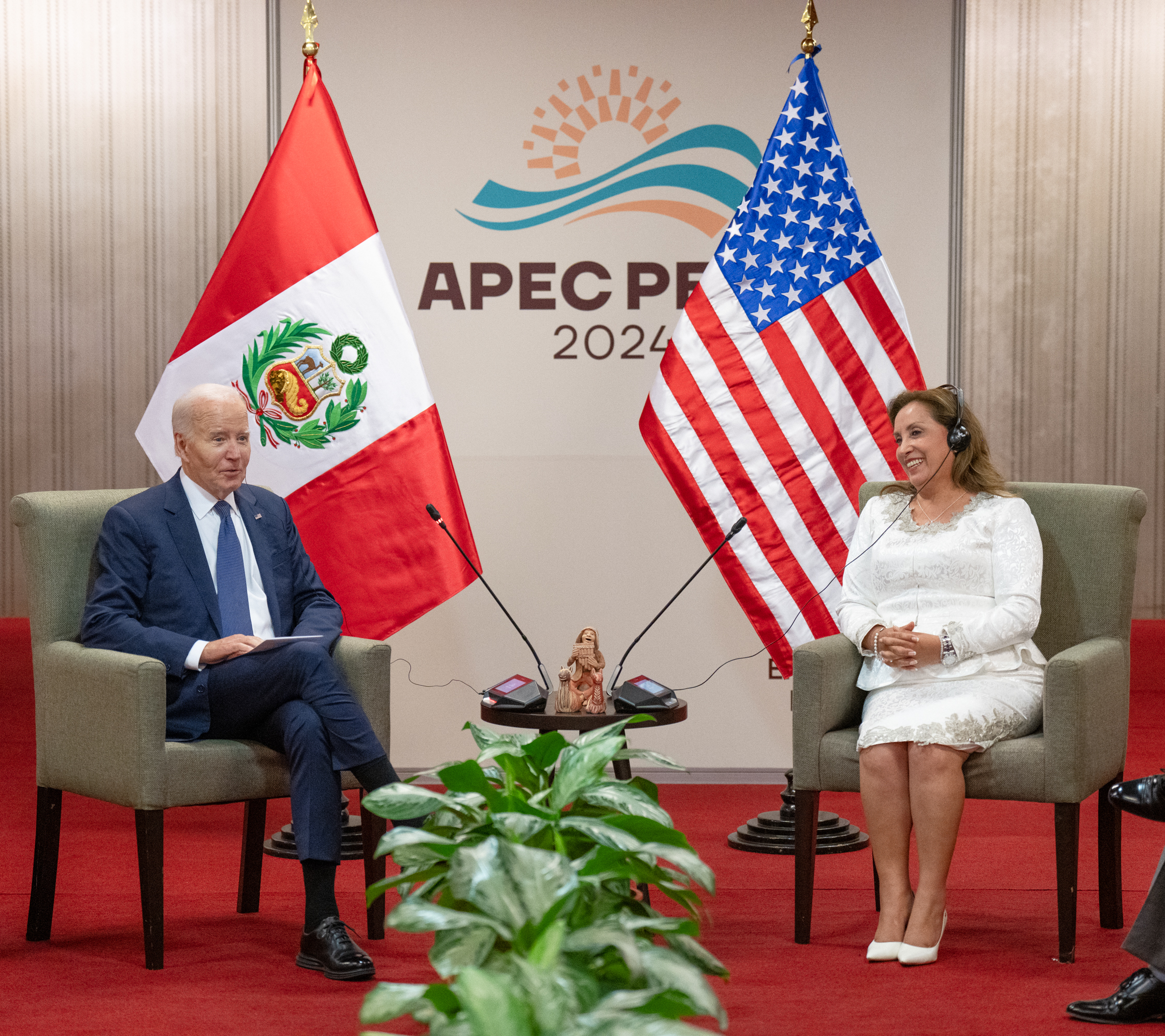
President Boluarte with US President Joe Biden at the APEC Summit in Peru, November 2024

On 7 December 2022, during the Peruvian political crisis, after Pedro Castillo attempted to dissolve the Congress of the Republic of Peru during impeachment proceedings against him, Boluarte condemned the move as a "breakdown of the constitutional order" and assumed the presidency after the impeachment of Castillo. Boluarte thus became Peru's first female president. Boluarte's presidency was the most recent instance in Peruvian history where the first vice president succeeded a president who could no longer serve, after First Vice President Martín Vizcarra became president upon the resignation of President Pedro Pablo Kuczynski in 2018. Peru had seven presidents from 2015 to 2022.

In her first speech to the Congress, she denounced President Castillo and declared her will to form a national unity government to resolve the present political crisis. In the formation of her government, she consulted all the major parties, but selected no members of Congress. Instead she formed what was widely viewed as a technocratic government led by Pedro Angulo Arana, an attorney who faced 13 criminal investigations as of his appointment in December 2022, including abuse of authority, abuse of public administration, abuse of public faith, blackmail, extortion and others. Observers commented that with growing protests and an undefined support base, Boluarte's government would likely not be given the space, either by Congress or the people, to succeed.

==== Recognition ====
International recognition of Boluarte's government has been mixed. Members of the São Paulo Forum like Luiz Inácio Lula da Silva of Brazil and Gabriel Boric of Chile recognize Boluarte. The United States has recognized Boluarte as president. Spain was also in support, championing a return to "constitutional order." Bolivia, Colombia, Honduras, Mexico and Venezuela supported Pedro Castillo as the President of Peru following the events in December 2022 and refused to recognize Boluarte. The issue of international recognition soon after became irrelevant as she received recognition as the legitimate president from most international leaders.

=== Programs ===
During her administration, measures were promoted to stimulate economic recovery and unblock stalled infrastructure projects (such as Chavimochic III and Majes-Siguas I), and the San Martín Solar Power Plant and the Quebrada Huaycoloro Project were inaugurated. Social programs were created (such as “Ciclo Olímpico” and “Gratitud”) while others were restructured and social strategies were promoted (such as “Wasiymi”); the registration of FENATE (Pedro Castillo's union) was revoked; the so-called “Bicentennial Schools” were built, along with sanitation projects; the defense industry was modernized; the National Infrastructure Authority (ANIN) was created and infrastructure management was restructured;

The network of public pharmacies (FARMAMINSA) and MINSA Móvil were created; the New Social Housing Program (Nueva VIS) was launched, along with the “Centennial Hospitals,” “Mil,” and “Wolbachia” initiatives;

A neutral foreign policy was maintained although bilateral relations with the People’s Republic of China were strengthened and efforts were made to attract foreign investment; APEC 2024 was held (where she inaugurated the Port of Chancay alongside Xi Jinping);

Mental health was incorporated into the national education curriculum, and suicide prevention among students was promoted; the removal of teaching staff indicted or convicted of sexual abuse or terrorism was promoted; Peru’s claim to Santa Rosa Island was defended during the border incident with Colombia, and efforts were made to establish a Peruvian spaceport and implement railway development measures (such as the modernization of the Macho Train).

=== Protests ===
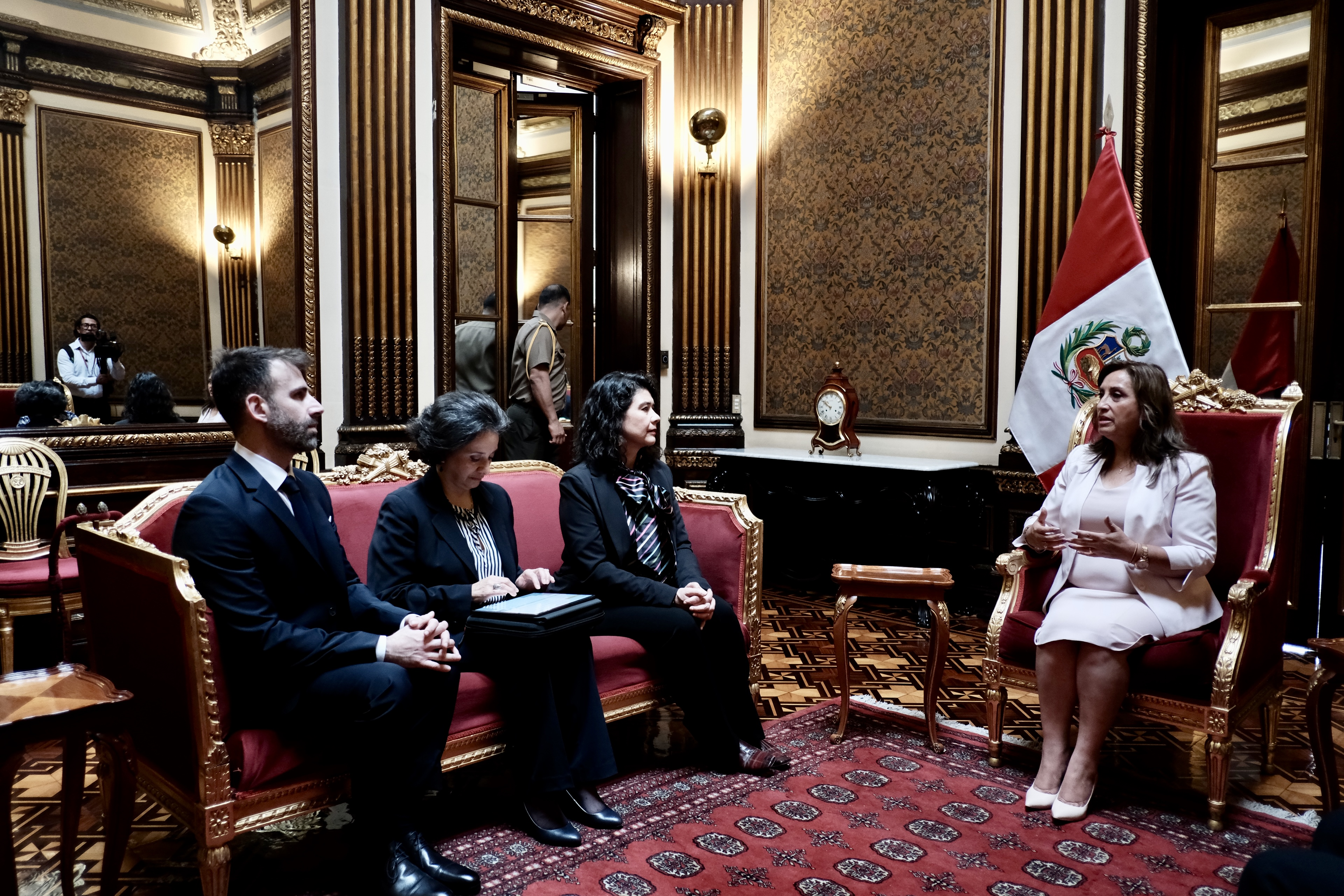
IACHR representatives meeting with President Boluarte during the 2022 Peruvian political protests

According to CNN, the Boluarte government "has responded to protesters with both stick and carrot; President Boluarte has offered the possibility of holding early elections, while her Defense Minister Luis Alberto Otárola ... declared a state of emergency and deployed troops to the street." The New York Times would describe Boluarte's response as "hawkish". On 12 December, following protests that broke out after the removal of Pedro Castillo, President Boluarte announced that she and Congress agreed to move the next general election from April 2024 to April 2026. On 14 December, Alberto Otárola, Boluarte's defense minister, declared a state of emergency for 30 days to quell "acts of violence and vandalism."

Responding to protests, Boluarte said she does not understand why anyone would protest against her and supported the repressive response of authorities. Boluarte's response has been widely condemned by NGOs, while being supported by more right-leaning parties in Congress. Amnesty International's Americas head Erika Guevara-Rosas called for governmental restraint, saying: "State repression against protesters is only deepening the crisis in Peru." Protests have for the most part, been the most fierce and disruptive in Quechua majority regions, the center of Castillo's support. Given the harshness of the Boluarte government's response, this has led some to draw comparison between Boluarte's actions and that of previous anti-Native governments of Peru, which drew comparisons between indigenous groups and the Shining Path, as to persecute them. Boluarte would also state that the demonstrations occurred due to blackmail and provocations by Bolivian officials, something the Inter-American Commission on Human Rights said they did not observe while The New York Times said that "The government has yet to provide clear evidence to back up ... claims of high-level coordination by a terrorist organization or illicit funding behind the violent attacks."

"We don't have any power over them. I can be the Supreme Chief of the Armed Forces, but I have no command and the protocols are decided by them"

— Dina Boluarte

The government appointed ex-colonel Juan Carlos Liendo to head the National Intelligence Service, who claimed that the demonstrations in the country were not social in nature but part of a "terrorist insurrection. This appointment comes as a surprise, since Juan Carlos Liendo is close to right-wing political groups and claimed that the government of Pedro Castillo, to which Dina Boluarte belonged, was an "extension of the terrorist group Shining Path. In a joint statement in January 2023, over 2,000 academics and researchers expressed their "strongest rejection of the authoritarian course that the government of Dina Boluarte and Alberto Otárola" and believed "that these are not isolated events but a pattern of conduct that places us in a dangerous transition to authoritarianism", concluding that "If President Boluarte is only able to offer the country confrontation and violence, she should resign". Notable signers included Steven Levitsky, Lucía Dammert, Martín Tanaka, Daniel Alarcón, Josep Joan Moreso, Gerardo L. Munck, Mirtha Vásquez, Sara Beatriz Guardia and Carmen Mc Evoy.

Amnesty International reported in May 2023 that Boluarte "consistently supported and justified the actions of law enforcement agencies, despite increasingly clear evidence of their unlawful actions" and that her government "stigmatized protesters as terrorists and violent, contributing to the escalation of violence and encouraging law enforcement to continue to act in the same way". Boluarte would respond to criticism saying that she did not have control of the Peruvian Armed Forces. Since at least December 2022, opposition protesters often chant the slogan Dina asesina ("Dina the Murderer") and even sing a song of the same name. Moreover, social and political opponents have nicknamed her "Dina Balearte" (blending of her name and balearte, "to shoot you") as a reference to aforementioned deaths.

==== Ayacucho massacre and cabinet reorganization ====
On 15 December 2022, the Peruvian Army massacred protesters in Ayacucho demonstrating against the Boluarte government. During the protests, the situation intensified when the military deployed helicopters to fire at protesters, who later tried to take over the city's airport, which was defended by the Peruvian Army and the National Police of Peru. Troops responded by firing live ammunition at protesters, resulting in ten dead and 61 injured; 90% of the injured had gunshot wounds while those killed were shot in the head or torso. The founder of the Peruvian Forensic Anthropology Team (EPAF), forensic anthropologist Carmen Rosa Cardoza, analysed evidence surrounding those who were killed, saying that the military was shooting to kill and that the gunshot wounds in the head and torso were consistent with wounds suffered during human rights violations, explaining that wounds during an armed conflict are usually found on the extremities. Gloria Cano, attorney for the Association for Human Rights (Aprodeh) who analyzed human rights abuses during the internal conflict in Peru, said officers likely ordered troops to simply "eliminate the enemy" and did not specify actions to take against protesters, with the attorney stating officers "had to explain to them that in case of need they had to shoot into the air, to the ground. If they take them out without giving them specific orders, they will do what they learn, which is to shoot the vital segments of the human body".

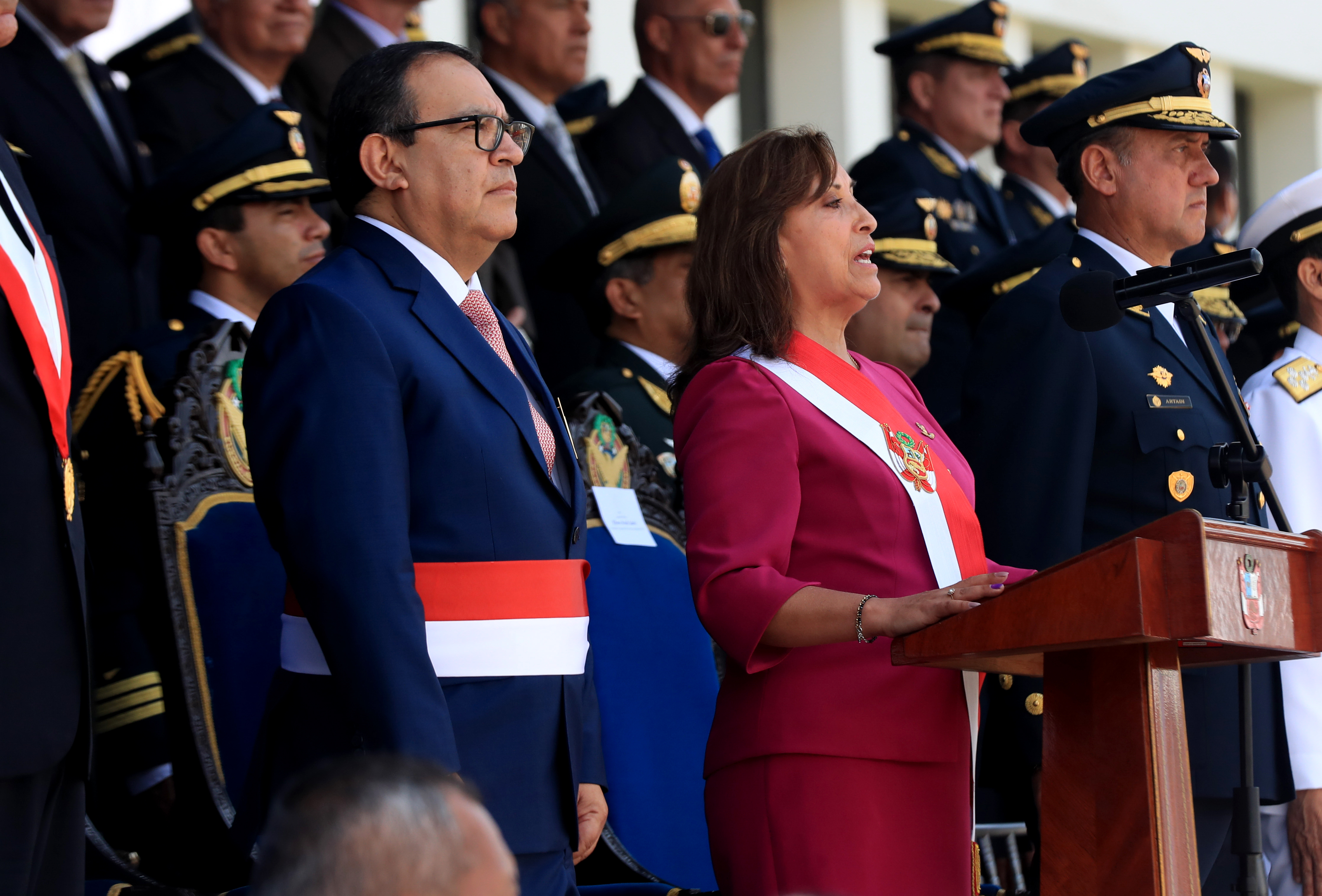
Boluarte with Alberto Otárola as Defense Minister on 15 December 2022

Sources close to Boluarte, according to La Republica, reported that she wanted to resign from the presidency following the massacre, though defense minister Alberto Otárola convinced her that if she were to resign, he and other ministers would lose their immunity and possibly be prosecuted for crimes. Otárola then promised to Boluarte that he could build support for her from the Peruvian Armed Forces and right-wing groups according to La Republica. Boluarte would then make Otárola her prime minister on 21 December 2022. In addition to the prime minister, she named a new interior minister, defense minister and education minister. Boluarte's new Minister of Education, Óscar Becerra, was reported to have a history of being a Fujimorist and making homophobic comments.

==== Juliaca massacre ====
At least 18 people were killed and over 100 injured by police responding to protests in Juliaca, with all of the deaths being attributed to gunshot wounds. While discussing the violence, Boluarte said that Bolivia was responsible, stating "Today we know that a type of firearms and ammunition would have entered the country through southern Peru" and that protesters were not shot by authorities, saying the ammunition found in victims was used "neither by the National Police nor by the Armed Forces".

According to La República, videos and photographic evidence showed that the PNP used long rifles to fire at demonstrators and individuals nearby. Dany Humpire Molina, former manager of Expertise at the Public Prosecutor's Office and a doctor in forensic science, stated: "The projectiles seem to have been fired by AKM rifles, which is weapons used by the National Police, ... If the bullets were found inside the body, they are described as penetrating. When the shots are of a penetrating type, as is the case, they are long-distance. And if the necropsy protocol determines that they went from behind, it means that, at the time of the shooting, the demonstrators were running, fleeing." Edgar Stuardo Ralón Orellana of the Inter-American Commission on Human Rights, stated "we do not find in people something that said that they are responding to some kind of another organization, but an authentic manifestation of a discontent with the abandonment that that region (Puno) has historically had." The former head of the National Directorate of Intelligence (DINI), General Wilson Barrantes Mendoza, also criticized the Boluarte's response, stating that accusations of foreign involvement were "a distraction to confuse the population, noting that it has an external component. Everything we are experiencing is internal" and that the accusation of "a 'terrorist inurgency' is stupid".

==== Legal action ====
On 10 January 2023, Attorney General of Peru Patricia Benavides announced investigations for the alleged crimes of genocide, aggravated homicide and serious injuries against Boluarte, along with Prime Minister Alberto Otárola, Minister of the Interior Víctor Rojas and Minister of Defense Jorge Chávez. Groups in Congress opposed to Boluarte then opened an impeachment motion against her on 25 January 2023, citing moral incapacity. In January 2025, she appeared before prosecutors to explain allegations that she took a 2-week break from serving as president in July 2023 to undergo plastic surgery. Boluarte maintains that it was a medical necessity.

==== Vacancy motions ====
In April 2023, Boluarte faced a vacancy motion due to her response to the protests against her, though Congress voted against proceedings against her. A second motion for vacancy was opened in October 2023 due to some left-wing benches in Congress believing that Boluarte violated Article 115 of the constitution for leading Peru without congressional approval, especially since she did not have a vice president, though right-wing members of Congress refused to vote for the proceedings. On 1 April 2024, a third motion for vacancy was opened by lawmakers from various parties, citing tax investigations against Boluarte and her failure to solve other issues such as crime. Another vacancy motion was filed on 17 May citing "moral incapacity" in the wake of investigations into her ownership of luxury watches and the arrest of her brother on suspicion of influence-peddling, in addition to the dissolution of a police anti-corruption unit.

=== Rolexgate ===
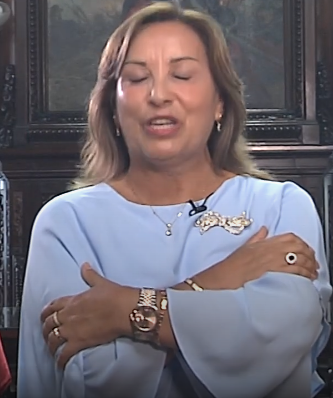
Boluarte in December 2023, wearing a Rolex Datejust

In March 2024, the Public Ministry of Peru began investigating Boluarte for graft and illicit enrichment after she was seen wearing luxury Rolex watches at public events, with the controversy being dubbed "Rolexgate". Boluarte's use of Rolex watches was first reported by news website La Encerrona on 14 March 2024; the website reviewed about 10,000 images and detailed how her watches became increasingly luxurious as her time in public office progressed. Reviewing La Encerrona's work, the Associated Press noted that one of the Rolex watches Boluarte used was three times her monthly salary.

When asked about her watches at a press conference on 15 March, Boluarte said "what I have is the result of my effort and my work". While Boluarte said that the Rolex watch was a dated model, La República contacted an American watch store that said the model was possibly from 2023 and valued it at US$19,535, with the newspaper saying that Boluarte's response was "an alleged contradiction". Days later, Henry Shimabukuro, a businessman who assisted with Boluarte's political campaign, said that assistants for Boluarte suggested gifts of jewelry when meeting with her.

A preliminary investigation was opened by the Public Ministry on 18 March 2024 to investigate Boluarte on allegations of illicit enrichment. The Financial Intelligence Unit of the Superintendency of Banks and Insurance Companies (SBS) said that Boluarte received 1.1 million Peruvian soles (US$330,000) from unidentified accounts between 2016 and 2022, according to a report by El Comercio on 25 March. On 29 March, La Republica identified a Cartier bracelet used by Boluarte that was 18 carat gold, covered with 204 diamonds and had an estimated value of more than US$54,000.

On 30 March 2024, about 20 police and 20 public ministry officials raided Boluarte's home in Surquillo, breaking down her door with a sledgehammer while saying their involvement was "for the purpose of search and seizure." After searching her home, the authorities then entered the Government Palace for further investigations; Boluarte was present. Boluarte's prime minister, Gustavo Adrianzén, condemned the actions of authorities, stating "The political noise that is being made is serious, affecting investments and the entire country... What has happened in the last few hours are disproportionate and unconstitutional actions." Six ministers of her new cabinet resigned following the incident.

=== Other controversies ===
==== Prime ministers ====
Boluarte's first prime minister Pedro Angulo Arana was dismissed a week after his appointment. In March 2024, investigations revealed that Boluarte's next prime minister Alberto Otárola had benefited a friend, Yaziré Pinedo Vásquez later revealed to be a romantic interest, with public contracts as Minister of Defense. Otárola then resigned, after it was revealed he faked audio from 2021 to hide his relationship with Vásquez. Otárola's replacement Gustavo Adrianzén served until May 2025 when he resigned amid a threats of a censure vote caused by the kidnapping and killing of 13 miners by illegal miners earlier in the month, amid rising crime. He was replaced by Minister of Justice Eduardo Arana Ysa, who remains under investigation for ties to a criminal organization led by former judge César Hinostroza, unpaid alimony, and influence peddling.

==== Family controversies ====
In November 2023, the Public Ministry summoned Dina Boluarte's brother, Nicanor, for the alleged crime of collusion when he allocated money to five public works in Nanchoc District, Cajamarca province. According to former assistant Maritza Sánchez for La República, Nicanor had a relevant position for her mandate due to his close ties with authorities. In response, Boluarte said that "the relative they mentioned" is not affiliated with the State, so she indicated that her brother can receive "whoever he wants". Since then, she accused the Sunday newspaper Cuarto poder for broadcasting reports that according to her "are programmatically [defaming] my brother". Nicanor continued to appear in leaked audio recordings about new unqualified hires and, according to one of the witnesses close to the Boluarte brothers, the Peruvian Sports Institute had been used to make irregular hires. Nicanor was arrested in May 2024, while his political party was founded in January 2025.

=== International trips ===
In June 2024, Boluarte and five ministers undertook a state visit to China. Trade ties between Peru and China were discussed throughout the visit. Boluarte met with General Secretary Xi Jinping, along with other Chinese government and business leaders. In May 2025, Boluarte traveled to Rome to attend the inaugural mass of Pope Leo XIV, a citizen of Peru who had spent years as a missionary and later bishop in the country.

=== Impeachment ===
The continuing security crisis, combined with numerous corruption controversies, cost Boluarte support among her allies in Congress. In October, Congress considered four articles of impeachment against Boluarte. Congress summoned her to present her defense. On 10 October 2025, Congress voted to remove Boluarte from office on grounds of "permanent moral incapacity" with a total of 122 votes, exceeding the 87 votes (out of 130) needed to impeach her. She refused to appear in Congress to defend herself, denied all the accusations against her, and listed all the achievements of her administration. At the same session José Jerí, President of the Congress, was named her successor. A request by the State Prosecutor's Office to prevent Boluarte from leaving Peru was rejected on 15 October by a court.

== Political ideology ==
During the 2021 Peruvian general election, Boluarte was part of Free Peru, a left-leaning and socialist-influenced party; after she was expelled from the party in 2022, she adopted more right-wing views and appointed conservative figures in her cabinet. Analysts described Boluarte's government as authoritarian, saying that she had allied with right wing and far-right groups in Congress following her ascension to the presidency.

According to La República, analysts reported that Boluarte's political inexperience resulted with her shifting from a left-wing ideology in support of rural constituents towards a right-wing ideology that repressed previous supporters. Americas Quarterly observed that after Boluarte was expelled from the Peru Libre party, she aligned with the right-wing Congress for political support instead of the constituents that elected her, creating a feeling of betrayal for rural and indigenous voters. According to political scientist David Sulmont, Boluarte sought to be expelled from the party because she predicted Castillo would be removed from office and that she could assume the presidency.

Political scientist Daniel Encinas described Boluarte as an "opportunist", noting that although she was elected vice president under a left-wing government, she aligned with right-wing figures in Congress following her accession to the presidency. Sociologist Carlos Reyna, discussing Boluarte's response to protests, stated: "A person who manages, covers up and supports the armed and police forces to shoot the bodies of unarmed civilians cannot say that he belongs to a moderate variant, ... Boluarte looks like ... the worst versions of the extreme right." Sulmont said that Boluarte became a figurehead for Congress, serving the legislative body as a "shield between the population and the right-wing Congress" due to her sacrificing her political legitimacy by resorting to repression. In April 2023, Boluarte declared a state of emergency in all border areas with Ecuador, Colombia, Brazil, Bolivia, and Chile to increase "control of foreign citizens", blaming Venezuelan migrants for the crime in the country.

== Public opinion ==
Approval rating polling of the Boluarte government

In January 2023, the first public opinion poll for Boluarte was collected by the Institute of Peruvian Studies (IEP). In the poll, 71% of respondents disapproved of Boluarte and 19% approved of her, while 80% of respondents disagree with Boluarte assuming the presidency. A Datum poll in mid-2023 showed a disapproval rate of 77% among respondents, though an Ipsos Perú poll showed that 71% of Peruvian CEOs approved of Boluarte and 88% approved of her maintaining the presidency until 2026. A poll conducted by the IEP in October 2023 saw 84% of respondents say that they disapproved of the way Boluarte was leading the country, with only 10% of respondents approving of Boluarte's presidency. 90% of respondents felt that the performance of Congress suffered under Boluarte's leadership. According to an October 2024 Ipsos poll, her approval ratings had declined further to 4 percent. In December 2024, a poll by Datum reported just 3% approval for Boluarte, the lowest known for any president in Peru's history. Previously, journalist Noah Hurowitz called her "the world's least popular president" in a piece for The Intercept. In March 2025, Ipsos Perú published another opinion poll in which, while getting a mean of 4% approval, it found zero percent approval in the departments of the Center of Peru.

== Personal life ==
Boluarte, who is a native Spanish speaker, is also fluent in Quechua, her heritage language. She was married for many years to David Gómez Villasante. They have two sons, David Eduardo Gómez Boluarte and Daniel Felwig Gómez Boluarte. The latter son was present at Boluarte's residence and refused to open the door to the police and prosecutor during the April 2024 house raid mandated by a Supreme Court judge. She has a brother, Nicanor Boluarte, who was arrested in 2024 on suspicion of influence peddling. His political party, Citizens for Peru (Ciudadanos Por el Perú), was registered on 18 January 2025. In March 2025, it was revealed Boluarte may have had a romantic relationship during her presidency with her former Club Apurímac coworker Juan Olazábal Segovia, as evidenced by private phone chats. Boluarte's lawyer denied such a romantic affiliation.

Boluarte has publicly declared herself a Catholic and, during her term in office, has visited both Pope Francis and Pope Leo XIV. However, in May 2025, it was revealed that Boluarte had Protestant pastor Anthony Lastra as her spiritual advisor, who had even been offered the opportunity to establish an evangelical chaplaincy in the Government Palace. Lastra denied such pastoral ties with Boluarte. Likewise, in November 2024, it was revealed that Boluarte used a “witchcraft doll” or “voodoo doll” that was found among her personal belongings.

== Honours ==
- Indonesia:
  - Star of Mahaputera, 1st Class – 11 August 2025
- South Korea:
  - Recipient of the Grand Order of Mugunghwa - 17 November 2024

== Electoral history ==
Year	Office	Type	Party	Main opponent	Party	Votes for Boluarte				Result	Swing
Year	Office	Type	Party	Main opponent	Party	Total	%	P.	±%	Result	Swing
2018	Mayor of Surquillo	Municipal	Libertarian Peru	Giancarlo Casassa	Christian People's Party	2,014	2.80%	9th	N/A	Lost	N/A
2020	Congresswoman from Lima	Parliamentary Snap	Free Peru	N/A	N/A	4,827	2.06%	16th	N/A	Lost	N/A
2021	First Vice President of Peru	General	Free Peru	Luis Galarreta	Popular Force	2,724,752	18.92%	1st	N/A	Advanced into runoff	N/A
2021	First Vice President of Peru	General	Free Peru	Luis Galarreta	Popular Force	8,836,380	50.13%	1st	N/A	Won	Gain

== Notes ==
Party political offices
Preceded by Jorge Paredes Terry	Free Peru nominee for First Vice President of Peru; 2021	Most recent
Political offices
Vacant Title last held by Martín Vizcarra	First Vice President of Peru; 2021–2022	Succeeded by Luis Galarreta (2026)
Preceded by Silvana Vargas	Minister of Development and Social Inclusion; 2021–2022	Succeeded by Cinthya Lindo Espinoza
Preceded by Pedro Castillo	President of Peru; 2022–2025	Succeeded by José Jerí
