= Alberto Otárola =

Prime Minister of Peru (2022–2024)

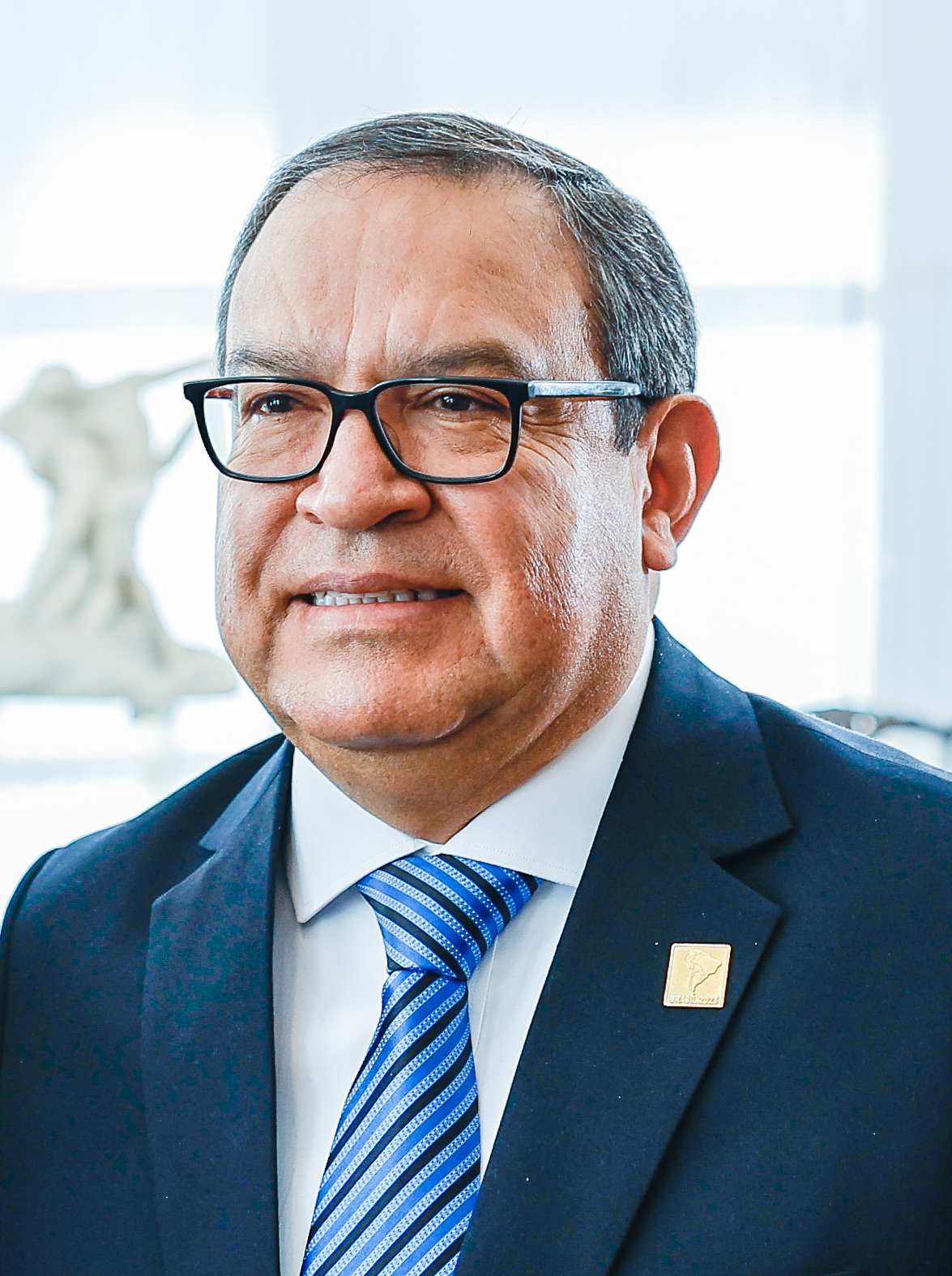
- Otárola in 2023

Prime Minister of Peru
- In office 21 December 2022 – 5 March 2024
- President: Dina Boluarte
- Preceded by: Pedro Angulo Arana
- Succeeded by: Gustavo Adrianzén

Minister of Defense
- In office 10 December 2022 – 21 December 2022
- President: Dina Boluarte
- Prime Minister: Pedro Angulo Arana
- Preceded by: Gustavo Bobbio
- Succeeded by: Jorge Chávez Cresta
- In office 11 December 2011 – 14 May 2012
- President: Ollanta Humala
- Prime Minister: Óscar Valdés
- Preceded by: Daniel Mora
- Succeeded by: José Antonio Urquizo

Personal details
- Born: Luis Alberto Otárola Peñaranda; 12 February 1967 (age 59) Huaraz, Áncash, Peru
- Party: We Are Peru (2024–present)
- Other political affiliations: Peruvian Nationalist Party (2020–2021); Independent (until 2020, 2021–2024)
- Education: University of San Martín de Porres (LLB)
- Profession: Lawyer

Luis Alberto Otárola Peñaranda (born 12 February 1967) is a Peruvian attorney and politician who was the Prime Minister of Peru from 2022 until his resignation in 2024. He previously served as Minister of Defense twice, under Ollanta Humala and Dina Boluarte.

During the Boluarte government, two massacres occurred under his leadership; the Ayacucho massacre while he was defense minister and the Juliaca massacre after he was promoted to the prime minister position. Attorney General of Peru Patricia Benavides announced investigations on 10 January 2023 for the alleged crimes of genocide, aggravated homicide and serious injuries against President Boluarte, along with Prime Minister Otárola.

Dina Boluarte asked for his resignation due to the dissemination of audio leaks in which it appeared that Otárola took advantage of his position to harass women, to whom he offered them jobs in the State.

== Political career ==
=== Presidency of Ollanta Humala ===
==== Minister of Defense (2011–2012) ====
On 10 December 2011, when the first cabinet of President Ollanta Humala was recomposed, he was appointed Minister of Defense.

One of the most critical problems that the Humala government must face is the activity of a gang that operates in the VRAE zone in complicity with drug trafficking. On 9 April 2012, an armed group kidnapped 36 TGP (Transportadora de Gas del Perú) workers in the town of Kepashiato, in the Echarate district of the La Convencion province of the Cusco department. In response, the government launched the so-called "Operation Freedom", which deployed combined military and police forces to the area.

According to the official version, the hostages were released due to pressure from the armed forces (14 April). However, the operation left eight personnel dead and several wounded; even so, it was officially said that it was a "flawless operation." But what most outraged public opinion was that three Dinoes policemen were left to their fate in the jungle after getting off the helicopter that was transporting them, at which time they were attacked on 12 April. One of them, Lander Tamani, was killed in combat. The other two were declared missing. Seventeen days later, one of them, Luis Astuquillca, appeared alive, arriving by his own means in the town of Kiteni, despite being wounded in the leg; while the other, César Vilca, was found dead by his father, after he entered the rugged region on his own, counting only on the support of the locals. Despite this, the Ministry of the Interior issued a statement informing of the appearance of Vilca's body thanks to an intense search by the police.

Public opinion reacted adversely and interpreted that the policemen had been left to their fate; for this reason, they demanded the resignation of Otárola and the Minister of Interior, Daniel Lozada.

On 3 May 2012, the motion of censure against Otárola and Lozada was presented in plenary session of Congress for "incapacity, lack of leadership and strategy." On 10 May, both ministers submitted their resignations, in order to avoid censorship in Congress. Their resignations were accepted by president Humala on 14 May 2012.

=== Drug control activities ===
Between 2014 and 2016, Otárola was the director of DEVIDA, the Peruvian government's drug control administration. In April 2016, Otárola was elected by the United Nations Economic and Social Council as one of the 13 members of the International Narcotics Control Board, an independent treaty body attached to the United Nations Office on Drugs and Crime. His five-year term mandate began on 2 March 2017 and expired on 1 March 2022.

Otárola attempted a political comeback as Ollanta Humala's second running mate and a Nationalist Party congressional candidate at the 2021 general election, although his ticket placed tenth in the election and was not successful in his run for the Peruvian Congress. At the time, he called for a new constitution, saying that the Constitution of Peru was "Fujimorist Constitution", though he would later support the constitution while serving in the Boluarte government.

=== Presidency of Dina Boluarte ===
==== Minister of Defense (2022) ====
Following Pedro Castillo's removal from the Peruvian presidency, Dina Boluarte appointed Otárola to the cabinet as Minister of Defense, on 10 December 2022. On 15 December 2022, the Peruvian Army in Ayacucho massacred protesters demonstrating against the Boluarte government. During the protests, the situation intensified when the military deployed helicopters to fire at protesters, who later tried to take over the city's airport, which was defended by the Peruvian Army and the National Police of Peru. Troops responded by firing live ammunition at protesters, resulting in ten dead and 61 injured; 90% of the injured had gunshot wounds while those killed were shot in the head or torso. The founder of the Peruvian Forensic Anthropology Team (EPAF), forensic anthropologist Carmen Rosa Cardoza, analysed evidence surrounding those who were killed, saying that the military was shooting to kill and that the gunshot wounds in the head and torso were consistent with wounds suffered during human rights violations, explaining that wounds during an armed conflict are usually found on the extremities.

Sources close to President Boluarte, according to La Republica, reported that she wanted to resign from the presidency following the massacre, though Otárola convinced her that if she were to resign, her and other ministers would lose their immunity and possibly be prosecuted for crimes. Otárola then promised to Boluarte that he could build support for her from the Peruvian Armed Forces and right-wing groups according to La Republica. Boluarte would then make Otárola her prime minister on 21 December 2022.

==== Premiership (2022–2024) ====
Less than two weeks into Boluarte's presidency, on 21 December 2022, she appointed Otárola as prime minister, succeeding Pedro Angulo Arana. Following the Juliaca massacre where 18 civilians were killed and over 100 were injured by the Peruvian National Police, Otárola responded to the deaths stating those killed "express a direct responsibility of those who want to carry out a coup d'état in the country" and blamed imprisoned former president Pedro Castillo for the deaths. Wayka criticized Otárola's response, noting that during the 2020 Peruvian protests when two protesters were killed in Lima, Otárola condemned the response of authorities, stating "Arbitrary arrests and pure, hard repression are taking place against legitimate citizen protest". Attorney General of Peru Patricia Benavides announced investigations on 10 January 2023 for the alleged crimes of genocide, aggravated homicide and serious injuries against President Boluarte, along with Prime Minister Otárola, Minister of the Interior Víctor Rojas and Minister of Defense Jorge Chávez.

When the National University of San Marcos was raided by the Peruvian National Police on 12 January 2023, Otárola said that the actions and arrests of 200 people was justified since the university requested assistance, though the university's rector denied that she was aware of any police operation.

On 5 March 2024, Otarola resigned after the television program Panorama released recordings of his alleged conversations with a 25-year old woman named Yazire Pinedo, who had landed two contracts with a total worth of $14,000 to do archive and administrative work for the government. One of the recordings was said to have shown Otarola referring to Pinedo as "my love". However, in his resignation statement, he denied allegations of wrongdoing. Pinedo said the leaked conversations dated back from before Otarola's premiership in 2021, but acknowledged that she had a brief "perhaps sentimental relationship" with him.

== Electoral history ==
Year	Office	Type	Party	Main opponent	Party	Votes for Otárola				Result	Swing	
Year	Office	Type	Party	Main opponent	Party	Total	%	P.	±%	Result	Swing	
1989	Miraflores District Councilman	Municipal	Left Socialist Accord	Enrique del Campo Hohagen	Democratic Front	1,277 (List)	1.86%	4th	N/A	Lost		N/A
1995	Congressman (Nation-wide)	General	Union for Peru	José Daniel Chuan Cabrera	Change 90 - New Majority	629	14.00%	2nd	N/A	Lost		N/A
2011	Congressman from Lima	General	Decentralist Social Force Party	Luisa María Cuculiza	Force 2011	694	0.79%	9th	N/A	Lost		N/A
2021	Congressman from Lima	General	Peruvian Nationalist Party	Yorry Wharton Cortez	Popular Renewal	1,197	0.80%	15th	N/A	Lost		N/A
2021	Second Vice President of Peru	General	Peruvian Nationalist Party	Vladimir Cerrón	Free Peru	230,831	1.60%	13th	N/A	Lost		N/A

Political offices
Preceded by Pedro Angulo Arana	Prime Minister of Peru; 2022–2024	Succeeded by Gustavo Adrianzén
