= List of impeachments of heads of state =

This is a list of formal impeachments, impeachment attempts or impeachment inquiries of presidents, or holders of other offices equivalent to a head of state.

== Successful impeachments ==
Successful removal from office by legislature is indicated in bold:

Name	Country	Title	Date	Charge(s)	Result
**Santiago Peña**	Paraguay	President	November 6, 2026	Breach of trust, Influence peddling, Misappropriation of funds	Impeached and removed from office by the Senate with all 44 votes in favor, after the collapse of Ueno Bank and the loss of millions of its users' savings. Arrested later that same day.
**Andry Rajoelina**	Madagascar	President	October 14, 2025	Treason	Impeached and removed from office by the National Assembly with 130 votes in favor to one blank, after Rajoelina attempted to dissolve the National Assembly while in hiding as a result of the CAPSAT Unit mutiny and protests against him, with the military subsequently assuming power.
**Dina Boluarte**	Peru	President	October 10, 2025	Moral Incapacity	Impeached and removed from office by the Congress of Peru with 122 votes in favor (with 87 required) on October 10, 2025.
Han Duck-soo	South Korea	Prime Minister and Acting President	December 27, 2024	Refusal to appoint Constitutional Court justices	Impeached by the National Assembly; reinstated by the Constitutional Court on March 24, 2025. Choi Sang-mok served as acting president and acting prime minister during Han's impeachment.
**Yoon Suk Yeol**	South Korea	President	December 14, 2024	Unlawful declaration of martial law	Impeached by the National Assembly; removed by the Constitutional Court on April 4, 2025. Han Duck-soo served as acting president until his impeachment on December 27, 2024.
**Pedro Castillo** (2nd time)	Peru	President	December 7, 2022	Moral Incapacity	Impeached and removed from office by the Congress of Peru with 101 votes in favor (with 87 required) on December 7, 2022, following Castillo's attempted dissolution of the Congress of Peru and formation of an emergency government, and call for a constitutional convention to write a new constitution.
Pedro Castillo (1st time)	Peru	President	March 14, 2022	Moral Incapacity	Impeached by the Congress of Peru on March 14, 2022. Acquitted on March 28, 2022.
Sebastián Piñera	Chile	President	November 9, 2021	Openly infringing the Constitution and seriously compromising the honour of the nation	The Chamber of Deputies impeached Piñera by a razor-thin majority of 78 votes (out of 155). Acquitted by the Senate on November 16, 2021.
Ilir Meta	Albania	President	June 9, 2021	Failing to guarantee national unity by backing the opposition in elections	Impeached by the Parliament; overturned by the Constitutional Court on 16 February 2022, ruling that the accusations against him did not violate the constitution.
Donald Trump (2nd time)	United States	President	January 13, 2021	Incitement of insurrection	Impeached by the United States House of Representatives; acquitted by the United States Senate on February 13, 2021. The impeachment article was passed a week before Trump's planned departure from office and his term expired before the Article of Impeachment was delivered to the Senate to allow his trial to begin.
**Martín Vizcarra** (2nd time)	Peru	President	November 2, 2020	Moral Incapacity	Impeached by the Congress of Peru on November 2, 2020. Convicted and removed from the presidency on November 9, 2020, by a supermajority vote. Succeeded in office by the President of Congress, Manuel Merino, through constitutional succession. Merino would only serve six days, leaving office amidst mass public outcry and the killing of protesters.
Martín Vizcarra (1st time)	Peru	President	September 11, 2020	Moral Incapacity	Impeached by the Congress of Peru on September 11, 2020. Acquitted on September 18, 2020.
Donald Trump (1st time)	United States	President	December 18, 2019	Abuse of power, obstruction of Congress	Impeached by the United States House of Representatives; acquitted by the United States Senate on February 5, 2020.
Pedro Pablo Kuczynski (1st time)	Peru	President	December 15, 2017	Moral Incapacity	Impeached by the Congress of Peru on December 15, 2017. Acquitted on December 21, 2017.
**Park Geun-hye**	South Korea	President	December 9, 2016	Abuse of power	Impeached by the National Assembly; removed by the Constitutional Court on March 10, 2017. Hwang Kyo-ahn served as acting president during the impeachment.
**Dilma Rousseff**	Brazil	President	April 17, 2016	Violation of budgetary laws	Suspended from presidential powers and duties on May 12, 2016; removed from office by the Federal Senate on August 31, 2016. First female president to be impeached. Succeeded in office by vice president Michel Temer.
Václav Klaus	Czech Republic	President	March 4, 2013	Treason	Impeached by the Senate, but rejected as moot by the Constitutional Court as his term in office had expired.
**Fernando Lugo**	Paraguay	President	June 21, 2012	Nepotism, insecurity, improper land purchase	Removed from office by the Senate on June 22, 2012; succeeded in office by vice president Federico Franco.
**Lucio Gutiérrez**	Ecuador	President	April 20, 2005	Abandoned his constitutional duties	Impeached by the National Congress on April 20, 2005. Succeeded in office by vicepresident Alfredo Palacio as provisional president.
**Rolandas Paksas**	Lithuania	President	March 31, 2004	Interfering in a privatization transaction, leaking classified information	Removed by the Seimas on April 6, 2004. Succeeded in office by parliament speaker Artūras Paulauskas as acting president.
Roh Moo-hyun	South Korea	President	March 12, 2004	Election law violations	Impeached by the National Assembly; reinstated by the Constitutional Court on May 14, 2004. Goh Kun served as acting president during the impeachment.
**Abdurrahman Wahid**	Indonesia	President	July 23, 2001	Attempting to dissolve Parliament	Removed by the People's Consultative Assembly. Succeeded in office by vice president Megawati Sukarnoputri.
**Alberto Fujimori**	Peru	President	November 22, 2000	Murder, bodily harm, two counts of kidnapping	Fujimori announced his resignation on November 17, 2000. The resignation was rejected by the Congress of Peru, who voted to remove him from office four days later. Succeeded in office by Congress President Valentín Paniagua as constitutional president. Was arrested in 2005 after years in exile, then pardoned by Pedro Pablo Kuczynski in 2017 but the pardon was overturned by the Supreme Court in 2018.
Bill Clinton	United States	President	December 19, 1998	Perjury, obstruction of justice	Impeached by the United States House of Representatives; acquitted by the United States Senate on February 12, 1999.
**Abdalá Bucaram**	Ecuador	President	February 6, 1997	Mental incapacity	Impeached by the National Congress because of concerns about his capacity to act in the office of the presidency on February 6, 1997. Succeeded in office by congress president Fabián Alarcón as provisional president.
Boris Yeltsin	Russia	President	September 22, 1993	Violation of the Constitution	Retained post after an armed standoff with the Supreme Council.
**Carlos Andrés Pérez**	Venezuela	President	March 20, 1993	Embezzlement	Found guilty by the Supreme Court of Venezuela on May 21, 1993; removed by Venezuelan National Congress on August 31, 1993. Succeeded in office by congress president Octavio Lepage as provisional president.
**Abolhassan Banisadr**	Iran	President	June 20, 1981	Anti-revolutionary conduct, ties to political-militant organisations such as MEK	Removed by Ayatollah Khomeini. Succeeded in office by the Provisional Presidential Council.
**Sukarno**	Indonesia	President	March 12, 1967	Allegation of masterminding the 30 September Movement coup against himself	Removed by MPRS. Succeeded in office by chairman of cabinet presidium General Suharto as acting president and later full president.
Café Filho	Brazil	President	November 19, 1955	Coup d'état attempt to prevent Juscelino Kubitschek from taking office, leaving the presidency to Carlos Luz purposefully	Barred from resuming the powers of presidency, after a self-declared incapacity on 8 November 1955, by the Federal Senate on November 22, 1955. The process occurred during the government of Nereu Ramos.
**Carlos Luz**	Brazil	President	November 11, 1955	Coup d'état attempt to prevent Juscelino Kubitschek from taking office	Removed from office by the Federal Senate on November 11, 1955. The impeachment process occurred in one day. Succeeded by Senate president Nereu Ramos.
Andrew Johnson	United States	President	February 24, 1868	Violating the Tenure of Office Act	Impeached by the United States House of Representatives; acquitted by the United States Senate on May 26, 1868.

== Resigned during the impeachment trial ==
Name	Country	Title	Date	Charge(s)	Result
Pedro Pablo Kuczynski (2nd time)	Peru	President	March 15, 2018	Moral Incapacity	Impeached by the Congress of Peru on March 15, 2018. Resigned from the presidency on March 21, 2018. Resignation accepted by Congress on March 23, 2018.
Joseph Estrada	Philippines	President	November 13, 2000	Corruption	Impeached by the House of Representatives of the Philippines; case went to impeachment trial at the Senate but the trial was aborted. Succeeded in office by vice president Gloria Macapagal Arroyo after the 2001 EDSA Revolution. Estrada was later to have been declared by the Supreme Court to have resigned during the revolution
Fernando Collor de Mello	Brazil	President	September 1, 1992	Influence peddling	Resigned from office on December 29, 1992. Succeeded in office by vice president Itamar Franco.

== Resigned during the impeachment attempt ==
Name	Country	Title	Date	Result
Klaus Iohannis	Romania	President	February 10, 2025	Resigned before formal vote.
Robert Mugabe	Zimbabwe	President	November 21, 2017	Resigned before formal vote.
Pervez Musharraf	Pakistan	President	August 18, 2008	Resigned before formal vote. Was convicted in absentia in 2019 and sentenced to death.
Raúl Cubas Grau	Paraguay	President	March 28, 1999	Resigned before formal vote.
Giovanni Leone	Italy	President	June 15, 1978	Resigned before formal vote.
Richard Nixon	United States	President	August 9, 1974	Resigned before formal vote. Was later pardoned by Gerald Ford.

== Failed impeachment attempts ==
Name	Country	Title	Date	Result
Donald Trump	United States	President	December 11, 2025	The United States House of Representatives voted to table the resolution.
Yoon Suk Yeol	South Korea	President	December 7, 2024	It was submitted following his controversial declaration of martial law. It failed after only 195 parliamentarians voted on the motion, five short of the 200 votes needed.
Dina Boluarte	Peru	President	May 17, 2024	Votes for impeachment proceedings failed with Congress of Peru.
Dina Boluarte	Peru	President	April 4, 2024	Votes for impeachment proceedings failed with Congress of Peru voting 33 and 42 for impeachment proceedings out of 52 votes needed. These were submitted following Rolexgate.
Salome Zourabichvili	Georgia	President	October 18, 2023	It failed after only 86 parliamentarians voted on the motion, 14 short of the 100 votes needed.
Dina Boluarte	Peru	President	October 12, 2023	Dismissed due to a lack of signatures after three deputies withdrew their support.
Joe Biden	United States	President	May 18, 2023	Resolution referred to the House Committee on the Judiciary, no further action taken
Guillermo Lasso	Ecuador	President	May 17, 2023	The impeachment proceedings against Lasso were voided when he dissolved the National Assembly by invoking a constitutional measure known as muerte cruzada, triggering the 2023 general election, in which he did not run and was succeeded by Daniel Noboa.
Dina Boluarte	Peru	President	April 5, 2023	Vote for impeachment proceedings failed with Congress of Peru voting 37 for impeachment proceedings out of 52 votes needed.
Pedro Castillo	Peru	President	December 7, 2021	Vote for impeachment proceedings failed with Congress of Peru voting 46 for impeachment proceedings out of 52 votes needed. Exactly a year later, on December 7, 2022, Castillo was successfully impeached and removed following Castillo's 2022 self-coup attempt.
Ilir Meta	Albania	President	July 27, 2020	The Albanian Parliament voted against Meta's impeachment over his unsuccessful attempt to cancel the 2019 local elections.
Sebastián Piñera	Chile	President	December 12, 2019	The National Congress rejected a motion to impeach Piñera for failure to protect human rights, finding that it did not meet the constitutional threshold for impeachment.
Martín Vizcarra	Peru	President	October 1, 2019	The Congress of Peru attempted to impeach and remove Vizcarra after the Peruvian president ordered the dissolution of congress as part of the 2019 Peruvian constitutional crisis. The vote was deemed illegitimate.
Miloš Zeman	Czech Republic	President	September 26, 2019	Not passed
Michel Temer	Brazil	President	June 9, 2017	Dismissed by the Superior Electoral Court.
Rodrigo Duterte	Philippines	President	March 16, 2017	The House Justice Committee threw out the charge by unanimous vote.
Jacob Zuma	South Africa	President	April 5, 2016	Not passed
Benigno Aquino III	Philippines	President	July 21, 2014	The House Justice Committee threw out the charges by a vote of 54–4.
Giorgio Napolitano	Italy	President	February 11, 2014	Not passed
Traian Băsescu	Romania	President	July 29, 2012	Not passed
Barack Obama	United States	President	March 7, 2012	Resolution referred to committee, no further action taken
Gloria Macapagal Arroyo	Philippines	President	November 26, 2008	The House Justice Committee threw out the charges by a vote of 42–8.
George W. Bush	United States	President	June 11, 2008	Resolution referred to committee, no further action taken
Gloria Macapagal Arroyo	Philippines	President	November 26, 2007	Rejected by the House of Representatives of the Philippines through a vote of 184–1.
Traian Băsescu	Romania	President	April 19, 2007	Not passed
Gloria Macapagal Arroyo	Philippines	President	August 24, 2006	Rejected by the House of Representatives of the Philippines through a vote of 173–32.
Gloria Macapagal Arroyo	Philippines	President	August 30, 2005	The House Justice Committee threw out the charges.
Boris Yeltsin	Russia	President	May 15, 1999	Not passed
Boris Yeltsin	Russia	President	March 28, 1993	Not passed
Francesco Cossiga	Italy	President	December 7, 1991	Not passed
Ranasinghe Premadasa	Sri Lanka	President	August 7, 1991	Rejected by the Speaker of the Parliament due to a lack of signatures.
Getúlio Vargas	Brazil	President	June 16, 1954	Rejected by the Chamber of Deputies through a vote of 136–35.
Andrew Johnson	United States	President	December 7, 1867	Impeachment resolution rejected by the United States House of Representatives 57–108. Johnson later separately impeached in February 1868, but acquitted in impeachment trial.
James Buchanan	United States	President	June 16, 1860	Committee found that nothing had been done to warrant impeachment.
John Tyler	United States	President	January 10, 1843	Impeachment resolution rejected by the United States House of Representatives 83–127.

== See also ==
- List of presidents who did not win reelection
- List of prime ministers defeated by votes of no confidence
