= Impeachment of Martín Vizcarra =

The impeachment of Martín Vizcarra may refer to:

- First impeachment process against Martín Vizcarra, initiated on September 11, 2020
- Removal of Martín Vizcarra, initiated on October 8, 2020
