= Vacancy due to moral incapacity =

Political process in Peru

The impeachment of the Presidency of the Republic of Peru by declaration of permanent moral incapacity (Spanish: Vacancia por declaración de permanente incapacidad moral de la Presidencia de la República del Perú) is a unique cause for impeachment of the president of Peru under article 113 of the Constitution of Peru. The term "moral incapacity", introduced in the 1839 constitution, was originally meant to refer to mental disorders, and was juxtaposed to "physical incapacity". However, recent interpretations transformed it into a form of political weapon against the president. The Constitution of Ecuador notably had a similar cause for impeachment, but it was later reworded as "mental incapacity".

The process is different from general impeachment, since it does not require the enumeration of specific criminal violations, originates from a declaration of the Congress of the Republic of Peru, and results directly in the removal of the president from office. General impeachment under article 99, by contrast, is only permitted for four specific crimes (treason, the prevention of or interference with elections, and the dissolution of Congress), has a separate constitutional process, and results in the suspension, rather than removal, of the subject pending the results of the criminal trial. General impeachment is also available for all high-ranking government officials, while impeachment for permanent moral incapacity is reserved for the presidency.

Under Peruvian constitutional doctrine, impeachment for moral incapacity is considered a political trial sui generis. The provision first appeared in the Constitution of Peru of 1839, altought the first use of impeachment dates back to 1823 with the removal of José de la Riva Agüero after a series of military defeats in the wars for independence from Spain. After Spanish troops occupied Lima and forced the revolutionary government to flee to Callao, Congress removed Riva Agüero for his lack of fitness to lead.

In recent history, some observers have argued that the broad scope and usage of the procedure has given the Congress of Peru effective control over the executive branch by allowing the legislature to remove the president without cause. While it was only used four times before 2017, it has been invoked eight times since against four presidents: Pedro Pablo Kuczynski, Martin Vizcarra, Pedro Castillo, and Dina Boluarte. Kuczynski resigned before facing a vote on whether his office was vacant, while Vizcarra, Castillo, and Boluarte were all removed from office by Congress.

== Procedure ==
Under article 113 of the Constitution of Peru, the Congress of Peru may impeach the president of Peru via a declaration of permanent moral incapacity.

Until 2004, there was clearly established procedure for the application of article 113. The Constitutional Court of Peru established that the removal of the president should only be approved by a vote of at least two-thirds of Congress and urged Congress to legislate on the matter. In response, Congress passed Legislative Resolution No. 030-2003-CR, introducing article 89-A of the Regulations of Congress, which specifies the procedures for an impeachment and removal for permanent incapacity:

- To begin proceedings, a motion signed by at least one-fifth of Congress is made specifying the factual and legal grounds for a declaration of permanent moral incapacity. Documents that accredit the declaration, or, failing that, an indication of where said documents are located, must be provided. Once the motion is received by Congress, a copy of the same is sent to the president as soon as possible, and it takes precedence before any other pending motion on the agenda.
- To admit the motion for consideration, at least two-fifths of Congress must support it.
- If the motion is admitted, the Plenary sets the day and time for the debate and vote on the vacancy, which cannot be before the third day following the vote on admission or after the tenth day. However, four-fifths of Congress can vote to proceed immediately to a vote on vacancy.
- The president may personally exercise his right of defense or be assisted by a lawyer, for up to sixty minutes.
- The presidency may be declared vacant by a vote of at least two-thirds of Congress. Such vacancy is recorded in a Resolution of Congress, which is published in the official gazette within twenty-four hours or, failing that, a large national newspaper by order of the president.
- The resolution is effective from the moment the vacancy is communicated to the president of the Council of Ministers or published, whichever comes first.

== Usage ==
President	Date	Result	Details
José de la Riva Agüero	June 23, 1823	Vacancy	In June, 38 of 69 deputies met, and with 27 votes in favor, approved the "exemption of the supreme command." It was alleged that the defeats suffered in the fighting in recent months showed that Riva Agüero was not fit to lead the country.
Guillermo Billinghurst	February 4, 1914	Vacancy	From the end of 1913, Billinghurst planned the dissolution of Congress; in parallel, the parliamentarians declared his "moral incapacity" in a manifesto to the nation. However, a coup d'état removed Billinghurst from power, after which Congress formally declared the vacancy.
Alberto Fujimori	April 9, 1992	Declaration not recognized by the Armed Forces.	After the self-coup of April 5, 1992, on April 9, 1992, 99 deputies and 36 senators of the Congress unconstitutionally dissolved by Fujimori met at the home of the deputy from the Christian People's Party, Lourdes Flores Nano, and declared the permanent moral incapacity of Alberto Fujimori and with it the vacancy of the Presidency of the Republic.
Alberto Fujimori	November 21, 2000	Vacancy	On September 14, 2000, a video was released showing Vladimiro Montesinos bribing members of other parties to support Fujimori. Two days later, after the appearance of new videos, Alberto Fujimori called for parliamentary and presidential elections in which he would not participate. On November 19, Fujimori resigned via fax from Japan. However, on November 21, Congress rejected his resignation and removed him due to moral incapacity.
Pedro Pablo Kuczynski	December 21, 2017	Acquitted.	First impeachment process against Pedro Pablo Kuczynski
Pedro Pablo Kuczynski	March 22, 2018	Before voting on the vacancy, the president resigned.	Second impeachment of Pedro Pablo Kuczynski
Martin Vizcarra	September 18, 2020	Acquitted.	First impeachment of Martín Vizcarra
Martin Vizcarra	November 9, 2020	Vacancy	Second impeachment of Martín Vizcarra
Pedro Castillo	November 25, 2021	Motion to proceed failed.	Due to the appointment of dubious people and being involved in acts of corruption
Pedro Castillo	March 8, 2022	Acquitted.	Due to contradictions and alleged lies in court investigations, such as the alleged irregular promotions in the Armed Forces and the award of the Puente Tarata project to a company linked to the lobbyist Karelim López
Pedro Castillo	December 7, 2022	Vacancy	Third impeachment of Pedro Castillo
Dina Boluarte	October 10, 2025	Vacancy	Impeachment of Dina Boluarte
