= First impeachment =

First impeachment may refer to:

- First impeachment of Donald Trump
- First impeachment process against Martín Vizcarra
- First impeachment process against Pedro Pablo Kuczynski
- First impeachment of Yoon Suk Yeol
- First impeachment of Sara Duterte
