= List of presidents who did not win re-election =

This is a list of incumbent presidents as heads of state and/or heads of state and government in any country who ran for another term in office but were not re-elected.

== List ==
Term in office	President	Country	Lost election	Winning successor	Notes
1797–1801	John Adams	United States	1800 United States presidential election	Thomas Jefferson	Adams placed third behind Jefferson and his running mate Aaron Burr. Jefferson narrowly won a contingent election in the U.S. House of Representatives.
1825–1829	John Quincy Adams	United States	1828 United States presidential election	Andrew Jackson	Jackson previously won a plurality of the popular vote against Adams in the 1824 presidential election but lost a contingent election.
1837–1841	Martin Van Buren	United States	1840 United States presidential election	William Henry Harrison	Van Buren also ran in the 1848 presidential election with the Free Soil Party.
1871–1873	Miguel García Granados	Guatemala	1873 Guatemalan general election	Justo Rufino Barrios	García Granados was serving as acting president of Guatemala, however, he was defeated by Justo Rufino Barrios.
1885–1889	Grover Cleveland	United States	1888 United States presidential election	Benjamin Harrison	Cleveland and his running mate Allen G. Thurman lost by the Electoral College vote, but Cleveland himself won the 1892 presidential election, becoming the first U.S. President to serve non-consecutive terms.
1889–1893	Benjamin Harrison	United States	1892 United States presidential election	Grover Cleveland	A rematch of the presidential election four years earlier.
1909–1913	William Howard Taft	United States	1912 United States presidential election	Woodrow Wilson	Taft also ran against former President Theodore Roosevelt for the Republican nomination. After Taft won Roosevelt launched his own presidential campaign under the Progressive Party. Taft came in third behind both Wilson and Roosevelt.
1929–1933	Herbert Hoover	United States	1932 United States presidential election	Franklin D. Roosevelt	
1931–1937	Pehr Evind Svinhufvud	Finland	1937 Finnish presidential election	Kyösti Kallio	
1944–1946	Sergio Osmeña	Philippines	1946 Philippine presidential election	Manuel Roxas	Then-Vice President Osmeña succeeded Manuel L. Quezon after the latter died on 1944. Osmeña lost his own right term to Manuel Roxas on 1946 Philippine presidential election.
1948–1953	Elpidio Quirino	Philippines	1953 Philippine presidential election	Ramon Magsaysay	Then-Vice President Quirino succeeded Manuel Roxas on 1948. Quirino won his own right on 1949 presidential election.
1948–1955	Luigi Einaudi	Italy	1955 Italian presidential election	Giovanni Gronchi	
1938–1950	İsmet İnönü	Turkey	1950 Turkish presidential election	Celal Bayar	
1955–1962	Giovanni Gronchi	Italy	1962 Italian presidential election	Antonio Segni	
1957–1961	Carlos P. Garcia	Philippines	1961 Philippine presidential election	Diosdado Macapagal	Then-Vice President Garcia succeeded Ramon Magsaysay after the latter died in 1957. Garcia became president on his own right after winning the 1957 presidential election.
1960–1967	Aden Abdullah Osman Daar	Somalia	1967 Somali presidential election	Abdirashid Shermarke	
1961–1965	Diosdado Macapagal	Philippines	1965 Philippine presidential election	Ferdinand Marcos	
1964–1971	Giuseppe Saragat	Italy	1971 Italian presidential election	Giovanni Leone	
1974–1977	Gerald Ford	United States	1976 United States presidential election	Jimmy Carter	Former Georgia governor Jimmy Carter and Minnesota senator Walter Mondale narrowly defeated the Republican ticket of incumbent president Gerald Ford and Kansas senator Bob Dole.
1977–1981	Jimmy Carter	United States	1980 United States presidential election	Ronald Reagan	Carter was the first elected president to lose a re-election bid since Herbert Hoover in 1932.
1974–1981	Valéry Giscard d'Estaing	France	1981 French presidential election	François Mitterrand	A rematch of the presidential election seven years earlier.
1965–1986	Ferdinand Marcos	Philippines	1986 Philippine presidential election	Corazon Aquino	The final results of the election were disputed, Marcos initially led in the polls by COMELEC to the belief that the polls were tampered and considered an electoral fraud. These events eventually lead to the People Power Revolution.
1977–1988	Spyros Kyprianou	Cyprus	1988 Cypriot presidential election	George Vassiliou	Then President of the House of Representatives succeeded Archbishop Makarios III after his death in 1977. Kyprianou became president on his own right after winning the 1977 presidential by-election unopposed. He lost re-election in the first round of voting in the 1988 Cypriot presidential election, placing third.
1985–1990	Daniel Ortega	Nicaragua	1990 Nicaraguan general election	Violeta Chamorro	Ortega later returned to power in the 2006 elections.
1972–1991	Mathieu Kérékou	Benin	1991 Beninese presidential election	Nicéphore Soglo	
1980–1991	Aristides Pereira	Cape Verde	1991 Cape Verdean presidential election	António Mascarenhas Monteiro	
1964–1991	Kenneth Kaunda	Zambia	1991 Zambian general election	Frederick Chiluba	
1977–1992	Denis Sassou-Nguesso	Congo	1992 Republic of the Congo presidential election	Pascal Lissouba	
1989–1993	George H. W. Bush	United States	1992 United States presidential election	Bill Clinton	Some speculated that Ross Perot, the unsuccessful third candidate in the presidential race, cost incumbent President Bush the election. Arkansas governor Clinton and Tennessee senator Al Gore defeated the Republican ticket of Bush and incumbent Vice President Dan Quayle.
1989–1992	Václav Havel	Czechoslovakia	1992 Czechoslovak presidential election	none due to the Dissolution of Czechoslovakia	Havel later elected President of the Czech Republic.
1975–1993	Didier Ratsiraka	Madagascar	1992–93 Malagasy presidential election	Albert Zafy	Ratsiraka returned to power in 1996.
1988–1993	George Vassiliou	Cyprus	1993 Cypriot presidential election	Glafcos Clerides	
1981–1993	André Kolingba	Central African Republic	1993 Central African general election	Ange-Félix Patassé	
1966–1994	Hastings Banda	Malawi	1994 Malawian general election	Bakili Muluzi	
1991–1994	Leonid Kravchuk	Ukraine	1994 Ukrainian presidential election	Leonid Kuchma	
1990–1995	Lech Wałęsa	Poland	1995 Polish presidential election	Aleksander Kwaśniewski	Walesa also lost 2000 election.
1989–1996	Ion Iliescu	Romania	1996 Romanian general election	Emil Constantinescu	Iliescu returned to power in the 2000 election. Constantinescu did not run for reelection.
1991–1996	Nicéphore Soglo	Benin	1996 Beninese presidential election	Mathieu Kérékou	
1993–1996	Albert Zafy	Madagascar	1996 Malagasy presidential election	Didier Ratsiraka	
1990–1997	Mircea Snegur	Moldova	1996 Moldovan presidential election	Petru Lucinschi	
1990–1997	Punsalmaagiin Ochirbat	Mongolia	1997 Mongolian presidential election	Natsagiin Bagabandi	
1981–2000	Abdou Diouf	Senegal	2000 Senegalese presidential election	Abdoulaye Wade	
1996–2001	Didier Ratsiraka	Madagascar	2001 Malagasy presidential election	Marc Ravalomanana	
1996–2001	Petar Stoyanov	Bulgaria	2001 Bulgarian presidential election	Georgi Parvanov	
1996–2001	Lyudvig Chibirov	South Ossetia	2001 South Ossetian presidential election	Eduard Kokoity	The President of South Ossetia is only recognized as an independent head of state by some states.
1998–2003	Valdas Adamkus	Lithuania	2002–2003 Lithuanian presidential election	Rolandas Paksas	Returned to the office in 2004.
1993–2003	Glafcos Clerides	Cyprus	2003 Cypriot presidential election	Tassos Papadopoulos	Lost reelection in the first round of voting.
2000–2004	Hipólito Mejía	Dominican Republic	2004 Dominican Republic presidential election	Leonel Fernández	
2001–2004	Megawati Sukarnoputri	Indonesia	2004 Indonesian presidential election	Susilo Bambang Yudhoyono	Megawati was vice president elected by indirect votes from the Indonesian House of Representatives. She then became President after her predecessor Abdurrahman Wahid was impeached and removed from the office. In the Presidential Election, she sought election on a full term in the first direct presidential elections but lost to her former minister Susilo Bambang Yudhoyono.
1999–2004	Rudolf Schuster	Slovakia	2004 Slovak presidential election	Ivan Gašparovič	
2001–2006	Arnold Rüütel	Estonia	2006 Estonian presidential election	Toomas Hendrik Ilves	
2003–2008	Tassos Papadopoulos	Cyprus	2008 Cypriot presidential election	Demetris Christofias	Lost reelection in the first round of voting where he placed third.
1978–2008	Maumoon Abdul Gayoom	Maldives	2008 Maldivian presidential election	Mohamed Nasheed	
2005–2009	Nambaryn Enkhbayar	Mongolia	2009 Mongolian presidential election	Tsakhiagiin Elbegdorj	
2002–2010	Dahir Riyale Kahin	Somaliland	2010 Somaliland presidential election	Ahmed Mohamed Silanyo	The President of Somaliland is not diplomatically recognized as an independent head of state by the international community.
2005–2010	Viktor Yushchenko	Ukraine	2010 Ukrainian presidential election	Viktor Yanukovich	
2000–2011	Laurent Gbagbo	Ivory Coast	2010 Ivorian presidential election	Alassane Ouattara	Gbagbo declared President by Constitutional Council despite recognition of Outtara by the international community, leading to the Second Ivorian Civil War
1991–2011	Igor Smirnov	Transnistria	2011 Transnistrian presidential election	Yevgeny Shevchuk	The President of Transnistria is not recognized as an independent head of state by the international community.
2007–2011	Valdis Zatlers	Latvia	2011 Latvian presidential election	Andris Bērziņš	
2007–2012	José Ramos-Horta	East Timor	2012 East Timorese presidential election	Taur Matan Ruak	Ramos-Horta later won the 2022 presidential election
2008–2011	Rupiah Banda	Zambia	2011 Zambian general election	Michael Sata	
2007–2012	Nicolas Sarkozy	France	2012 French presidential election	François Hollande	Also ran in 2017 but lost The Republicans primary.
2000–2012	Abdoulaye Wade	Senegal	2012 Senegalese presidential election	Macky Sall	
2004–2012	Boris Tadić	Serbia	2012 Serbian presidential election	Tomislav Nikolić	
2005–2015	Mahinda Rajapaksa	Sri Lanka	2015 Sri Lankan presidential election	Maithripala Sirisena	Failed after running for an unprecedented third term after a constitutional amendment. Returned as Prime Minister of Sri Lanka in 2019 after his brother Gotabaya Rajapaksa was elected president.
2007–2012	Danilo Türk	Slovenia	2012 Slovenian presidential election	Borut Pahor	
2012–2014	Joyce Banda	Malawi	2014 Malawian general election	Peter Mutharika	
2010–2015	Ivo Josipović	Croatia	2014–2015 Croatian presidential election	Kolinda Grabar-Kitarović	
2010–2015	Goodluck Jonathan	Nigeria	2015 Nigerian presidential election	Muhammadu Buhari	
2010–2015	Bronisław Komorowski	Poland	2015 Polish presidential election	Andrzej Duda	
1994–2017	Yahya Jammeh	The Gambia	2016 Gambian presidential election	Adama Barrow	Jammeh initially refused to step down, causing the 2016–2017 Gambian constitutional crisis and the ECOWAS military intervention in the Gambia.
2012–2017	John Mahama	Ghana	2016 Ghanaian general election	Nana Akufo-Addo	After later losing the 2020 election, Mahama would win the 2024 election and succeed Akufo-Addo.
2011–2016	Manuel Pinto da Costa	São Tomé and Príncipe	2016 São Toméan presidential election	Evaristo Carvalho	
2011–2016	Yevgeny Shevchuk	Transnistria	2016 Transnistrian presidential election	Vadim Krasnoselsky	The President of Transnistria is not recognized as an independent head of state by the international community.
2012–2017	Hassan Sheikh Mohamud	Somalia	2017 Somali presidential election	Mohamed Abdullahi Mohamed	Won the 2022 Somali presidential election.
2012–2017	Leonid Tibilov	South Ossetia	2017 South Ossetian presidential election	Anatoly Bibilov	The President of South Ossetia is only recognized as an independent head of state by some states.
2014–2018	Hery Rajaonarimampianina	Madagascar	2018 Malagasy presidential election	Andry Rajoelina	
2013–2018	Abdulla Yameen	Maldives	2018 Maldivian presidential election	Ibrahim Mohamed Solih	
2014–2019	Petro Poroshenko	Ukraine	2019 Ukrainian presidential election	Volodymyr Zelenskyy	
2015–2019	Mauricio Macri	Argentina	2019 Argentine presidential election	Alberto Fernández	
2014–2020	José Mário Vaz	Guinea-Bissau	2019 Guinea-Bissau presidential election	Umaro Sissoco Embaló	
2015–2020	Kolinda Grabar-Kitarović	Croatia	2019–2020 Croatian presidential election	Zoran Milanović	
2014–2020	Peter Mutharika	Malawi	2020 Malawian presidential election	Lazarus Chakwera	A re-run of the previous year's election, which had been won by Mutharika but overturned by a court due to irregularities. Mutharika would later go on to defeat Chakwera in re-match at the 2025 election.
2017–2021	Donald Trump	United States	2020 United States presidential election	Joe Biden	Trump refused to concede shortly after he lost to former Vice President Biden and his running mate, California senator Kamala Harris, alleging fraud and filing and ultimately losing post-election lawsuits before 86 judges. The counting of the Electoral College votes by Congress on January 6, 2021, was briefly stopped when rioters stormed the Capitol building. Biden's victory was confirmed when Congress reconvened hours later. Trump and Biden were initially presumptive nominees in the 2024 presidential election until Biden withdrew, Trump subsequently won the 2024 presidential election and is ineligible to run for another term due to the term limits set by the Twenty-second Amendment.
2016–2020	Igor Dodon	Moldova	2020 Moldovan presidential election	Maia Sandu	Dodon alleged multiple voting irregularities including the prevention of Transnistrians from voting and interference from foreign leaders but congratulated Sandu as a precaution. Sandu became the first female president of the country.
2015–2021	Edgar Lungu	Zambia	2021 Zambian general election	Hakainde Hichilema	
2017–2022	Francisco Guterres	East Timor	2022 East Timorese presidential election	José Ramos-Horta	
2017–2022	Anatoly Bibilov	South Ossetia	2022 South Ossetian presidential election	Alan Gagloev	The President of South Ossetia is only recognized as an independent head of state by some states.
2017–2022	Mohamed Abdullahi Mohamed	Somalia	2022 Somali presidential election	Hassan Sheikh Mohamud	
2019–2022	Jair Bolsonaro	Brazil	2022 Brazilian general election	Luiz Inácio Lula da Silva	Bolsonaro ran against former president Luiz Inácio Lula da Silva. Lula won the election along with his running mate Geraldo Alckmin narrowly defeated Bolsonaro and his running mate Walter Braga Netto. Four years later in the following election, Lula ran against Bolsonaro's son Flávio Bolsonaro, who led in the first round of voting but Lula won on his fourth overall presidential term.
2018–2022	Barham Salih	Iraq	2022 Iraqi presidential election	Abdul Latif Rashid	
2018–2023	Ibrahim Mohamed Solih	Maldives	2023 Maldivian presidential election	Mohamed Muizzu	
2018–2024	George Weah	Liberia	2023 Liberian general election	Joseph Boakai	
2019–2024	Stevo Pendarovski	North Macedonia	2024 North Macedonian presidential election	Gordana Siljanovska-Davkova	
2022–2024	Ranil Wickremesinghe	Sri Lanka	2024 Sri Lankan presidential election	Anura Kumara Dissanayake	
2019–2024	Mokgweetsi Masisi	Botswana	2024 Botswana general election	Duma Boko	
2017–2024	Muse Bihi Abdi	Somaliland	2024 Somaliland presidential election	Abdirahman Mohamed Abdullahi	The President of Somaliland is not diplomatically recognized as an independent head of state by the international community.
2020–2025	Lazarus Chakwera	Malawi	2025 Malawian general election	Peter Mutharika	Mutharaika previously served as president from 2014 until his defeat by Chakwera in 2020.
2017–2024	Muse Bihi Abdi	Somaliland	2024 Somaliland presidential election	Abdirahman Mohamed Abdullahi	The President of Somaliland is not diplomatically recognized as an independent head of state by the international community.
2020–2025	Umaro Sissoco Embaló	Guinea-Bissau	2025 Guinea-Bissau general election	~~Fernando Dias~~	Days after the presidential election, the 2025 Guinea-Bissau coup d'état took place, annulling the results but also removing Embaló.

== See also ==
- List of impeachments of heads of state
- List of prime ministers defeated by votes of no confidence
- List of presidents of the United States who lost reelection
