= Second impeachment =

Second impeachment may refer to:

- Second impeachment of Donald Trump
- Second impeachment of Martín Vizcarra
- Second impeachment of Pedro Pablo Kuczynski
- Second impeachment of Yoon Suk Yeol
- Second impeachment of Sara Duterte
