= Barbadillo Prison =

Presidential prison in Lima, Peru

Coordinates: 12°02′34.3″S 76°54′48.8″W

- Interactive map of Barbadillo Prison
- Location: Lima, Peru
- Status: Active
- Capacity: 2 (adaptable for 3/4)
- Population: 4 (2025)

Barbadillo Prison (Spanish: Penal de Barbadillo) is a prison facility located in Lima, Peru, administered by the National Penitentiary Institute. Known as the "presidential prison" for being the place of detention of former presidents, it holds Alejandro Toledo, Pedro Castillo, Ollanta Humala, and Martin Vizcarra, and it previously hosted Alberto Fujimori.

== History ==
Barbadillo Prison, formerly a police headquarters, was converted after Alberto Fujimori's extradition from Chile to Peru in 2007, being originally conceived as a temporary space whilst a permanent establishment would be built for him. However, it was decided that he would remain onsite during the government of Alan García, while awaiting trial. In 2019, it was determined that Fujimori would remain in Barbadillo Prison after the Peruvian Supreme Court annulled a pardon granted to him on 3 October 2018.

== Location ==
The prison is located on the grounds of a police academy for the Directorate of Special Operations (Diroes), in Ate District, Lima.

== Features ==
Barbadillo Prison officially has a capacity of two but can be adapted to fit three or four.

According to the National Penitentiary Institute, Fujimori's former cell was equipped with a bedroom, bathroom, study, and access to a patio, where he tended a garden. In 2023, the signing of an inter-agency cooperation agreement was announced, in order to have a courtroom and video-conferencing facilities for the conduct of judicial proceedings for the former presidents.

== Prisoners ==
=== Current ===
The prison hosts the former Peruvian presidents Alejandro Toledo, Pedro Castillo, Ollanta Humala, and Martín Vizcarra.

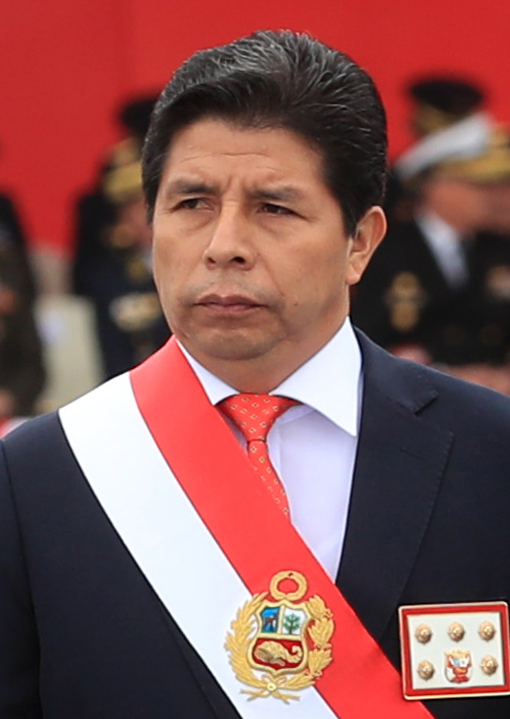
Pedro Castillo (president 2021–2022, imprisoned since December 2022)

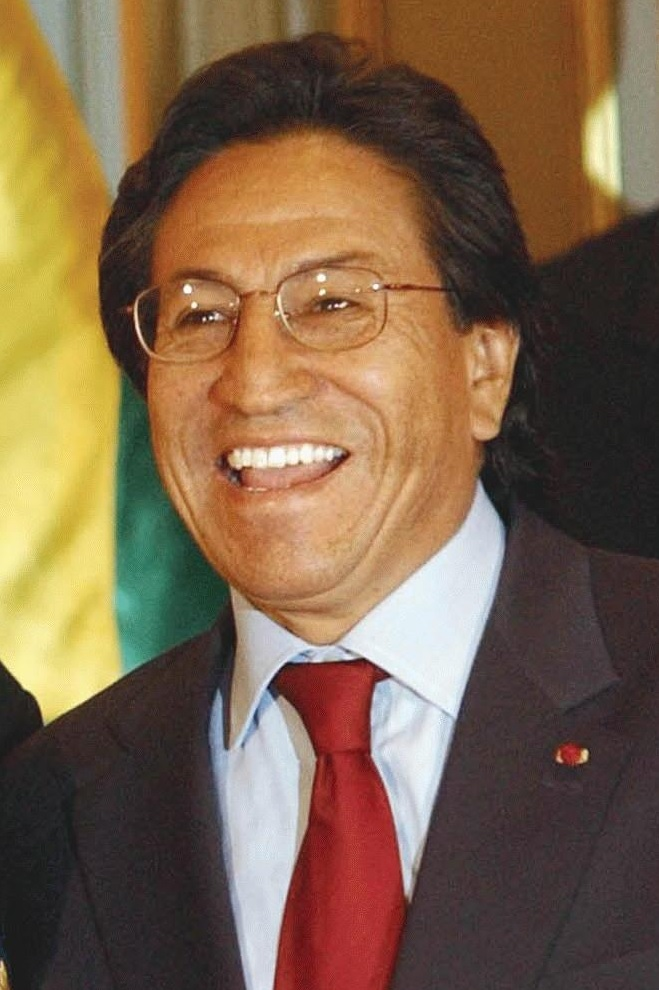
Alejandro Toledo (president 2001–2006, imprisoned since April 2023)

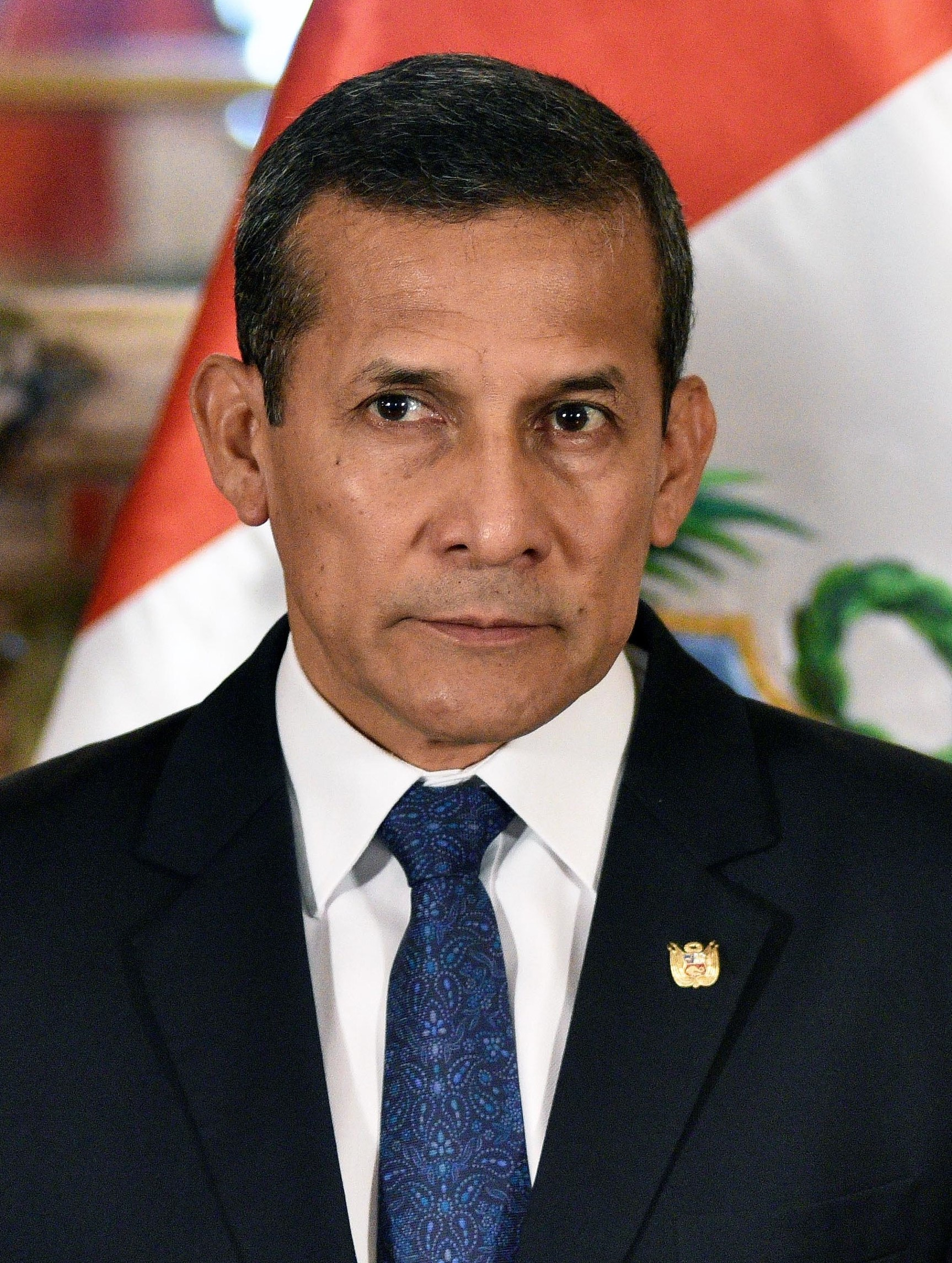
Ollanta Humala (president 2011–2016, imprisoned 2017–2018 and since April 2025)

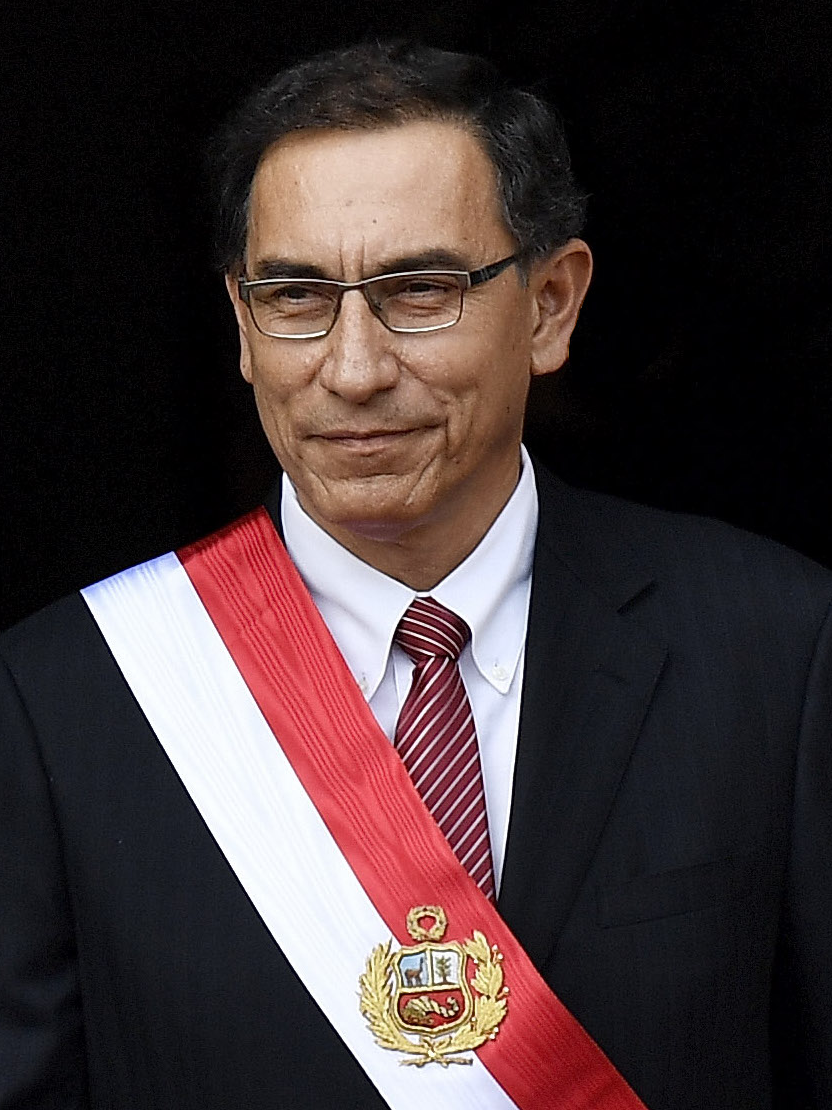
Martín Vizcarra (president 2018–2020, 2025, and since November 2025)

=== Former ===
It previously hosted Alberto Fujimori, from 2007 to 2023 (excluding a brief period in 2017, when he was released).

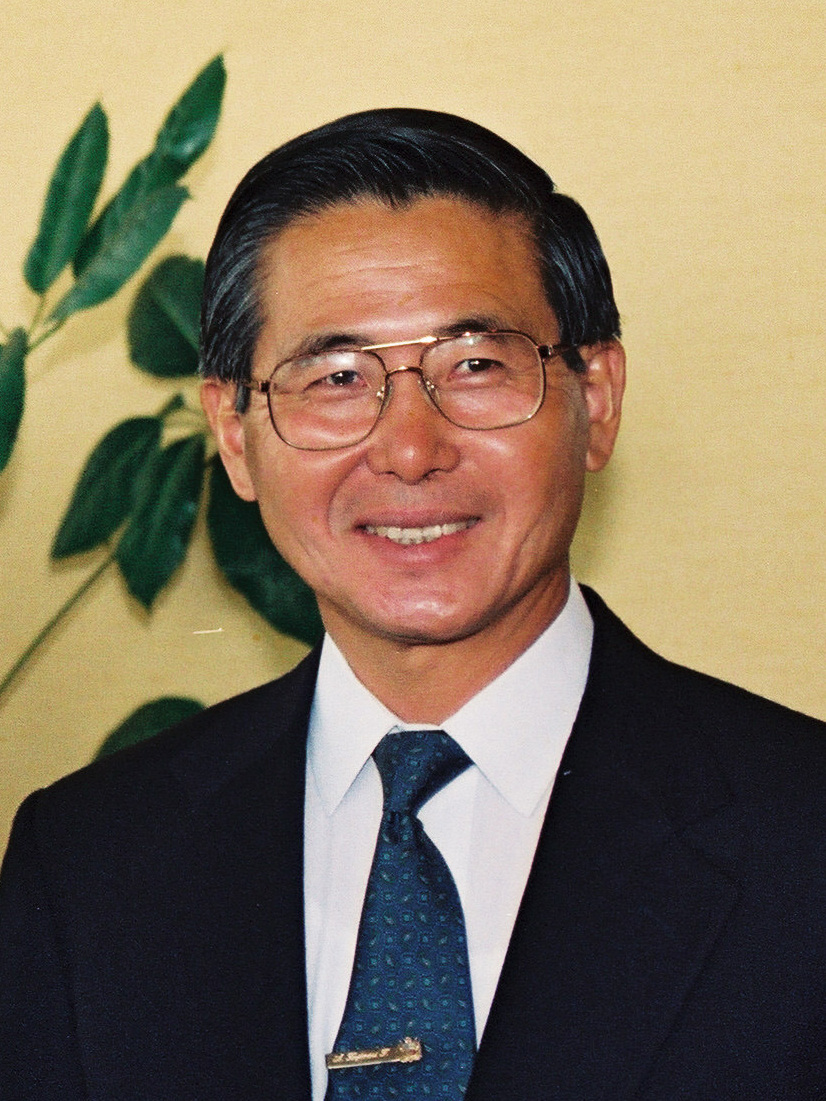
Alberto Fujimori (president 1990–2000, imprisoned 2007–2023)
