= Alfredo Benavides Diez-Canseco =

Peruvian diplomat

Minister of Navy and Aviation
- In office December 8, 1931 – May 2, 1933
- President: Luis Miguel Sánchez Cerro
- Preceded by: Federico Díaz Dulanto
- Succeeded by: Luis A. Flores

Minister Plenipotentiary of Peru to the United Kingdom
- In office 1933–1942
- President: Óscar R. Benavides
- Preceded by: Óscar R. Benavides

Ambassador of Peru to Canada
- In office 1944–1949
- President: Position established

Personal details
- Born: March 30, 1881 Lima, Peru
- Died: 1967 Lima, Peru
- Education: Colegio de la Inmaculada; Guadalupe College
- Occupation: Athlete, diplomat

Alfredo Benavides Diez-Canseco (Lima; March 30, 1881 — 1967) was a Peruvian diplomat and sportsman. He was the president of the first sports institution in Peru, and of the Lima Jockey Club (inaugurating the Santa Beatriz Hippodrome under his tenure), and one of the founders of the Club Terrazas in Miraflores.

== Biography ==
He was born in 1881 to parents Alfredo Benavides and María Diez Canseco. He studied at the Jesuit School and the College of Our Lady of Guadalupe, beginning his diplomatic career in 1905 as part of the Legation in the United States. In 1907, he was transferred to the Consulate in Antwerp where he served as Chancellor, and later to the Consulate in Le Havre, being promoted to Consul in 1909. He was moved to Bourdeaux the same year and to Bremen in 1911. In 1913 he was appointed provisional Chief of the Consular Division of the Foreign Ministry. He also served as representative of Peru to the United Kingdom and the first ambassador of Peru to Canada. He was a brother-in-law of his distant cousin, Óscar R. Benavides.

He later served as head of various sports institutions, such as the Lima Jockey Club, and the Club Terrazas in Miraflores.

== See also ==
- Hipódromo de Santa Beatriz
