= List of ambassadors of Peru to Canada =

Ambassador of Peru to Canada
- Great Seal of Peru
- Ministry of Foreign Affairs; 130 Albert Street, Suite 1901, Ottawa
- Appointer: The president of Peru
- Inaugural holder: Alfredo Benavides Diez-Canseco
- Formation: 1944
- Website: Embassy of Peru in Canada

The ambassador extraordinary and plenipotentiary of Peru in Canada is the head of the diplomatic mission of Peru to Canada.

Both countries established relations in 1944.

== List of ambassadors of Peru to Canada ==
Name	Period	Title	Presented credentials	Ref
Luis Alvarado G.	1944–1945	Charge d'Affaires a.i.	December 1944	
Alfredo Benavides Diez Canseco	1945–1949	Ambassador	29 March 1945	
Manuel Cacho Sousa	1949–1950	Ambassador	12 September 1949	
Cesar A. de la Fuente	1950	Charge d'Affaires a.i.	26 February 1950	
Luis Cuneo-Harrison	1950–1952	Ambassador	11 September 1950	
German Fernandez-Concha	1952–1956	Ambassador	27 March 1952	
Jose V. Larrabure	1956–1961	Ambassador	23 February 1956	
Fortunato E. Quesada	1961–1962	Charge d'Affaires a.i.	June 1961	
Max de La Fuente	1962–1964	Ambassador	6 September 1962	
Victor Proaño	1964–1967	Ambassador	4 August 1964	
Arturo Garcia	1967–1968	Ambassador	9 August 1967	
César A. De La Fuente Locker	1968–1973	Ambassador	3 July 1968	
General Victor Odicio Tamariz	1973–1974	Ambassador	19 September 1973	
Alejandro Deustua Arrospide	1974–1977	Ambassador	17 May 1974	
Eduardo Valdez	1977–1980	Ambassador	18 May 1977	
Victor Fernandez-Davilla	1980–1981	Charge d'affaires a.i.	12 September 1980	
Jorge Pablo Fernandini	1981–1985	Ambassador	22 July 1981	
Óscar Maúrtua de Romaña	1985–1988	Ambassador	20 March 1985	
Jorge Gordillo	1988–1993	Ambassador	5 December 1988	
Hernán Couturier	1994–2000	Ambassador	20 October 1994	
José Emilio Romero Cevallos	2000–2005	Ambassador	8 May 2000	
Guillermo José Miguel Russo Checa	2005–2008	Ambassador	20 September 2005	
Jorge Juan Castañeda Méndez	2008–2010	Ambassador	17 June 2008	
José Antonio Raymundo Bellina Acevedo	2010–2015	Ambassador	28 April 2010	
Doraliza Marcela Lopez Bravo	2015–2017	Ambassador	14 December 2015	
Martín Alberto Vizcarra Cornejo	2017–2018	Ambassador	23 October 2017	
Roberto Rafael Max Rodríguez Arnillas	2018–2023	Ambassador	29 June 2018	
Manuel Gerardo Talavera Espinar	2023–2026	Ambassador	25 September 2023	
