= List of prime ministers defeated by votes of no confidence =

This is a list of prime ministers defeated by either a parliamentary motion of no confidence or by the similar process of loss of supply.

== Prime ministers defeated by votes of no confidence ==
=== Australia ===
Only one Australian prime minister, Malcolm Fraser, has ever been defeated in the House of Representatives by an explicit motion of no confidence. In addition, six prime ministers were unable to enact important policy and therefore resigned, two prime ministers were unable to obtain supply from the House of Representatives, one prime minister was unable to obtain supply in the Senate and was dismissed by the Governor General, one prime minister never had the confidence of the House of Representatives, lost a motion of no confidence and refused to resign.

These prime ministers were able to gain supply from the House of Representatives, but were unable to pass important policy-related legislation:

- Chris Watson (1904, Conciliation and Arbitration Bill)
- George Reid (1905, amendment on the address-in-reply)
- Alfred Deakin (1908, motion to change the time of the next meeting of parliament)
- Andrew Fisher (1909, a motion to adjourn debate)
- Stanley Bruce (1929, major bill defeated)
- James Scullin (1931, a motion to adjourn debate)

These prime ministers could not gain supply from the House of Representatives or an opposition amendment to a supply bill was passed:

- Alfred Deakin (1904, could pass no legislation)
- Arthur Fadden (1941, budget was amended down by £A1)
- Malcolm Fraser (1975, could pass no legislation and lost a no confidence motion by the House of Representatives which also called on the Governor-General to recommission a government under Gough Whitlam as prime minister)

Gough Whitlam could not gain supply from the Senate which was controlled by the conservative Coalition. It thus precipitated the 1975 constitutional crisis and Whitlam was dismissed.

Following Whitlam's dismissal, Malcolm Fraser was appointed prime minister. He never had the confidence of the House of Representatives, and he lost a motion of no confidence by 10 votes in the House of Representatives two hours after the dismissal of Whitlam. However, the Governor-General refused to see the Speaker of the House of Representatives who was to convey this motion of no confidence to him, or to acknowledge the motion of no confidence of the House of Representatives which had also called on the Governor-General to recommission the government led by Gough Whitlam. One hour later the Governor-General dissolved parliament with Fraser still in office.

=== Austria ===
- Sebastian Kurz (2019)

=== Barbados ===
- Lloyd Erskine Sandiford (1994)

=== Belgium ===
- Aloys Van de Vyvere (1925)
- Paul-Henri Spaak (1946) (vote tied 90-90)

=== British Virgin Islands ===
- Andrew Fahie (2022) (Premier)

=== Bulgaria ===
- Philip Dimitrov (1992) – lost a vote of confidence
- Kiril Petkov (2022)

=== Canada ===
- William Lyon Mackenzie King (1925) – lost a budget vote
- Arthur Meighen (1926) – lost a vote of confidence on appointing temporary ministers
- John Diefenbaker (1963) – loss of confidence supply as a result of cabinet revolt
- Pierre Trudeau (1974) – loss of confidence supply (Note: Trudeau lost a motion of confidence when he failed to pass the 1974 budget. However, it was later revealed that this was done purposely by Prime Minister Trudeau in a successful attempt to win a majority government. This is the only time the tactic has been used in federal Canadian politics, but it established a precedent. Such a tactic is now called "engineering the defeat of one's own government", and it is widely frowned upon)
- Joe Clark (1979) – lost a budget vote
- Paul Martin (2005) – opposition triggered motion (Note: While Meighen, Diefenbaker and Trudeau were toppled by loss of supply, and Joe Clark was defeated by the passage of a subamendment to a budget bill that read "that this House has lost confidence in the government," Martin and Harper lost an actual motion of no confidence put forward by the opposition parties.)
- Stephen Harper (2011) – motion of no confidence that held the government in contempt of Parliament. Though the motion passed, Harper won a majority the following election.

=== Cook Islands ===
- Terepai Maoate (2002)

=== Croatia ===
- Tihomir Orešković (2016) – lost a vote of no confidence triggered by ruling party after he called for his vice-PM (ruling party president)'s resignation due to conflict of interest

=== Czech Republic ===
- Mirek Topolánek (2006)
- Mirek Topolánek (2009)
- Jiří Rusnok (2013)
- Andrej Babiš (2018)

=== Denmark ===
- Knud Kristensen (1947)

=== Estonia ===
- Mart Laar 1st (1994) (after breaching a contract with Russia by selling stock Russian rubles to secessionist Chechen Republic of Ichkeria)
- Taavi Rõivas (2016) (after not leaving office when having lost parliamentary majority by coalition members leaving)

=== Finland ===
- V. J. Sukselainen (1957)
- Rainer von Fieandt (1958)

=== France ===
- Félix Gaillard (1958) – lost a vote of confidence
- Georges Pompidou (1962) – stayed on, National Assembly dissolved
- Michel Barnier (2024)
- François Bayrou (2025) – lost a vote of confidence

=== Germany ===
- Wilhelm Cuno (1923)
- Gustav Stresemann (1923) – lost a vote of confidence
- Hans Luther (1926)
- Wilhelm Marx (1926)
- Franz von Papen (1932)
- Helmut Schmidt (1982)
- Helmut Kohl (1982) – lost a vote of confidence (orchestrated by the majority with the aim of triggering an early federal election)
- Gerhard Schröder (2005) – lost a vote of confidence (orchestrated by the majority with the aim of triggering an early federal election)
- Olaf Scholz (2024) – lost a vote of confidence (orchestrated by the majority with the aim of triggering an early federal election)

=== Hungary ===
- Ferenc Gyurcsány (2009) – (orchestrated by the majority with the aim of changing the prime minister without consent of the President László Sólyom)

=== Haiti ===
- Jacques-Édouard Alexis (2008)
- Michèle Pierre-Louis (2009)

=== India ===
- Morarji Desai (1979)
- V. P. Singh (1990)
- H. D. Deve Gowda (1997)
- Atal Bihari Vajpayee (1999)

=== Ireland ===
- Charles Haughey (1982)
- Albert Reynolds (1992)

=== Israel ===
- Yitzhak Shamir (1990)
- Benjamin Netanyahu (2021)

=== Italy ===
- Alfonso La Marmora 2nd (1865)
- Luigi Federico Menabrea 1st (1867)
- Giovanni Lanza (1873)
- Benedetto Cairoli 1st (1878)
- Agostino Depretis 3rd (1879)
- Francesco Crispi 2nd (1891)
- Antonio Di Rudinì 1st (1892)
- Antonio Di Rudinì 3rd (1896)
- Giuseppe Saracco (1901)
- Alessandro Fortis 1st (1905)
- Alessandro Fortis 2nd (1906)
- Sidney Sonnino 1st (1906)
- Paolo Boselli (1917)
- Vittorio Emanuele Orlando (1919)
- Luigi Facta (1922)
- Benito Mussolini (1943) (Note: The Grand Council of Fascism passed a resolution (the Ordine del Giorno Grandi) asking the king to resume his full constitutional powers, which amounted to a vote of no confidence in Mussolini.)
- Alcide De Gasperi 8th (1953)
- Amintore Fanfani 1st (1954)
- Giulio Andreotti 1st (1972)
- Giulio Andreotti 5th (1979)
- Amintore Fanfani 7th (1987)
- Romano Prodi 1st (1998)
- Romano Prodi 2nd (2008)

=== Japan ===
- Katsura Tarō 3rd (1913)
- Shigeru Yoshida 2nd (1948)
- Shigeru Yoshida 4th (1953)
- Masayoshi Ohira (1980)
- Kiichi Miyazawa (1993)

=== Kazakhstan ===
- Sergey Tereshchenko (1994)

=== Kosovo ===
- Hashim Thaçi (2010)
- Isa Mustafa (2017)
- Albin Kurti (2020)

=== Libya ===
- Ali Zeidan (2014)
- Abdul Hamid Dbeibeh (2021)

=== Lithuania ===
- Adolfas Šleževičius (1996)

=== Malta ===
- Alfred Sant (1998)
- Lawrence Gonzi (2012)

=== Marshall Islands ===
- Casten Nemra (2016)

=== Moldova ===
- Ion Sturza (1999)
- Valeriu Streleț (2015)
- Maia Sandu (2019)

=== Mongolia ===
- Tsakhiagiin Elbegdorj (1998)
- Luvsannamsrain Oyun-Erdene (2025) – lost a vote of confidence
- Gombojavyn Zandanshatar (2025) – lost a vote of confidence

=== Montenegro ===
- Zdravko Krivokapić (2022)
- Dritan Abazović (2022)

=== Nepal ===
- Sher Bahadur Deuba (1997)
- Lokendra Bahadur Chand (1997)
- KP Sharma Oli (2021)
- Pushpa Kamal Dahal (2024)

=== Netherlands ===
- Hendrikus Colijn (1939)
- Jo Cals (1966)

=== New Zealand ===
- Thomas MacKenzie (1912)

=== Niger ===
- Hama Amadou (2007)

=== Northern Cyprus ===
- İrsen Küçük (2013)

=== Norway ===
- Christopher Hornsrud (1928)
- Einar Gerhardsen (1963)
- John Lyng (1963)
- Kåre Willoch (1986) – lost a "cabinet question"
- Jan Peder Syse (1990)
- Kjell Magne Bondevik (2000) – lost a "cabinet question"

=== Pakistan ===
- Imran Khan (2022)

=== Papua New Guinea ===
- Michael Somare (1980)
- Paias Wingti (1988)
- Sam Abal (2011)

=== Peru ===
- Fernando Zavala (2017)

=== Poland ===
- Jan Olszewski (1992)
- Hanna Suchocka (1993)
- Waldemar Pawlak (1995) – (orchestrated by the majority with the aim of changing the prime minister without consent of the President Lech Wałęsa)
- Marek Belka (2004) – lost a vote of confidence
- Mateusz Morawiecki (2023) – lost a vote of confidence two weeks after being sworn in by President Andrzej Duda despite protests from the opposition

=== Portugal ===
- António Maria da Silva (1923)
- José Domingues dos Santos (1925)
- Mário Soares (1978, 1985)
- Francisco Pinto Balsemão (1983)
- Aníbal Cavaco Silva (1987)
- Passos Coelho (Parliament rejected government programme) (2015)
- Luís Montenegro (2025) – lost a vote of confidence

=== Romania ===
- Emil Boc (2009)
- Mihai Răzvan Ungureanu (2012)
- Sorin Grindeanu (2017)
- Viorica Dăncilă (2019)
- Ludovic Orban (2020)
- Florin Cîțu (2021)
- Ilie Bolojan (2026)

=== Samoa ===
- Fiamē Naomi Mataʻafa (2025, loss of supply)

=== Slovakia ===
- Vladimír Mečiar (1991, 1994)
- Iveta Radičová (2011)
- Eduard Heger (2022)
- Ľudovít Ódor (2023)

=== Slovenia ===
- Lojze Peterle (1992)
- Janez Drnovšek (2000)
- Borut Pahor (2011)
- Janez Janša (2013)

=== Solomon Islands ===
- Peter Kenilorea (1981)
- Francis Billy Hilly (1994)
- Manasseh Sogavare (2007, 2017)
- Jeremiah Manele (2026)

=== Somalia ===
- Ali Khalif Galaid (2001)
- Ali Muhammad Ghedi (2004)
- Abdi Farah Shirdon (2013)
- Abdiweli Sheikh Ahmed (2014)

=== Spain ===
- Raimundo Fernández-Villaverde (1905) – lost a vote of confidence
- Count of Romanones (1913) – lost a vote of confidence
- Mariano Rajoy (2018)

=== Sri Lanka ===
- Mahinda Rajapaksa (2018)

=== Sweden ===
- Ingvar Carlsson (1990)
- Stefan Löfven (2018)
- Stefan Löfven (2021)

=== Thailand ===
- Seni Pramoj (1975)

=== Turkey ===
- Kıbrıslı Mehmed Kâmil Pasha (1909)
- Sadi Irmak (1974)
- Bülent Ecevit (1977)
- Tansu Çiller (1995)
- Mesut Yılmaz (1996)

=== Tuvalu ===
- Kamuta Latasi (1996)
- Bikenibeu Paeniu (1999)
- Faimalaga Luka (2001)
- Saufatu Sopoanga (2004)
- Maatia Toafa (2010)
- Willy Telavi (2013)

=== Ukraine ===
- Valeriy Pustovoitenko (1999) – lost a vote of confidence
- Viktor Yushchenko (2001)
- Viktor Yanukovych (2004)
- Yulia Tymoshenko (2010)

=== United Kingdom ===
- Lord North (1782) (Note: This is considered to be the first motion of no confidence in history.)
- John Russell, 1st Earl Russell (1866)
- Benjamin Disraeli (1868)
- William Ewart Gladstone (1885)
- Robert Gascoyne-Cecil, 3rd Marquess of Salisbury (1886)
- William Ewart Gladstone (1886)
- Robert Gascoyne-Cecil, 3rd Marquess of Salisbury (1892)
- Archibald Primrose, 5th Earl of Rosebery (1895)
- Stanley Baldwin (January 1924)
- Ramsay MacDonald (October 1924)
- James Callaghan (1979)

=== Vanuatu ===
- Maxime Carlot Korman (1996)
- Barak Sopé (2001)
- Serge Vohor (2004)
- Edward Natapei (2010)
- Sato Kilman (2011)
- Moana Carcasses Kalosil (2014)
- Joe Natuman (2015)
- Ishmael Kalsakau (2023)
- Sato Kilman (2023)

=== Western Sahara ===
- Mahfoud Ali Beiba (1999)

=== Yugoslavia ===
- Radoje Kontić (1998)

== Other leaders defeated in no confidence votes ==
=== Presidents ===
These countries are generally parliamentary systems in which the president is elected by the parliament but is also head of state.

==== France ====
- Adolphe Thiers (1873)

==== French Polynesia ====
- Gaston Flosse (2005, 2008)
- Oscar Temaru (2006, 2009)
- Gaston Tong Sang (2007, 2011)

==== Guyana ====
- David A. Granger (2018)

==== Kiribati ====
- Teburoro Tito (2003)

==== Marshall Islands ====
- Litokwa Tomeing (2009)

==== Nauru ====
- Lagumot Harris (1996)
- Bernard Dowiyogo (1996, 2001)
- Kinza Clodumar (1998)
- Ludwig Scotty (2003, 2007)
- René Harris (2004)
- Freddie Pitcher (2011)
- Russ Kun (2023)

==== Peru ====
- José Jerí (2026)

== See also ==
- Motion of Confidence#Examples of defeats by Motions of Confidence
- Confidence and supply
- List of presidents who did not win reelection
