= List of presidents of the United States who lost reelection =

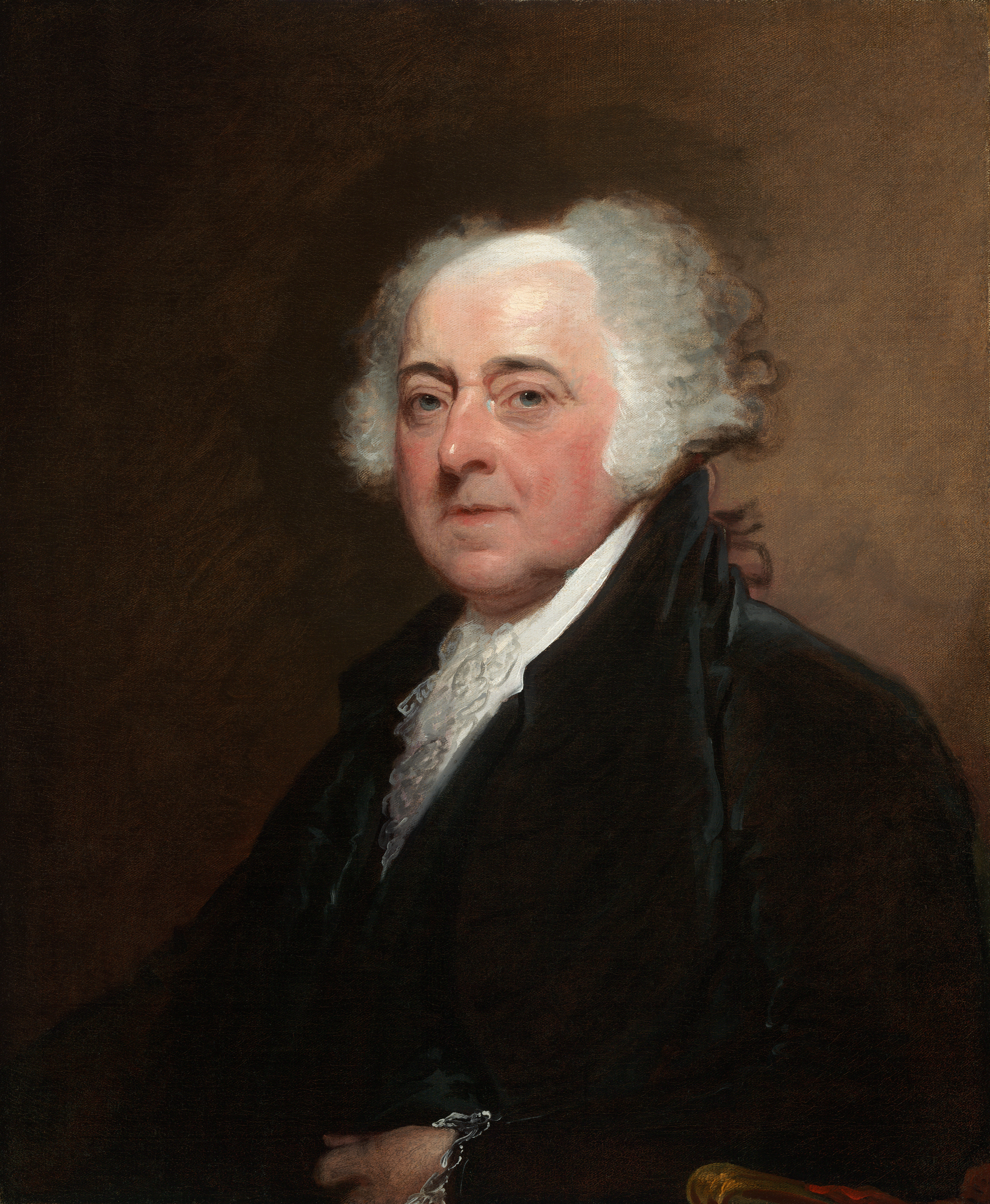
John Adams is the first president to have lost a re-election.

The president of the United States is the head of state and head of government of the United States, indirectly elected to a four-year term via the Electoral College. The president is eligible for re-election, but since 1951 under the 22nd Amendment to the Constitution of the United States cannot be re-elected twice (no person may serve more than two full terms as president or one term if they have served over two years of a partial term).

Gerald Ford is absent from this list as he was never elected, only confirmed by Congress as the replacing vice president for Richard Nixon.

== List ==
Term in office	President	Lost election	Winning successor	Notes
1797–1801	John Adams	1800 United States presidential election	Thomas Jefferson	Adams placed third behind Jefferson and his running mate Aaron Burr. Jefferson narrowly won a contingent election in the U.S. House of Representatives.
1825–1829	John Quincy Adams	1828 United States presidential election	Andrew Jackson	Jackson previously won a plurality of the popular vote against Adams in the 1824 presidential election but lost a contingent election.
1837–1841	Martin Van Buren	1840 United States presidential election	William Henry Harrison	Van Buren is the only president to have lost two re-elections.
1837–1841	Martin Van Buren	1848 United States presidential election	Zachary Taylor	Van Buren ran under the Free Soil Party. He's also the first president to run for a non-consecutive term.
1850–1853	Millard Fillmore	1856 United States presidential election	James Buchanan	Fillmore ran under both the Whig Party and the Know Nothing Party.
1853–1857	Franklin Pierce	1856 Democratic National Convention	James Buchanan	Pierce unsuccessfully tried to get the Democratic party nomination, and lost to James Buchanan, who went on to win the elections.
1865–1869	Andrew Johnson	1868 Democratic National Convention	Ulysses S. Grant	Johnson unsuccessfully tried to get the Democratic party nomination, and lost to Horatio Seymour, who lost the elections to Ulysses S. Grant.
1869–1877	Ulysses S. Grant	1880 Republican National Convention	James A. Garfield	Grant lost the 1880 nomination for the Republican party presidential ticket, he narrowly lost to James A. Garfield, who went on to win the elections.
1881–1885	Chester A. Arthur	1884 Republican National Convention	Grover Cleveland	While unlikely to win the nomination, Arthur nonetheless ran for the Republican Party nomination and lost it to James G. Blaine, who lost the elections to Grover Cleveland.
1885–1889 (Note: 1st term, was also president between 1893 to 1897)	Grover Cleveland	1888 United States presidential election	Benjamin Harrison	Cleveland lost the 1888 presidential election, but won the 1892 United States presidential election, becoming the first U.S. president to serve nonconsecutive terms.
1889–1893	Benjamin Harrison	1892 United States presidential election	Grover Cleveland	A rematch of the presidential election four years earlier.
1901–1909	Theodore Roosevelt	1912 United States presidential election	Woodrow Wilson	Roosevelt ran under the Progressive Party.
1909–1913	William Howard Taft	1912 United States presidential election	Woodrow Wilson	Taft ran against former President Theodore Roosevelt for the Republican nomination. After Taft won, Roosevelt launched his own presidential campaign under the Progressive Party. Taft came in third behind both Wilson and Roosevelt.
1929–1933	Herbert Hoover	1932 United States presidential election	Franklin D. Roosevelt	Hoover also hoped to get a nomination at both the 1936 and 1940 Republican National Concentions, but ultimately didn't get one.
1977–1981	Jimmy Carter	1980 United States presidential election	Ronald Reagan	Carter was the first elected president to lose a re-election bid since Herbert Hoover in 1932.
1989–1993	George H. W. Bush	1992 United States presidential election	Bill Clinton	Some speculated that Ross Perot, the unsuccessful third candidate in the presidential race, cost Bush the election.
2017–2021 (Note: 1st term, is also president since 2025)	Donald Trump	2020 United States presidential election	Joe Biden	Trump refused to concede, alleging fraud, but ultimately losing multiple post-election lawsuits before 86 judges. The counting of the Electoral College votes by Congress on January 6, 2021, was briefly stopped when rioters stormed the Capitol building. Joe Biden's victory was confirmed when Congress reconvened hours later. Trump and Biden were initially presumptive nominees in the 2024 United States presidential election until Biden withdrew. Trump subsequently won the 2024 presidential election and is ineligible to run for another term due to the Twenty-second Amendment.
