= First impeachment process against Pedro Pablo Kuczynski =

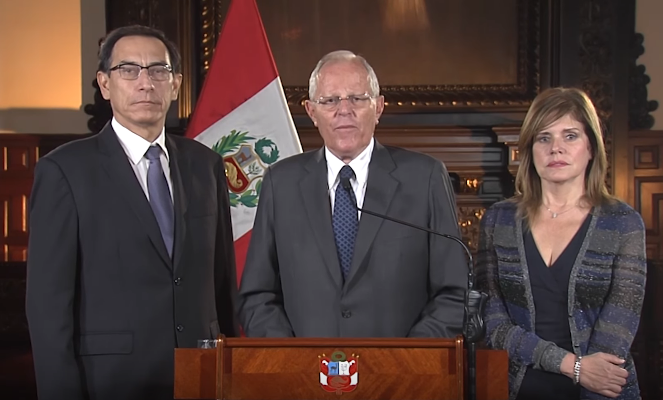
- Pedro Pablo Kuczynski, along with his vice presidents, Martín Vizcarra and Mercedes Aráoz, speaks about the impeachment process against him.
- Date: 15–21 December 2017
- Location: Peru
- Participants: Pedro Pablo Kuczynski and Congress of Peru
- Outcome: Failed

The first impeachment process against Pedro Pablo Kuczynski was initiated by the opposition-controlled Congress of Peru on 15 December 2017, during the broader political crisis. The impeachment was triggered by allegations that Kuczynski, who had been President of Peru since 2016, lied about receiving payments from the Brazilian construction company Odebrecht. The process moved rapidly, with congressional leaders predicting it could conclude within a week. However, on 21 December 2017, the motion was defeated in a congressional vote, failing to secure the two-thirds majority required for removal and allowing Kuczynski to remain in office.

== Background ==
Before the impeachment process began, President Kuczynski was accused by the congressional opposition of lying about payments from the Brazilian construction company Odebrecht. He had initially denied receiving any payments but later admitted that a firm he owned, Westfield Capital Ltd., had received them; he continued to deny any irregularities. Numerous other Latin American politicians had been implicated in the Odebrecht scandal, including Colombian president Juan Manuel Santos, Mexican president Enrique Peña Nieto, Venezuelan president Nicolás Maduro, and former Peruvian presidents Alan García, Alejandro Toledo, and Ollanta Humala. Others implicated were Keiko Fujimori—chairwoman of Popular Force, daughter of former president Alberto Fujimori, and Kuczynski's narrow opponent in the 2016 general election.

Upon initiating the proceedings, Congress President Luis Galarreta stated he expected Kuczynski to be removed from office ″within a week.″ Kuczynski's Peruvians for Change party held only 18 of the 130 seats in Congress. The opposition—including the right-wing Popular Force, chaired by Keiko Fujimori, and the left-wing Broad Front, headed by former priest and environmental activist Marco Arana—collectively commanded 81 seats. This was just short of the two-thirds congressional majority (87 seats) needed to remove a president.

According to Reuters, Kuczynski had also lost support within his own cabinet, with some members urging him to resign. On 14 December 2017, the congressional opposition gave him an ultimatum to resign by the end of the day or face impeachment. Kuczynski responded: "It cost us a lot to get our democracy back. We're not going to lose it again. I'm not going to give up my honour, nor my values, nor my responsibilities as president of all Peruvians."

== Vote in the Congress of the Republic ==
=== Partisan makeup of the Congress of the Republic (16 December 2017) ===
Party/Coalition	Seats	Position	Ideology
Popular Force	71	Opposition	Right-wing
Peruvians for Change	18	Government	Centre-right
Broad Front	10	Opposition	Left-wing
New Peru	10	Opposition	Left-wing
Alliance for Progress	9	Opposition	Centre-right
Popular Action	5	Supporting government	Centre/Centre-right
Peruvian Aprista Party	5	Opposition	Centre-left
Independents	2	Supporting government	-
Government total (with support)		25	
Opposition total		105	

Vote on removing President Pedro Pablo Kuczynski from office in the Congress of the Republic
Ballot	21 December 2017
Absentees	12 / 130
Required majority	87 out of 130 (two thirds of the legal number of congressmen)
Yes	78 / 130
No	19 / 130
Abstentions	21 / 130
Sources: Congress of the Republic

== See also ==
- Congress of Peru
- Impeachment trial
- List of impeachments of heads of state
- Alberto Fujimori
- Second impeachment and resignation of Pedro Pablo Kuczynski
- First impeachment process against Martín Vizcarra
- Removal of Martín Vizcarra
