= Martín Vizcarra =

President of Peru from 2018 to 2020

Martín Vizcarra OSP CYC GColIH
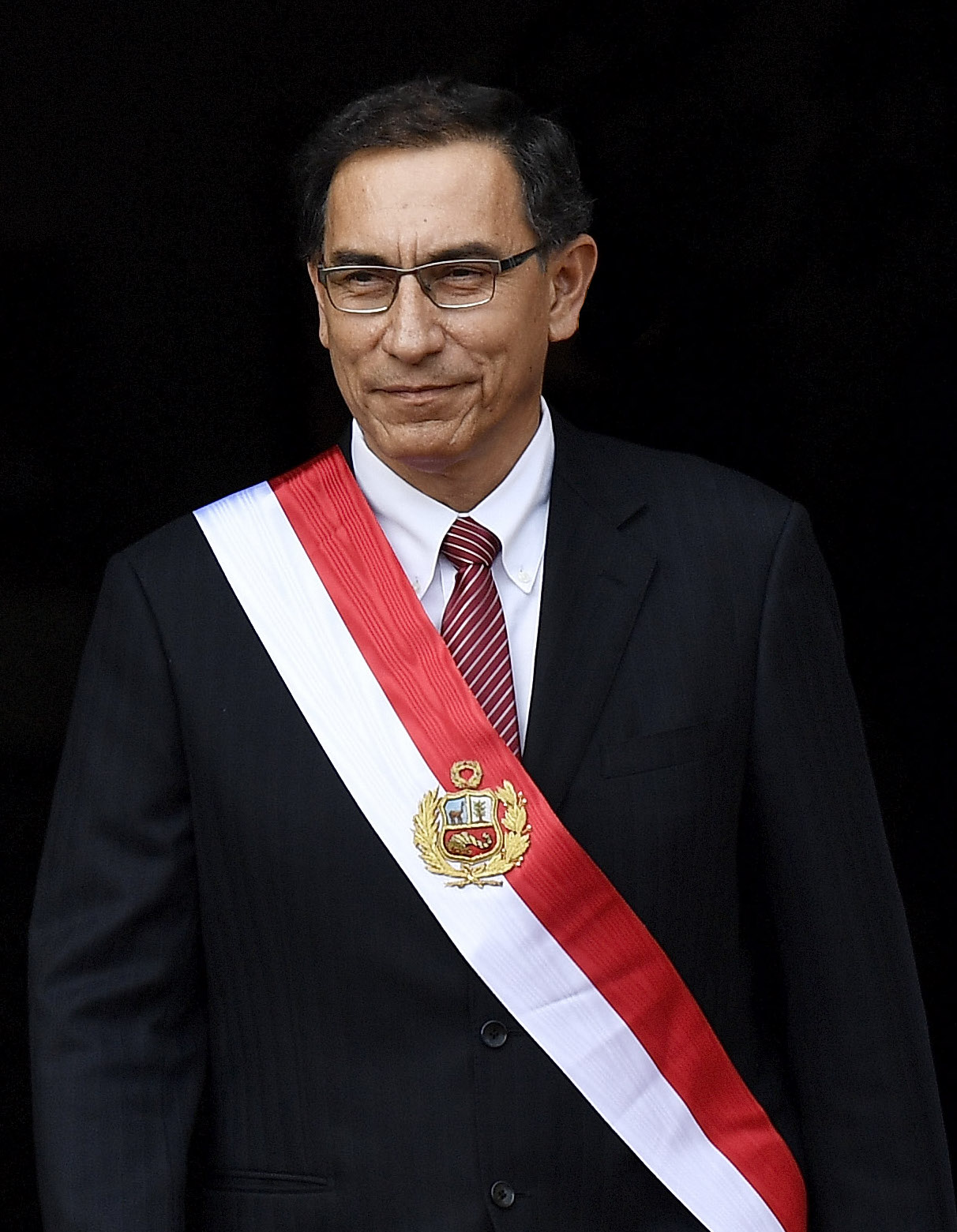
- Vizcarra in 2018

President of Peru
- In office 23 March 2018 – 9 November 2020
- Prime Minister: See list: Mercedes Aráoz César Villanueva Salvador del Solar Vicente Zeballos Pedro Cateriano Walter Martos
- Vice President: First Vice President; Vacant; Second Vice President; Mercedes Aráoz (Note: Resignation approved in May 2020. Both vice presidencies vacated since then.)
- Preceded by: Pedro Pablo Kuczynski
- Succeeded by: Manuel Merino

First Vice President of Peru
- In office 28 July 2016 – 23 March 2018
- President: Pedro Pablo Kuczynski
- Preceded by: Marisol Espinoza
- Succeeded by: Dina Boluarte (2021)
Additional positions
President pro tempore of the Pacific Alliance
In office 24 July 2018 – 6 July 2019
| Preceded by | Juan Manuel Santos |
| Succeeded by | Sebastián Piñera |
Ambassador of Peru to Canada
In office 18 October 2017 – 23 March 2018
| President | Pedro Pablo Kuczynski |
| Preceded by | Marcela López Bravo |
| Succeeded by | Carlos Gil de Montes Molinari |
Minister of Transport and Communications
In office 28 July 2016 – 22 May 2017
| Prime Minister | Fernando Zavala |
| Preceded by | José Gallardo Ku |
| Succeeded by | Bruno Giuffra |

Governor of Moquegua
- In office 1 January 2011 – 31 December 2014
- Lieutenant: Tomás Portilla Alarcón
- Preceded by: Jaime Rodríguez Villanueva
- Succeeded by: Jaime Rodríguez Villanueva

Member of Congress
- In office Never sworn-in (Note: On 16 April 2021, Vizcarra was banned from holding public office for 10 years after allegedly jumping the line to get a COVID-19 vaccine, with an 86–0 vote in Congress.)
- Replaced by: José Jerí
- Constituency: Lima

Personal details
- Born: Martín Alberto Vizcarra Cornejo; 22 March 1963 (age 63) Lima, Peru
- Party: Independent (2006–2021, since 2025)
- Other political affiliations: Peru First (2021–2025); We Are Peru (2020–2021 / non-affiliated); Peruvians for Change (2016–2018 / non-affiliated); Regional Integration for You (2010–2015); Peruvian Aprista Party (2006 / non-affiliated)
- Spouse: Maribel Díaz Cabello (m. 1992)
- Children: 4
- Education: National University of Engineering (B.S.)

Martín Alberto Vizcarra Cornejo OSP CYC GColIH (Latin American Spanish: [maɾˈtin alˈβeɾto βisˈkara koɾˈnexo]; (Note: In isolation, Vizcarra is pronounced [bisˈkara].) born 22 March 1963) is a Peruvian engineer and politician who served as President of Peru from 2018 to 2020. Vizcarra previously served as Governor of the Department of Moquegua (2011–2014), First Vice President of Peru (2016–2018), Minister of Transport and Communications of Peru (2016–2017), and Ambassador of Peru to Canada (2017–2018), with the latter three during the presidency of Pedro Pablo Kuczynski.

In the 2016 general election, Vizcarra ran with the Peruvians for Change presidential ticket as Pedro Pablo Kuczynski's running mate candidate for first vice president, narrowly defeating Keiko Fujimori's Popular Force ticket. On 23 March 2018, Vizcarra was sworn into office as President of Peru following the resignation of President Kuczynski. Throughout his tenure, Vizcarra remained independent from political parties, promoted reforms against corruption in the legislative and judicial branches, and vowed to not run for president when his term would end in 2021. During the COVID-19 pandemic in Peru, Vizcarra instituted stay-at-home orders and issued relief funds, but existing inequality, overcrowding and a largely informal economy saw Peru being heavily affected by the pandemic. As a result, Peru's gross domestic product declined thirty percent, increasing political pressure on Vizcarra's government.

On 30 September 2019, following what he described as a "factual denial of confidence" against his government, Vizcarra dissolved the Peruvian Congress and issued a decree for legislative elections. This initiated the 2019 constitutional crisis in which Congress unsuccessfully attempted to remove him and resulted in the resignation of Second Vice President Mercedes Aráoz. The snap election for a new congress was held on 26 January 2020, with the legislature elected becoming opposition-led once again. In September 2020, Congress opened impeachment proceedings against Vizcarra on grounds of "moral incapacity", accusing him of influence peddling after audio recordings were released by an opposition legislator, but the process did not receive enough votes to remove him from office.

On 9 November 2020, the Peruvian Congress impeached Vizcarra a second time after declaring him "morally incompetent" and removed him from office. The President of Congress and opposition leader Manuel Merino succeeded Vizcarra as President of Peru the following day. Vizcarra's impeachment incited street protests, as an overwhelming majority of Peruvians and political analysts believed the impeachment was unsubstantiated, with several Peruvian media outlets labeling the impeachment a "coup". President Merino resigned after six days in office following the killings of two protesters by police.

On 16 April 2021, former President Vizcarra was banned from holding public office for 10 years after allegedly jumping the line to get a COVID-19 vaccine in the Vacunagate controversy, by an 86–0 vote in Congress.

On 26 November 2025, Vizcarra was sentenced to 14 years in prison for taking bribes from construction companies during his tenure as Governor of Moquegua.

== Early life ==
Martín was born in Lima, to César Vizcarra Vargas, who was an American Popular Revolutionary Alliance (APRA) member, and Doris Cornejo, an elementary school teacher. Martín's father was the mayor of Moquegua and a member of the Constituent Assembly of 1978. His family was based in Moquegua, but moved to Lima due to a pulmonary complication that put Martín on the verge of death at his birth. Martín has stated that his father had a lasting impact on his life.

== Education ==
Vizcarra studied at the IEP Juan XXIII and the GUE Simón Bolívar, in Moquegua. For university education, Vizcarra graduated from the National University of Engineering in Lima in 1984 while also earning a degree in Management Administration from ESAN Graduate School of Business.

== Political career ==
=== Early political involvement ===
His political ambitions began in his home region of Moquegua, where he ran as an independent affiliated with the APRA party for the governorship in 2006, narrowly missing election. In 2008, Vizcarra led protests, known as "Moqueguazo", surrounding unequal mining payments to the community. He travelled to Lima to mediate the crisis, explaining the payment issue to the Peruvian Council of Ministers who agreed to make necessary changes to laws surrounding the issue. This event inspired Vizcarra's further political ambitions.

=== Governor of Moquegua ===
In the 2010 regional elections, Vizcarra was elected as the Governor of Moquegua and served in that position from 1 January 2011 to 31 December 2014. During his tenure, social indexes improved and he avoided corruption issues, an achievement The Washington Post described as "one of the rare examples" in Peru. He also played a major role in conciliating another mining conflict between the company Anglo American and residents concerning potential drinking water contamination by a proposed copper mine.

=== Vice-presidency (2016–2018) ===
Vizcarra was elected into the office of the First Vice President of Peru in 2016 general election, running beside Pedro Pablo Kuczynski of the Peruanos Por el Kambio party. Shortly after being elected, he was also tasked with serving as Minister of Transportation and Communications.

==== Minister of Transportation and Communications (2016–2017) ====
As Minister of Transportation and Communications, Vizcarra served for about one year. During a series of floods in late 2016 and early 2017 which devastated much of Peru, he was tasked with managing the crisis.

With allegations of bribery and bureaucracy plaguing the construction of the Chinchero International Airport in Cusco, Vizcarra cancelled many contracts until an investigation by the Comptroller's Office was completed. After facing complaints by political opponents and being summoned to provide hours of testimony surrounding the project, all while being tasked with providing reconstruction following the flooding that affected Peru, Vizcarra resigned his position as minister. Shortly after his resignation, the Comptroller General Edgar Alarcón recommended legal action against ten officials involved with the airport's construction.

Analysts stated that overall, Vizcarra's performance as minister was positive, but it was plagued by complications from the Fujimori family's political forces, known as Fujimorists.

==== Ambassador to Canada (2017–2018) ====
After resigning from the previous ministry, he was appointed to be the Peruvian Ambassador to Canada, avoiding public attention. He only returned to Peru during the first impeachment proceedings against President Kuczynski, returning to Canada shortly thereafter.

== Presidency (2018–2020) ==
Following the resignation of President Kuczynski, Vizcarra returned to Peru to assume the presidency on 23 March 2018, a day after his 55th birthday. Upon being sworn in, Vizcarra stated in regards to corruption, "we've had enough", promising to lead against such practices in the Andean nation.

Peruvian author and Nobel laureate in Literature Mario Vargas Llosa stated that Vizcarra's "credentials are pretty good" and that although other Peruvian politicians have faced political controversy, Vizcarra "has acted within the law". Vargas Llosa also noted that if Vizcarra's popularity were to increase enough, "then immediately in Congress, the Fujimorists will forget their internal struggles and will probably make life difficult for him".

=== Climate change ===
We must be responsible to leave a legacy to our children and the future generations of Peru.

— Martín Vizcarra, 17 April 2018

On 17 April 2018, President Vizcarra signed the Law for Climate Change, allowing for more funding toward the Ministry of the Environment (MINAM) to monitor and combat climate change by analyzing greenhouse gas emissions while also creating a framework of inter-ministerial cooperation regarding the climate.

The signing made Peru the first country in South America to have a climate law, with Vizcarra stating that climate change could no longer be ignored and that the Government of Peru had an obligation to work together to provide a better environment for future Peruvians.

=== Anti-corruption initiatives ===
==== 2018 Peruvian constitutional referendum ====
Following multiple corruption scandals facing the Peruvian government, on 28 July 2018, President Vizcarra called for a nationwide referendum to prohibit private funding for political campaigns, ban the reelection of lawmakers and to create a second legislative chamber.

The Washington Post stated that "Vizcarra's decisive response to a graft scandal engulfing the highest tiers of the judiciary ... has some Peruvians talking of a once-in-a-lifetime opportunity to restore integrity to public life and revive citizens' waning faith in democracy". Leftist lawmaker Marisa Glave, who was once a critic of Vizcarra, praised the move saying he had "connected with the people in a society that is both fed up with corruption but also deeply apolitical. It has put the Fujimorists in check". Transparency International also praised the move, stating that "This is a very important opportunity, one that is unlike previous opportunities because, in part, the president appears genuinely committed".

Following the temporary detention of Keiko Fujimori, legislators belonging to American Popular Revolutionary Alliance and the Fujimorist-led Popular Force introduced a bill the following day on 11 October 2018 to remove Vizcarra's referendum proposals and to modify the referendum with their own suggestions to the public.

On 9 December 2018, Peruvians ultimately accepted three of four of the proposals in the referendum, only rejecting the final proposal of creating a bicameral congress when Vizcarra withdrew his support when the Fujimorist-led congress manipulated the proposals contents which would have removed power from the presidency.

=== Dissolution of congress ===
In the Constitution of Peru, the executive branch can dissolve congress after a second vote of no-confidence. Under former president of Peru Pedro Pablo Kuczynski, the Congress of Peru made a no-confidence vote on 15 September 2017, resulting in the collapse of the Cabinet of Peru, the first vote of no-confidence during that current congressional body. Vizcarra enacted a constitutional process on 29 May 2019 that would create a motion of no confidence towards congress if they refused to cooperate with his proposed actions against corruption. For the next four months, congress delayed bills targeting corruption and postponed general elections proposed by Vizcarra.

Demanding reforms against corruption, Vizcarra called for a vote of no confidence on 27 September 2019, stating it was "clear the democracy of our nation is at risk". Vizcarra and the Inter-American Commission on Human Rights criticized congress for blocking a proposal for general elections while it quickly approved nominations to the Constitutional Court of Peru without investigating the backgrounds on nominees. Vizcarra sought to reform the Constitutional Court nomination process and congress' approval or disapproval of his proposal was seen "as a sign of confidence in his administration".

On 30 September 2019, congress named a new member to the Constitutional Court of Peru, who would most likely decide disputes between congress and the presidency, ignoring his proposal for reform. Vizcarra argued that the appointment by congress was the second act of no-confidence in his government, granting him the authority to dissolve congress. This act, as well as the months of slow progress towards anti-corruption reforms, pushed Vizcarra to dissolve congress later that day, with Vizcarra stating "Peruvian people, we have done all we could". Shortly after Vizcarra announced the dissolution of congress, the legislative body refused to recognize the president's actions, declared Vizcarra as suspended from the presidency and named vice president Mercedes Aráoz as the new president of Peru. Despite this, Peruvian government officials stated that the actions by congress were void as the body was officially closed at the time of their declarations. By nightfall, Peruvians gathered outside of the Legislative Palace of Peru to protest against congress and demand the removal of legislators while the heads of the Peruvian Armed Forces met with Vizcarra, announcing that they still recognized him as president of Peru and head of the armed forces.

In response to Vizcarra's actions, the media in Peru began a fearmongering campaign, arguing that left-wing political candidates would be elected in the parliamentary elections and attempt to draft a new constitution.

==== 2020 Peruvian parliamentary election ====
In January 2020, the Constitutional Court of Peru defended Vizcarra's actions, with four judges approving and three judges disapproving of the action. On 26 January 2020, a legislative election was held to replace the dissolved congress, with the previous Fujimorist majority being replaced with many centrist parties. Analysts Diego Pereira and Lucila Barbeito of JPMorgan Chase & Co described the new congress as being "even more antagonistic to the [Vizcarra] government than the previous one". According to Americas Quarterly, the four main right-wing parties of congress – Alliance for Progress, Podemos Perú, Popular Action and Union for Peru – feared Vizcarra's anti-corruption measures on campaign financing, political transparency and the participation of convicted persons in government.

=== COVID-19 pandemic ===
During Vizcarra's tenure, Peru experienced the second-highest number of COVID-19 cases in Latin America, with 292,004 cases and 10,045 deaths as of 2 July 2020. Medical experts commented that the severity of the outbreak in Peru can be explained at least in part due to existing socioeconomic circumstances. Nearly one-third of Peruvians live in overcrowded homes and 72% have informal jobs, requiring them to work daily. Many Peruvians needed to travel daily to markets to purchase food since only 49% of households own refrigerators or freezers; even in urban areas it is only 61%. Banks also experienced crowding as relief recipients without bank accounts had to go in person to obtain their stimulus payments. Vizcarra's government has responded to the pandemic by maintaining a nationwide lockdown since 15 March 2020, with all businesses except pharmacies, food vendors, financial institutions, and health facilities being closed.

Peru's gross domestic product fell 30.2 percent in the second quarter of 2020 as a result of economic lockdown measures, the largest decline of all major economies, with many small service businesses that represent the majority of businesses of Peru's economy going bankrupt during the crisis. Employment also dropped 40 percent compared to the previous rate while the Peruvian government approved 128 billion PEN ($35.8 billion USD) of tax relief and low-rate business loans to deter further economic decline.

=== Impeachment trials ===
The impeachment processes were led by the imprisoned Antauro Humala and his Union for Peru (UPP) party, according to reports in Peru. Humala was sentenced to 19 years in prison following his Andahuaylazo uprising against President Alejandro Toledo that resulted in the deaths of police. From his cell, Humala reportedly orchestrated the impeachment process with members of congress and his UPP supporters. Edgar Alarcón, a UPP congressman and a close supporter of Humala, took charge with the impeachment processes against Vizcarra, making the charges that began both trials. Alarcón himself, according to Vice News, was protected from criminal charges of embezzlement and illicit monetary gains due to parliamentary immunity, charges that could have resulted with seventeen years in prison.

==== First impeachment trial (September 2020) ====
As Peru's economy declined due to the pandemic, Vizcarra faced increased political pressure from the newly inaugurated congress presided by Manuel Merino, with the majority of the legislative body being controlled by those opposing Vizcarra. Since early 2020, investigations began surrounding a contract for a little-known singer Richard Cisneros to perform speeches for the Ministry of Culture. It was alleged that an inexperienced Cisneros was able to receive payments totaling US$50,000 due to contacts in the Government Palace.

Investigators searched offices in the Government Palace on 1 June 2020 regarding the alleged irregularities. According to IDL-Reporteros, lobbyist Karelim López provided opposition lawmaker Edgar Alarcon audio recordings. On 10 September 2020, Alarcon, who faced possible parliamentary immunity revocation related to alleged acts of corruption, released audio recordings purporting that Vizcarra acted with "moral incapacity". The recordings allegedly contain audio of Vizcarra instructing his staff to say that he met with Cisneros only on a limited number of occasions and audio of Cisneros saying that he influenced Vizcarra's rise to office and decision to dissolve congress.

Merino quickly initiated a movement to remove Vizcarra from office. As President of Congress, Merino would assume the presidential office if Vizcarra's was vacated. Vizcarra responded to the release of the recordings, stating, "I am not going to resign. I am not running away" and that the "audios have been edited and maliciously manipulated; as you can see, they purposely seek to turn a job-related claim into a criminal or political act, wanting to take words out of context and intend to accuse me of non-existent situations. Nothing is further from reality".

On 11 September 2020, the Peruvian Congress voted 65–36 with 24 abstentions to open impeachment proceedings against Vizcarra for "moral incapacity". At least 52 votes in favor were needed to approve the opening of the impeachment proceedings. After reports emerged that Merino reportedly reached out to the Peruvian armed forces to support the process and was forming his own cabinet, support among lawmakers for impeaching Vizcarra decreased.

As scheduled, Vizcarra appeared in Congress on 18 September to defend himself and delivered a 20-minute speech after its session began. After a 10-hour debate, Congress voted 32–78 with 15 abstentions against removing Vizcarra from office, far from the 87 votes (out of 130) that were needed by the opposition to impeach him. Had Vizcarra already been impeached by that time, Merino would have already acted as interim leader until the current presidential term ends in July 2021.

==== Second impeachment trial (November 2020) ====
In a separate impeachment trial, lawmakers from nine opposition parties accused Vizcarra of corruption and mishandling of the COVID-19 pandemic in the country. He was also accused of accepting bribes from companies that won at least two public works contracts—one for a hospital and another for an irrigation project—during his term as governor of Moquegua Department. On 9 November 2020, a total of 105 members of Congress voted to remove Vizcarra from office, exceeding the 87 votes (out of 130) that were needed to impeach him. Vizcarra called the accusations baseless and false, but still accepted the vote by Congress and promised not to take any other legal action.

Vizcarra's impeachment was considered by many as a coup d'état. It is suggested that the audios about alleged bribes were influenced and promoted by prosecutor Germán Juárez Atoche, with the collaboration of employees of Obrainsa, a company in Moquegua. An editorial in La República in 2020 indicated that the regular leaks and the adoption of their content by politicians who supported the impeachment, as well as the change of attitude of lawyers towards the previously criticized prosecutors, offered an answer to those who questioned these events. According to the editorial, this showed that there is no such thing as a perfect coup d'état.

Thousands of citizens then gathered in protests against Vizcarra's impeachment. Manuel Merino, who succeeded him as president the following day, resigned on 15 November. Francisco Sagasti was made President of Congress on the 16th and thus succeeded Merino as President of Peru on 17 November per Peru's presidential line of succession, since both vice presidential positions were vacated by Vizcarra in 2018 and Mercedes Aráoz in May 2020.

== Post-presidency (2020–present) ==
=== Congressional campaign ===
Vizcarra announced on 27 November 2020 that he would campaign for a seat in congress for the 2021 Peruvian congressional election, joining the We Are Peru party, a party that voted for his removal just weeks before. The We Are Peru party's presidential candidate Daniel Salaverry welcomed Vizcarra to the party. If elected into congress, Vizcarra would obtain parliamentary immunity from the investigations that resulted with his removal from the presidency. When asked if attempting to avoid prosecution for corruption was his motivation to run for congress, Vizcarra stated "One of the flags that I am going to carry in this electoral process, to be fulfilled in Congress if elected, is precisely to completely reform the concept of parliamentary immunity, ... It cannot be that the Congress of the Republic has used parliamentary immunity".

Vizcarra won the congressional race, though he would later be banned from holding public office in Peru.

=== Vacunagate ===
In February 2021, the scandal known as Vacunagate broke out, in which it was revealed that in October 2020 Vizcarra, alongside his family and friends, was vaccinated with the Sinopharm COVID-19 vaccine before it was able to reach the Peruvian public. The revelation sparked controversy, as at the time the Vizcarra government said there was still no negotiations regarding the COVID-19 vaccine. On 16 April 2021, the Congress of Peru in an 86 to 0 vote decided to ban Vizcarra from public office for a ten-year period. He was found guilty of influence peddling, collusion and making false declarations.

=== Request for preventive detention ===
On 12 March 2021, the prosecutor Germán Juárez Atoche requested preventive detention for 18 months for Vizcarra. This was within the framework of the investigation for the alleged crimes of aggravated collusion, improper passive bribery and illicit association to commit a crime. The hearing was scheduled for 17 March, where Judge María de los Ángeles Álvarez Camacho, after hearing both reasons from the prosecution and the defense of Vizcarra, rejected the request for preventive detention and appearance with restrictions was imposed.

On 18 March 2024, the Peruvian Public Prosecutor's Office raided the home of Martín Vizcarra, in the most luxurious neighborhood of the country, in the midst of an investigation against him for alleged corruption in a road construction program during his administration.

=== Corruption case ===
On 14 August 2025, Judge Chávez Tamariz ruled in favour of preventive detention against Vizcarra, saying that it was necessary to ensure Vizcarra's presence when the ruling was handed down in the Lomas de Ilo case. The judge cited flight risk concerns as the reason for the ruling. Following an appeal, he was ordered released on 3 September.

On 26 November 2025, Vizcarra was sentenced by the judiciary to 14 years in prison for taking bribes from construction companies while serving as governor of Moquegua between 2011 and 2014. The court concluded that Vizcarra accepted the payment of 2% of the amount of S/80,981,137.34 for the Lomas de Ilo project from the Obrainsa consortium, and signed the contract for the Moquegua Hospital project after he was paid S/1,300,000. Both projects correspond to six and eight-year sentences respectively. He was ordered to pay a fine of S/94,900 and the court ruled that S/2,336,000 in civil damages must be jointly paid by Vizcarra and the parties that bribed him. His sentence also bans him from holding public office for nine years. He is serving his sentence at the Barbadillo Prison in Chorrillos District (the same prison where former presidents Alejandro Toledo and Ollanta Humala were incarcerated) and will not be released until November 2039.

Vizcarra, through his X account, described the sentence as "politically motivated" and added that "I have been sentenced for standing up to the mafia pact. This is not justice, it is revenge. But they will not break me. The answer lies at the ballot box." He also announced that his brother Mario Vizcarra, who is a candidate in the 2026 Peruvian presidential election, would continue his political project.

== Approval ratings ==
During Vizcarra's inauguration ceremony, some Peruvians took to the streets to protest against the government, calling for the removal of all politicians. Weeks later, an Ipsos survey in April 2018 found that out of those asked Vizcarra had an approval rate of 57%, a disapproval rate of 13% while about 30% of respondents were undecided. A month later, Vizcarra's approval rating dipped to 52% according to a May 2018 Ipsos survey. By September 2018 after he had called for a referendum, thousands of Peruvians marched in support of his proposal and to protest against Congress, with Ipsos reporting that Vizcarra's approval rating reached a peak of 66% in December 2018.

Into 2019, Ipsos polls showed that support for Vizcarra began to decline early in the year, that his approval rating in April 2019 was at 44% compared to 45% disapproval and that approval ratings were higher among upper-income respondents compared to lower-income respondents. By the time Vizcarra dissolved Congress, The Washington Post described him as "an unexpectedly popular president" as he dealt with "the monumental task of rooting out the South American nation's widespread corruption". After the dissolution of Congress, Vizcarra's approval rating jumped from about 40% to 75% according to the Institute of Peruvian Studies (IEP), while 76% of respondents recognized him as the constitutional president of Peru. Another poll by Peruvian pollster CPI found 85.1% of respondents approved of Vizcarra and 89.1% recognized him as president.

During the early months of the 2020 COVID-19 pandemic, approval ratings for Vizcarra spiked to 87% in March 2020 and gradually decreased in the following months.

=== Approval ratings of Vizcarra's removal from office ===
In November 2020, the month of Vizcarra's second impeachment and removal from office, a poll by Ipsos polling firm showed that 88% percent of Peruvians disapproved of Vizcarra's removal, while only 11% approved. The October 2020 Ipsos poll stated that 54% of Peruvians approved of Vizcarra while 41% disapproved. By contrast, the Congress of Peru had a 60% disapproval rating in October 2020, and when President of Congress Manuel Merino assumed the office of President of Peru after Vizcarra's ousting by Congress, 94% of Peruvians disapproved of Merino's presidency.

== Public image ==
Following Peru's 2020 legislative elections that replaced an unpopular Congress, The Economist wrote "By championing the fight against corruption, Mr Vizcarra has achieved the rare feat for a Peruvian president of remaining popular". More than 80% of Peruvians supported Vizcarra's move to dissolve Congress and call for new elections. Americas Quarterly penned that Vizcarra had "overwhelming public support", but without a political party or allies in Congress, his anti-corruption initiatives faced resistance. At the time that Vizcarra was removed from office, more than 50% of Peruvians approved of his performance as president and 75% to 88% of Peruvians thought that he should not have been removed from office.

== Political ideology ==
Vizcarra is described as a centrist and he has attributed his political beliefs as stemming from his father, with Vizcarra saying that his guidance made him concerned about social issues. He values his ability to "know how to listen" and to "go step by step", with his supporters often describing him as a bridge builder who is able to mediate complicated situations. Left-wing parties applauded Vizcarra's anti-corruption efforts, his dissolution of Congress and his attempts to move forward with general elections.

== Honours ==
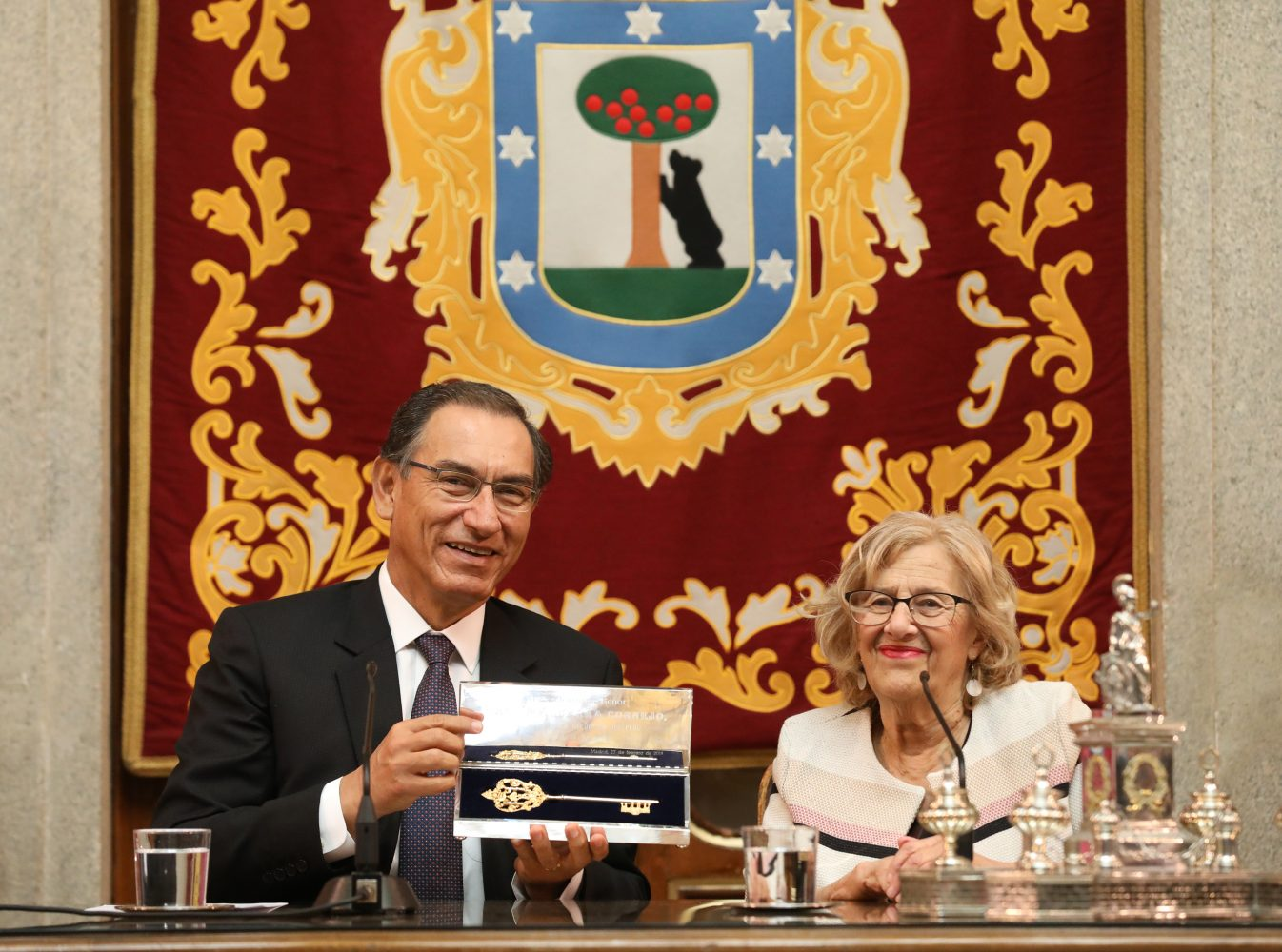
Vizcarra receiving the Keys to the City of Madrid next to Manuela Carmena

| Awards and orders | Country | Date | Notes |
|---|---|---|---|
| Grand Master of the Order of the Sun of Peru | Peru | 23 March 2018 | |
| Grand Master of the Order of Merit for Distinguished Service | Peru | 23 March 2018 | |
| Grand Collar National Order of Merit | Ecuador | 25 October 2018 | |
| Grand Collar of the Order of Prince Henry | Portugal | 25 February 2019 | |
| Knight of the Collar of the Order of Isabella the Catholic | Spain | 22 February 2019 | |
| Keys to the City of Madrid | Spain | 27 February 2019 | |

== Electoral history ==
| Year | Office | Type | Party | Main opponent | Party | Votes for Vizcarra | | | | Result | Swing |
| Year | Office | Type | Party | Main opponent | Party | Total | % | P. | ±% | Result | Swing |
|---|---|---|---|---|---|---|---|---|---|---|---|
| 2006 | Governor of Moquegua | Regional | Peruvian Aprista Party | Jaime Rodríguez Villanueva | Independent | 22,900 | 26.42% | 2nd | N/A | Lost | N/A |
| 2010 | Governor of Moquegua | Regional | Independent | Zenón Cuevas Pare | Independent | 35,388 | 38.54% | 1st | N/A | Won | Gain |
| 2016 | First Vice President of Peru | General | Peruvians for Change | José Chlimper | Popular Force | 3,228,661 | 21.04% | 2nd | N/A | N/A | N/A |
| 2016 | First Vice President of Peru | General (second round) | Peruvians for Change | José Chlimper | Popular Force | 8,596,937 | 50.12% | 1st | N/A | Won | Gain |
| 2021 | Congressman from Lima | General | We Are Peru | N/A | N/A | 208,367 | 8.19% | 5th | N/A | Won | Gain |

== See also ==
- "Mi Bebito Fiu Fiu", a song about Vizcarra's alleged infidelity.

=== Notes ===
Political offices
| Preceded by Jaime Rodríguez Villanueva | Governor of the Moquegua Region; 2011–2014 | Succeeded by Jaime Rodríguez Villanueva |
| Preceded by José Gallardo Ku | Minister of Transport and Communications; 2016–2017 | Succeeded by Bruno Giuffra |
| Preceded by Marisol Espinoza | First Vice President of Peru; 2016–2018 | Succeeded by Mercedes Aráoz |
| Preceded by Pedro Pablo Kuczynski | President of Peru; 2018–2020 | Succeeded by Manuel Merino |
Diplomatic posts
| Preceded by Marcela López Bravo | Ambassador of Peru to Canada; 2017–2018 | Succeeded by Carlos Gil de Montes Molinari |
