= Second impeachment of Martín Vizcarra =

2020 impeachment of Peru's 60th president

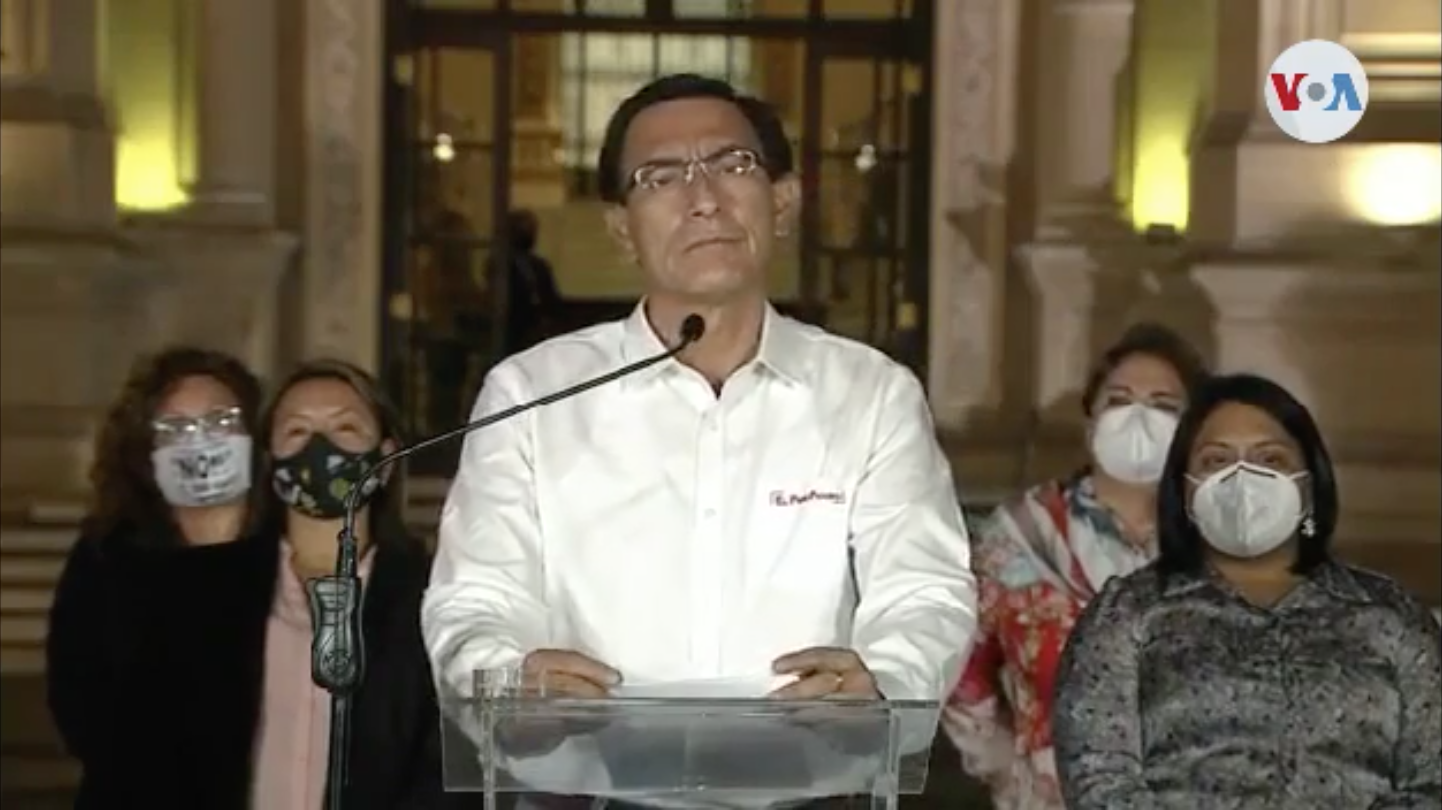
- Martín Vizcarra, flanked by his ministers, announcing his return home on 9 November following the vacancy vote
- Accused: Martín Vizcarra, President of Peru
- Date: 20 October 2020 – 9 November 2020
- Outcome: Vizcarra impeached, removed from office
- Charges: Presumed permanent moral incapacity
- Cause: Revelation of alleged illicit payments from construction companies to President Vizcarra: as Governor of Moquegua; as Minister of Transport and Communications

Legislative votes by the Congress of Peru

Impeachment vote (2 November 2020)
- Accusation: Moral incapacity
- Votes in favor: 60
- Votes against: 40
- Present: 18
- Not voting: 12
- Result: Vizcarra impeached by Congress

Removal vote (9 November 2020)
- Accusation: Moral incapacity
- Votes in favor: 105
- Votes against: 19
- Present: 4
- Not voting: 2
- Result: Vizcarra convicted by Congress and removed from office (87 votes required for a conviction); Manuel Merino becomes president

The removal of Martín Vizcarra, president of Peru, was initiated by the Congress of Peru on 8 October 2020 under the grounds of "permanent moral incapacity". On 20 October 2020, political factions Union for Peru, Podemos Perú, and Broad Front co-signed a series of articles of impeachment against President Vizcarra for alleged cases of corruption during his term as the governor of Moquegua. Vizcarra was removed from office on 9 November 2020 in a 105–16 vote.

Initially, the vote to start impeachment proceedings was scheduled for 31 October, but it was later extended to the first week of November. Finally it was decided that the vote and debate would be held on 2 November. When the date arrived, impeachment was initiated with 60 votes in favor, 40 against and 18 abstentions. Vizcarra attended the plenary session in Congress on 9 November to defend himself against the accusations.

After hearing the President's defense, Congress debated and approved the removal of Vizcarra due to moral incapacity with 105 votes in favor, surpassing the 87 out of 130 vote supermajority threshold required to convict a political official. Vizcarra became the third president to have been successfully impeached and removed from office, along with Guillermo Billinghurst (1914) and Alberto Fujimori (2000). Along with his predecessor Pedro Pablo Kuczynski and current U.S. President Donald Trump, he is one of three heads of state to be impeached twice.

The controversial removal of Vizcarra was defined as a coup by many Peruvians, political analysts and media outlets in the country, resulting with the beginning of the 2020 Peruvian protests. Reported involvement of the ethnocacerist politician Antauro Humala and the introduction of charges by his party Union for Peru in both impeachment trials also raised concerns about the motives of removing Vizcarra.

== Background ==
=== Legal ===
Article 113, Section 1 of the Constitution of Peru establishes five possible reasons under which the President of the Republic can leave office:

1. Death of the President,
2. Permanent moral or physical incapacity, as declared by Congress,
3. Resignation,
4. Leaving national territory without permission from Congress or not returning within the approved period, or
5. Dismissal, after having been sanctioned for any of the offenses mentioned in Article 117 of the Constitution.

As of 2020, there was no procedure that clearly established the conditions in which the "moral incapacity" clause in impeachment can be applied, which is why the Constitutional Court Judgment No. 0006- 2003-AI / TC established as a criterion that the removal of the president of the republic could only be approved with a qualified vote of at least two thirds of the legal number of congressmen, urging Congress to legislate on the matter in order to fill the legal void then existing. In response to this, by means of Legislative Resolution of Congress No. 030-2003-CR, article 89-A was introduced in the Congress Regulations.

In this way, it was established that the qualified vote necessary to be able to vacate the office of president of the republic, must reach a minimum of 87 votes, which corresponds to two-thirds of the legal number of congressmen, considering that in the Peruvian congress the number of members is 130.

Although the Constitution is clear in stating the "permanent moral or physical incapacity" as a cause of presidential vacancy, on the other hand, the Constitution itself also indicates in its Article 117 that the President of the Republic can only be accused, during his term, for treason against the fatherland; for preventing presidential, parliamentary, regional or municipal elections; for dissolving Congress, except in the cases provided for in Article 134 of the Constitution, and for preventing its meeting or operation, or those of the National Elections Jury and other bodies of the electoral system. This article was invoked by President Kuczynski's attorney during his defense plea before Congress when facing the first vacancy request in 2017.

=== First impeachment process ===
The impeachment process was led by the imprisoned Antauro Humala and his Union for Peru (UPP) party, according to reports in Peru. Humala was sentenced to 19 years in prison following his Andahuaylazo uprising against President Alejandro Toledo that resulted in the deaths of police. From his cell, Humala reportedly orchestrated the impeachment process with members of congress and his UPP supporters. Edgar Alarcón, a UPP congressman and a close supporter of Humala, took charge with the impeachment process against Vizcarra. Alarcón himself, according to Vice News, was protected from criminal charges of embezzlement and illicit monetary gains due to parliamentary immunity, charges that could have resulted with seventeen years in prison.

During the first impeachment due to "permanent moral incapacity", the congressmen promoting Vizcarra's removal alleged that Vizcarra had denied on several occasions the fact of knowing the singer Richard Swing, with supposed audio of Vizcarra presented by UPP congressman Edgar Alarcón alleging the obstruction of the investigations, and for violating the principles of good administration and budget justice by hiring Richard Swing in the Ministry of Culture.

President of Congress Manuel Merino was criticized by critics regarding how he hastily pushed for impeachment proceedings against Vizcarra. If Vizcarra were to be removed from office, Merino would assume the presidential office given his position in congress and due to the absence of vice presidents for Vizcarra. On 12 September 2020, renowned reporter Gustavo Gorriti wrote that Merino had contacted the Commanding General of the Peruvian Navy, Fernando Cerdán, notifying him that he was going to attempt to impeach Vizcarra and was hoping to assume the presidency. Minister of Defense Jorge Chávez confirmed that Merino had tried to establish support with the Peruvian military. A second report was later released that Merino had contacted officials throughout Peru's government while preparing to create a transitional cabinet. Following the release of these reports, support for impeaching Vizcarra decreased among members of congress.

On 18 September, Vizcarra gave a speech for twenty minutes after appearing before congress. Following ten hours of deliberation, 32 members of congress supported the motion to remove Vizcarra from the office of the presidency, 78 voted against his removal and 15 abstained from voting, with 87 votes of 130 being required for his removal.

== Events ==
After the first attempt failed, Edgar Alarcón of Union for Peru raised a new vacancy request in October 2020, based on the alleged acts of corruption by Vizcarra when he was regional Governor of Moquegua, which includes the testimony of an applicant to an effective collaborator in the "Construction Club Case" who stated that Obrainsa company paid him 1 million soles and three other aspiring effective collaborators also point out that he received 1.3 million soles from the Ingenieros Civiles y Contractors Generales SA consortium (ICCGSA), and Incot for the tender of the project for the construction of the Regional Hospital of Moquegua in 2013.

=== Impeachment vote ===
The new impulse to the vacancy motion came, then, at the initiative of the left party Union for Peru, Broad Front, Podemos Perú, Popular Action and a number of independents. The motion received 27 signatures, surpassing the minimum threshold required to pose an impeachment inquiry (26 congressmen). The motion was presented to Congress on October 20, 2020. A minimum of 52 votes from Congress is required to initiate impeachment proceedings.

On 25 October, Walter Martos announced that the Armed Forces “[will not] allow the rule of law to be broken with such need of the people. At this moment, five months before the elections, ”which was highly controversial because Article 169 of the Political Constitution of Peru states that the Armed Forces and National Police are not deliberative and are subordinate to the constitutional process. On October 27, Martos said that his statements were misinterpreted and stated that "We will never use [in reference to the government] the Armed Forces in political acts beyond their function."

On 2 November 2020, the admission of the vacancy motion was debated in the plenary session of Congress, at the end of which the plenary session of Congress proceeded to vote on the motion, obtaining 60 votes in favor of starting the vacancy process, 40 votes in against and 18 abstentions. The motion received the unanimous support of the Union for Peru, other parliamentary groups decided to vote freely without a collegiate consensus, the parliamentarians of Alliance for Progress and the Purple Party were against, the parliamentarians of FREPAP and 3 legislators from other benches abstained.

=== Vacancy vote ===
Vizcarra minimized the vacancy motion, saying he trusted that in Parliament "sanity will prevail" and pointed out that "The only thing that we do not accept is that among the arguments they put in the vacancy motion, is that they use that transparent elections are not guaranteed. Please. That we do not accept. What we are doing here is guaranteeing totally transparent elections, because we do not participate in the elections. What greater transparency of this? ". He also accused some political parties of wanting to affect the general elections of 2021 since" they have no chance in the elections." Nevertheless, Merino ratified defense of the planned elections day. Likewise, the president of the Council of Ministers Walter Martos pointed out that "a group of congressmen is breaking the Constitution" and considered that it is "tremendously irresponsible" that a second vacancy motion is raised.

On the other hand, part of the congressmen of the Broad Front, specifically the congressmen Mirtha Vásquez and Rocío Silva Santisteban, expressed that they would not support the vacancy motion and issued a statement in which they said that "We cannot and do not want to stop putting life first, and especially life, at the risk of a fresh start to change health strategies that could lead to more and more deaths.

Reports emerged following the vote from IDL-Reporteros that multiple congressmen pledged support to Vizcarra and later voted for his removal on 9 November. While visiting Cajamarca on 6 November, Vizcarra did not appear worried about the vacancy vote according to one source, though some on the trip with Vizcarra appeared distant and refused to be in photographs with the president. Somos Peru congress woman Felícita Tocto told Vizcarra that she would vote against the vacancy and encourage colleagues to do the same, though she would later vote in favor of his removal.

==== Vizcarra appears in Congress ====
On 9 November, initial discussions between Vizcarra and congressmen left him feeling positive as he appeared in Congress. While at the legislative palace, Vizcarra criticized legislators who sought to vacate him from office, saying that sixty-eight congressmen were being investigated for alleged crimes themselves. Vizcarra also said that the contracts in question were administered by an agency assigned by the United Nations, not his own office. Ministerial staff stated that following Vizcarra's comments, the dozens of legislators that Vizcarra mentioned became determined to convince other members of congress to support votes for his removal, making strong arguments against Vizcarra.

==== Vizcarra loses support ====
Hans Troyes of Popular Action reported that in the intermission room of the legislative palace, those in support of Vizcarra's removal told legislators that said they wanted to abstain or vote against the president's removal that they would refuse to sign their bills proposed in congress. After returning from a trip to Junín after his speech in congress, Vizcarra received a call from César Acuña–who had told Vizcarra his Alliance for Progress party would not support his removal–with Acuña warning Vizcarra that his party would vote in support of his removal. Vizcarra did not propose any defense to Acuña and ended the call shortly after learning this information.

Shortly before the vacancy vote, Vizcarra and his ministerial staff learned that many congressmen had turned away from supporting him and calls to legislators were not being answered. After learning what the outcome of the vote would be, Vizcarra gathered his ministers at the Government Palace at 7:30pm PET, telling those close to him "Up to here and no more ... I'm tired", telling ministers "I don't want to give the impression that I want to cling to power". He then spoke to the public and departed from the Government Palace on the same night.

==== Voting results ====
The debate on the request for presidential vacancy was scheduled for Monday, November 9, the date on which the president must exercise his right of defense.

President	Date	Vote	Popular Action	Alliance for Progress	FREPAP	Popular Force	UPP	Podemos Perú	We Are Peru	Purple Party	Broad Front	Ind.	Total
Martín Vizcarra Ind.	November 9, 2020 Motion approved Convicted	Yes	18	20	14	15	12	10	7		6	3	105 / 130
Martín Vizcarra Ind.	November 9, 2020 Motion approved Convicted	No	4					1	2	9	2	1	19 / 130
Martín Vizcarra Ind.	November 9, 2020 Motion approved Convicted	Absent			1		1						2 / 130
Martín Vizcarra Ind.	November 9, 2020 Motion approved Convicted	Abstain	2	1								1	4 / 155

== Response ==
The Organization of American States (OAS), through a statement, mentioned that “it wishes to express its concern about the political situation taking place in Peru. Taking into account the context of the pandemic - unfortunately still in force - and its effects on health and human lives," also stating that "Peru has shown to have institutional strength to overcome previous political crises. On this occasion the resolution of the current crisis is imperative".

== See also ==
- 2017–present Peruvian political crisis
- First impeachment process against Martín Vizcarra
- First impeachment process against Pedro Pablo Kuczynski
- Second impeachment and resignation of Pedro Pablo Kuczynski
- 2019–2020 Peruvian constitutional crisis
- 2020 Peruvian protests
- Attempts for removing Pedro Castillo
- 2022 Peruvian protests
