= First impeachment of Martín Vizcarra =

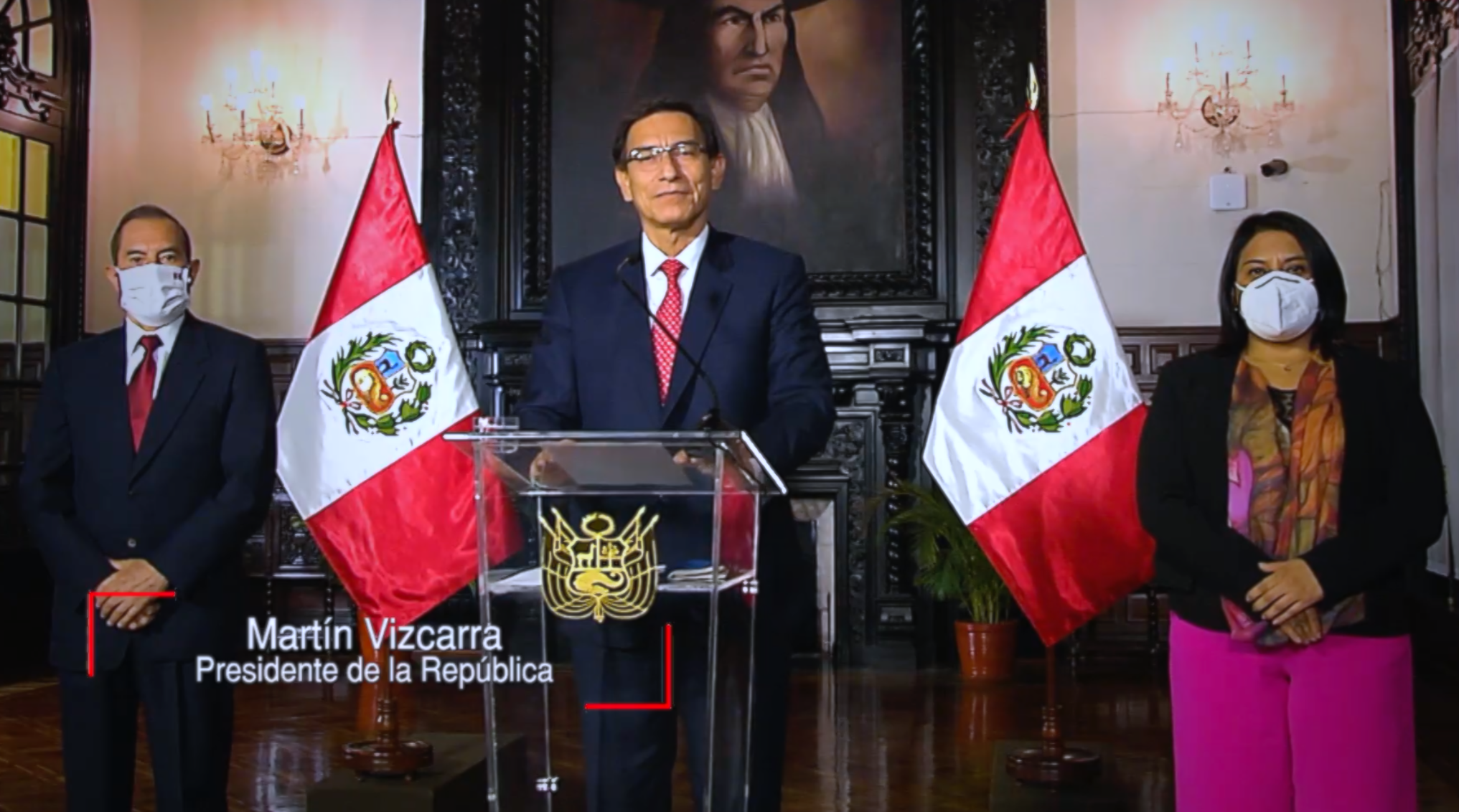
- President Martín Vizcarra responding to calls for impeachment on 10 September 2020
- Accused: Martín Vizcarra, president of Peru
- Proponents: Manuel Merino, president of the Congress of Peru
- Date: September 11, 2020 to September 18, 2020
- Outcome: Acquitted by Congress, remains in office
- Charges: Adopted: "moral incapacity" under Article 113 § 2 of the Constitution of Peru

The impeachment process against Martín Vizcarra began in the Congress of Peru on 11 September 2020 when Congress initiated proceedings against Vizcarra on grounds of "moral incapacity", accusing him of influence peddling after audio recordings were released by an opposition legislator alleging that Vizcarra's political decisions were swayed by an obscure singer.

Vizcarra was impeached on 11 September 2020. He was eventually acquitted by Congress on 18 September 2020.

== Timeline ==
=== Background ===
Martín Vizcarra was elected as First Vice President of Peru in a 2016 general election, running with Pedro Pablo Kuczynski of the Peruanos Por el Kambio party. On 23 March 2018, Vizcarra was sworn into office as president of Peru following the resignation of President Kuczynski. Upon being sworn into office, Vizcarra stated "we've had enough", vowing to combat corruption as president.

Throughout Vizcarra's tenure, he faced opposition from the Congress of Peru. He initially faced opposition from the Fujimorist congress when pushing for the constitutional referendum in 2018, an election that resulted with laws prohibiting the private funding of political campaigns and a ban on reelecting lawmakers. Into 2019, the Fujimorist congress continued to delay Vizcarra's reforms, with Vizcarra later dissolving the congress after instituting a motion of no confidence, saying it was "clear the democracy of our nation is at risk".

A legislative election was held later on 26 January 2020 which replaced the dissolved congress, with centrist parties replacing the Fujimorist majority in congress. Analysts Diego Pereira and Lucila Barbeito of JPMorgan Chase & Co described the new congress as being "even more antagonistic to the [Vizcarra] government than the previous one" while Americas Quarterly wrote that the four main right-wing parties of congress – Alliance for Progress, Podemos Perú, Popular Action and Union for Peru – feared Vizcarra's anti-corruption measures on campaign financing, political transparency and the participation of convicted persons in government.

As Peru's economy declined due to the COVID-19 pandemic in Peru, Vizcarra faced increased political pressure from the newly inaugurated congress presided by Manuel Merino, with the majority of the legislative body being controlled by those opposing Vizcarra. Finally on 5 July 2020, Vizcarra proposed a referendum to be held during the 2021 Peruvian general election to remove parliamentary immunity, though congress quickly responded by assembling that same night to pass their own immunity bill that contained proposals to remove immunity from the president, constitutional court and the human rights ombudsman while also strengthening some instances of parliamentary immunity.

=== Cisneros tapes ===
Since early 2020, investigations began surrounding a contract for a little-known singer by the name of Richard Cisneros to perform speeches for the Ministry of Culture. It was alleged that an inexperienced Cisneros was able to receive payments totaling US$50,000 due to contacts in the Government Palace. Investigators searched offices in the Government Palace on 1 June 2020 regarding the alleged irregularities.

According to IDL-Reporteros, lobbyist Karelim López provided opposition lawmaker Edgar Alarcon audio recordings. On 10 September 2020, Alarcon, who faced possible parliamentary immunity revocation related to alleged acts of corruption, released audio recordings purporting that Vizcarra acted with "moral incapacity". The recordings allegedly contain audio of Vizcarra instructing his staff to say that he met with Cisneros only on a limited number of occasions and audio of Cisneros saying that he influenced Vizcarra's rise to office and decision to dissolve congress.

Vizcarra responded to the release of the recordings stating "I am not going to resign. I am not running away" and that the "audios have been edited and maliciously manipulated; as you can see, they purposely seek to turn a job-related claim into a criminal or political act, wanting to take words out of context and intend to accuse me of non-existent situations. Nothing is further from reality".

=== Vote on impeachment proceedings ===
In a vote on 11 September 2020, impeachment proceedings against Vizcarra were approved by congress; 65 voted for, 36 voted against and 24 abstained.

Vote on impeaching President Martín Vizcarra in the Congress of the Republic
Ballot	11 September 2020
Absentees	5 / 130
Required majority	52 out of 130 (two fifths of the legal number of legislators)
Yes	65 / 130
No	36 / 130
Abstentions	24 / 130

=== Merino reports ===
Peru's democracy is, unfortunately, sinking further and further into crisis, ... The removal of the president is a really big deal, and it requires serious deliberation, public debate and investigation. There has been none.

— Steve Levitsky

President of Congress Manuel Merino was criticized by critics regarding how he hastily pushed for impeachment proceedings against Vizcarra. If Vizcarra were to be removed from office, Merino would assume the presidential office given his position in congress and due to the absence of vice presidents for Vizcarra. (Note: Peru has two Vice Presidents, a First and Second Vice President. The most recent holders of the office of First and Second Vice President were Vizcarra and Mercedes Aráoz, respectively, who were elected in the 2016 election. Vizcarra left the office of First Vice President vacant after he succeeded Kuzcynski as President, leaving Aráoz as the sole Vice President, while Aráoz resigned as Second Vice President on 1 October 2019 after the Congress of Peru named Aráoz acting President the day before after having declared Vizacarra temporarily unfit for office, despite Congress having itself been dissolved earlier that day by President Vizcarra, resulting in a constitutional crisis. However, her resignation was not official until it was accepted on 7 May 2020 by the new Congress of Peru sworn on 16 March 2020, since in Peru the resignation of the vice president has to be accepted by Congress and that institution was not celebrating meetings given its dissolution.)

On 12 September 2020, renowned reporter Gustavo Gorriti wrote that Merino had contacted the Commanding General of the Peruvian Navy, Fernando Cerdán, notifying him that he was going to attempt to impeach Vizcarra and was hoping to assume the presidency. Minister of Defense Jorge Chávez confirmed that Merino had tried to establish support with the Peruvian military. A second report was later released that Merino had contacted officials throughout Peru's government while preparing to create a transitional cabinet. Following the release of these reports, support for impeaching Vizcarra decreased among members of congress.

=== Vizcarra counters proceedings ===
On 14 September, President Vizcarra filed a lawsuit in the Constitutional Court of Peru to block the 18 September impeachment vote, stating to during a press conference, "Why has the president of Congress communicated with top military officials, and even planned pseudo-cabinets who would take over? That is conspiracy, gentlemen." Minister of Foreign Affairs Mario Lopez also released a statement that Vizcarra's government had prepared to call upon the Organization of American States' Inter-American Democratic Charter if Vizcarra were to be impeached, with the charter stating "when the government of a member state considers that its democratic political institutional process or its legitimate exercise of power is at risk, it may request assistance from the Secretary General or the Permanent Council for the strengthening and preservation of its democratic system".

=== Vote on vacating office ===
On 18 September, Vizcarra gave a speech for twenty minutes after appearing before congress. Following ten hours of deliberation, 32 members of congress supported the motion to remove Vizcarra from the office of the presidency, 78 voted against his removal and 15 abstained from voting, with 87 votes of 130 being required for his removal.

Vote on vacating President Martín Vizcarra in the Congress of the Republic
Ballot	18 September 2020
Absentees: • PP (2); • FA (1); • AP (1); • Independent (1)	5 / 130
Required majority	87 out of 130 (two thirds of the legal number of legislators)
Yes: • FREPAP (15); • UPP (13); • AP (2); • FP (1); • PDSP (1)	32 / 130
No: • APP (21); • AP (21); • FP (14); • PDSP (9); • PM (9); • FA (2); • Independent (2)	78 / 130
Abstentions: • PP (9); • FA (5); • APP (1)	15 / 130

== Reactions ==
In a joint statement released through the Andean Community, presidents Jeanine Áñez of Bolivia, Iván Duque Márquez of Colombia and Lenín Moreno of Ecuador shared "deep concern about the events that take place in Peru, threatening its stability and governance," called for the avoidance of "actions that may jeopardize the legitimate exercise of power and the democratic institutional political process" and urged for "a prompt solution to this situation, based on dialogue, within the framework of the current constitutional order and in strict adherence to the balance of powers".

== See also ==
- Removal of Martín Vizcarra
- First impeachment process against Pedro Pablo Kuczynski
- Second impeachment and resignation of Pedro Pablo Kuczynski
