= Ayacucho massacre =

2022 mass killing by the Peruvian army

- Part of 2022–2023 Peruvian protests
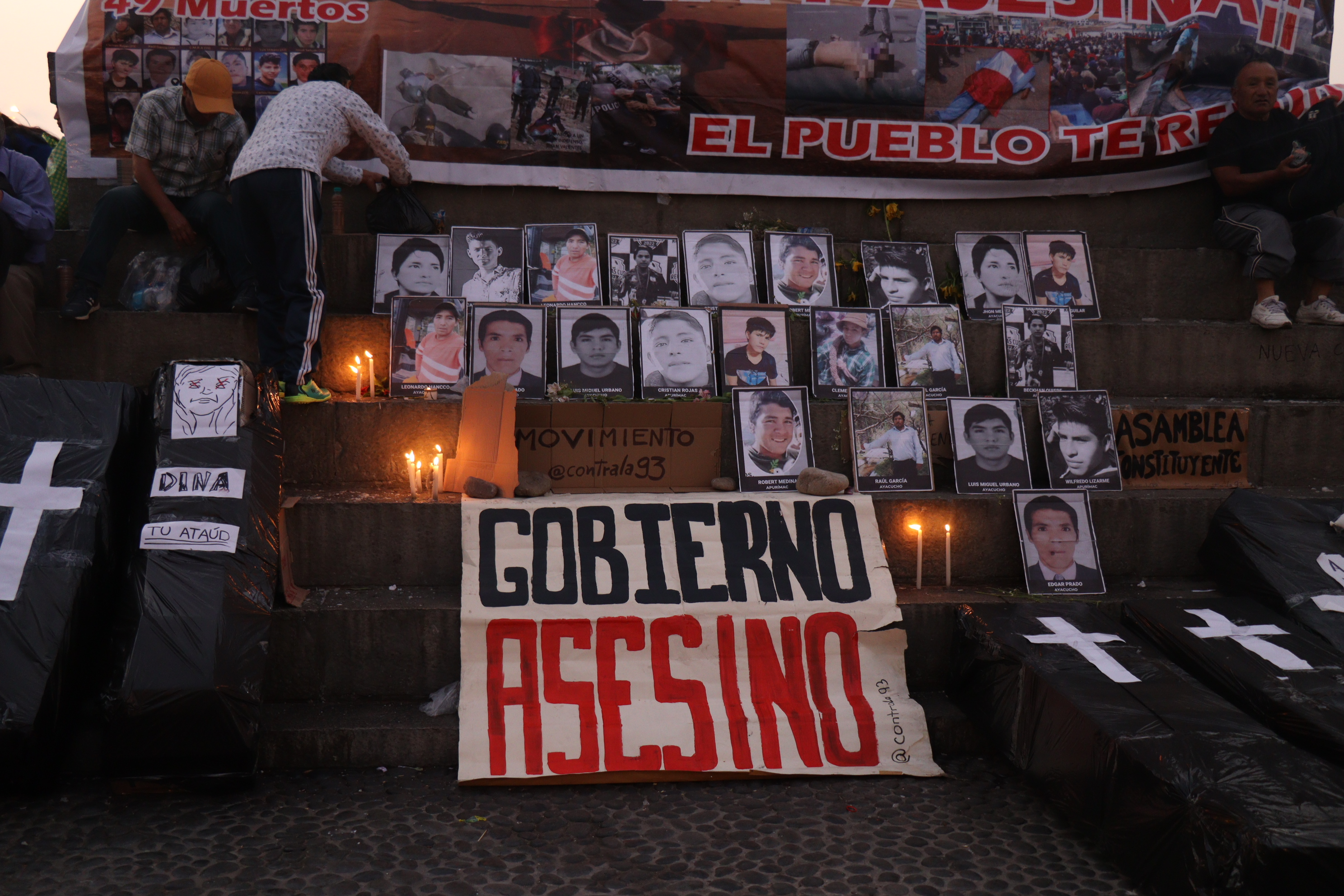
- A vigil at Plaza Manco Cápac, Lima, held for those killed.
- Date: 15 December 2022; 3 years ago
- Location: Ayacucho, Peru; 13°09′47″S 74°13′28″W
- Caused by: Impeachment and arrest of Pedro Castillo after his attempt to dissolve Congress
- Result: Protests suppressed: Dozens killed and wounded; Looting and burning of various unprotected public buildings

Parties
Government of Peru; National Police; Peruvian Armed Forces; Peruvian Army	(Peru) Protestors: Fredepa; FENATEP

Lead figures
Enrique Sampén Díaz; Jaime Díaz Huicho Díaz; Javier Aparicio; Víctor Grados Rivas	Decentralized leadership

Number
218	6,000

Casualties and losses
0 killed; 14 injured	10 killed; 61 injured

The Ayacucho massacre took place on 15 December 2022 in Ayacucho, when Peruvian Army soldiers fired on protestors after an attempt by protestors to storm the local airport. The incident happened in the context of the 2022–2023 Peruvian protests, occurring one day after President Dina Boluarte, with the support of right-wing parties in Congress, granted the Peruvian Armed Forces expanded powers and the ability to respond to demonstrations.

On that day, demonstrations took place in Ayacucho and the situation intensified when the military deployed helicopters to fire at protesters, who later tried to take over the city's airport, which was defended by the Peruvian Army and the National Police of Peru. Troops responded by firing live ammunition at protesters, resulting in 10 dead and 61 injured. Among the injured, 90% had gunshot wounds, while those killed were shot in the head or torso. Nine of the ten killed had wounds consistent with the ammunition used in the IMI Galil service rifle used by the army.

The event was not prominently covered by Western or Peruvian media. Academics and human rights organizations condemned the excessive use of force by Peruvian authorities, while the Minister of Culture and Minister of Education resigned from the newly formed government of Dina Boluarte in response. The Inter-American Commission on Human Rights would describe the killings as a massacre. The following day, the repression by the police and military led to new acts of vandalism, such as looting and burning of various unprotected public buildings. The following month, the Juliaca massacre was perpetrated by the Peruvian National Police.

== Background ==
=== History of Ayacucho ===
Following the independence of Peru from the Spanish Empire, the economic elite focused their power on the coastal regions while the rural provinces were governed by existing serfdom practices by hacienda landowners. The Government of Peru displayed little interference in the public sector throughout the nation's history since Peru frequently experienced commodities booms that benefitted white elites on the coast instead of the indigenous majority in rural areas, with businesses focusing on bringing commodities from inland Peru to export on the coast. The persistence of this model prevented development in Peru, hampered progressivism movements and made the establishment of a national economy impossible. This model essentially continued until 1968 when General Juan Velasco Alvarado took power, leading a dictatorship that increased social spending and removing the power of landowners, which resulted with a power vacuum in the 1970s following his death that saw the rise of communist guerilla group Shining Path.

During the internal conflict in Peru between the government and Shining Path, Ayacucho became a central location of fighting; local residents—many of them indigenous—were often caught in between the feuding groups, and by the end of the conflict, about a third of the total deaths recorded were perpetrated by the Peruvian Armed Forces. This resulted with a distrust of the Peruvian military by residents of Ayacucho due to their treatment. Although economic statistics show improved economic data in Peru in recent decades, the wealth earned between 1990 and 2020 was not distributed throughout the country; living standards showed disparities between the more-developed capital city of Lima and similar coastal regions while rural provinces remained impoverished. The COVID-19 pandemic in Peru exacerbated these disparities, causing many rural Peruvians to feel abandoned by the government as trade and trans-regional travel were prohibited, fueling increased distrust and autonomy among interior regions of the nation. Sociologist Maritza Paredes of the Pontifical Catholic University of Peru stated "people see that all the natural resources are in the countryside but all the benefits are concentrated in Lima."

=== Attempt to dissolve Congress ===
During the presidencies of Ollanta Humala, Pedro Pablo Kuczynski and Martín Vizcarra, the right-wing Congress led by the daughter of the former Peruvian president Alberto Fujimori, Keiko Fujimori, obstructed many of the actions attempted by those presidents. In the 2021 Peruvian general election, Pedro Castillo was elected president of Peru, receiving much of his support from rural areas that believed that the elites in Lima led through corruption. According to historian José Ragas of the Pontifical Catholic University of Chile, although Castillo was accused of being linked to communist terrorism, "in places where terrorism caused the most bloodshed, Castillo won by a lot." In contrast, Fujimori, who was Castillo's contender during the presidential election, received support from Lima's elite, including evangelical Christians, businesses, media organizations, and the armed forces.

During Castillo's presidency, Congress was dominated by right-wing parties opposed to him, with legislators attempting to impeach him multiple times using political avenues. According to broadly-interpreted impeachment wording in the Constitution of Peru, Congress can impeach the president on the vague grounds of "moral incapacity", effectively making the legislature more powerful than the executive branch. On 7 December 2022, Congress was expected to file a motion of censure against Castillo, accusing him of "permanent moral incapacity". Before the legislative body could gather to file its motion, Castillo announced the dissolution of Congress and enacted an immediate curfew. Moments after Castillo's speech, multiple ministers resigned from his government, including Prime Minister Betssy Chávez. The Constitutional Court released a statement: "No one owes obedience to a usurping government and Mr. Pedro Castillo has made an ineffective coup d'état. The Armed Forces are empowered to restore the constitutional order." The Armed Forces also issued a statement rejecting Castillo's actions and called for the maintenance of stability in Peru. Rejecting Castillo's actions to dissolve the legislative body, Congress gathered and voted to remove Castillo from office due to "moral incapacity" with 101 votes in favor, 6 against and 10 abstentions. It was announced that First Vice President Dina Boluarte, who rejected Castillo's actions, would take her oath of office for the presidency at 3:00 pm Peru Time (PET). Boluarte entered the Legislative Palace shortly after 3:00 pm PET and appeared before Congress, where she was later sworn in as president of Peru.

=== Protests ===
For Castillo's supporters, it was the Congress that carried out a coup against the president. In addition, they considered Boluarte a "traitor", "dictator" and "usurper" after her subsequent assumption of the presidency, based on her promise when she was the vice president: "If the president is vacated I will go with the president". For these reasons, supporters of the former president demanded the prompt release of Castillo and called for new elections. The Boluarte government first attempted to quell the protests with increased police presence, and subsequently deployed the military via the declaration of a national state of emergency.

Following the declaration of a national state of emergency, multiple popular groups, including one alliance called the National Assembly of Peoples (ANP) which comprised the General Confederation of Workers of Peru (CGTP), the Sole National Central of Peasant Rounds of Peru (CUNARC) and the National Federation of Workers in Education of Peru (FENATEP), called for a national day of action for 15 December to demonstrate against the Boluarte government.

== Events ==
=== Troops disperse march at town square ===
During protests on 15 December, demonstrations in Ayacucho began peacefully at around 10:00 am, with some police personnel even participating in marches. About 80 troops were equipped with IMI Galil service rifles earlier in the day, according to military documents. In total, some 6,000 protesters took to the streets of Ayacucho according to the regional government, entering the main plaza around 11:00 am. Clashes first began when the Peruvian Army closed access to the main square of Ayacucho at noon and threw red smoke grenades at those participating in the gathering, angering protesters who already had a history of distrust against the military. Helicopters were then deployed by the armed forces while the protests occurred, triggering memories of the internal conflict of the 1980s among Ayacucho citizens. The Peruvian ombudsman reported that a helicopter used by the armed forces dispersed tear gas and fired gunshots at protesters and according to local ombudsman official David Pacheco-Villar, troops began to act with a "disproportionate use of force" against civilians.

=== Protesters enter airport ===
After being blocked by the army near the main square, hundreds of demonstrators approached the Coronel FAP Alfredo Mendívil Duarte Airport, where the Peruvian Armed Forces were staging their actions, with troops closing the airport in response and confronting protesters shortly after. By 12:38 pm, a group of about 200 protesters approached a patrol of 30 Peruvian National Police (PNP) officers and 38 army troops. Shortly after, about 100 to 150 individuals entered the southernmost part of the airport through a nearby cemetery and began to demonstrate on the runway. Some protesters were seen with slingshots and used stones to repel authorities from reaching them. To the west, near Zona Arqueológica de Conchopata, another group of protesters was seen attempting to enter the airport while throwing stones at authorities.

=== Army opens fire on protesters ===
- Videoanalysis from IDL-Reporteros on YouTube
- Peruvian Army firing live ammunition at protesters in Ayacucho
- Protesters fleeing from troops firing their weapons
- A protester shot by troops being evacuated from the scene

Around 2:00 pm, authorities began firing tear gas at protesters on the west side of the airport until over a dozen soldiers were seen approaching the protesters with their IMI Galil rifles drawn. At 2:05 pm, the army began to fire upon protesters, with Leonardo Hancco being struck in the chest by a round fired; he died the next day from the gunshot wound. Human rights groups and citizens of Ayacucho reported that members of the Peruvian Army were then seen chasing protesters into residential streets and shooting directly at civilians with their rifles, describing the event as a massacre. According to El País, "The massacre took place around the Alfredo Mendívil Duarte airport. As can be seen in videos broadcast by neighbors, not all the military shot in the air. Proof of this are the seven dead and 52 injured", with the newspaper reporting that the label of terruco was placed upon protesters to delegitimize their actions.

At 3:14 pm, a group of 30 soldiers were seen chasing protesters near a Primax gas station on Ejercito Avenue and firing towards Amancaes Extension road, shooting 22-year-old Clemer Rojas in the chest. As fellow protesters tried to carry Rojas away at 3:23 pm, troops fired at them, forcing the individuals to leave Rojas in the street. As soldiers approached, they could be seen walking over the dead body of Rojas. Josué Sañudo, who was messaging his father on WhatsApp, was shot on Amancaes Extension road at 3:28 pm, receiving a wound to his neck and dying minutes later. Confrontations with protesters at the airport would continue at this time until individuals were expelled from the vicinity of the airport around 5:00 pm.

Despite clearing the airport, troops were seen firing dozens of rounds at individuals seeking cover in a park into the evening. At 5:54 pm, 51-year-old Edgar Prado was seen on video being shot in the chest by troops while trying to assist an injured protester. Christofer Michael Ramos Aime, 15, was killed around 6:35 pm after being shot in the back while attempting to cross the street; the bullet tore through his right scapula and exited his left arm. Moments later, 20-year-old José Luis Aguilar Yucra—whose great-grandmother was killed by Shining Path and great uncle forcibly disappeared by Peruvian troops during the internal conflict in the 1980s—tried to take shelter from military gunfire he encountered while returning home from work, but was shot in the head and killed; he had not participated in the protests. After hearing initial reports of civilians being killed by the armed forces, protesters set fire to a local Public Ministry building in the area.

=== Health system overwhelmed ===
Casualties were sent for treatment at the Huamanga Network and in the Ayacucho Regional Hospital, with 90% of injuries resulting from gunshot wounds according to the Ayacucho regional health system. By 11:30 pm, a "red alert" was declared by health authorities in the region, requiring healthcare personnel to remain at treatment centers to care for the wounded. The violent response by authorities caused the collapse of hospital systems in the city, with protesters suffering from gunshot wounds being treated in makeshift triage units, with the regional health system stating, "In view of the admission of more injured, tents were expanded and enabled the care and observation of patients, in order to guarantee their care". The Regional Directorate of Health of Ayacucho initially reported that 4 individuals had been killed; they would later revise their numbers, saying that 10 were killed and 61 were injured.

== Aftermath ==
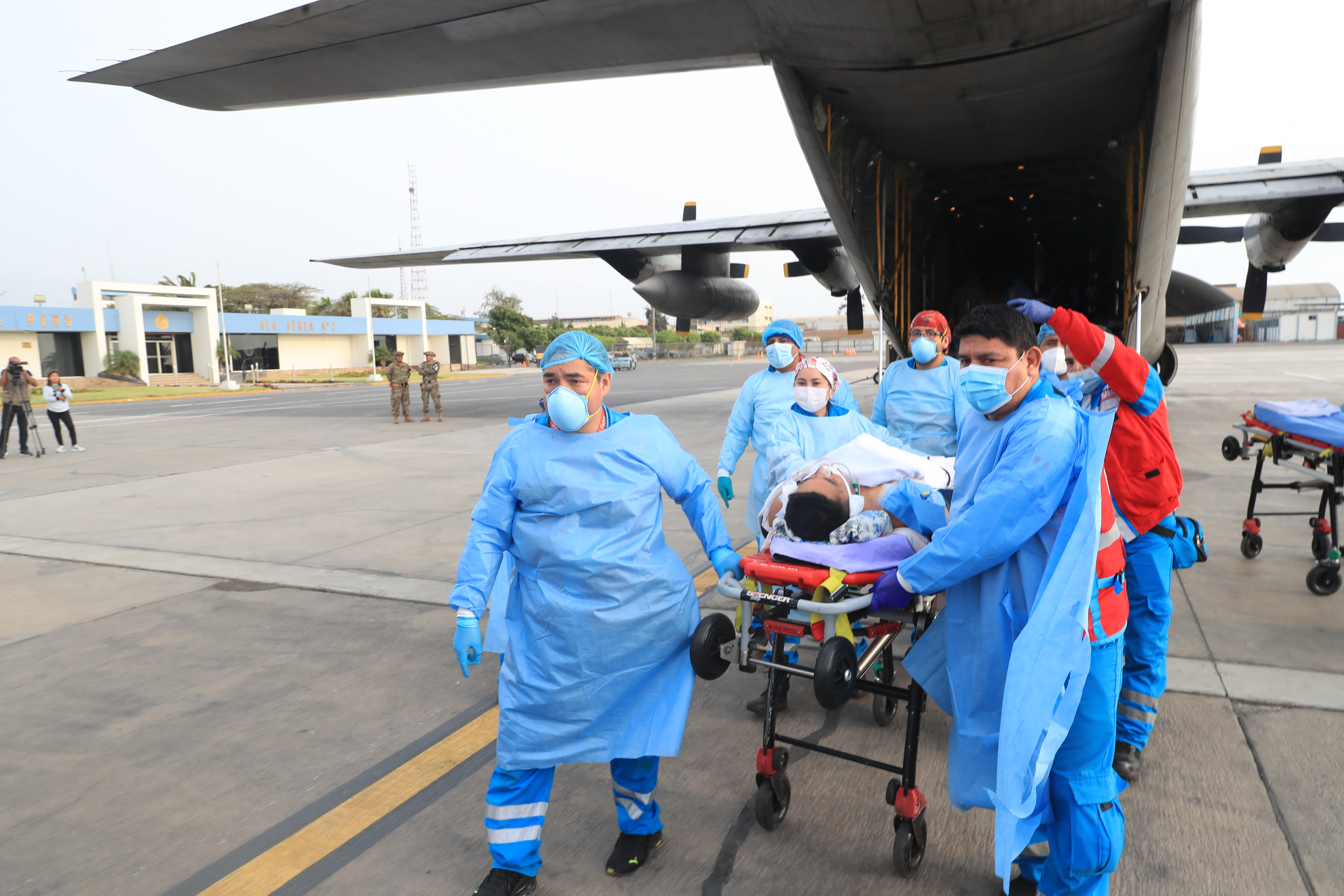
Peruvian Air Force evacuating a victim in Lima on 17 December 2022

Citizens of Ayacucho responded to the massacre with a cacerolazo at midnight into the morning of 16 December, banging pots in protest of the army. Later on 16 December, the regional health system asked for military flights to transport critically injured patients to Lima. In the town square, a banner with a black ribbon was raised stating "15 December. Day of the massacre".

=== Investigations ===
Forensic evidence and footage captured surrounding the events resulted with the Directorate of Criminalistics determining that of the ten individuals killed, nine died from gunshot wounds consistent with 5.56×45mm NATO rounds fired from the IMI Galil service rifles used by the army.

The founder of the Peruvian Forensic Anthropology Team (EPAF), forensic anthropologist Carmen Rosa Cardoza, analysed evidence surrounding those who were killed, saying that the military was shooting to kill and that the gunshot wounds in the head and torso were consistent with wounds suffered during human rights violations, explaining that wounds during an armed conflict are usually found on the extremities. Gloria Cano, attorney for the Association for Human Rights (Aprodeh) who analyzed human rights abuses during the internal conflict in Peru, stated "we see a pattern of injuries in vital areas, which are the abdomen, chest and head ... The military receive courses and do shooting practices with the figure of a humanoid. They teach them how to shoot vital areas: chest and head. This happens because the Army is made for war. That's why they shot to kill". Cano also stated that officers likely ordered troops to simply "eliminate the enemy" and did not specify actions to take against protesters, with the attorney saying officers "had to explain to them that in case of need they had to shoot into the air, to the ground. If they take them out without giving them specific orders, they will do what they learn, which is to shoot the vital segments of the human body".

Investigations were opened against leaders of the Peruvian armed forces responsible for troops involved, with prosecutor Karen Obregón Ubaldo of the Second Supraprovincial Criminal Prosecutor's Office Specialized in Human Rights of Ayacucho reporting that General Antero Mejía Escajadillo of the PNP Region of Ayacucho and General Jesús Vera Ipenza, general commander of the Second Military Infantry Brigade of Ayacucho, had been responsible for "law enforcement using lethal weapons" against protesters. Despite the Inter-American Commission on Human Rights suggesting that human rights violations be investigated by civilian courts, the Boluarte government on 18 December began the process of a military tribunal overseeing investigations of the military actions in Ayacucho. The same day, the Peruvian Armed Forces held a press conference where they did not make any statements about the deceased, instead saying that "bad Peruvians" clashed with authorities.

A report from IDL-Reporteros published on February 12, called "Ayacucho: Radiografía de homicidios", argued that at least six of the fatalities were caused by shots fired by troops without any justifications. The outlet argued that these killings thus represent human rights violations.

An investigation by The New York Times noted that authorities violated their own protocols and intentionally used lethal force when firing assault rifles at fleeing protesters. The newspaper noted: "[Protesters] were unarmed and, as stipulated in military protocols, posed no 'imminent danger of death or grave bodily harm,' to officers or anyone else when they were shot".

In June 2023, IDL-Reporteros reported that the company operating the Coronel FAP Alfredo Mendívil Duarte Airport, Aeropuertos Andinos del Perú, said that it deleted video footage of the incident and was not asked by government investigators to provide any images.

== Responses ==
=== Academics and human rights groups ===
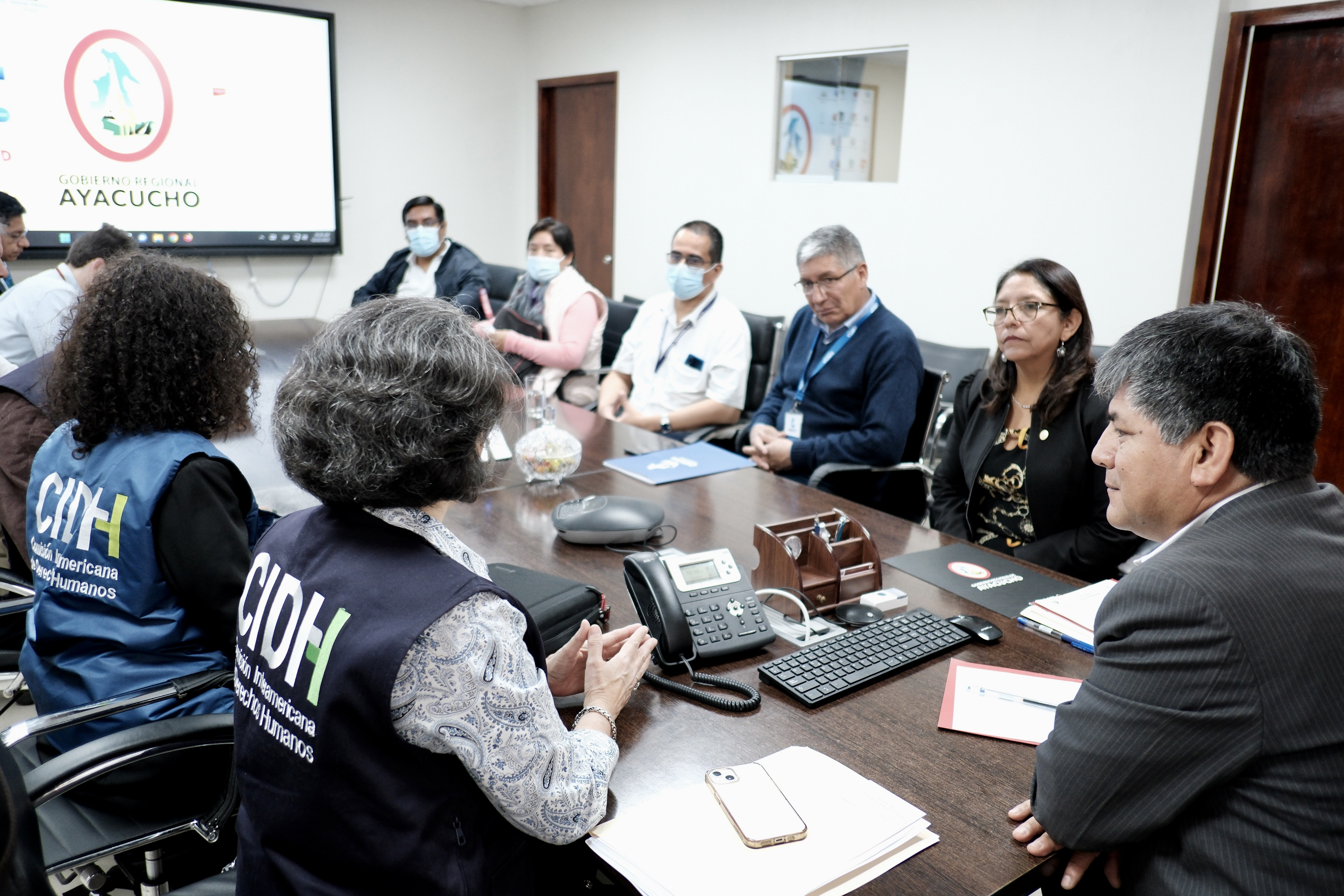
IACHR representatives meeting with members of the Regional Government of Ayacucho.

The Inter-American Commission on Human Rights condemned the killings, stating, "Acts that, when perpetrated by State agents, could constitute extrajudicial executions, extremes that must be investigated by prosecutors specialized in human rights. ... [G]iven the circumstances of mode, time and place, they could be described as a massacre".

The Coordinadora Nacional de Derechos Humanos (CNDDHH) condemned the use of "weapons of war" against protestors, with the NGO sharing a video of authorities using automatic firearms against demonstrators. The National Association of Journalists of Peru denounced the actions of the Peruvian military, stating, "[W]e express dismay at the death of 7 compatriots in Ayacucho. We deplore the actions of the armed forces in this context, we express solidarity with the Ayacucho people who suffered decades of horror, and we demand that responsibilities be identified".

Human Rights Watch criticized the use of the military in Ayacucho, stating, "The deployment of the armed forces to maintain public order raises particular concerns, as they do not have the equipment, training, or mission to carry out those tasks. Videos shared on local news outlets and social media – reviewed and verified by Human Rights Watch – show military personnel apparently firing assault rifles in the streets near the Ayacucho airport".

In an interview with Democracy Now!, human rights expert and sociologist Eduardo González Cueva of The New School stated, "What's going on is a massacre. This is what is happening right now in Peru. On the one side, you have a massacre caused by the indolence of social elites in this country, who believe that the life of a campesino is worth less than any other. ... But what is clear to me is that with the massacre that has been committed, the current government led by Mrs. Boluarte has lost all legitimacy."

A group of 300 intellectuals and writers condemned the violence, writing, "The National Police of Peru, an institution that has exercised the same repressive protocols against civilians since the 1980s, acts with impunity against fundamental rights, with special cruelty against demonstrators from vulnerable sectors, the Andes and the Amazon" and rejected groups ignoring vulnerable citizens, stating, "The State and corporate and media powers actively ignore the pronouncements of peasant communities, indigenous territorial governments, regional governments, organizations and social groups throughout the country, seeking to impose themselves by force with a reprehensible racism, classism and centralism."

=== Officials ===
==== National ====
The ombudsman of Peru stated, "A massacre occurred yesterday afternoon in Huamanga, it is not a politically correct decision". The Minister of Education and Minister of Culture, recently named by the Boluarte government, announced their resignations following the killings.

Boluarte expressed condolences for the massacre, stating, "We mourn the crying of the mothers in Ayacucho and we suffer the pain of families throughout the country. Today, in a sad day of violence, we again mourn the death of Peruvians. My deep condolences to the bereaved. I reiterate my call for peace." She defended authorities who performed the killings, saying that they had obeyed regulations, instead blaming the deaths on unknown violent individuals.

The military responded to the incident, saying they were attacked with firearms, though The New York Times reported that no evidence was provided and that firearms were not observed "in the hundreds of images and other materials examined".

==== Local ====
The Government of Ayacucho responded, blaming the Boluarte government for the massacre, demanding that the president and her ministers "must immediately resign from their positions" and stated, "We demand the immediate cessation of the use of firearms and repression by the Armed Forces and the Peruvian National Police against our population, we condemn any act of vandalism." Governor of Ayacucho Carlos Rua also criticized the state of emergency and curfew, saying "We have to be very careful with the issuance of this type of decrees that, in the end, will generate more deaths", while also saying the army was responsible for the deaths in Ayacucho.

Congressman Alex Flores of Peru Libre filed a constitutional complaint to the Subcommittee on Constitutional Accusations against Minister of Defense Alberto Otárola and Minister of the Interior César Cervantes regarding the actions of the Peruvian army in Ayacucho.

=== Others ===
Former president of Bolivia Evo Morales condemned the violence in Ayacucho, stating, "We join the cry of defenders of life and Human Rights to demand that they stop the massacre of our indigenous brothers in Peru who demand respect for their vote and a democracy that represents them. No government staining its hands with the blood of the people is legitimate."

== See also ==
- Human rights in Peru
- List of massacres in Peru
- Sacaba massacre
- The Mouth of the Wolf (1988 film)
