= National Federation of Workers in Education of Peru =

- Federación Nacional de Trabajadores en la Educación del Perú - FENATEP
- Formation: 2017; 9 years ago
- Type: Teachers labor union
- Region served: Peru
- Key people: Pedro Castillo

The National Federation of Workers in Education of Peru (Spanish: Federación Nacional de Trabajadores en la Educación del Perú - FENATEP) is a labor union for teachers in Peru.

== History ==
FENATEP was founded by Pedro Castillo, Segundo Vásquez González and Brangil Juan Mateo Blas in 2017. Castillo became a teachers' union leader during the 2017 Peru teachers' strike, which sought to increase salaries, pay off local government debt, repeal the Law of the Public Teacher Career and increase the education budget. At the time, the Peruvian government sought to replace a system of career teachers with temporary unskilled educators. In an interview with the Associated Press, Castillo said that his motivation for entering politics was seeing his students arrive to school hungry without any benefits while, at the same time, Peru experienced economic growth from mineral wealth.

The media in Peru attempted to link Pedro Castillo to the Shining Path through his participation with FENATEP during his tenure as President of Peru, though The Guardian described links to Shining Path as "incorrect", and the Associated Press said that allegations by Peruvian media of links to Shining Path were "unsupported".

During the Peruvian protests following the 2022 Peruvian political crisis, FENATEP allied with rondas campesinas of the Sole National Central of Peasant Rounds of Peru to demonstrate against the government of Dina Boluarte.

== See also ==
- Confederación General de Trabajadores del Perú
