= Peruvian protests (2022–2023) =

Protests against the government of Dina Boluarte and Fujimorism

- Part of the 2016–present Peruvian political crisis
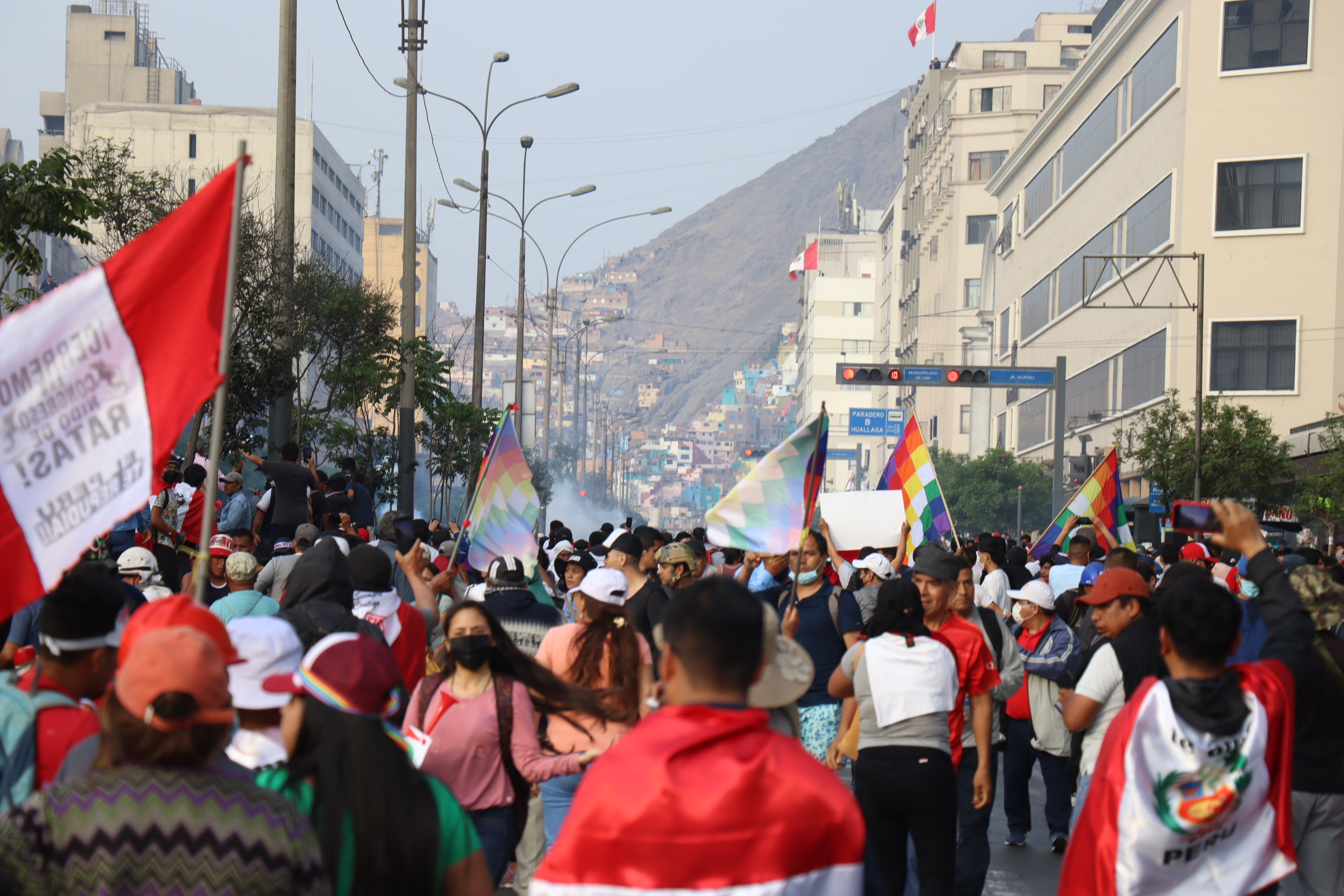
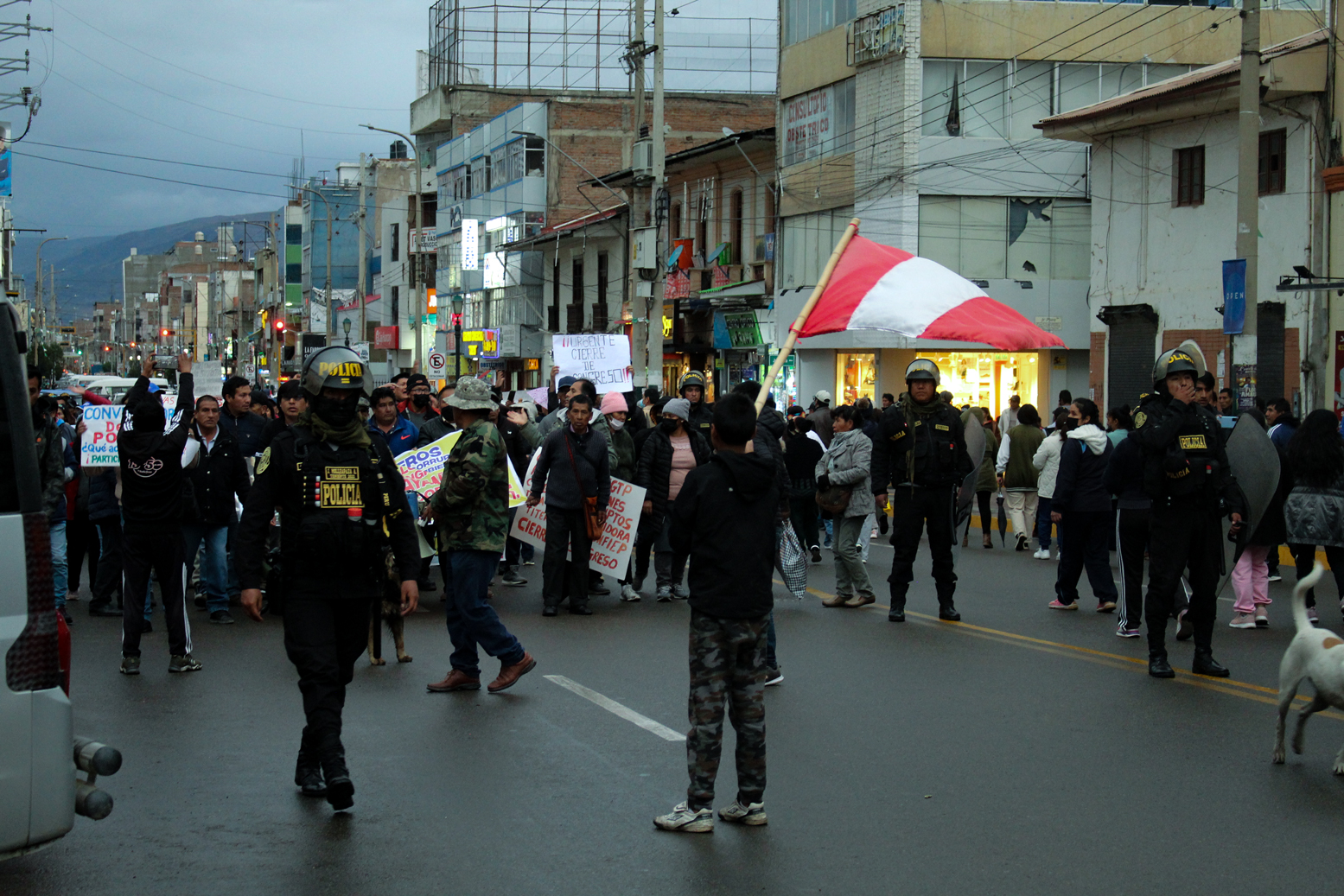
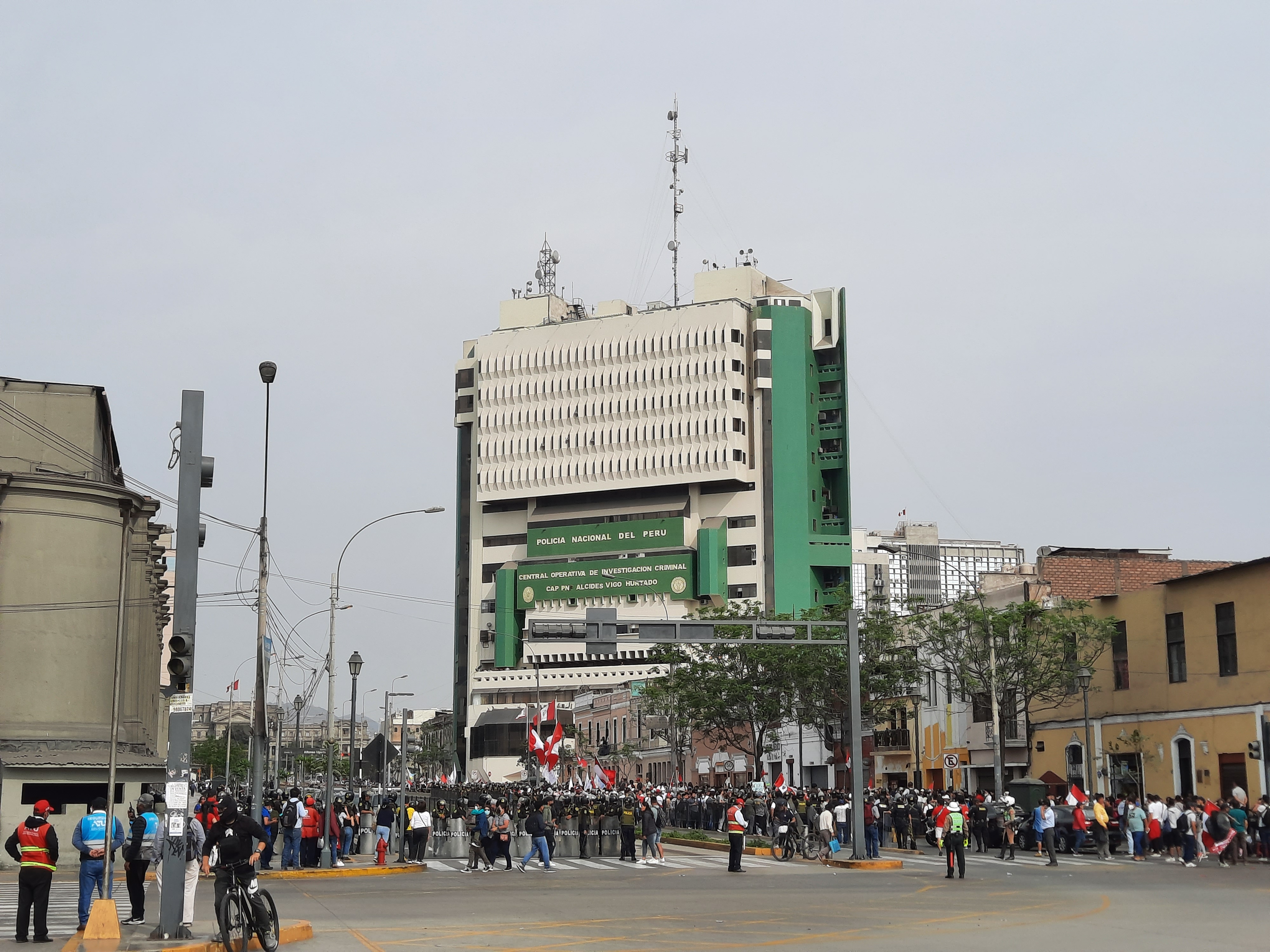
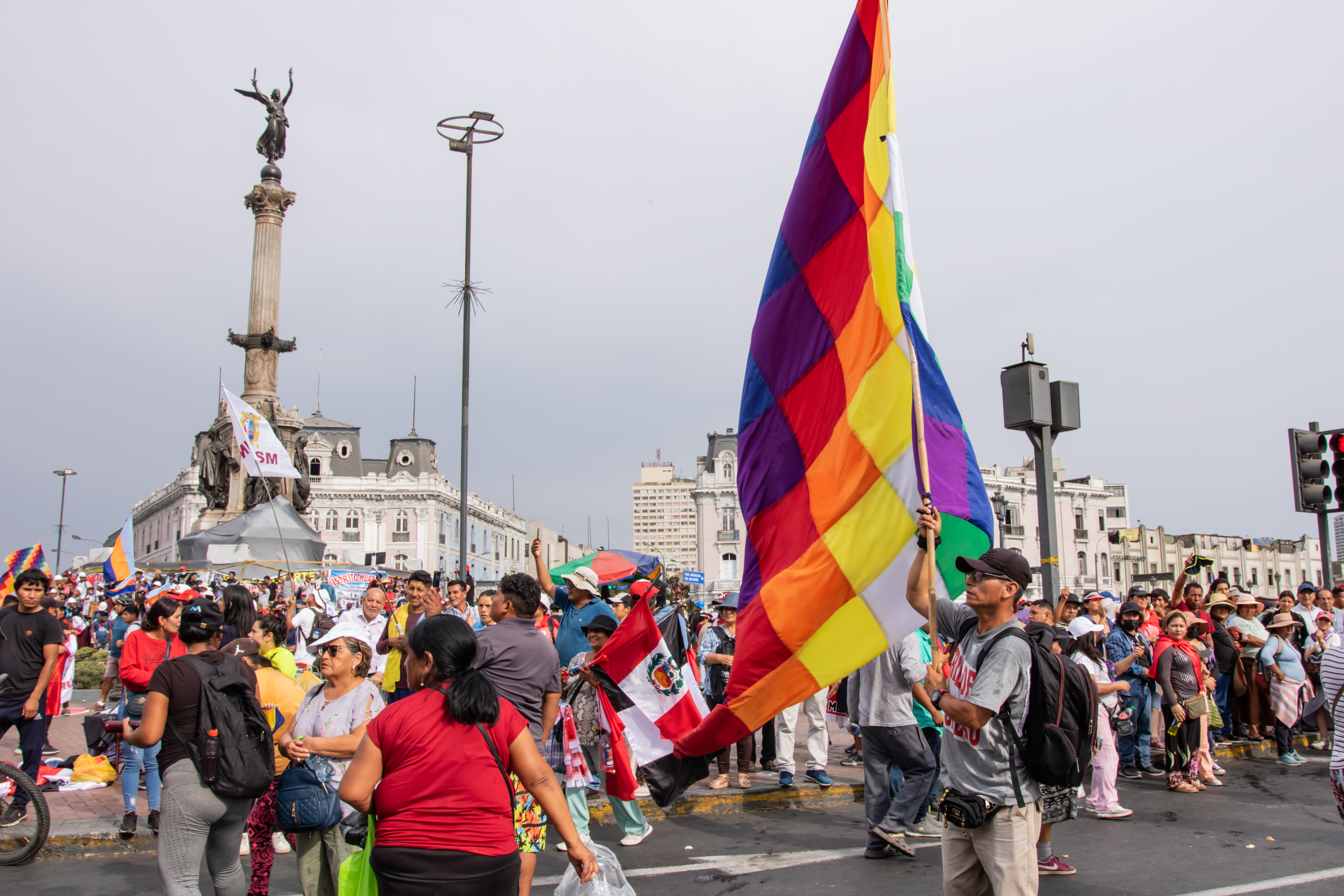
- Top to bottom, left to right: Protesters in Lima draped with Peruvian flags and waving Wiphalas on 12 December, demonstrations in Huancayo on 9 December, protests outside where Castillo was detained at la Prefectura on 7 December, protester waving a Wiphala flag in Plaza Dos de Mayo on 4 February 2023
- Date: 7 December 2022 – 24 March 2023
- Location: Peru
- Caused by: Congress obstructing presidential actions since 2016; Impeachment and arrest of Pedro Castillo after his attempt to dissolve Congress; Centralismo exploiting rural regions
- Goals: Resignation of President Dina Boluarte and Government of Peru; Dissolution of Congress; Establishment of constituent assembly; New general election; Release of Pedro Castillo
- Methods: Protests, blockades, demonstrations, civil disobedience, civil resistance, strike action, riots, looting, insurgency
- Result: Economic losses due to stoppages of road and industrial infrastructure; Resignation of ministers from Boluarte's cabinet after the Ayacucho and Juliaca massacres; Defense minister Alberto Otárola made prime minister; Congress consolidates power; Supreme Court of Peru declares all protests illegal

Parties
Anti-government protestors List: National Assembly of the Peoples; Agrarian and Rural Front of Peru; Central Única Nacional de Rondas Campesinas; AIDESEP; ONAMIAP; National Front of Carriers and Drivers of Peru; Ayacucho People's Defense Front; Departmental Federation of Cusco Workers (FDTC); Túpac Amaru Cusco Agrarian Revolutionary Federation (FARTAC); Cusco University Federation (FUC); SUTEP; Cusco Regional Youth Assembly (Arejo); CGTP; CUT; Supported by: Free Peru; Together for Peru; New Peru; PCP; PHP; Peru First; Democratic Peru; Bicentennial Peru; BMCN; Broad Front; MOVADEF; Red Fatherland; Ethnocacerists; ANTAURO; Union for Peru; PCP (Marxist–Leninist)	Government of Peru; Congress; Constitutional Court; Supreme Court; Joint Command; Armed Forces; National Police; Supported by: Popular Force; Popular Renewal; Advance Country; Alliance for Progress; PPC; Peru Secure Homeland; La Resistencia; National Society of Mining, Oil and Energy (SNMPE)

Lead figures
Decentralized leadership (various social leaders)	Dina Boluarte; Alberto Otárola; Pedro Angulo (until 21 December 2022); José Williams

Number
Tens of thousands; 90,000 ronderos	

Casualties
- Deaths: 69 civilians 1 officer 6 soldiers
- Injuries: 1,881
- Arrested: 608

After President of Peru Pedro Castillo was ousted on 7 December 2022, a series of political protests against the government of President Dina Boluarte and the Congress of Peru occurred. The demonstrations lacked centralized leadership and originated primarily among grassroots movements and social organizations on the left to far-left, as well as indigenous communities, who felt politically disenfranchised. Castillo was removed from office and arrested after announcing the illegal dissolution of Congress, the intervention of the state apparatus, and the forced establishment of an "emergency government", which was characterized as a self-coup attempt by all government institutions, all professional institutions, and mainstream media in Peru (and by the international community in general). Castillo's supporters said that Congress attempted to overthrow Castillo.

Boluarte, along with Congress, had been widely disapproved of by voters, with the two receiving the lowest approval ratings among public offices in the Americas. Among the demonstrators' main demands were the dissolution of Congress, Boluarte's resignation, new general elections, Castillo's release, and the formation of a constituent assembly to draft a new constitution. It was also reported that some of the protesters declared an insurgency in Puno. Analysts, businesses, and voters said immediate elections were necessary to prevent future unrest, although many establishment political parties had little public support.

The Boluarte government called the protests a "threat to democracy" and announced a national state of emergency on 14 December, suspending some constitutional rights of citizens, including the right to prevent troops from staying in private homes and buildings, the right to freedom of movement, the right to freedom of assembly, and the right to "personal freedom and security" for 30 days. The Peruvian Armed Forces and National Police used severe force against the protesters, resulting in at least 60 deaths, over 600 injuries, over 380 arrests and two massacres, in Ayacucho and Juliaca. Extrajudicial executions use of torture and violence against detainees were also reported. The government denied that authorities acted violently and praised officers and troops for their actions.

Some right-wing groups and the Boluarte government used the terruqueo fear-mongering tactic to label some of the protesters as terrorists, a practice dating to the internal conflict in Peru that United Nations experts have condemned. United Nations Special Rapporteur Clément Nyaletsossi Voule said there was no evidence that terrorist groups were involved in the protests. Terruqueos by government officials provided impunity to authorities and increased the risk of violence. Human rights organizations criticized the response of the Boluarte government and authorities and the use of the Armed Forces in responding to the protests due to the history of troops killing protesters with impunity.

Multiple ministers resigned from Boluarte's cabinet during the protests, following acts of violence perpetrated by authorities. Since at least December 2022, opposition protesters had chanted the slogan "Dina asesina" ("Dina the murderer") and sung a song of the same name. The Attorney general of Peru, Patricia Benavides, announced investigations on 10 January 2023 for the alleged crimes of genocide, aggravated homicide, and serious injuries against Boluarte, Prime Minister Alberto Otárola, Interior minister Víctor Rojas, and Defence minister Jorge Chávez.

Coverage of the protests by the media in Peru was also criticized by most Peruvians, who believed media organizations were biased against them. The massacres that authorities perpetrated against the majority-indigenous populations in southern Peru were not covered by national media. The Inter-American Commission on Human Rights condemned violent acts carried out by some demonstrators against media personnel. Violent far-right protesters, such as La Resistencia, also attacked investigative media outlets critical of the government. Pro-Castillo protesters tried to attack points such as Coronel FAP Alfredo Mendívil Duarte Airport, which led to clashes between civilians and the military.

Fujimorism ultimately consolidated governmental power into Congress with the assistance of the Constitutional Court of Peru. Most institutions, including all branches of government and the media, adopted authoritarian practices during the protests. The politicization of the armed forces raised concern about a developing military junta. Congress, with one-third of its members belonging to a far-right bloc, rejected all attempts at reform, including new elections, constitutional proposals, and motions to impeach Boluarte. On 9 March 2023, the state of emergency in Lima was lifted as protests waned, and the Supreme Court of Peru ruled on 18 May that protesting was illegal and not protected by the constitution. Calls for more protests in July were made after the controversial ruling.

== Background ==
=== Centralismo ===
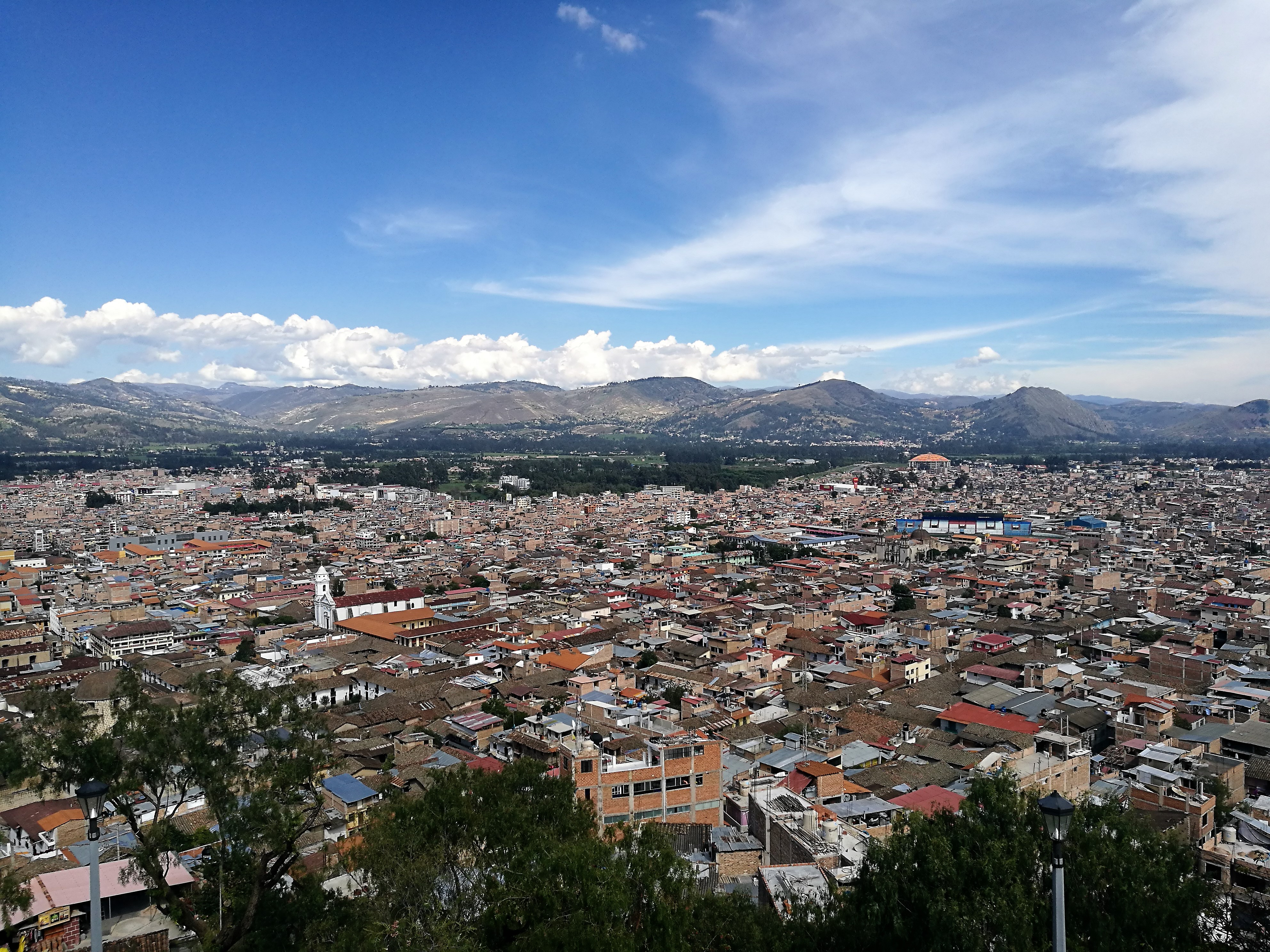
Cajamarca, one of Peru's poorest cities located near the world's fourth largest gold mine

Since the independence of Peru from the Spanish Empire, the economic elite in Lima engaged in a practice known as centralismo, which involved focusing their power on the coastal regions while the rural provinces were governed by existing serfdom practices by hacienda landowners. This practice has continued throughout Peru's history and has resulted with large levels of economic inequality, political alienation and other disparities in rural regions, with Lima acquiring the majority of socioeconomic benefits in the nation. Centralismo also contributed to systemic racism in Peru since the wealth and education centralized in Lima created a perception amongst Limeños that rural indigenous individuals were inferior.

As globalization intensified through the twentieth century, the gap between urban and rural areas increased, with larger cities increasing their ability to connect to the economy and increasing their wealth while smaller cities experienced resource and human capital flight towards the larger cities. Many Peruvians living in rural areas could not vote until 1979 when the constitution allowed illiterate individuals to vote. Despite this, between 1919 and 2021, eleven of eighteen democratically elected presidents of Peru were from Lima. Wealth generated between 1990 and 2020 was not equally distributed throughout the country. As a result, there were significant disparities in living standards between the more-developed capital city of Lima and similar coastal regions, while rural provinces remained impoverished. By the 2020s, the existing disparities in Peru caused a "globalization fatigue" according to Asensio, resulting in a polarization between rural and urban areas that saw differing priorities with lifestyle, economics and politics. This divide created by centralismo would be a contributing factor to the protests.

=== Obstructive Congress ===
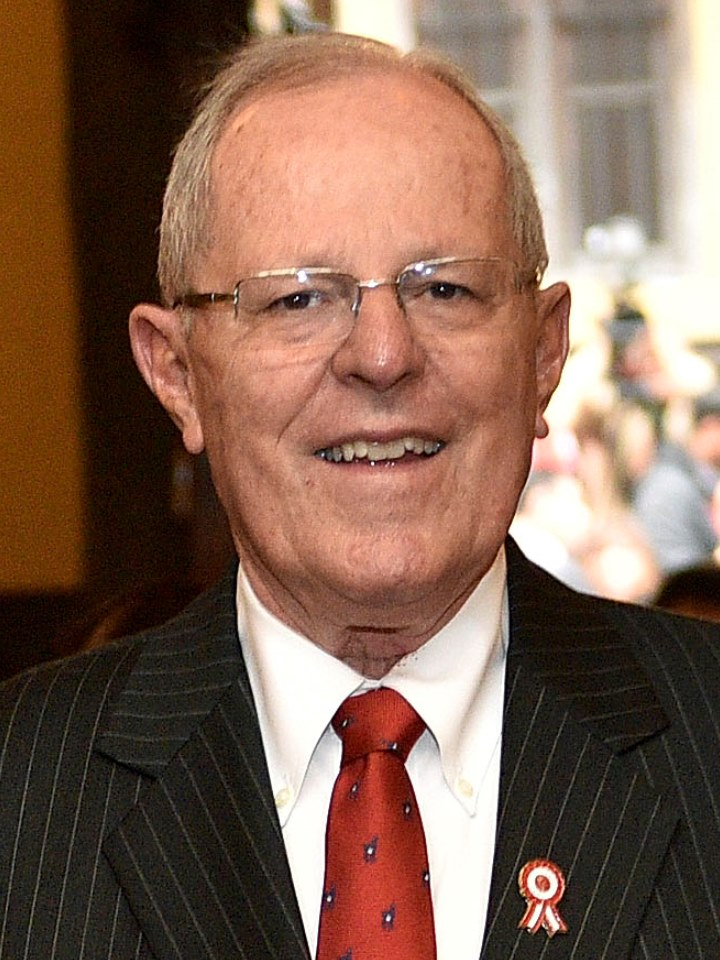
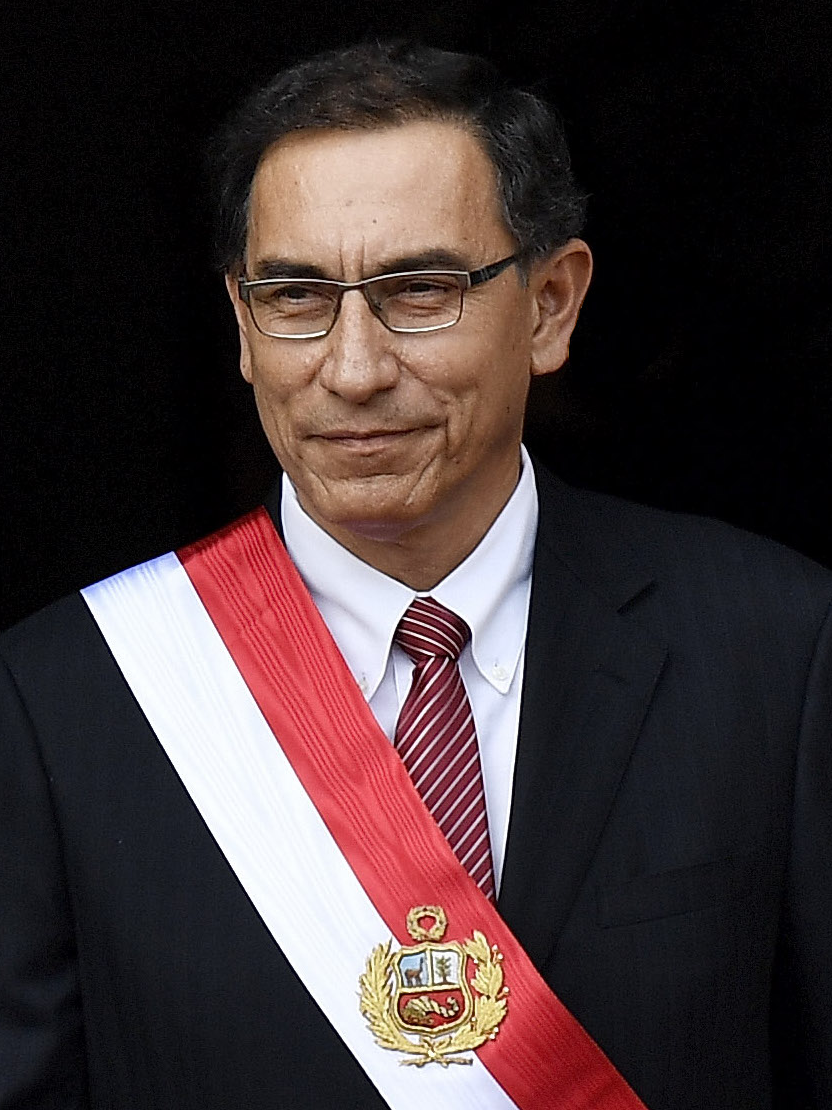
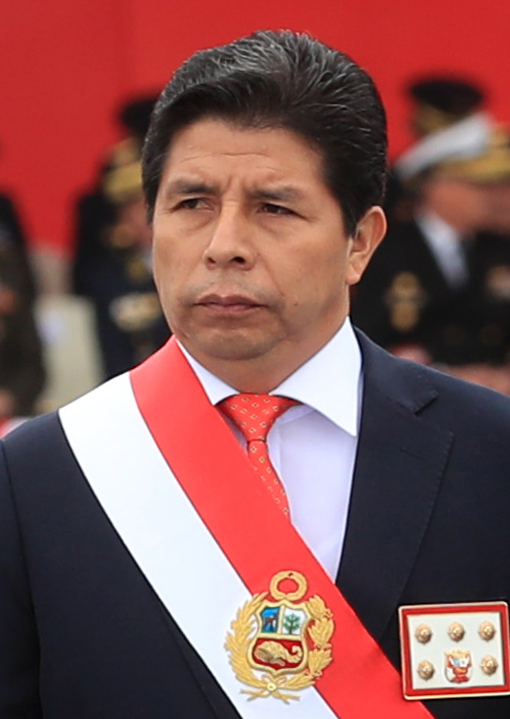
Presidents Pedro Pablo Kuczynski, Martín Vizcarra and Pedro Castillo (left to right) were impeached and targeted for removal by the opposing Congress

During the presidencies of Ollanta Humala, Pedro Pablo Kuczynski and Martín Vizcarra, the right-wing Congress led by the daughter of the former Peruvian president Alberto Fujimori, Keiko Fujimori, obstructed many of the presidents' actions. The political legacy of the Fujimori family was assumed by Keiko after her father Alberto, who instituted Plan Verde and oversaw the Grupo Colina death squad during the internal conflict in Peru, was sentenced to prison for human rights abuses. During their majority in congress, Fujimorists "earned a reputation as hardline obstructionists for blocking initiatives popular with Peruvians aimed at curbing the nation’s rampant corruption" according to the Associated Press. According to Walter Albán, head of Transparency International Peru, Congress has been infiltrated by criminal groups that obstruct reforms to maintain their status and parliamentary immunity, while Human Rights Watch said that Congress was more focused on personal gain and vote trading instead of issues facing the nation.

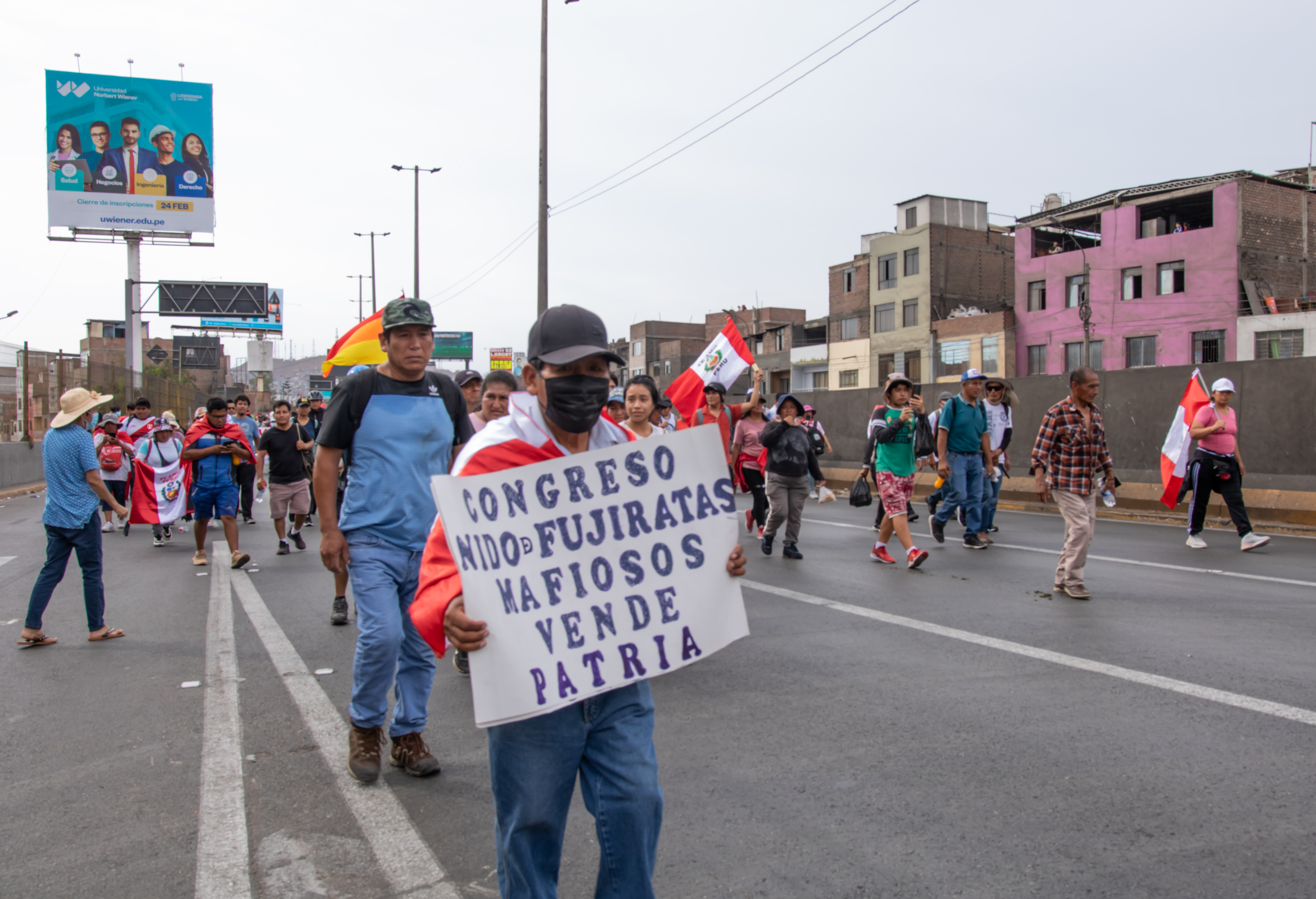
Protester holding a sign that states "Congress, nest of mafioso Fuji-rats sells homeland"

President Humala would go on to serve a weak presidency due to the obstructionist practices of the Congress. After losing the 2016 presidential election to Kuczynski, Keiko Fujimori led her party Popular Force in the unicameral Congress, with the right-wing legislators obstructing efforts by President Kuczynski. After experiencing obstruction by Congress and various scandals, President Kuczynski resigned from the presidency. Martín Vizcarra, Kuczynski's first vice president, then assumed office in March 2018. Amid the COVID-19 pandemic in Peru, President Vizcarra was impeached in September 2020 and a month later removed from office. Thousands of citizens then protested against Vizcarra's impeachment.

President of Congress, Manuel Merino, faced criticism regarding how he hastily pushed for impeachment proceedings against Vizcarra, especially since he would assume the presidency upon Vizcarra's removal. Renowned reporter Gustavo Gorriti reported on 12 September 2020 that Merino had contacted the Commanding General of the Peruvian Navy, Fernando Cerdán, notifying him that he would attempt to impeach Vizcarra and assume the presidency. Minister of Defense Jorge Chávez confirmed that Merino had tried to establish support with the military. President Merino would resign after five days due to mass disapproval.

Francisco Sagasti was made President of Congress on 16 November and thus succeeded Merino as president on 17 November per the presidential line of succession, since both vice presidential positions were vacated by Vizcarra in 2018 and Mercedes Aráoz in May 2020.

=== Castillo presidency ===
The election will be flipped, dear friends.

— Keiko Fujimori

Sagasti served as president until Castillo was elected in the 2021 general election, with Fujimori losing her third consecutive presidential bid. The 2021 election saw many right-wing candidates, with business groups, political parties and the majority of media organizations in Peru collaborating with Fujimori's campaign by appealing to fear when discussing political opponents. Some broadcast television channels openly supported Fujimori's candidacy as well. Reuters wrote that El Comercio, one of the largest media organizations in South America, "has generally backed Fujimori". Fujimori received support from Lima's elite, evangelical Christians, businesses, media organizations, and the armed forces. A large far-right bloc in Congress was also elected, comprising one-third of the legislature's seats.

In contrast, Castillo was supported by working class and indigenous Peruvians who were affected by centralismo, with Castillo receiving support in areas outside of Lima and other large cities. In May 2021, Americas Quarterly wrote: "Life expectancy in Huancavelica, for example, the region where Castillo received his highest share of the vote in the first round, is seven years shorter than in Lima. In Puno, where Castillo received over 47% of the vote, the infant mortality rate is almost three times that of Lima's." Then-professor of Public Policy Gonzalo Banda stated that although Castillo was accused of being linked to communist terrorism, "in places where terrorism caused the most bloodshed, Castillo won by a lot." Asensio writes that Castillo, being recognized as a "true Peruvian" by his supporters, was able to establish support by saying he would reverse the favoritism of Lima and defending regional rights.

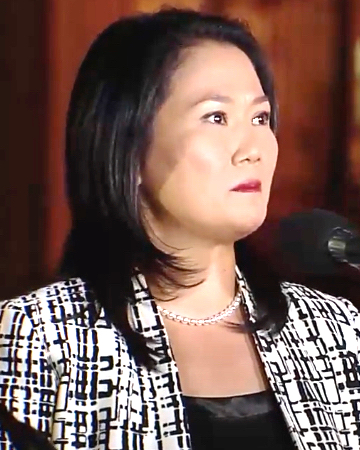
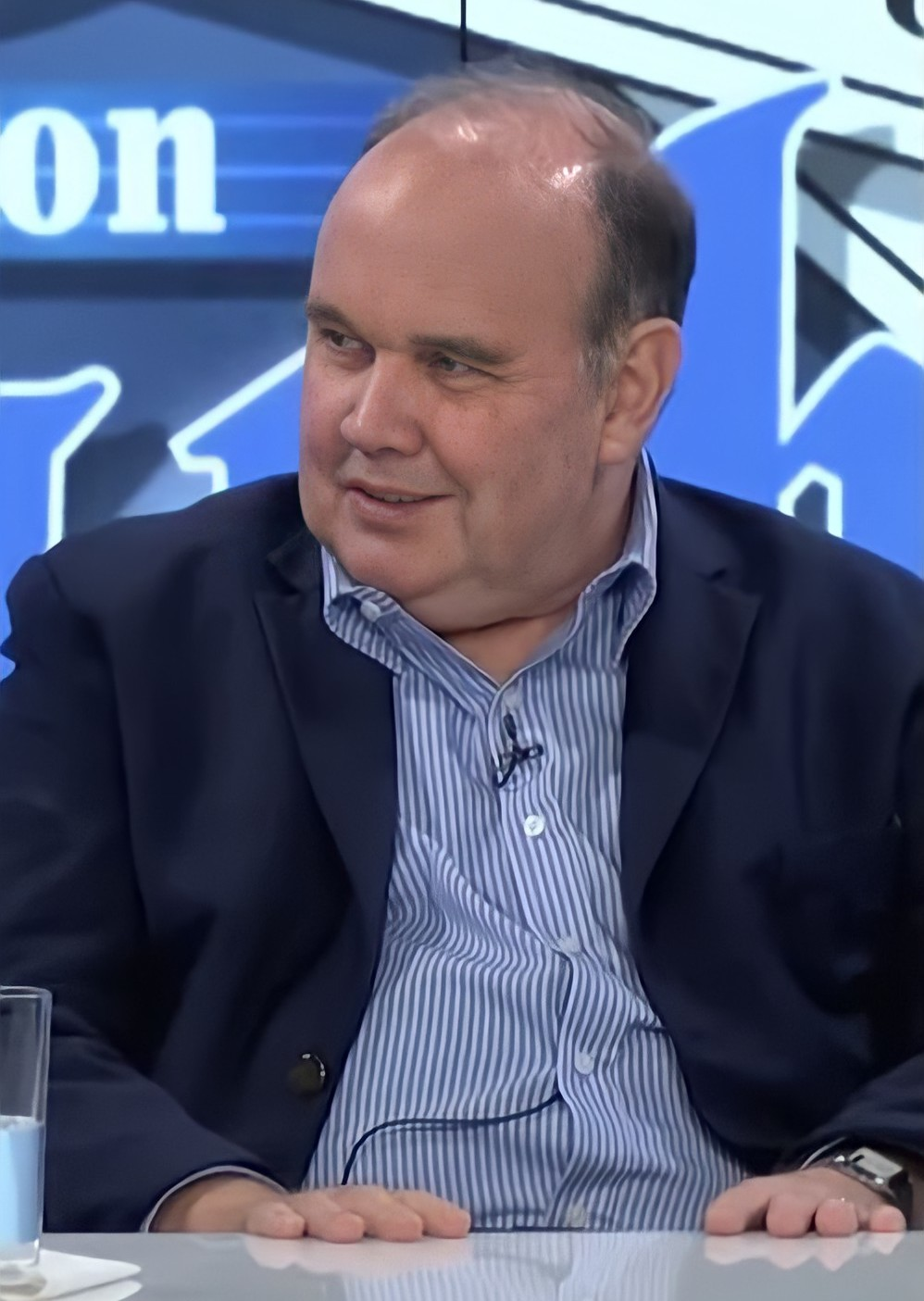
Keiko Fujimori and Rafael López Aliaga, who opposed Castillo and supported the Madrid Charter

Multiple attempts to prevent Castillo from the entering the office of the presidency or to later remove him occurred, beginning shortly after election results were determined. Following reports of Castillo's apparent victory, Fujimori and her supporters made claims of electoral fraud, leading obstructionist efforts to overturn the election with support of citizens in Lima. Many business groups and politicians refused to recognize Castillo's ascent to the presidency, with those among the more affluent, including former military officers and wealthy families, demanded new elections, promoted calls for a military coup, and used rhetoric to support their allegations of fraud. Far-right groups of former soldiers, including La Resistencia, also allied with political parties like Advance Country, Popular Force, and Popular Renewal in an effort to remove Castillo, with some veteran leaders seen directly with Rafael López Aliaga and Castillo's former presidential challenger Keiko Fujimori, who signed the Madrid Charter promoted by the Spanish radical right political party Vox. These groups directed threats towards Castillo government officials and journalists, whilst also calling for a coup d'état and insurgency.

During Castillo's presidency, Congress was dominated by right-wing parties opposed to him, with legislators attempting to impeach multiple times using political avenues. Due to broadly interpreted impeachment wording in the Constitution of Peru (1993), Congress can impeach the president on the vague grounds of "moral incapacity", effectively making the legislature more powerful than the executive branch. In February 2022, it was reported that Fujimorists and politicians close to Fujimori organized a meeting at the Casa Andina hotel in Lima with the assistance of the German liberal organization Friedrich Naumann Foundation, with those present including President of Congress Maricarmen Alva, at which plans to remove Castillo from office were discussed. Alva had already shared her readiness to assume the presidency if Castillo were to be vacated from the position and a leaked Telegram group chat of the board of directors of Congress that she heads revealed plans coordinated to oust Castillo.

By December 2022, Congress had begun motions to attempt the impeachment of Castillo for a third time; he was involved with six different criminal investigations and had already named five separate cabinets to serve under him.

=== Castillo attempts to dissolve Congress ===
Additional information needed

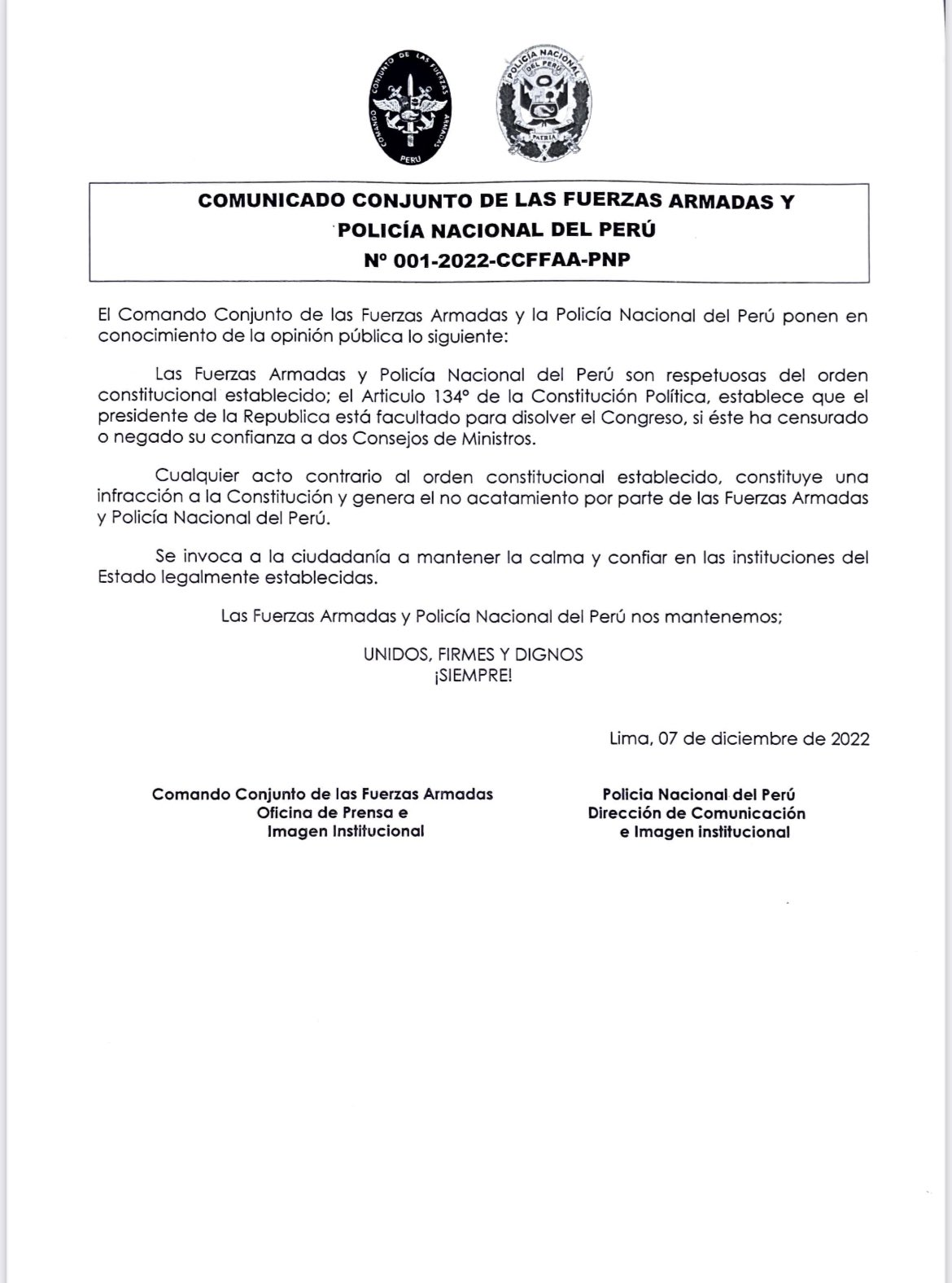
Document of the CCFFAA and PNP rejecting the actions of Castillo

Before 7 December 2022, a march called "Toma de Lima" or "Taking of Lima" was called, originally a meeting in Plaza Bolognesi with the aim of closing the congress and expressing their support for Pedro Castillo. This march was organized by the National Assembly of the Peoples, an organization affiliated with the officials, whose meeting in November of that year was televised. The Agrarian and Rural Front of Peru confirmed their collaboration in the scheduled march.

On 7 December 2022, Congress was expected to file a motion of censure against Castillo, accusing him of "permanent moral incapacity". Before the legislative body could gather to file its motion, Castillo announced the dissolution of Congress and enacted an immediate curfew. Moments after Castillo's speech, multiple ministers resigned from his government, including Prime Minister Betssy Chávez. The Constitutional Court released a statement: "No one owes obedience to a usurping government and Mr. Pedro Castillo has made an ineffective coup d'état. The Armed Forces are empowered to restore the constitutional order." The Armed Forces also issued a statement rejecting Castillo's actions and calling for the maintenance of stability in Peru. Rejecting Castillo's actions to dissolve the legislative body, Congress gathered and voted to remove Castillo from office due to "moral incapacity" with 101 votes in favor, 6 against and 10 abstentions. It was announced that First Vice President Dina Boluarte, who rejected Castillo's actions, would take her oath of office for the presidency at 3:00 pm PET. Castillo's vice president Dina Boluarte entered the Legislative Palace shortly after 3:00 pm PET and appeared before Congress, where she was later sworn in as president of Peru.

In an IEP poll following Castillo's attempt to dissolve Congress, of respondents, 44% approved of Castillo's actions, 53% disapproved and 3% had no opinion or comment, with the majority of support for Castillo's actions being among rural and lower class Peruvians. For Castillo's supporters, Congress performed a coup against the president. In addition, they considered Dina Boluarte a "traitor", "dictator" and "usurper" after her subsequent assumption as the new president of the republic, based on the promise of the then vice president: "If the president is vacated I will go with the president". In this way, supporters of the former president encouraged the prompt release of Castillo and an advance of elections. The demonstrators agreed to the dissolution of the Congress of the Republic, a new constitution through a constituent assembly, the rejection of the then vice president Dina Boluarte and the support for the then president Pedro Castillo, whose objectives were achieved with the populist measures dictated by the then president in his message to the Nation on 7 December.

Mobilizations of leftist organizations related to Castillo were evidenced in Lima, Ayacucho, Cusco, Ica, Arequipa, Trujillo, Chiclayo, Huancavelica, Huancayo, Tacna, Jaén, Moquegua, Ilo, Puno, and Chota, where Castillo grew up.

== Timeline ==
=== Protests begin ===
Lima is one of the cities that were summoned. After the message to the nation, it was denounced that the Minister of the Interior, Willy Huerta, ordered the doors of the congress to be opened, which were closed, so that the summoned protesters could storm the congress. However, due to the failure of Castillo's actions and the subsequent vacancy by the Congress of the Republic, the demonstrations increased. On 7 December, between one and two hundred people gathered in the "Toma de Lima" in the Plaza San Martín and surroundings. The RPP outlet considered the pro-government meeting as the largest since Castillo came to power. Panic buying was registered by the population fearing an escalation of events. Some of the first demonstrations also occurred in Cuzco, Arequipa and in Puno.

The head of the National Directorate of Intelligence (DINI), General Wilson Barrantes Mendoza, met with President Boluarte upon her request on 8 December 2022. The DINI chief would explain to President Boluarte that protests would worsen due to the broad range of requests, including Bolaurte's resignation, the dissolution of Congress, a constituent assembly and immediate general elections. General Barrantes then explained that there was no organized leadership, presenting information from the National Intelligence Council (COIN) and the National Intelligence System (SINA) that there were 16 independent regional groups promoting protests, that political parties and leaders were not organizing the movement and that organizations linked to the Shining Path or the Movement for Amnesty and Fundamental Rights (MOVADEF) were not involved. The general would later state in an interview with La Republica that "To say that there is a 'terrorist inurgency' is stupid", criticizing the Boluarte government for using such rhetoric and for accusing foreign entities of being involved in the protests. The Boluarte government later replaced General Barrantes with Colonel Juan Carlos Liendo O'Connor, a former National Intelligence Service (SIN) agent who worked under Vladimiro Montesinos who described the protests as a "terrorist insurrection" while on Willax Televisión a day prior to his appointment.

The protesters lack leadership and comprise independent groups. Of the many groups that supported protests, MOVADEF encouraged citizens to demonstrate. Rondas campesinas, armed peasant patrols that formerly defended communities from the leftist Shining Path guerilla group, also joined the protests. The Confederación General de Trabajadores del Perú (CGTP), the largest union in Peru, also called for the resignations of the executive and Congress. In Arequipa, they received support from labor unions such as the Arequipa Departmental Federation of Workers, the Civil Construction Union, and the National Front of Transporters and Drivers of Peru. They also had support of the president of the Unified Defense Front against the contamination of the Coata basin and Lake Titicaca. The regional SUTEP, which ignored Boluarte's election and declared a permanent mobilization, also supported.

There were violent confrontations between community members and residents of Andahuaylas against police officers on 10 December. With 3,000 people participating, during the afternoon, the protesters took 2 policemen hostage and requested a "prisoner exchange". In light of this, a division of special forces from Abancay of the PNP moved to Andahuaylas and arrived in a small plane. Hours after the kidnappings, the demonstrators released the police officers and numerous social organizations from the department of Apurimac declared themselves in a "popular insurgency" and will begin a regional strike starting Monday, 12 December. Clashes erupted in the city between protestors and police in the city; two protestors, aged 15 and 18, were killed by police shooting from a helicopter, while four more were injured, one of whom critically.

President Boluarte responded to dissent by removing 26 regional prefects nominated by Castillo from their positions. On 13 December, the United States Ambassador to Peru, Lisa D. Kenna, travels to the Government Palace to meet with President Boluarte.

=== Ayacucho massacre ===
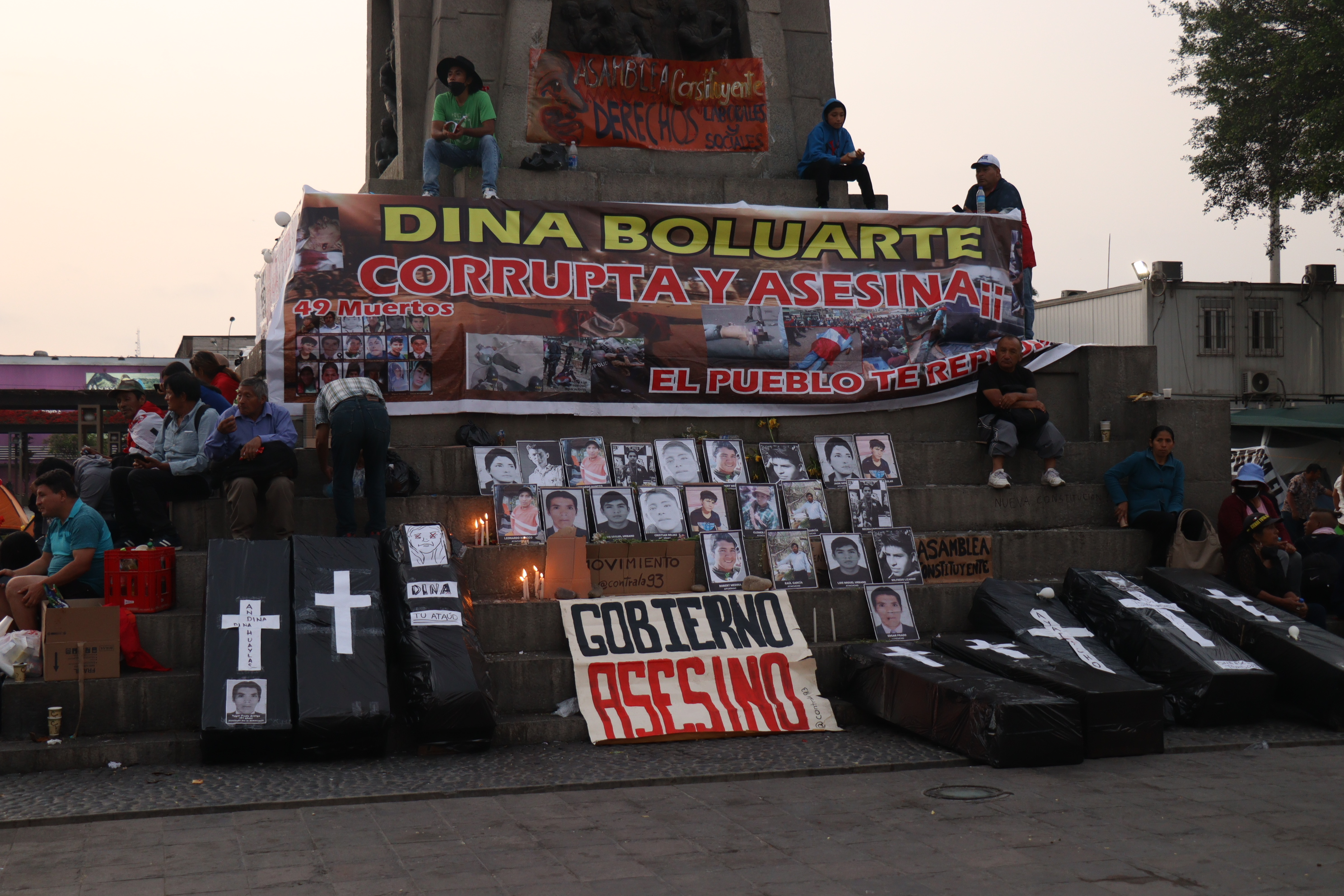
Demonstrations at Plaza Manco Capac following the Ayacucho massacre

The Boluarte government announced a national state of emergency on 14 December, removing some constitutional protections from citizens, including the rights preventing troops from staying within private homes and buildings, the freedom of movement, the freedom of assembly, and "personal freedom and security" for 30 days. The Boluarte government also decreed a curfew for fifteen provinces in eight different regions of Peru on 15 December, in regions including Arequipa, La Libertad, Ica, Apurímac, Cusco, Puno, and Huancavelica.

- Peruvian Army firing live ammunition at protesters in Ayacucho

During protests in Ayacucho, demonstrators approached the Coronel FAP Alfredo Mendívil Duarte Airport, with the Peruvian Armed Forces closing the airport in response, with clashes occurring shortly after. Human rights groups reported that members of the Peruvian Army were seen shooting at civilians protesting in Ayacucho. Casualties were sent for treatment at the Huamanga Network and in the Ayacucho Regional Hospital, with 90% of injuries resulting from gunshot wounds according to the Ayacucho regional health system. The response by authorities caused the collapse of hospital systems in the city, with protesters suffering from gunshot wounds being treated in makeshift triage units. The Ayacucho Regional Health Directorate reported that 8 were killed and 52 were injured.

Former president Castillo is sentenced to 18 months of pretrial detention. While imprisoned, Castillo states that the United States is responsible for the violence in Peru, stating "The visit of the US ambassador to the Government Palace was not free, nor was it in favor of the country. It was to give the order to take the troops to the streets and massacre my defenseless people; and, by the way, leave the way free for mining operations, ... The Peruvian press will not only keep quiet about this, but will deny it so easily."

A day after the massacre, Congress rejected the proposal of advancing the 2026 elections to an earlier date; 49 were in favor, 33 against and 25 abstained, with 87 required for the proposal to pass. On 16 December, Education Minister Patricia Correa and Culture Minister Jair Perez both resigned over the loss of life caused by the protests.

=== Defense Minister named Prime Minister ===
President Boluarte shuffles her first cabinet, placing her former Minister of Defense Alberto Otárola as the new prime minister, while also replacing the Minister of Interior and Minister of Defense. Boluarte's new Minister of Education, Óscar Becerra, was reported to have a history of being an Fujimorist. Protesters continued activities in the regions of Amazonía, Apurímac, Arequipa, Ayacucho, Cusco, La Libertad, Lambayeque, Piura and Puno. In Amazonía, indigenous leaders release a statement stating "We alert the Army, we alert the National Police of Peru not to upset us because we are in our territory, we will see each other there, there we will surely declare war, because they are already provoking us and creating us discomfort".

On 24 December, Prime Minister Otárola stated that the Boluarte government was seeking to make Congress bicameral again while Minister of Justice and Human Rights of Peru, José Tello, announced that reparations would be organized by a commission and distributed to individuals who were killed during the protests.

=== Great March for Peace ===
Counterprotesters from the Great March for Peace singing the national anthem.

Heading into the new year, the Peruvian National Police (PNP) called for citizens to participate in a "Great March for Peace" on 3 January 2023 in the town squares of cities throughout Peru. Internal PNP documents revealed that the march was organized for the political purpose to increase support for the Boluarte government, raising concerns about the police breaching the constitutional separation of authorities and political acts in Articles 34 and 169 of the constitution. In the documents, PNP officials said that officers not participating in the march would face sanctions. When asked about the PNP march by reporters, President Boluarte denied having knowledge of the event, though she had earlier promoted the march during a trip to Cusco days earlier. Concerns regarding the goals of the march and the potential creation of a civilian-military government resulted with Minister of the Interior, Víctor Rojas, cancelling the planned march.

=== Juliaca massacre ===
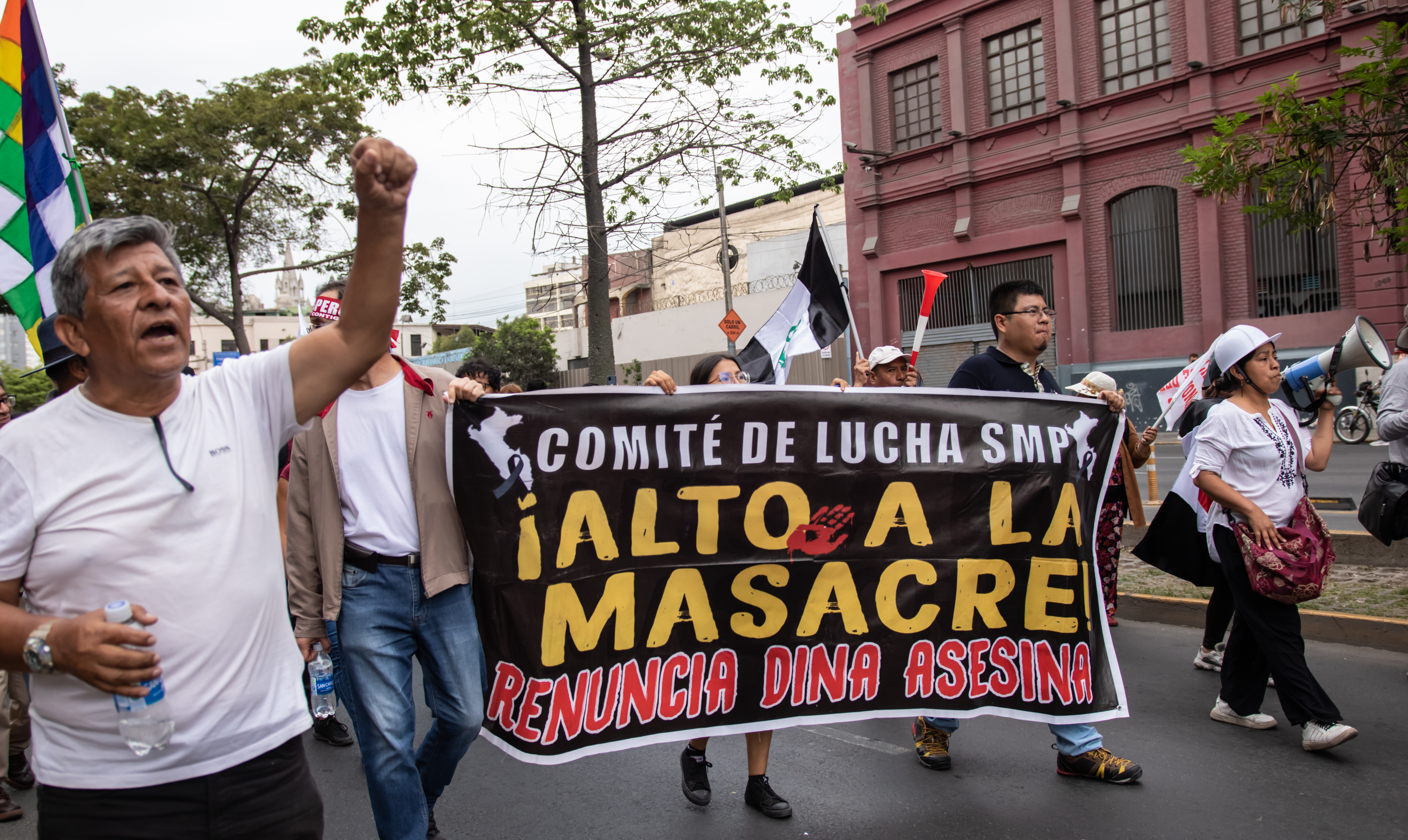
Protesters denouncing massacres, describing President Boluarte as "Dina Asesina" or "Murderer Dina"

In Juliaca, Puno, authorities shot a photojournalist of EFE in the leg, destroyed a motor taxi, and attacked an adolescent and their mother on 7 January.

Protesters from multiple districts of Puno joined demonstrations in Juliaca on 9 January. Protesters approached Inca Manco Cápac International Airport around noon and demonstrated nearby, though when some began to enter the airport at 5:20 pm, authorities responded to the demonstration with deadly force. In total, 17 civilians were killed and over 100 others were injured, with all deaths attributed to gunshot wounds. Journalists covering the massacre were sought to be identified by police intelligence units. After the killing of protesters by the police, looting in Juliaca began into the night, with some authorities seen participating in thefts. The head of the Puno Traffic Safety Police was found with stolen televisions and other goods from a looted store. A total of 40 people were arrested for looting on 10 January. Into the next morning, two officers were detained by unknown individuals; one of the officers reported that about 350 people had captured them and that his partner had disappeared. It was later discovered that his partner was burned alive in his patrol car and had died.

Attorney General of Peru Patricia Benavides announced investigations on 10 January for the alleged crimes of genocide, aggravated homicide and serious injuries against President Dina Boluarte, Prime Minister Alberto Otárola, Minister of the Interior Víctor Rojas and Minister of Defense Jorge Chávez.

=== Toma de Lima marches ===
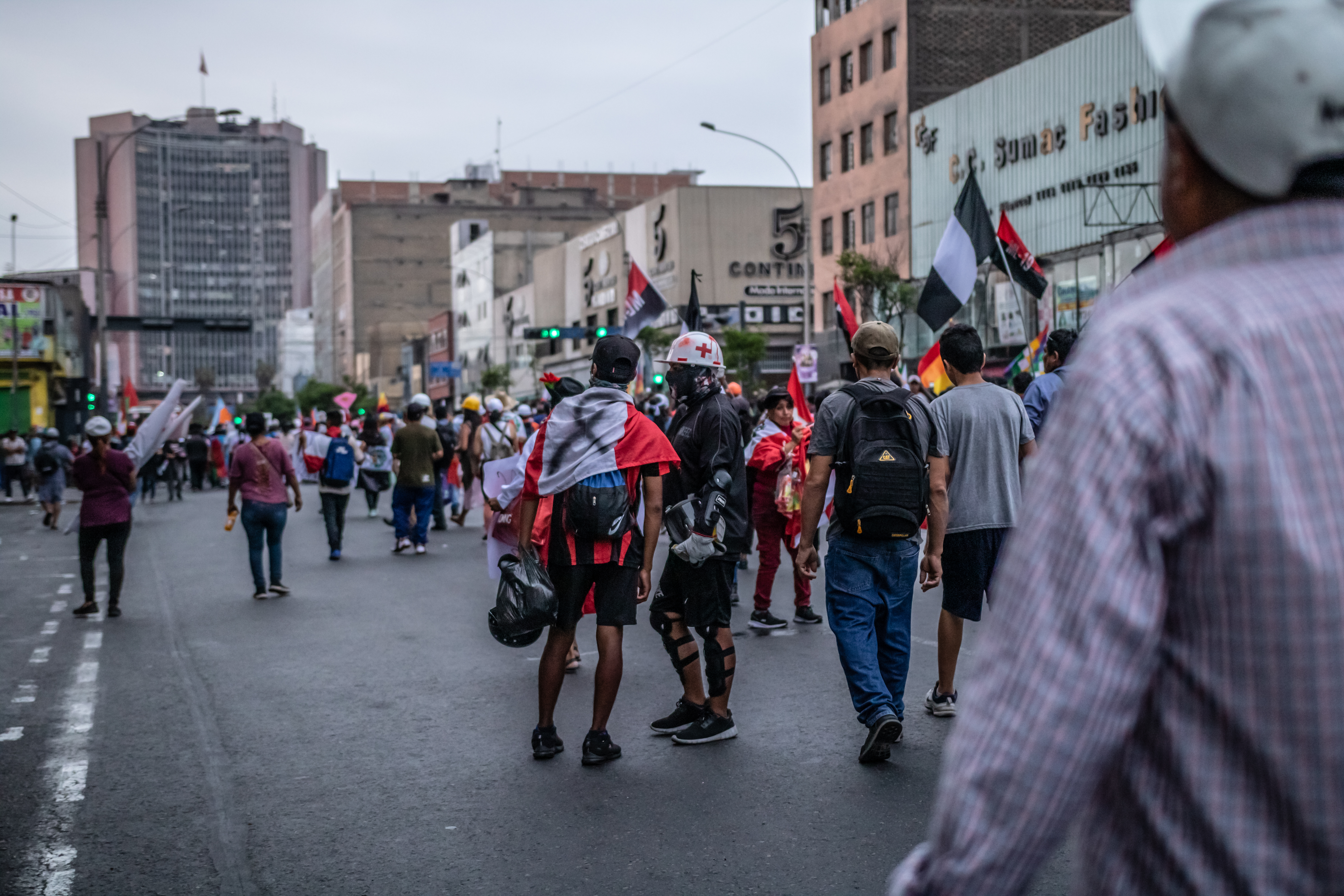
Protests in Lima on 28 January

Protesters from various regions began to congregate in the capital city of Lima on 12 January, with thousands beginning to demonstrate throughout the area in preparation for the Toma de Lima or "Takeover of Lima" protests. Caravans of protesters traveled to Lima and local individuals and shops provided supplies for their journey. The Sole National Central of Peasant Rounds of Peru said that 2,000 ronderos would travel to Lima to participate in demonstrations. On 13 January, the ministers of interior, labor and women resigned from their positions in the Boluarte government. A 30-day state of emergency is declared on 15 January due to the protests. On 17 January, President Boluarte responded to calls for the Toma de Lima protests, stating "I call them to take Lima but in peace and calm. I am waiting for you at the House of Government to talk about your social agendas, because you know that the political agenda you propose is unfeasible". CGTP, Peru's largest union, called for a national strike on 19 January.

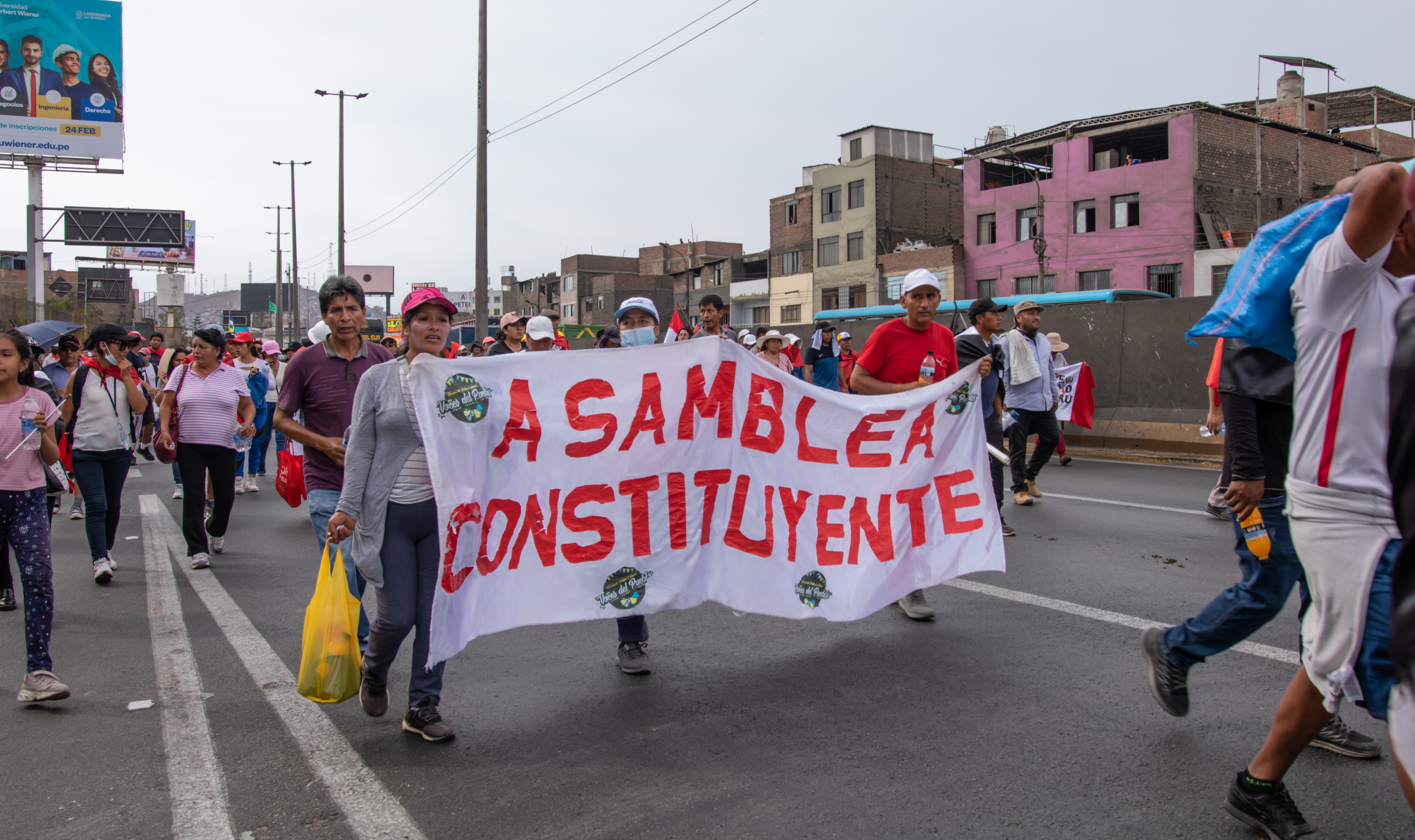
Protesters with a banner demanding a constituent assembly

Tens of thousands of citizens would arrive in Lima for the protest. During the response by authorities, there were reports that police played "The dance of the Chinese" on speakers, a campaign song used to support Alberto Fujimori during the 2000 Peruvian general election. On the night of the 19th, a local historical building next to San Martín Plaza caught fire, collapsing before dawn on the following day. Protesters congregated in Lima would continue to demonstrate in the subsequent weeks, with the first death in the capital city occurring on 28 January 2023 when police shot a man in the head with a tear gas canister. The government denied that police killed the protester.

On 2 February, the city of Lima declared a state of emergency lasting for four months. Through February and March, the media in Lima would move their coverage away from protests in a disinformation effort to minimize participation. During a second "Takeover of Lima" event beginning on 2 March, protest leaders announced that 13 provinces would participate in mobilizations throughout the nation and that protesters would continue to congregate in Lima. During the protests, police fired tear gas directly at the bodies of Aymara women marching with babies on their backs. Minister of Education Óscar Becerra compared the women to animals, stating "Not even animals expose their children", instead suggesting that the women "rent their children so that they can be taken to this" in an effort of media manipulation. The Ministry of Women also avoided condemning the Armed Forces regarding the event. Days later, the state of emergency in Lima was ended on 9 March 2023 as protests waned.

A third "Takeover of Lima" protest occurred nationwide on 19 July 2023; 24,000 police were deployed throughout Peru and several thousand protesters demonstrated in Lima.

== Government response ==
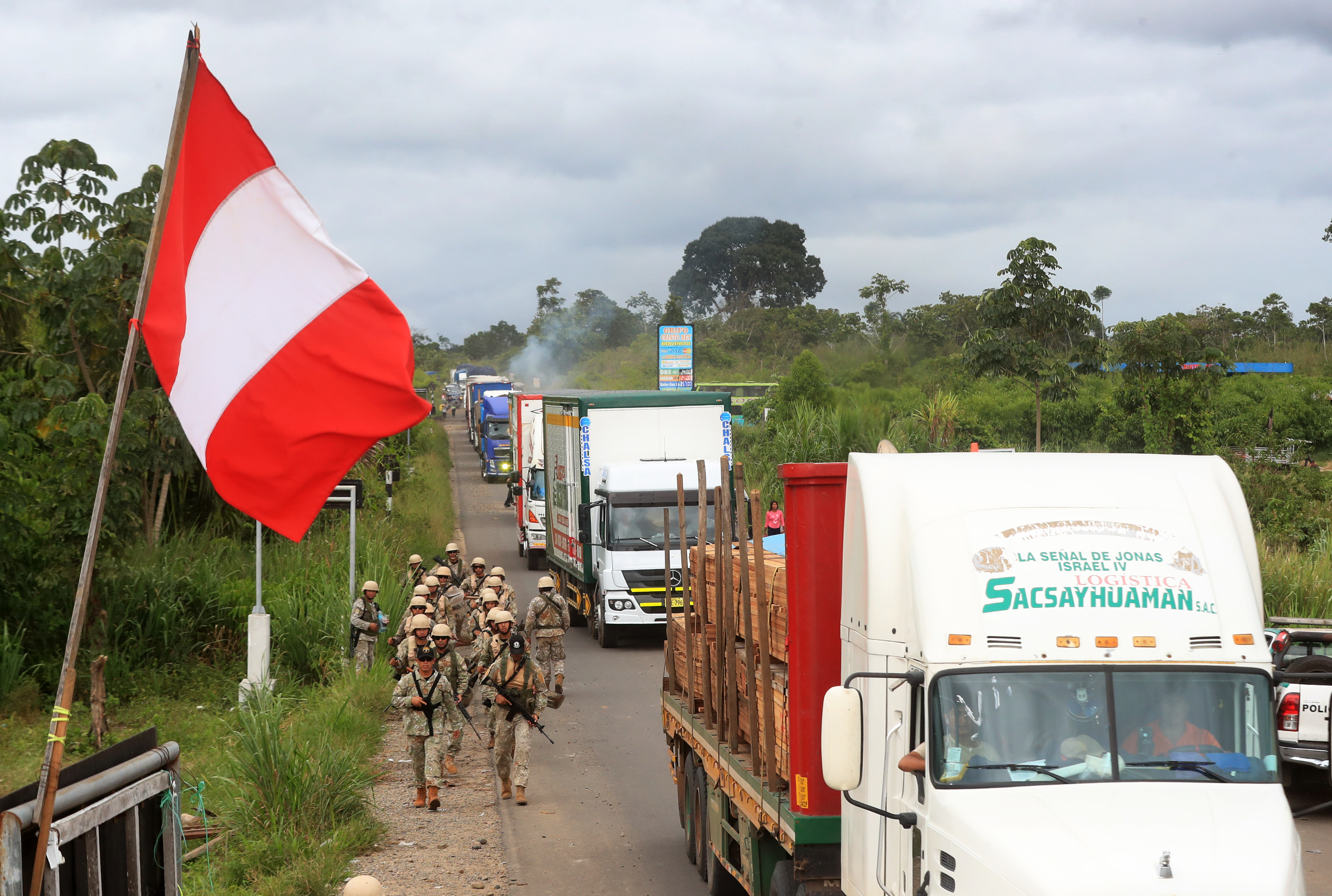
Peruvian Army troops clearing roadblocks in Laberinto, Madre de Dios

=== Criminalization of protest ===
==== Legality ====
The Supreme Court of Peru would respond by criminalizing all demonstrations, prohibiting peaceful protests in a May 2023 judicial ruling that stated they were not protected by the constitution.

A state of emergency and curfews was used by the Boluarte government to prevent further unrest. The Boluarte government submitted to Congress a bill to change the Criminal Procedure Code to increase the length of imprisonment for protesters to up to 15 years during a state of emergency and to remove due process towards accused individuals, immediately sending demonstrators to trial. Analysts described Boluarte's proposal as unconstitutional, saying that penalties for protesting were more severe than those charged with rape, that it removes the possibility of citizens protecting themselves from authorities during a state of emergency and that it increases the already high levels of impunity enjoyed by the armed forces and police in Peru.

==== Terruqueo ====
Boluarte would align with far-right politicians and use the fear mongering tactic of the terruqueo during the protests accusing terrorist groups and Bolivia of organizing demonstrations, though The New York Times wrote that she provided no evidence. The government would also create a web portal for individuals to report "acts of terrorism" in an effort to incriminate protesters, a tool that Amnesty International described as "harassment and criminalization in the current context of socio-political crisis in which social protests are strongly repressed and critical positions towards the government are loaded with accusations of 'terruqueo'".

United Nations Special Rapporteur Clément Nyaletsossi Voule would say that there were no terrorist groups involved in the protests, stating "I did not find any evidence or evidence that protesters were terrorists or that they were controlled by someone else or that they have ties to terrorism. ... They are not terrorists, they are Peruvians". Edgar Stuardo Ralón, Vice President of the Inter-American Commission on Human Rights (IACHR) stated that the use of the terruqueo by the government and authorities created "an environment of permissy and tolerance towards discrimination, stigmatization and institutional violence".

Even so, local and international media reported on the transfer of weapons from the Bolivian border to southern Peru (in the Puno's region), focusing mainly on the so-called "dum dum bullets", ilegal artifacts capable of causing greater damage than a normal bullet and that have been found among groups of "ponchos rojos" crossing the border, as also indicated by the Bolivian deputy Erwin Bazán. The Peruvian police do not use bullets of this type and the Directorate Against Terrorism (Dircote) has said that investigations are still ongoing. The Peruvian government's endorsement of these claims has caused new tensions between the two countries.

=== Increased weaponization ===
The government of Boluarte responded to the protests with force, with the Peruvian police and armed forces criticized for their aggression. Between 20 and 27 December 2022, the Peruvian National Police purchased 31,615 tear gas canisters and grenades from Condor Chemical Industry and the Army Weapons and Ammunition Factory (FAME) for US$661,530. In May 2023, Spain would reject further sales of weapons to Peru due to the unrest.

=== Refusal of advanced elections ===
President Boluarte initially stated that she and Congress agreed to move the next general election from 2026 to April 2024, though she later agreed with the December 2023 election date proposed by Castillo after she previously described such a move as illegal. Congress has rejected all attempts at advancing general elections in Peru and constitutional reforms have been ignored.

== State violence towards protesters ==
=== Deaths and injuries ===
Deaths during protests
Locations	Deaths
Apurímac	6
Arequipa	4
Ayacucho	10
Cuzco	4
Huancavelica	1
Junín	3
La Libertad	5
Lima	1
Puno	23
San Martín	1
Total	58

The Armed Forces of Peru has a history of impunity, being responsible for at least 167 deaths between 2003 and 2020 while those responsible did not face consequences in nearly all events. Experts of the Office of the United Nations High Commissioner for Human Rights were greatly concerned about arbitrary killings performed by Peruvian authorities against protesters. According to attorney Mar Pérez of the Coordinadora Nacional de Derechos Humanos (CNDDHH), "Assassinations in protests are not a new event in Peru. ... The most serious situations have occurred when the Army intervenes. The impunity rate in these murders is close to 100%" According to the Peruvian government, at least 60 civilians have been killed and more than 600 injured during protests as of 20 January 2023. Most of those killed died by being shot by the police and the military, with some individuals killed being bystanders. Among the dead, two minors were killed during the protests in Apurímac as the result of Peruvian troops firing at protesters from a helicopter. In Pichanaqui, three individuals were killed after being shot in the back by police. Two massacres also occurred; the Ayacucho massacre on 15 December 2022 that resulted with ten civilians killed and the Juliaca massacre on 9 January 2023, with the PNP killing eighteen civilians during the event, resulting with the most deaths in a single day during the protests. A New York Times investigation stated regarding the two events concluded that authorities intentionally used lethal force when they fired shotguns and assault rifles at unarmed protesters who were fleeing from them.

=== Human rights violations ===
Democracy is very much on the line in Peru. The protesters’ demand for new elections is, ultimately, democratic. But repression and denial are likely to breed more anger and despair, playing into the hands of would-be autocrats across the political spectrum.

— Human Rights Watch

Strong protests occurred in indigenous and Quechua majority regions, the center of Castillo's support, raising comparisons between Boluarte's actions and that of previous anti-Native governments of Peru. The United Nations Human Rights Council said that it was "deeply concerned about the possibility of an escalation of violence". Undercover operations by police in plain clothes arresting demonstrators has been recorded, with Jan Jarab, representative of UN Human Rights in South America, previously condemning such actions in Peru, stating "It has been possible to identify cases of arrests made by police officers dressed as civilians without identifying themselves as such. The Peruvian authorities must put an end to this type of procedure, incompatible with international human rights standards".

Edgar Stuardo Ralón, Vice President of the Inter-American Commission on Human Rights (IACHR), stated during a delegation visit to Peru that individuals living in Lima participated in "widespread stigmatization" that is linked to "the historical and structural inequalities that exist in the country, those linked to the historical discrimination faced by indigenous peoples, the peasant population and the provinces", with such stigmatization resulting with increased political polarization and violence. According to La República, President of the Supreme Court of Peru, Javier Arévalo Vela, disagreed that human rights violations occurred in Peru when holding talks with Ralón, stating "in Peru there is no policy of human rights violations, but rather here it exists, at the moment, it is a situation of violence that has two aspects: the just claims of the population and the acts of vandalism that you have seen. ... we have to separate the straw from the wheat. This is the reality of the Judiciary".

==== Extrajudicial executions and massacres ====
We don’t have any power over them. I can be the Supreme Chief of the Armed Forces, but I have no command and the protocols are decided by them

— Dina Boluarte

The IACHR would describe the events in Ayacucho and Juliaca as massacres. Amnesty International, in an investigation regarding human rights violations perpetrated during the protests, focused on 25 individuals killed during protests in their report, noting that 20 of the 25 individuals had been extrajudicially executed. President Dina Boluarte would say that no massacres occurred and that she had no power over the Peruvian Armed Forces.

==== Excessive force ====
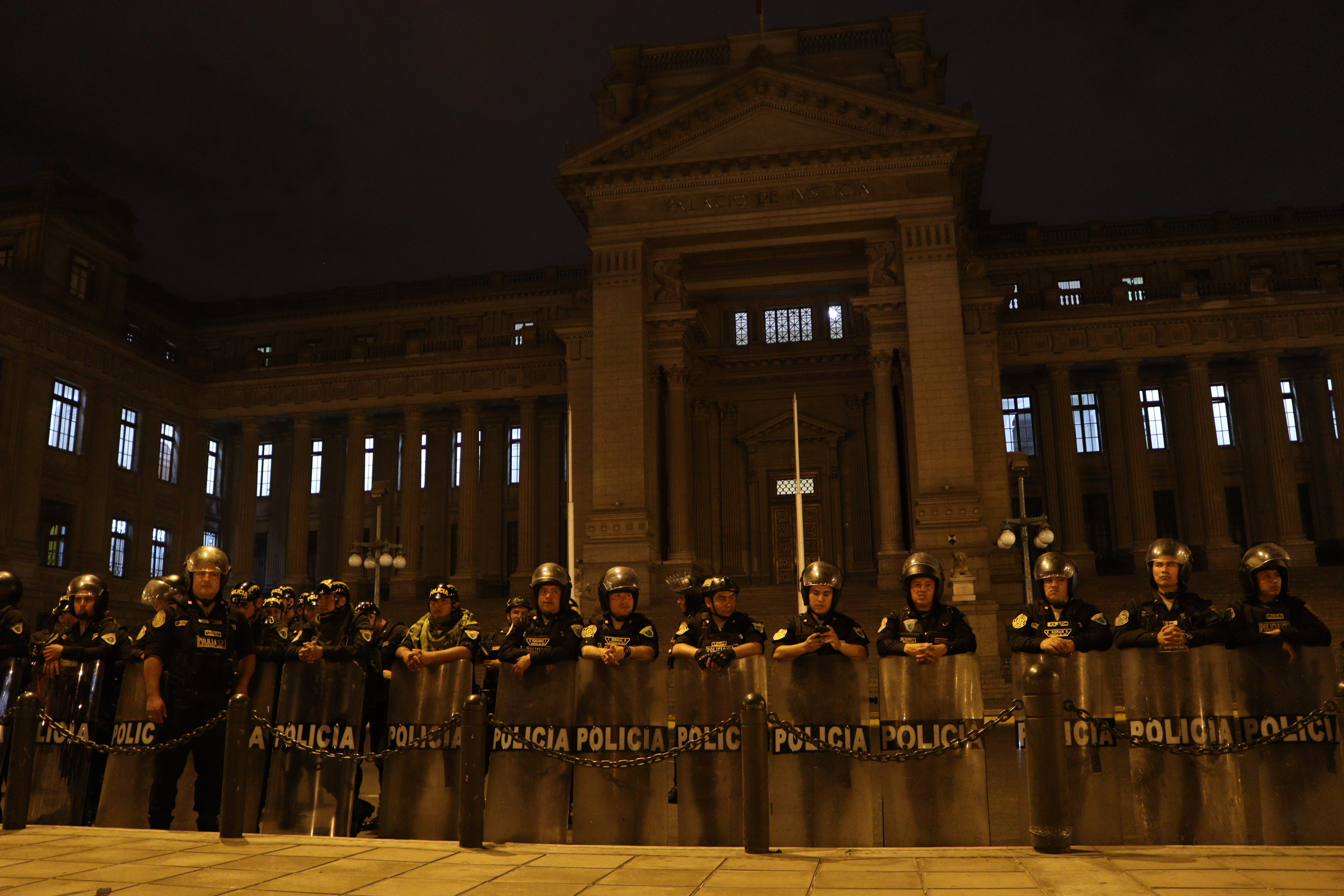
Riot police lined up in front of the Palace of Justice

Human Rights Watch (HRW) stated "Excessive use of force by state agents is a persistent problem in Peru. Rules for use of force by security forces do not comply with international standards", reporting that Congress had removed proportionality guidelines regarding use of force, making it easier for authorities to use excessive force with impunity. HRW would later criticize President Boluarte's violent response to protests, lack of providing accountability to authorities and her effort to blame protest violence on Bolivia without providing evidence. According to OjoPúblico, "A series of images, testimonies, police manuals and necropsies analyzed by OjoPúblico expose serious human rights violations during police and military repression actions, mainly in the southern regions of the country."

According to Legislative Decree 1186 of August 2015, the Peruvian National Police are responsible for the use of force against protesters, are prohibited from shooting at short range and are only to fire at the lower extremities. However, the armed forces were included in responding to protests following the announcement of a national emergency, according to OjoPúblico. OjoPúblico also wrote that authorities have fired projectiles out of helicopters above protesters despite human rights groups condemning the practice.

The Coordinadora Nacional de Derechos Humanos (CNDDHH) condemned the violent response of the Boluarte government and Peruvian authorities, stating "Although some protests have been recording violent actions and attacks on journalists and the media, senior officials of the Dina Boluarte Government have been endorsing a response from the police forces that is clearly outside the national and international regulatory framework". The human rights group reported that authorities had beaten detainees while in custody; used less-lethal weapons improperly, which injured civilians; prevented legal representatives from meeting with those arrested; and held some in custody for longer than what legal standards permit. The CNDDHH reported the Peruvian authorities were recorded firing tear gas canisters directly at protesters, resulting in one serious injury in Lima, and the incidence of police and armed forces firing live ammunition towards demonstrators. Reports of arbitrary arrest and detention were also shared by the CNDDHH, with the group sharing that individuals going to and from work were arrested and isolated. On 15 December, the CNDDHH denounced the use of "weapons of war" against protestors, with the NGO sharing a video of authorities using automatic firearms against demonstrators. The CNDDHH would later demand in mid-January that President Boluarte resign.

- Authorities shooting a protester in the head with a tear gas canister

Amnesty International's Americas head Erika Guevara-Rosas called for governmental restraint, saying: "State repression against protesters is only deepening the crisis in Peru. The authorities must put an end to the excessive use of force against demonstrations and guarantee the right to peaceful protest, using the legal and proportional means necessary to restore citizen security." Amnesty International also confirmed that Peruvian authorities were firing tear gas canisters at close range directly at the bodies of protesters. Amnesty International, in a report, further accused the authorities of racial prejudice and said that Indigenous people were the majority of those who have been disproportionately targeted.

==== Intrusions ====
OjoPúblico documented that authorities have entered the homes of citizens to gain access to roofs and fire at protesters. The home intrusions by authorities resulted with possessions being destroyed.

Following the Toma de Lima protests, the PNP raided the National University of San Marcos with armored personnel carriers and dozens of officers, detaining over 200 protesters located on the campus. The Inter-American Commission on Human Rights condemned the PNP's actions, saying they were "incompatible with the principles of international law".

==== Torture ====
According to testimony from a detained protesters interviewed by OjoPúblico, a group of protesters detained for three days by authorities were prohibited from having food and were beaten.

== Media ==
After ascending to the presidency, President Boluarte quickly received support from Peru's national media companies. The national media in Peru largely overlooked the massacres in Ayacucho and Juliaca.

=== Attacks on journalists ===
The National Association of Journalists indicated that 21 journalists were victims of aggression between 7 and 11 December. Journalists interviewed by Wayka reported that authorities would frequently attack press workers and would attempt to prevent photographers from capturing images of individuals being detained. Similar incidents of authorities preventing journalists from documenting the protests were collected by OjoPúblico. One photojournalist for the EFE, Aldair Mejía reported that he was threatened by police during a protest in Juliaca, saying that an officer told him "I'll blow off your head and you get out of here dead"; Mejía was later shot in the leg by police while covering protests.

=== Censorship ===
External videos
- A video showing police shooting a protester in the head with a tear gas canister, medical volunteers providing aid and the testimony of one of the responders on YouTube

Following the death of a protester on 28 January 2023, journalist Carlos Cornejo of the state-owned TV Perú reported to audiences, stating "It's good news that the roads have been opened. Some bad news: the murder of a citizen at the hands of the police. ... They will want to tell us that it was a stone, they will want to tell us that it was not them, they will want to say anything, but the images do not lie: we all saw that the police killed Victor Santisteban". The government would attempt to deny that police killed the protester. Despite two videos showing the protester being shot in the head with a tear gas canister, General Victor Zanabria of the Peruvian National Police said it was "not yet determined" what killed the protester. Following Cornejo's report on the death of the protester, the National Institute of Radio and Television of Peru (IRTP), the parent company of TV Perú, refused to renew the reporter's contract on 31 January. According to the National Association of Journalists of Peru (ANP), the actions against Cornejo were "an indicted and arbitrary dismissal", stating "In circumstances in which, from all media, and essentially state media, it is imperative to guarantee a plurality of approaches and voices to promote public debate. Extinguishing critical positions can even constitute censorship".

== Effects ==
=== Economic ===
The main economic sectors of the Peruvian economy, mining and tourism, largely ceased during the protests. Three weeks into protests, the National Chamber of Tourism (Canatur) reported that due to protests, Peru had lost an estimated 1.7 billion soles($450 million USD) of tourism income since the start of the demonstrations. A month into protests, some stores in Lima were reporting a 60% decrease in sales compared to the previous year. According to the Boluarte government, Peru experienced $1.3 billion of infrastructure damage from protests by late January. On 31 January 2023, Moody's Investors Service changed Peru's credit rating outlook to "Negative", citing "a deterioration in institutional cohesion, governability, policy effectiveness and economic strength through successive governments".

== Reactions ==
=== Domestic ===
==== Politicians ====
- Ethnocacerists and their leader Antauro Humala at first called Boluarte "president" during pro-Castillo protests. Later Humala called her "de facto president" and called for protests. The Ethnocacerist movement compared Boluarte with Jeanine Áñez thus comparing Castillo's impeachment to the 2019 Bolivian political crisis.
- Former president Ollanta Humala called President Boluarte to resign and called the congress "indolent and irresponsible".

==== Public opinion ====
According to IEP polling from early January 2023, 60% of respondents believed that the protests were justified, 58% believed that police used excessive force and 44% believed that the protests were organized by citizens groups or spontaneous action. The January poll also showed that compared to other regions, more respondents in Lima believed that the protests were terrorism and that the use of force by authorities was justified, while those polled in other regions did not. President Boluarte had a disapproval rate of 71% while 88% of respondents disapproved of Congress. When asked if they supported the calls for a new constituent assembly, 69% of respondents approved. According to those analyzing the polls, responses showed the disconnect between Lima and outlying regions. An IEP poll conducted between 21 and 25 January 2023 showed that among respondents, 73% demanded general elections in 2023, 74% believed President Boluarte – who now had a 76% disapproval rate – should resign, 89% disapproved of Congress.

==== Regional governments ====
- The National Assembly of Regional Governments proposed the convening of the National Agreement to seek a consensus between organizations, political parties and unions.
- The Regional Government of Apurímac announced the indefinite suspension of classes at all educational levels and alerted all institutions to work under the virtual modality throughout the department, with the exception of the health sector.

=== International ===
==== Governments ====
- Argentina, Bolivia, Colombia, Mexico: Presidents Alberto Fernández, Luis Arce, Gustavo Petro, and Andrés Manuel López Obrador issued a joint comuniqué through the Mexican Presidential Office expressing their "deep concern" about the Peruvian Congress not respecting "the will of its citizens at the ballot box". They added that "it is no news" that Castillo, from the day of his election, "was the victim of anti-democratic harassment, in violation of Article 23 of the American Convention on Human Rights". The four governments said that "our governments call on all the actors involved in the previous process to prioritize the will of the citizens that was pronounced at the ballot box. This is the way to interpret the scope and meaning of the notion of democracy as set forth in the Inter-American Human Rights System".
  - Colombia: President Gustavo Petro additionally stated that "the crisis in Peru, imprisoning without judge or legal defense a President elected by popular vote put under serious questioning the role of the American Convention in the Latin-American legal order".
- Brazil: The government of Luiz Inácio Lula da Silva would prohibit the sales of weapons to the Peruvian state until a "period of political and social instability" ended.
- Canada: Ambassador Louis Marcotte met with Peruvian foreign minister Ana Cecilia Gervasi Diaz, expressing Canada's support for the Boluarte government.
- Chile: President Gabriel Boric regretted the deaths reported as the result of the protests and called on the Peruvian government to "guard and respect human rights". Boric, who referred to the situation in Peru as "serious", supported the Inter-American Commission on Human Rights mission in the country.
- Russia: Russian Foreign Ministry spokesperson Maria Zakharova said that Russia "hopes in the normalization of the situation in Peru and that contradictions facing one faction with each other can be resolved in a legal frame, with democratic norms and within human rights, between Peruvians and without foreign interference."
- United States: United States Secretary of State Antony Blinken made a phone call to President Boluarte and requested that her government "redouble their efforts to make needed reforms and safeguard democratic stability". In the 2022 Country Reports on Human Rights Practices of the United States Department of State, the United States condemned reports of torture, arbitrary killings, as well as the impunity granted to authorities and government officials, writing "the government did not effectively prevent the abuses or punish those who committed them".
- Holy See: Pope Francis stated "We pray for peace. May the violence [in Peru] cease and may the path of dialogue be taken to overcome the political and social crisis affecting the people".
- Spain: The Government of Spain would prohibit the sales of weapons to the Peruvian state due to the instability faced during protests.

==== Supranational bodies ====
- United Nations: On 6 March 2023, United Nations experts stated "Serious allegations of excessive use of force by security forces and the Government’s inability to create a conducive environment for dialogue are a matter of great concern. ... In any democratic society, people have the right to protest and raise their concerns about political changes that affect their lives and livelihoods. Peru’s democracy is facing a credibility crisis". The experts also raised concern about arbitrary killings, forced disappearances, excessive use of force, the use of the terruqueo and racism in Peru.

== See also ==
- 2019 Bolivian protests
- 2021–2022 Peruvian mining protests
- March–April 2022 Peruvian protests
- 2022 Peruvian self-coup attempt
- 2022–2023 Brazilian election protests
- 2025 Peruvian protests
