= Pilar Coll =

Spanish lawyer and activist (1929–2012)

Pilar Coll Torrente (Fonz, Huesca, January 30, 1929 – Lima, September 15, 2012) was a Spanish activist, missionary and lawyer recognized for her commitment in favor of human rights and the search for justice for thousands of detainees disappeared during the internal armed conflict in Peru. She was the first Executive Secretary of the National Coordinator of Human Rights. Pilar Coll has received several awards and prizes for her outstanding work in the defense and promotion of human rights and the constitutional order of Peru, so much so that in 1993, she was awarded with the appointment of lady of the Order of Isabella the Catholic by the King Juan Carlos I and, in 2008, by the Ombudsman of Peru.
