= Coordinadora Nacional de Derechos Humanos =

Organization of Peru

National Coordinator for Human Rights
- Coordinadora Nacional de Derechos Humanos
- Formation: 1985; 41 years ago
- Type: Human rights group
- Location: Peru
- Website: derechoshumanos.pe/english-cnddhh

Coordinadora Nacional de Derechos Humanos (CNDDHH, National Coordinator for Human Rights) is a coalition of human rights groups in Peru founded in 1985. Members of the CNDDHH served on Peru's Truth and Reconciliation Commission. It has acted as the spokesperson for Peru's human rights movement since its founding.

== History ==
During the internal conflict in Peru, it communicated regularly with international human rights groups, foreign diplomats, and the United Nations. The CNDDHH was also involved with responding to human rights concerns during the events of the 2020 and the 2022–2023 Peruvian political protests.

== Executive Secretaries ==
- Pilar Coll Torrente (1987-1992)
- Rosa María Mujica Barreda (1992-1995)
- Susana Villarán de la Puente (1995-1997)
- Sofía Macher Batanero (1997-2001)
- Francisco Soberón Garrido (2002-2005)
- Pablo Rojas Rojas (2006-2008)
- Ronald Gamarra Herrera (2008-2010)
- Rocío Silva Santisteban Manrique (2011-2015)
- Jorge Bracamonte (2015-)
