= Rondas campesinas =

Autonomous peasant patrols in rural Peru

- Leaders: Various, including: Antonio Cárdenas; "Capitán Vic" (Note: Also known as "Mayor Rick".)
- Dates active: 29 December 1976–present
- Country: Peru
- Part of: CUNARC-P

Rondas campesinas (Spanish pronunciation: [ˌrondas kampeˈsinas]; lit. 'peasant rounds') are autonomous peasant patrols in rural Peru. They were especially active during the internal conflict in Peru with the insurgency of the Maoist group Shining Path and the Túpac Amaru Revolutionary Movement, having been organised by the Peruvian Armed Forces under the name of Self-Defence Committees (Comités de Autodefensa, CAD). (Note: Also known as the Civil Defence Committees (Comités de Defensa Civil, CDC) or as the "Counter-Subversive" rounds (Rondas Campesinas Contrasubversivas).)

== History ==
The rondas were originally formed as a protection force against theft, especially cattle rustling. They developed further as a response to the Shining Path's violence against their local leaders.

When Shining Path leader Abimael Guzmán launched his insurgency against the government in 1980, the Peruvian armed forces by and large ignored the threat at the very outset. Because the very core of the movement was land and wealth redistribution, the insurgency was confined to rural areas in the Andean regions inhabited by indigenous and Amerindian groups, and largely off the radar of the government. The Shining Path challenged the government by making scenes. They would dynamite buildings and make big symbolic gestures, such as "blowing up a major general's tomb or hanging dogs". The government left it to the police to deal with what they viewed as petty criminals. The president at the time, Belaunde, did not see the need for military intervention until there was a state of emergency declared over the Ayacucho region in 1982. At that point, the Shining Path had gained a lot of popular support in that region from their promises of wealth redistribution. Two major things led to the Shining Path's loss of popular support and the rise of the rondas campesinas. The first was the practice executing "enemies of the people", which originally involved executing clear criminals, but developed into a system of distrust and suspicion of neighbors and relatives who might report someone to be killed as a way of ending a fight. The second was the Shining Path's attempts to isolate rural communities from urban communities and stop major parts of daily life for rural peasants, namely markets and fiestas. The Shining Path's final undoing was in their assassination of well-liked local authorities in a few villages in 1982. These actions led to the violent reactions and the beginnings of the better known rondas in those villages. Rondas were not the only resistance to the Shining Path, but they were one of the main responses.

In 1983, one of the first peasant uprisings occurred in Huaycho (a small village in the Ayacucho Region) took the rest of the Peruvian nation by surprise, as it had previously been thought that the Shining Path was a well-received movement everywhere. This resistance to the Shining Path was met with praise and respect from national media and the Peruvian president as a "brave and resolute" response to a generally unpopular group. This respect was lost within a week though, as eight journalists that had been seeking to cover the story of Huaycho were killed in another community, known as Uchuraccay, which had considered the journalists to be more guerrillas. It has been suggested that these particular communities reacted to the Shining Path violently because they were less susceptible to the Shining Path's socially divisive practices than other communities, as the residents were more closely related to each other and already had the social equality the Shining Path claimed to be in favor of, and thus were more angered by the Shining Path's decision to kill their local leaders than other communities. Another possible motivation suggested was that these communities had only had privatized land belonging to peasants rather than rich leaders since the late 1970s and thus were less supportive of the Shining Path's ideals of communal land and work.

Peasants who did not support the Shining Path, therefore, created "rondas campesinas".

=== Development ===
Before 1990, there were few legally recognized rondas, and most of those were in locations legally under a state of emergency, and differed in structure to those developed for theft protection. The rondas that legally existed before 1990 were recognized (and sometimes created) by the government to protect areas that were legally declared to be under a state of emergency. A few were locally created, but were still required to obtain legal recognition to function. Later, they evolved into a full-blown private justice system, complete with courts. They often provoked the ire of the Peruvian state.

The reason the rondas were supported by peasants was that the Shining Path, while claiming to work in the best interests of the common people in theory, in practice were forcing unworkable economic strategies and terroristic behaviors on an already downtrodden peasant class. These peasants, who didn't support the government in place but also didn't support the Shining Path's destruction, turned to the rondas for protection and order locally.

=== Organization ===
The different levels of violence and the bottom-up production of security resulted in different organizational patterns within the communities. In the north of the country, most communities suffered from cattle rustling and criminal actions, the peasant communities arranged their patrols through peer-to-peer enforcement. In the south and center, terrorism presented an existential threat reducing the villagers' time horizon. The higher risks increased the willingness for the peasantry to allocate authority to the security arrangement. Communities tended to organize vertically.

The rondas developed their own legal system that acts parallelly to the ordinary justice system.

=== Legalization and government coordination ===
It was only in 1982 that the Peruvian government began to take action in earnest. Military rule was established in nine provinces after a state of emergency was declared in December of that year, and the rondas campesinas were employed by the military. The Peruvian military, their auxiliaries the rondas campesinas, and the Sendero Luminoso guerrillas all committed human rights atrocities during the course of the conflict. For two years, the "dirty war" was fought, with all sides killing anyone suspected for any reason of being with whoever "the enemy" was to the killers. The Peruvian Marine Infantry made a policy of clearing the countryside for battle, and relocating people to strategically defended areas. It was in one of these new settlements that the first official civil defense committee was developed by the citizens, based on the military's model of government. Men and women both contributed to the committee, with men patrolling and protecting the community while women cooked and cleaned in support of the men's obligations.

In 1990, President Alberto Fujimori came to power. He, along with Peru's armed forces, armed the rondas campesinas. From 1991 to 1992, the president and the government issued several decrees legalizing and regulating the existing rondas. Specifically, the "Comites de Autodefensa" (Committees of Self-Defense) were to work in tandem with the military and/or the police to provide local defense of their villages. These committees were armed by the government, mostly with 12-gauge shotguns, and trained by the official Peruvian military. A later decree specified that all legally recognized rondas needed to work with and under the guidelines of the Comites de Autodefensa.

=== Modern-day impact ===
Even though the internal conflict is now largely confined to the VRAEM and has greatly diminished since 1992, the term rondero is still used in everyday speech in Peru to signify a volunteer neighbourhood watchman either the countryside or in the suburbs of cities such as Lima or Trujillo. These days, the defining quality of the rondero appears to be that he is unpaid, unlike the ubiquitous "Huachiman" and the uniformed security guards that are seen outside of homes and business all over Peru.

The communal peasant organization integrated the rondas campesinas. Several former leaders of the rondas campesinas were able to participate successfully in the political process. The previous president of Peru Pedro Castillo claims to be a former rondero.

== See also ==
- Internal conflict in Peru
