= Sole National Central of Peasant Rounds of Peru =

- Central Única Nacional de Rondas Campesinas del Perú (CUNARC-P)
- Formation: December 3, 2006; 19 years ago
- Type: Self-defense force
- Region served: Peru
- President: Santos Saavedra Vásquez
- Vice President: Faustino Guevara Vasquez

The Sole National Central of Peasant Rounds of Peru (Spanish: Central Única Nacional de Rondas Campesinas del Perú, CUNARC-P) is the largest organization of rondas campesinas in Peru. The group consists indigenous peasants, organized into 1,000 local groups, that provide peacekeeping and justice services in rural areas of Peru.

== History ==
Prior to the 2021 Peruvian general election, CUNARC-P and Pedro Castillo maintained a friendly relationship. The Ministry of Culture of Peru added CUNARC-P to the Database of Indigenous or Indigenous Peoples (BDPI) in April 2022 to grant the group official political participation in governmental actions. During the 2022–2023 Peruvian political protests, CUNARC-P joined in demonstrations against the government of Dina Boluarte.
