= Confederación General de Trabajadores del Perú =

National trade union center in Peru

CGTP
- Confederación General de Trabajadores del Perú
- Founded: 1929
- Headquarters: Lima, Peru
- Location: Peru
- Key people: Mario Huamán (secretary general)
- Affiliations: WFTU
- Website: cgtp.org.pe

The Workers' General Confederation of Peru (in Spanish: Confederación General de Trabajadores del Perú CGTP) is a national trade union center in Peru. It was formed in 1929 by José Carlos Mariátegui.

The CGTP is the largest trade union federation in Peru, and is affiliated with the World Federation of Trade Unions.

In August 2013, the CGTP launched a major online campaign (hosted on LabourStart) together with other unions in Peru protesting the new civil service act.
