= List of diplomatic missions of Peru =

This is a list of diplomatic missions of Peru, excluding honorary consulates.

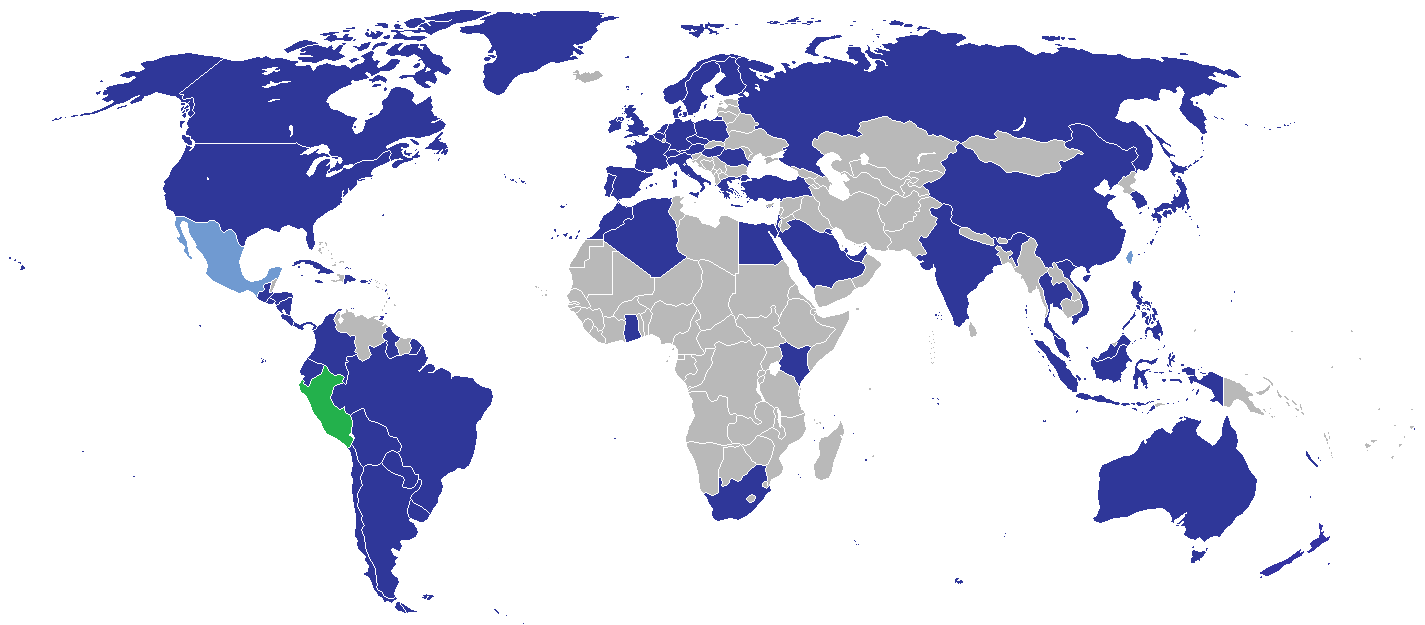
Map of Peruvian Diplomatic Missions Republic of Peru Countries hosting a Peruvian embassy Countries hosting a Peruvian consular mission or de facto embassy

== Current missions ==
=== Africa ===
Host country	Host city	Mission	Concurrent accreditation	Ref.
Algeria	Algiers	Embassy	Countries: Tunisia	
Egypt	Cairo	Embassy	Countries: Iraq; Jordan; Lebanon; Syria	
Ghana	Accra	Embassy		
Kenya	Nairobi	Embassy	Multilateral Organizations: United Nations; United Nations Environment Programme	
Morocco	Rabat	Embassy	Countries: Mauritania; Senegal	
South Africa	Pretoria	Embassy	Countries: Angola; Mozambique; Namibia; Zambia; Zimbabwe	

=== Americas ===
Host country	Host city	Mission	Concurrent accreditation	Ref.
Argentina	Buenos Aires	Embassy		
Argentina	Buenos Aires	Consulate-General (Note: The embassy's consular section has Consulate-General status and is recognized as a separate mission.)		
Argentina	Córdoba	Consulate-General		
Argentina	La Plata	Consulate-General		
Argentina	Mendoza	Consulate-General		
Bolivia	La Paz	Embassy		
Bolivia	La Paz	Consulate-General		
Bolivia	Cochabamba	Consulate-General		
Bolivia	Santa Cruz de la Sierra	Consulate-General		
Brazil	Brasília	Embassy	Countries: Suriname	
Brazil	Manaus	Consulate-General	Countries: Suriname	
Brazil	Rio Branco	Consulate-General	Countries: Suriname	
Brazil	Rio de Janeiro	Consulate-General	Countries: Suriname	
Brazil	São Paulo	Consulate-General	Countries: Suriname	
Canada	Ottawa	Embassy		
Canada	Montreal	Consulate-General		
Canada	Toronto	Consulate-General		
Canada	Vancouver	Consulate-General		
Chile	Santiago de Chile	Embassy		
Chile	Santiago de Chile	Consulate-General		
Chile	Antofagasta	Consulate-General		
Chile	Arica	Consulate-General		
Chile	Iquique	Consulate-General		
Colombia	Bogotá	Embassy		
Colombia	Bogotá	Consulate-General		
Colombia	Leticia	Consulate-General		
Colombia	Medellín	Consulate-General		
Costa Rica	San José	Embassy		
Cuba	Havana	Embassy		
Dominican Republic	Santo Domingo	Embassy	Countries: Haiti; Saint Kitts and Nevis	
Ecuador	Quito	Embassy		
Ecuador	Quito	Consulate-General		
Ecuador	Cuenca	Consulate-General		
Ecuador	Guayaquil	Consulate-General		
Ecuador	Loja	Consulate-General		
Ecuador	Machala	Consulate-General		
El Salvador	San Salvador	Embassy	Countries: Belize	
Guatemala	Guatemala City	Embassy		
Guyana	Georgetown	Embassy	Multilateral Organizations: Caribbean Community	
Honduras	Tegucigalpa	Embassy		
Mexico	Mexico City	Embassy		
Mexico	Mexico City	Consulate-General		
Nicaragua	Managua	Embassy		
Panama	Panama City	Embassy	Countries: Bahamas; Jamaica	
Paraguay	Asunción	Embassy		
Trinidad and Tobago	Port of Spain	Embassy	Countries: Barbados; Saint Lucia; Saint Vincent and the Grenadines	
United States	Washington, D.C.	Embassy		
United States	Washington, D.C.	Consulate-General		
United States	Atlanta	Consulate-General		
United States	Boston	Consulate-General		
United States	Chicago	Consulate-General		
United States	Dallas	Consulate-General		
United States	Denver	Consulate-General		
United States	Hartford	Consulate-General		
United States	Houston	Consulate-General		
United States	Los Angeles	Consulate-General		
United States	Miami	Consulate-General		
United States	New York City	Consulate-General		
United States	Orlando	Consulate-General		
United States	Paterson	Consulate-General		
United States	Phoenix	Consulate-General		
United States	Salt Lake City	Consulate-General		
United States	San Francisco	Consulate-General		
Uruguay	Montevideo	Embassy	Multilateral Organizations: ALADI; Mercosur	
Venezuela	Caracas	Consulate-General		

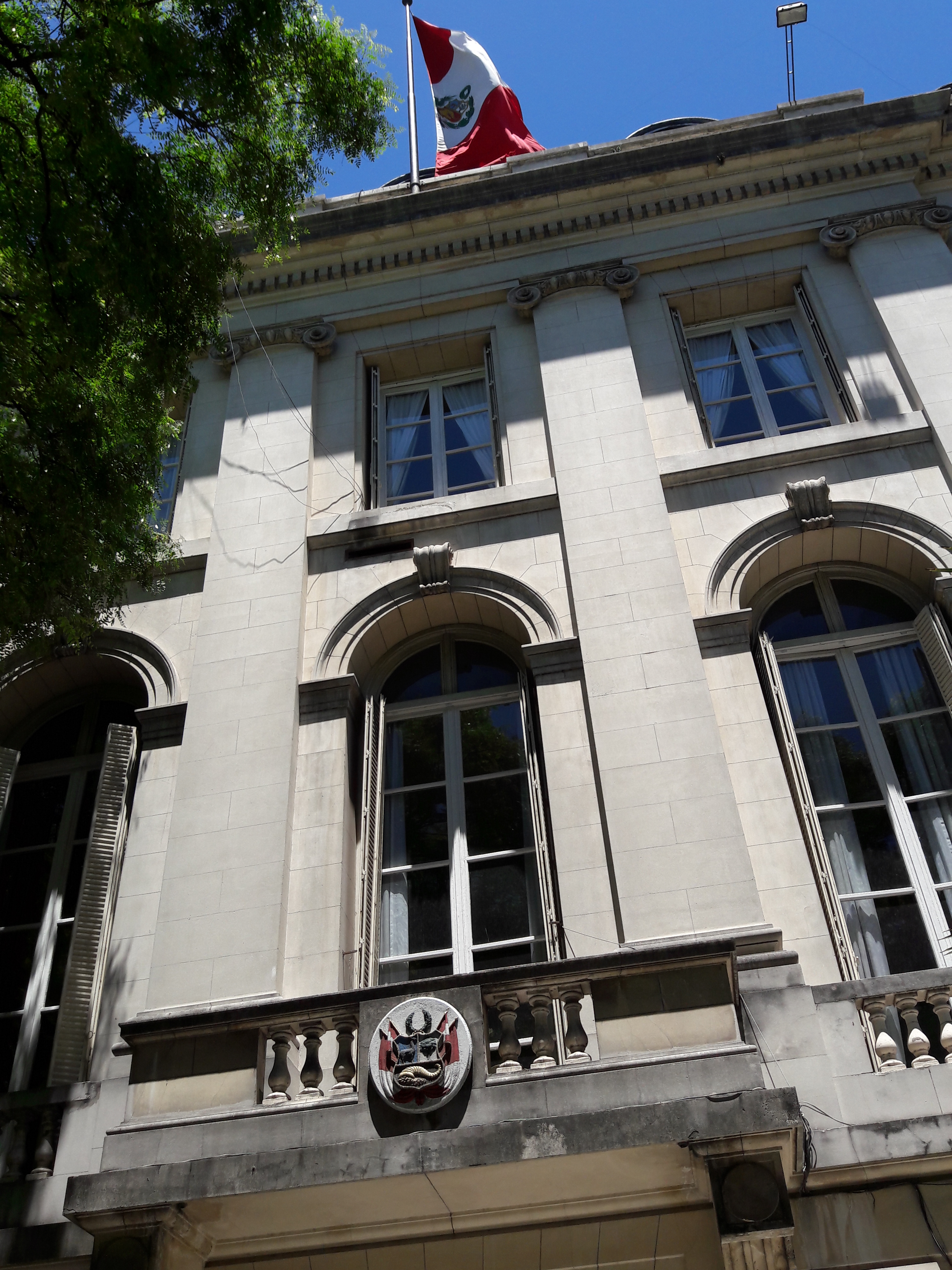
Embassy in Buenos Aires

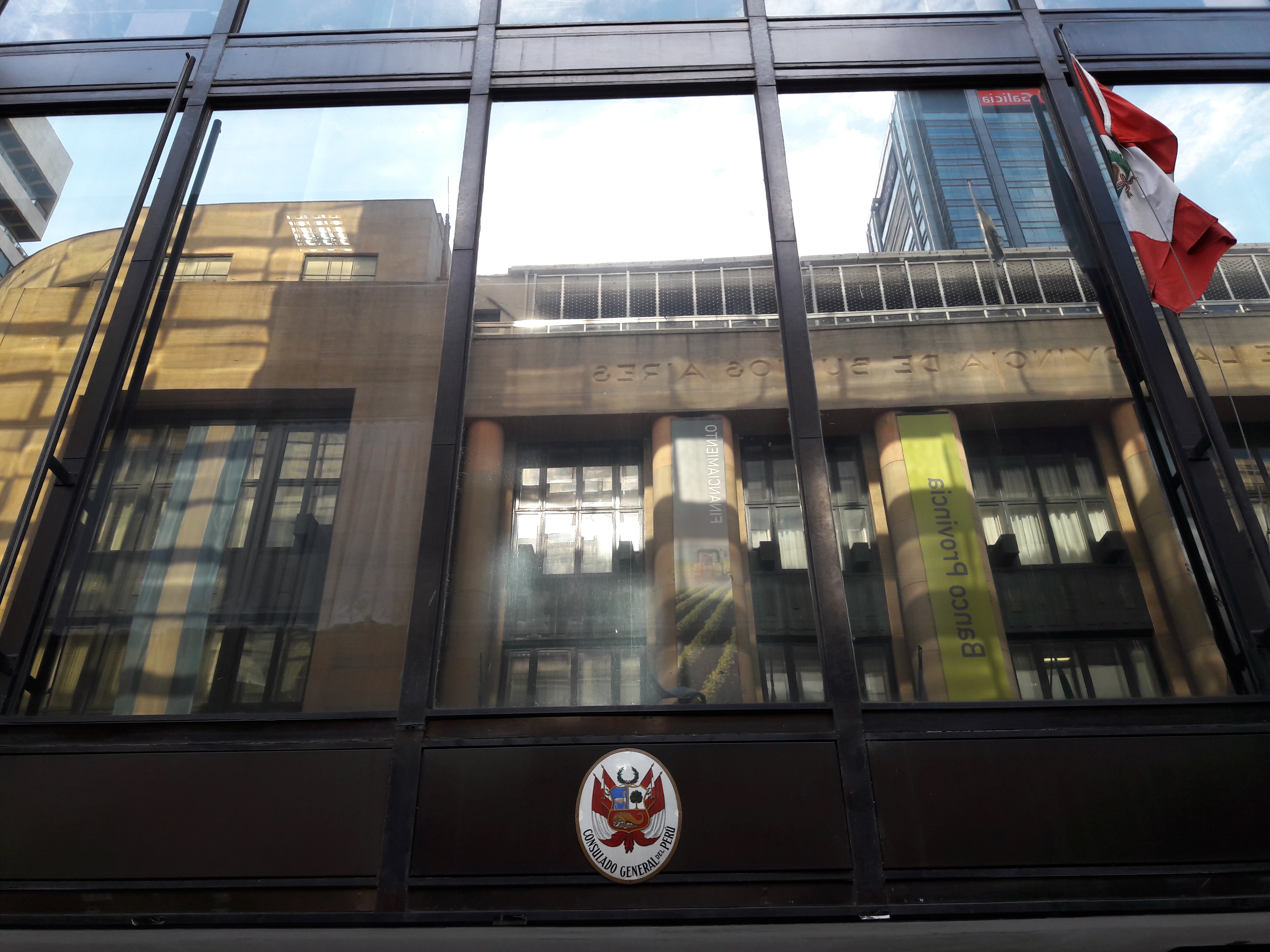
Consulate-General in Buenos Aires

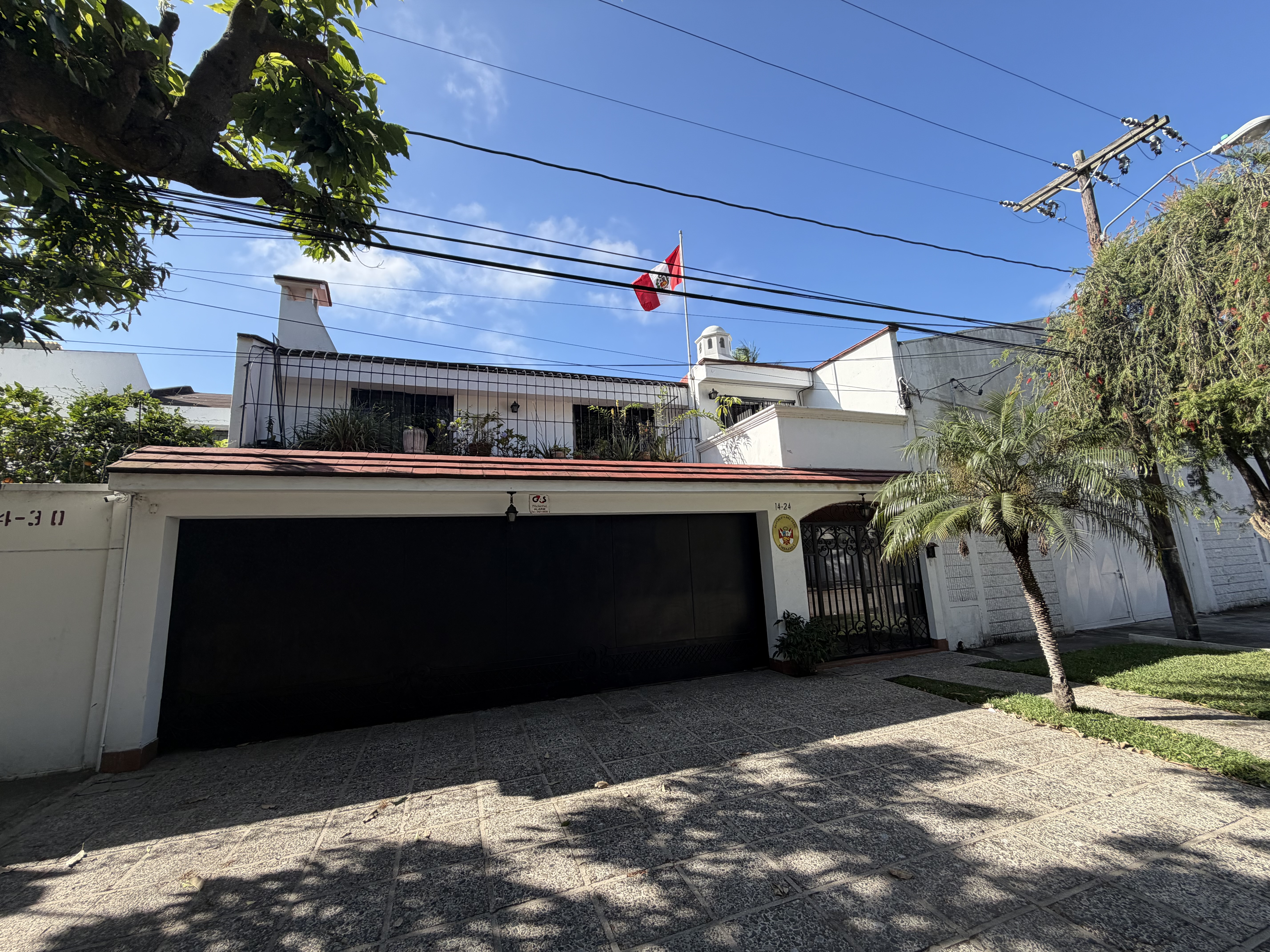
Embassy in Guatemala City

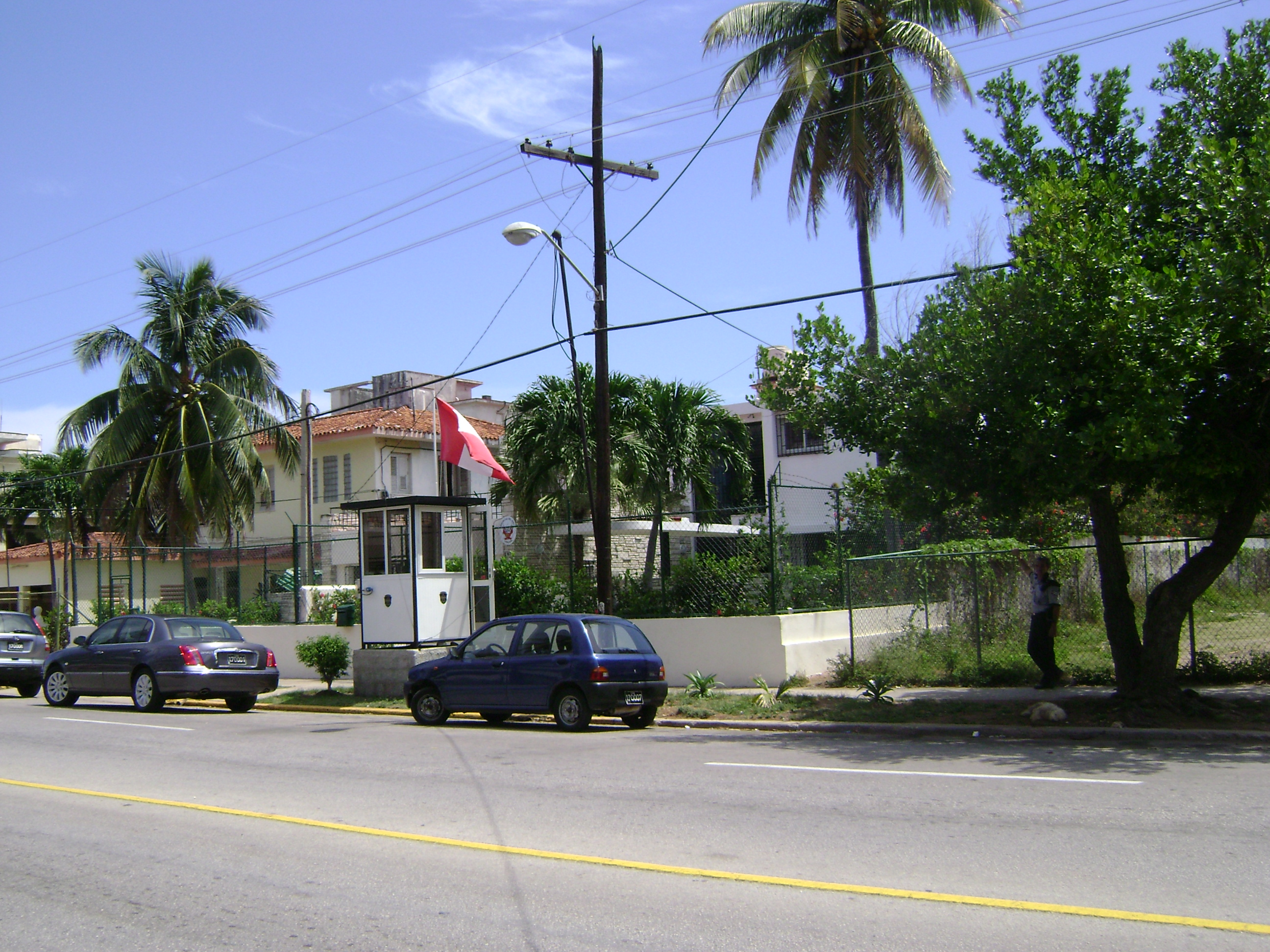
Embassy in Havana

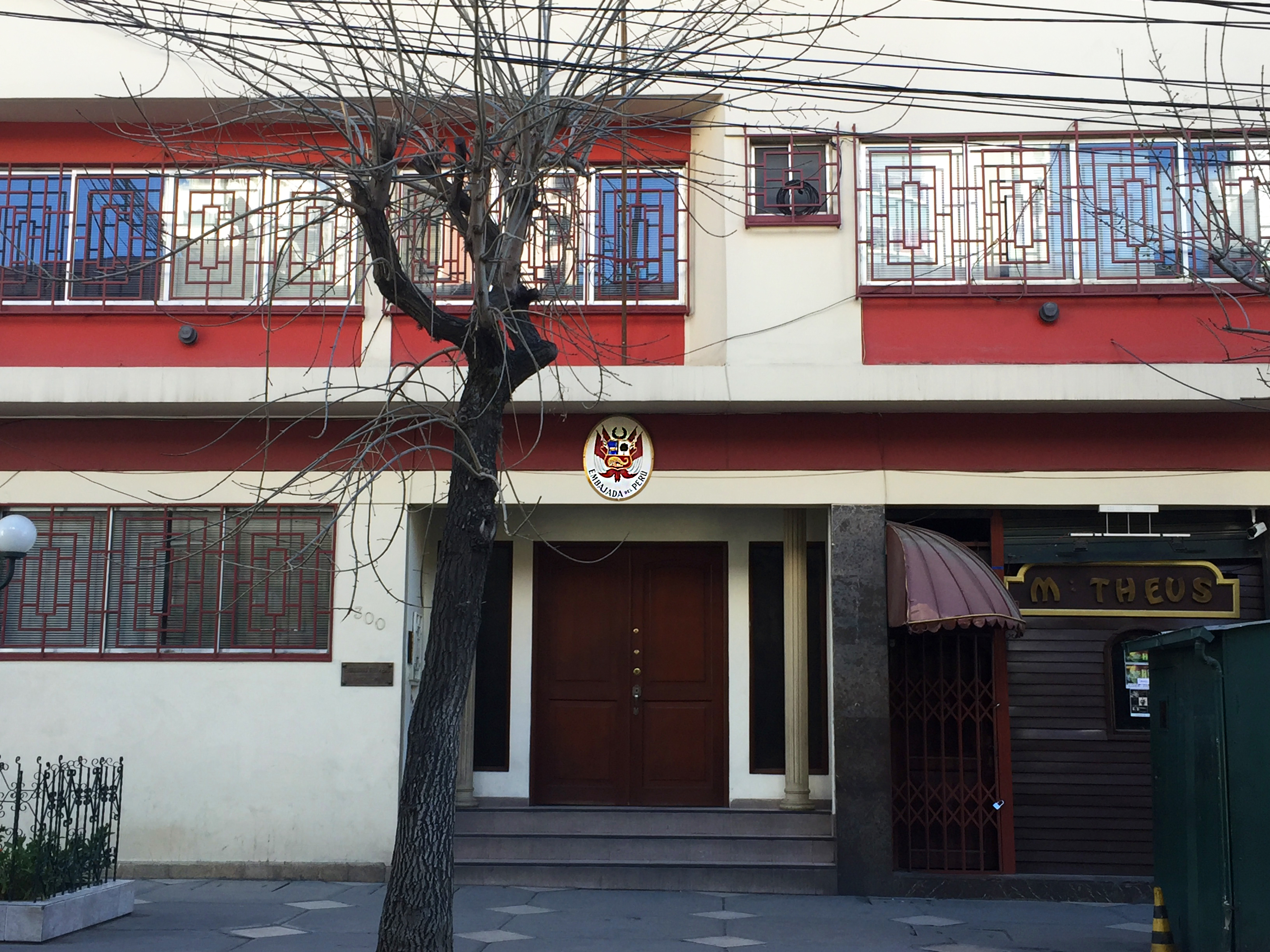
Embassy in La Paz

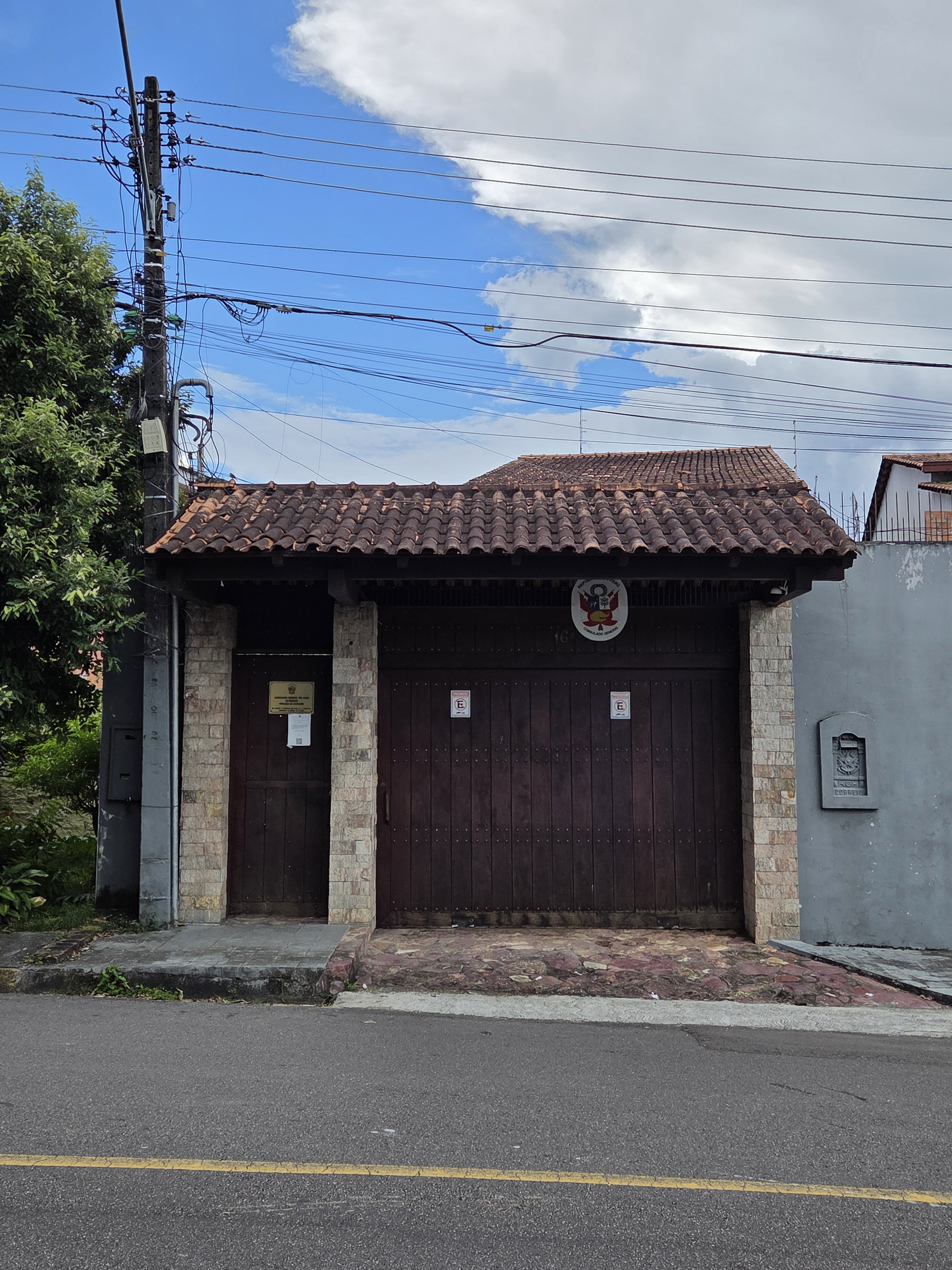
Consulate-General in Manaus

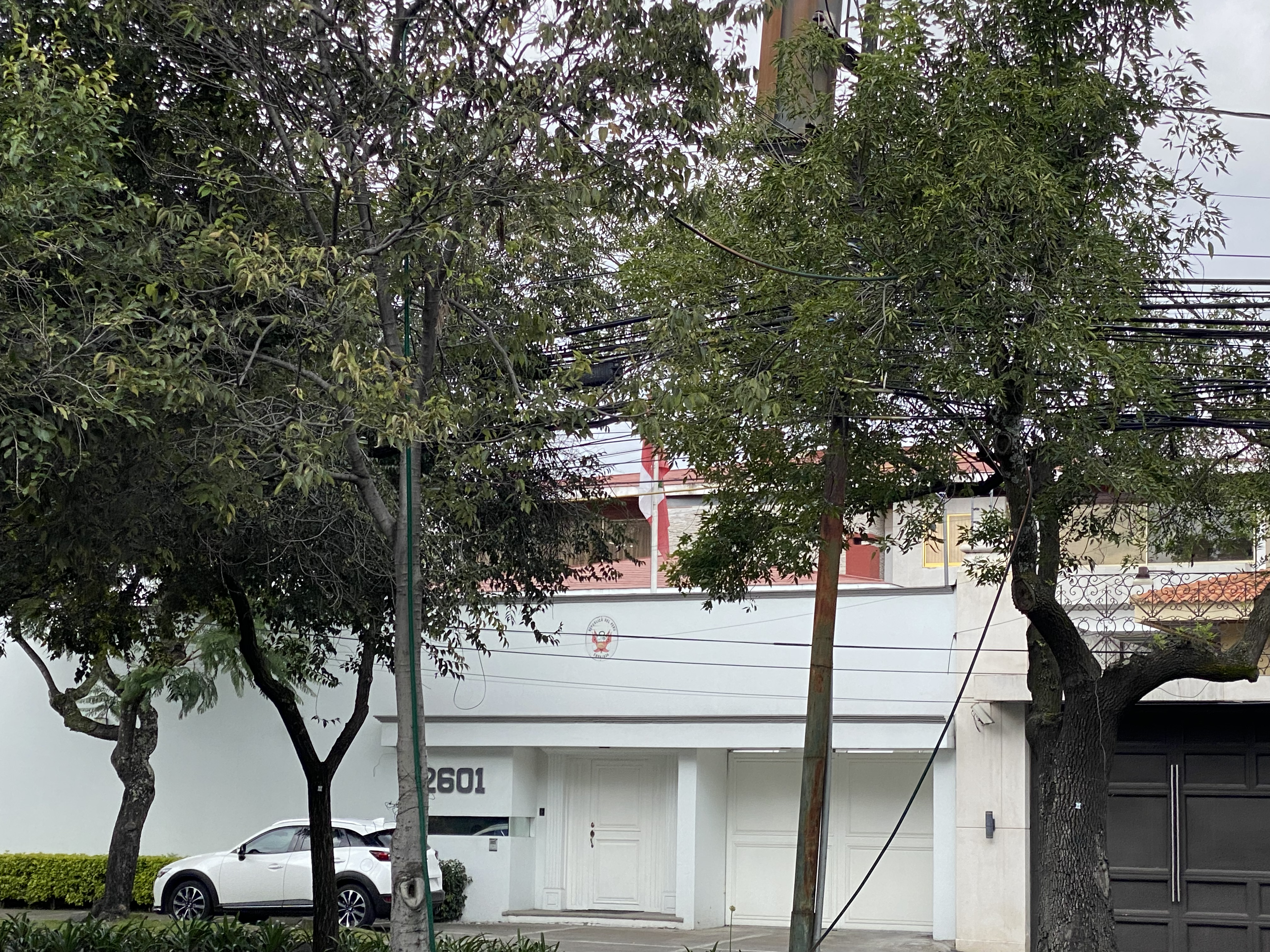
Embassy in Mexico City

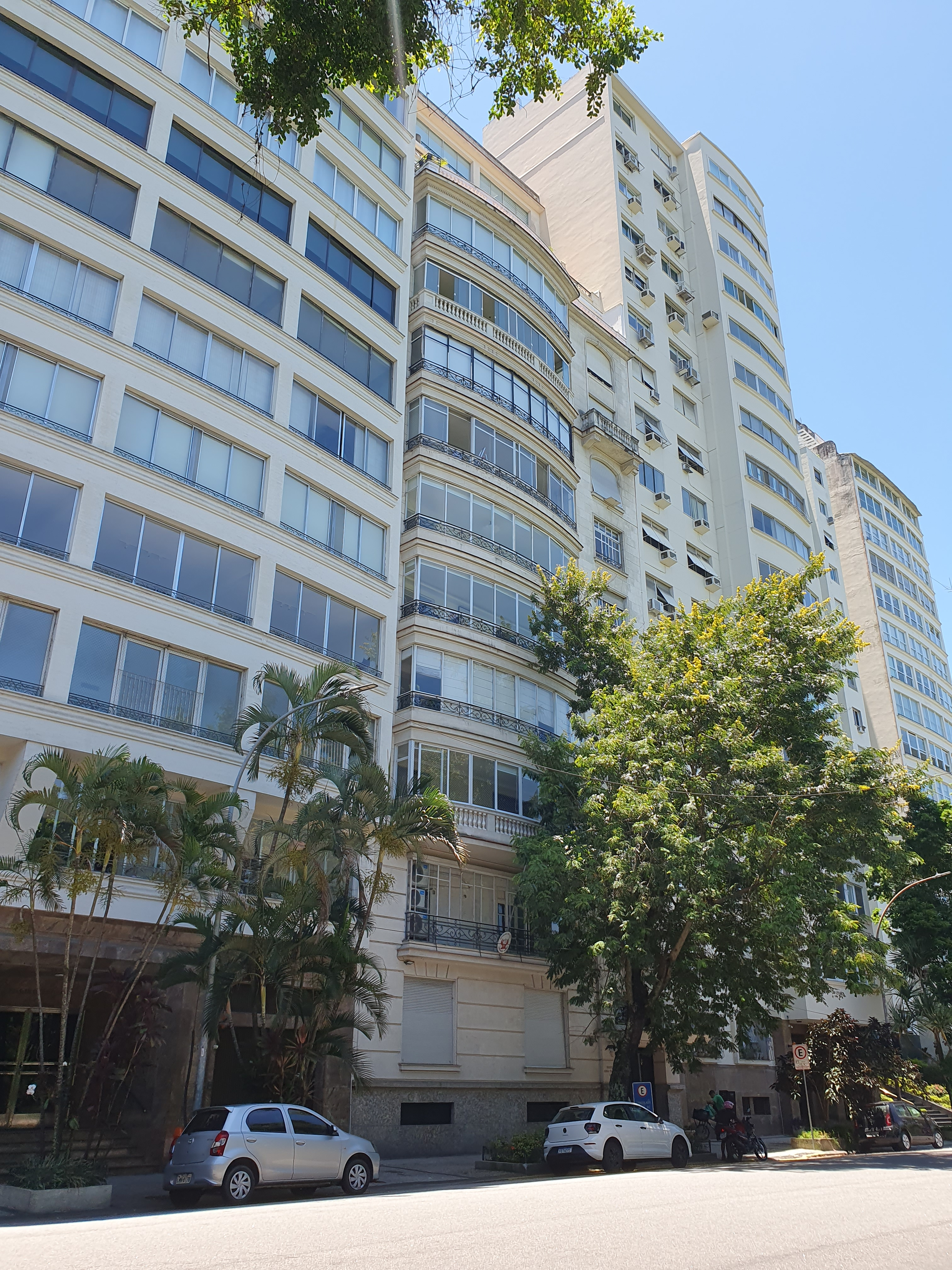
Building hosting the Consulate-General in Rio de Janeiro

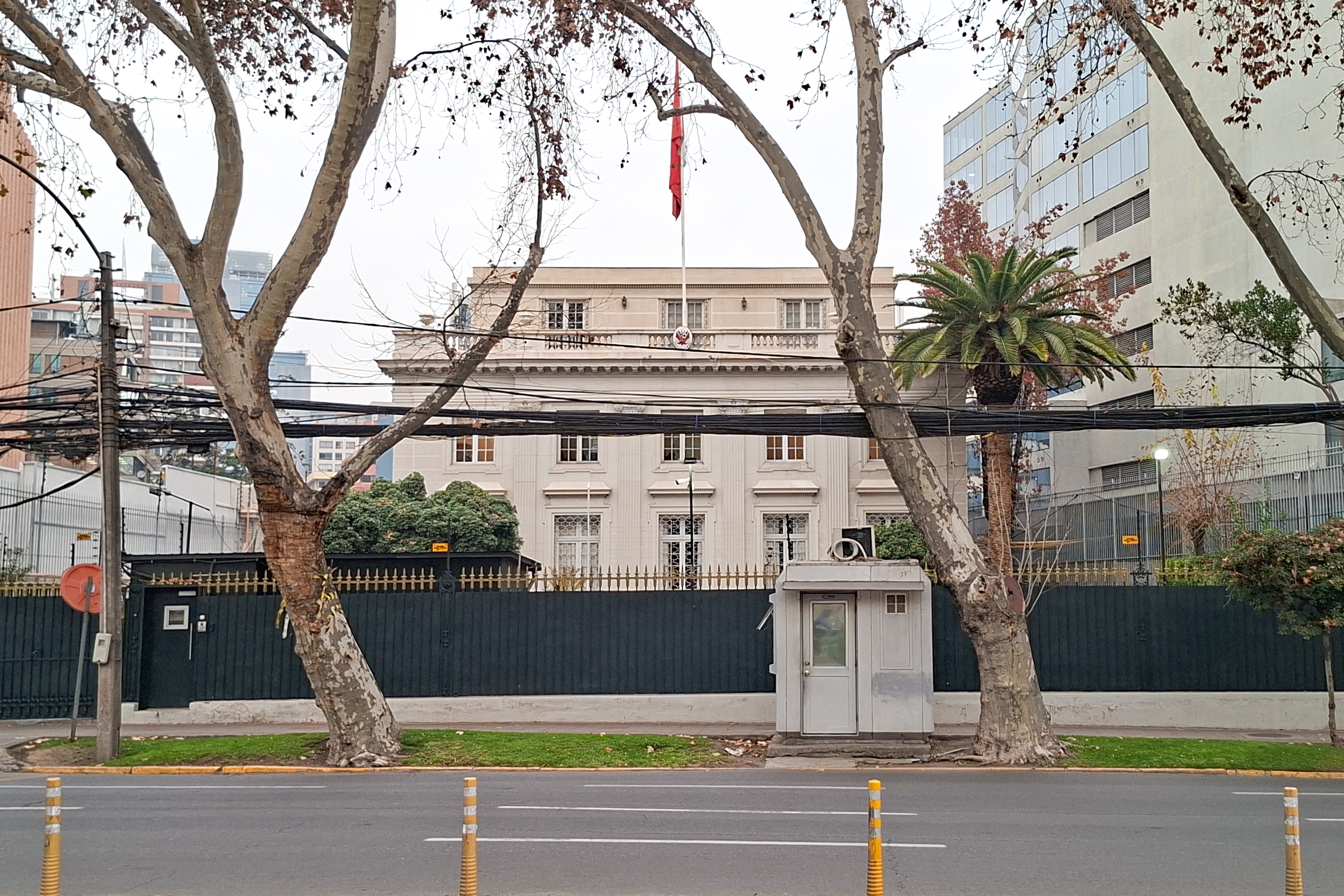
Embassy in Santiago de Chile

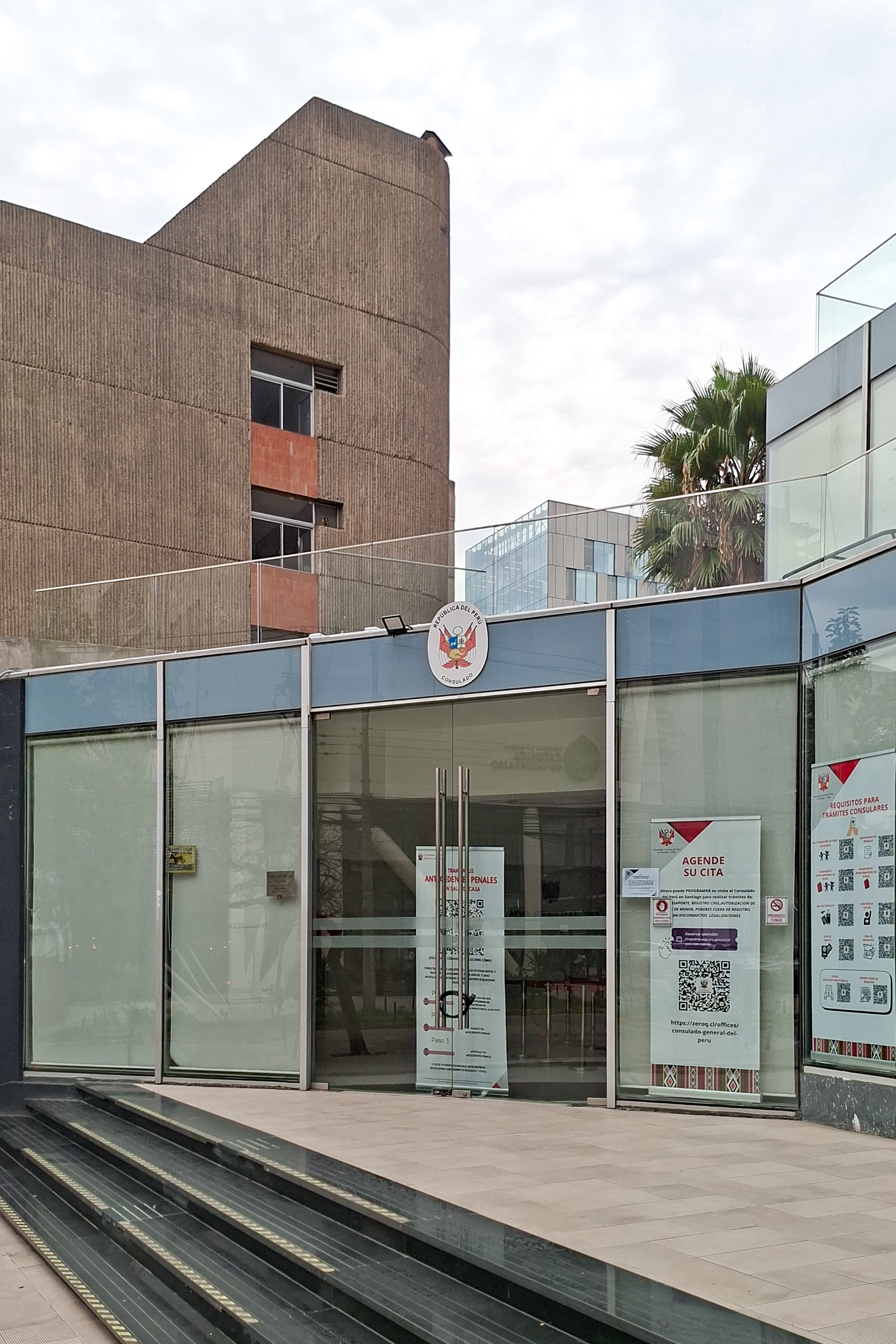
Consulate-General in Santiago de Chile

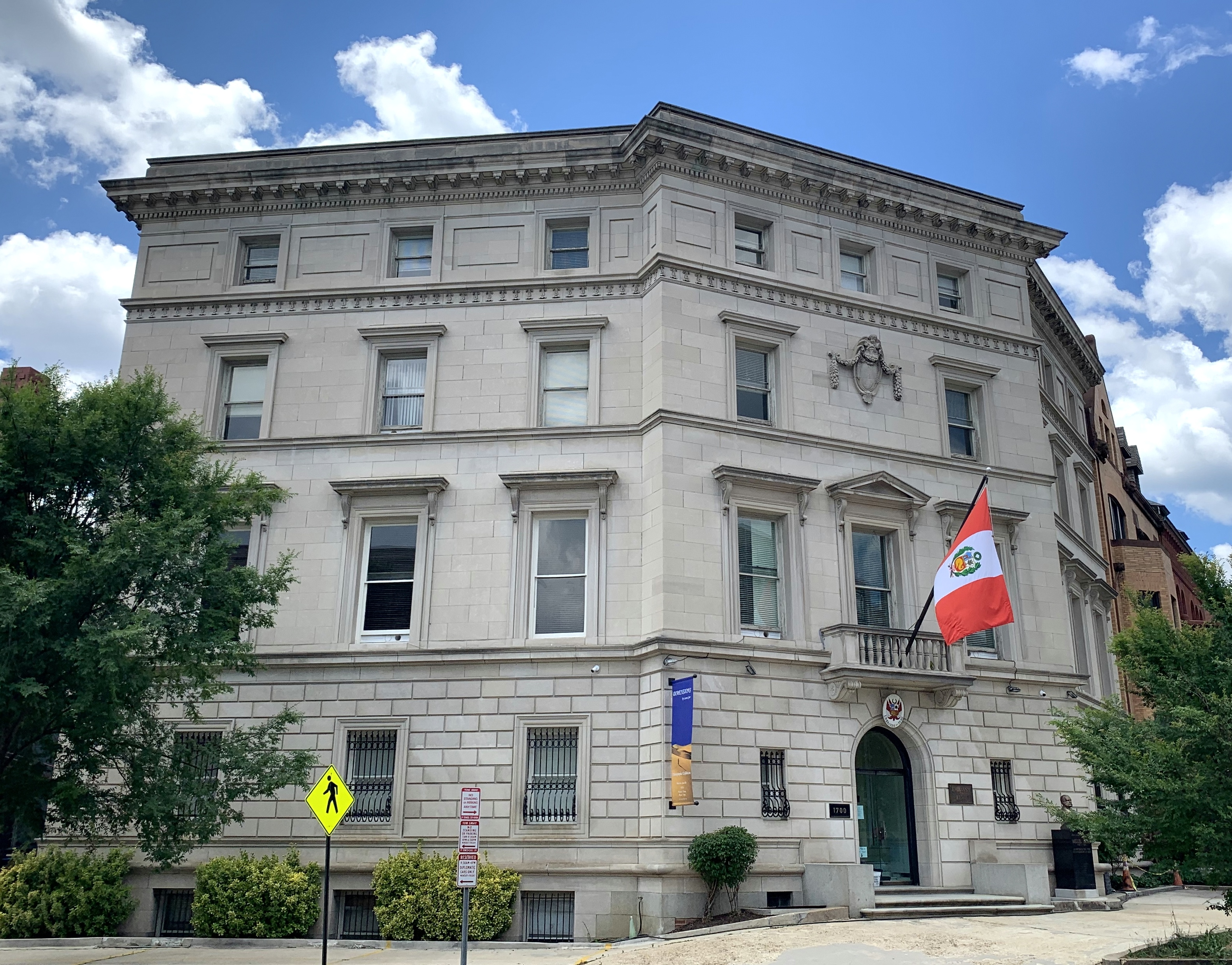
Embassy in Washington, D.C.

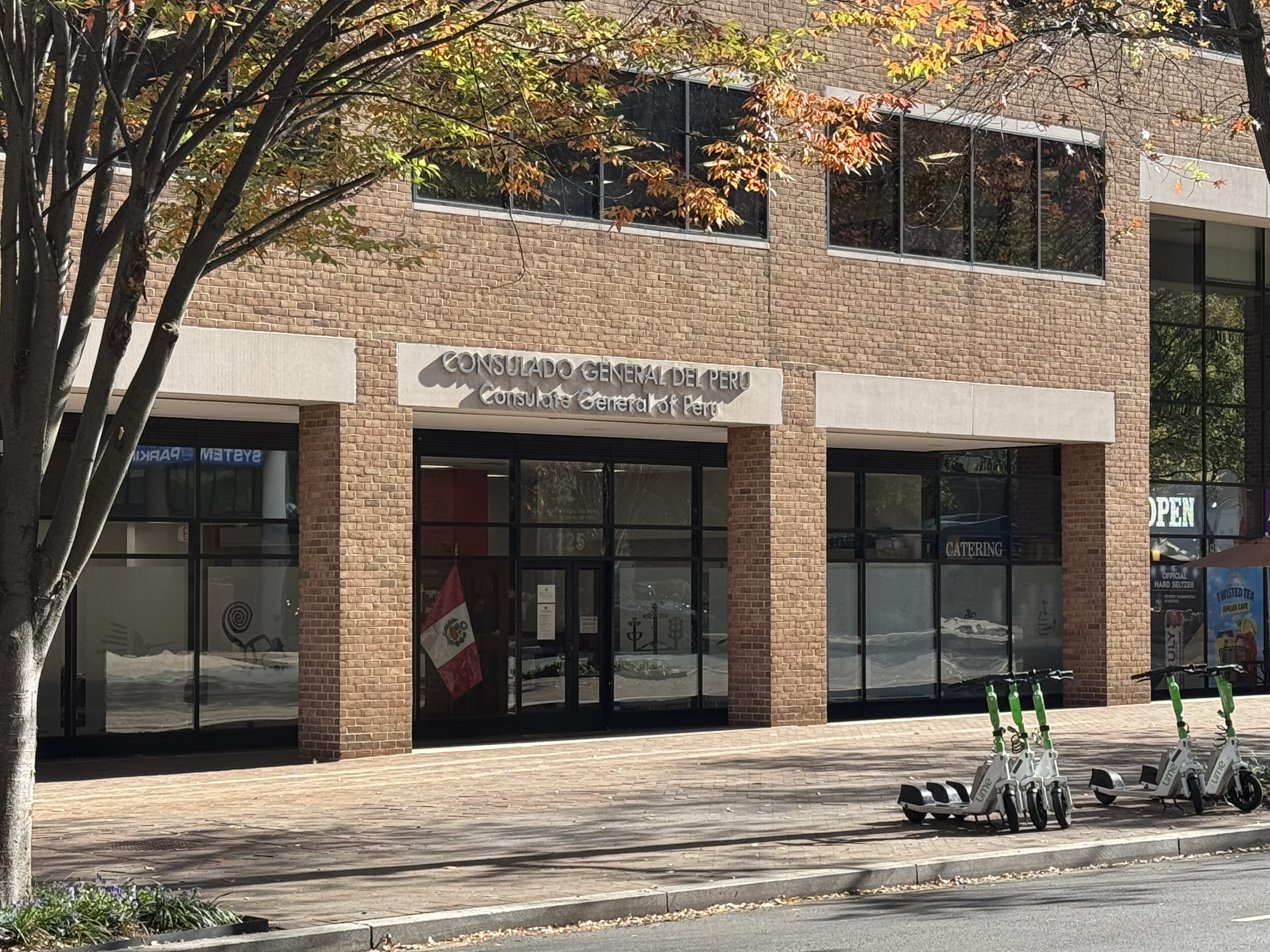
Consulate-General in Washington, D.C.

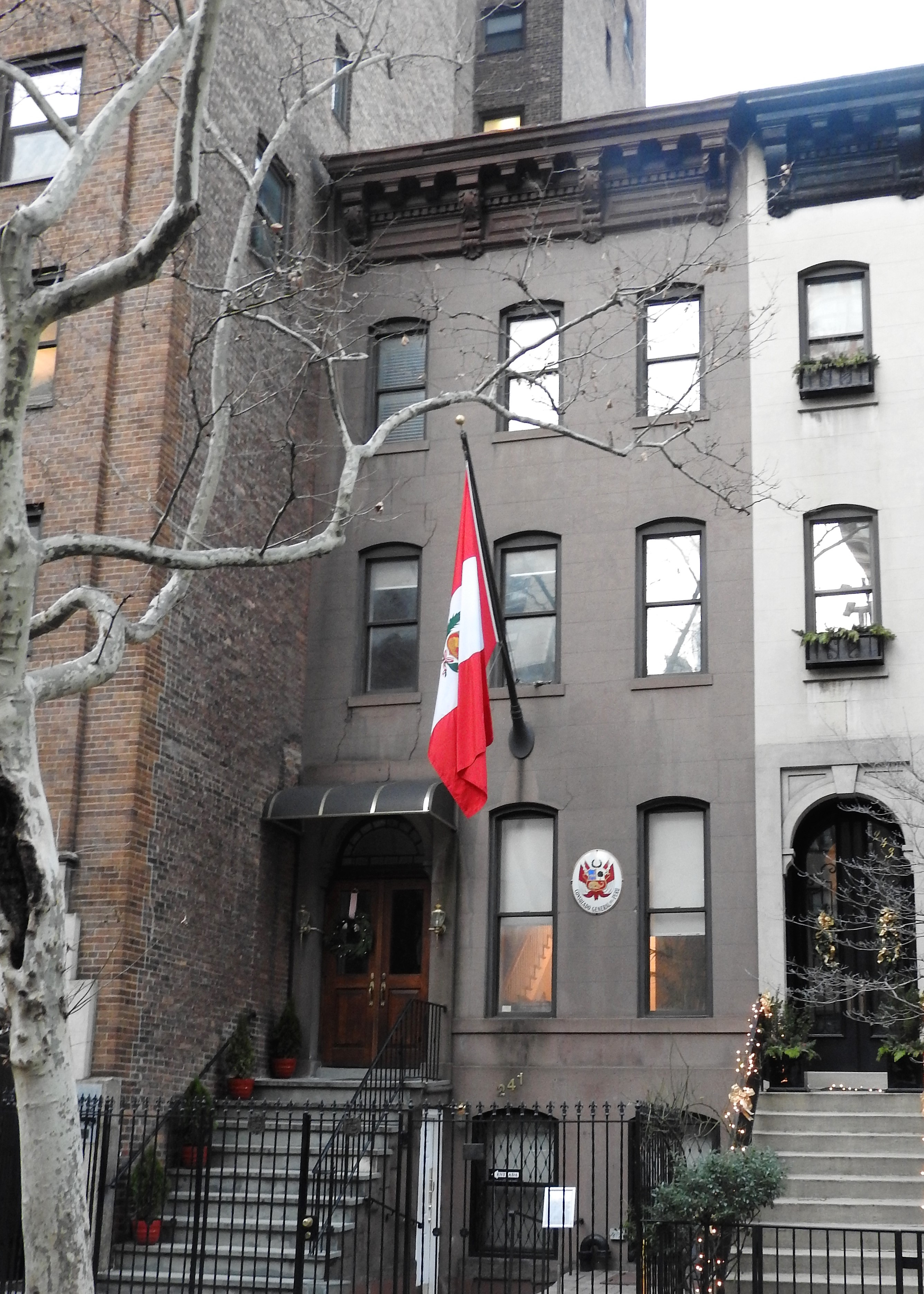
Consulate-General in New York

=== Asia ===
Host country	Host city	Mission	Concurrent accreditation	Ref.
China	Beijing	Embassy	Countries: Mongolia; Pakistan	
China	Guangzhou	Consulate-General	Countries: Mongolia; Pakistan	
China	Hong Kong	Consulate-General	Countries: Mongolia; Pakistan	
China	Shanghai	Consulate-General	Countries: Mongolia; Pakistan	
India	New Delhi	Embassy	Countries: Bangladesh; Maldives; Nepal; Sri Lanka	
Indonesia	Jakarta	Embassy	Countries: Timor-Leste; Multilateral Organizations: Association of Southeast Asian Nations	
Israel	Tel Aviv	Embassy		
Japan	Tokyo	Embassy		
Japan	Tokyo	Consulate-General		
Japan	Nagoya	Consulate-General		
Kuwait	Kuwait City	Embassy		
Malaysia	Kuala Lumpur	Embassy	Countries: Brunei; Cambodia	
Philippines	Manila	Embassy		
Qatar	Doha	Embassy		
Saudi Arabia	Riyadh	Embassy	Countries: Bahrain; Oman	
Singapore	Singapore	Embassy		
South Korea	Seoul	Embassy		
Republic of China (Taiwan)	Taipei	Commercial Office		
Thailand	Bangkok	Embassy	Countries: Myanmar	
Turkey	Ankara	Embassy	Countries: Azerbaijan; Georgia; Iran	
United Arab Emirates	Abu Dhabi	Embassy		
United Arab Emirates	Dubai	Consulate-General		
Vietnam	Hanoi	Embassy	Countries: Laos	

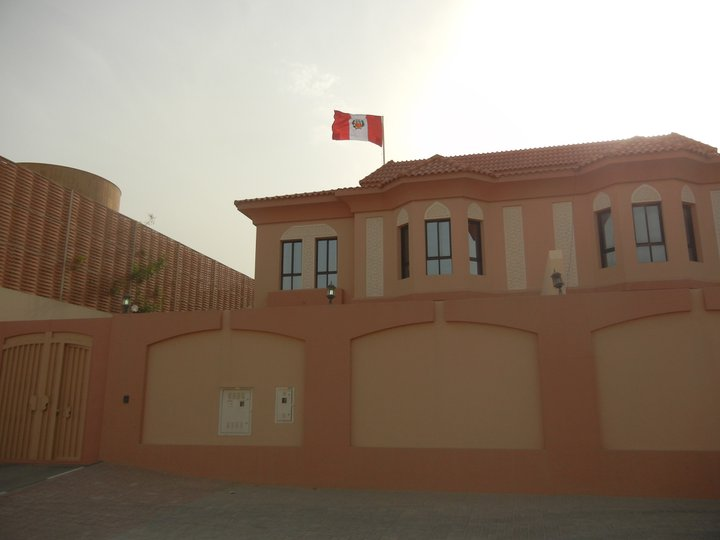
Embassy in Doha

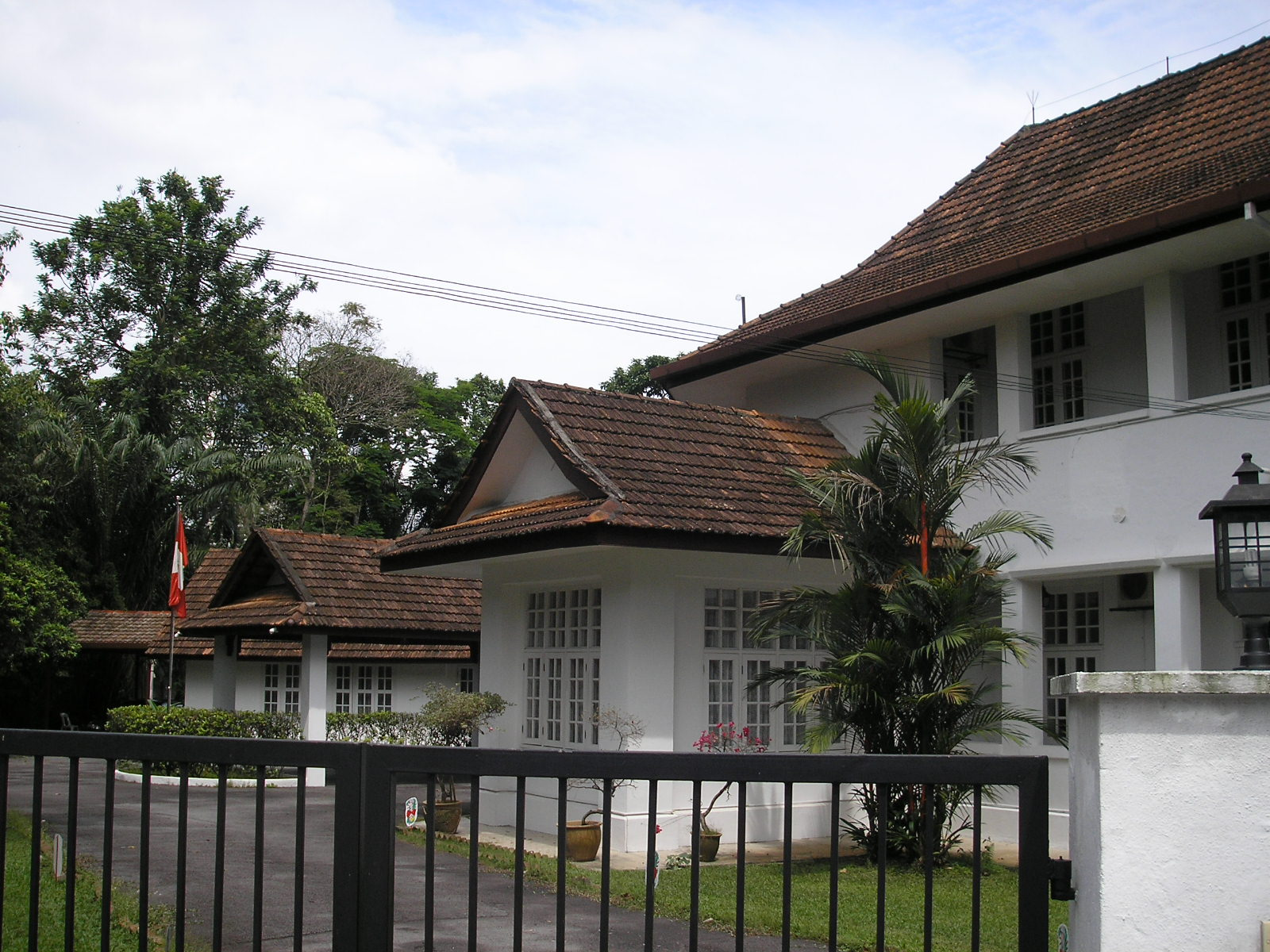
Embassy in Kuala Lumpur

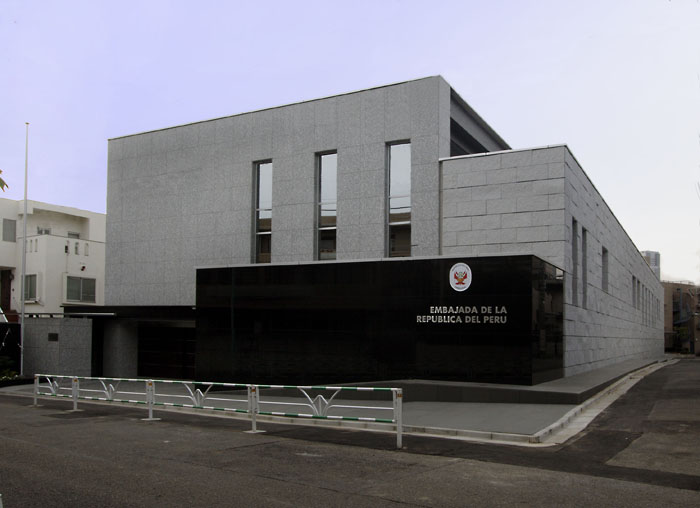
Embassy in Tokyo

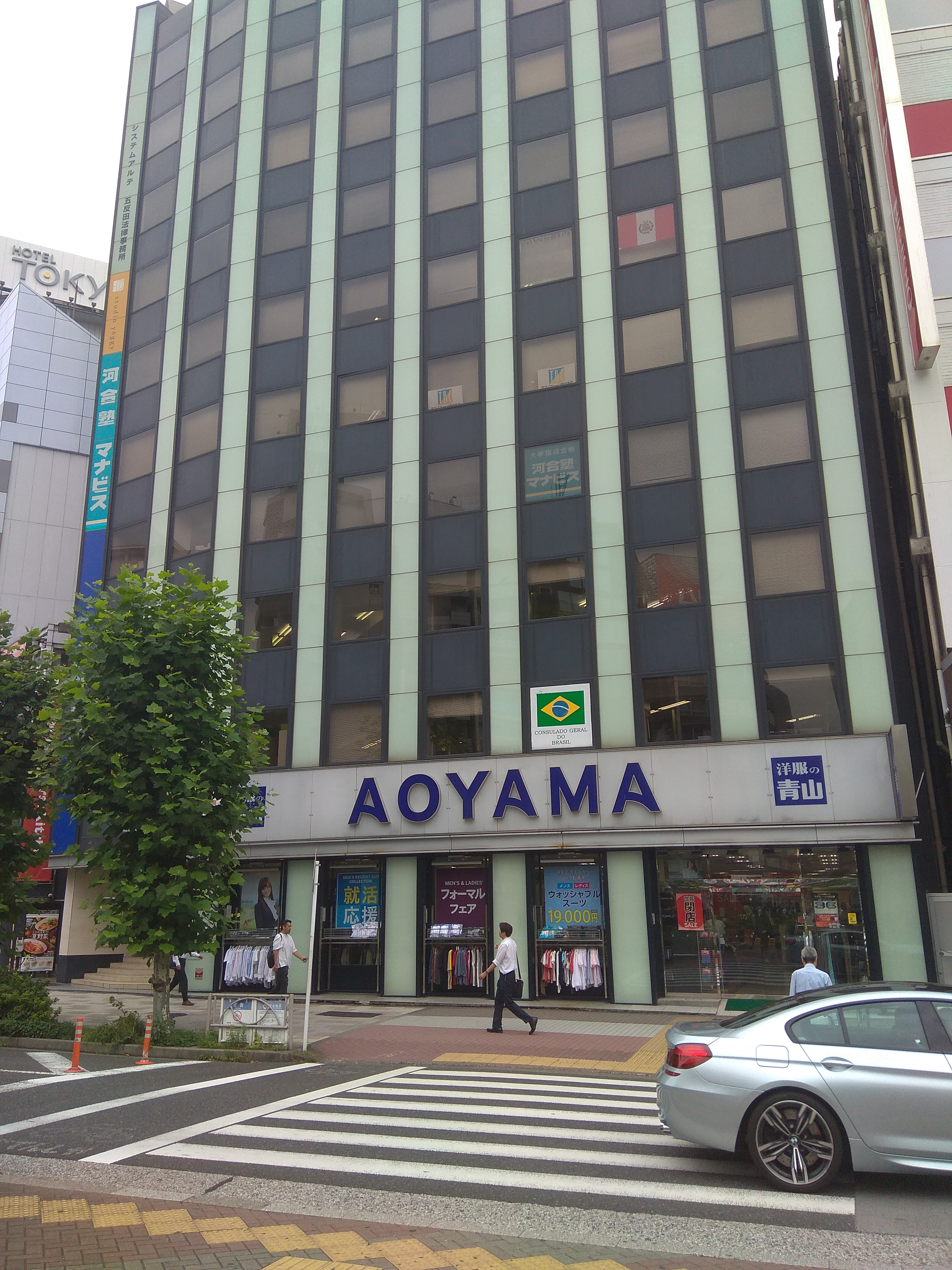
Building hosting the consulate-general in Tokyo

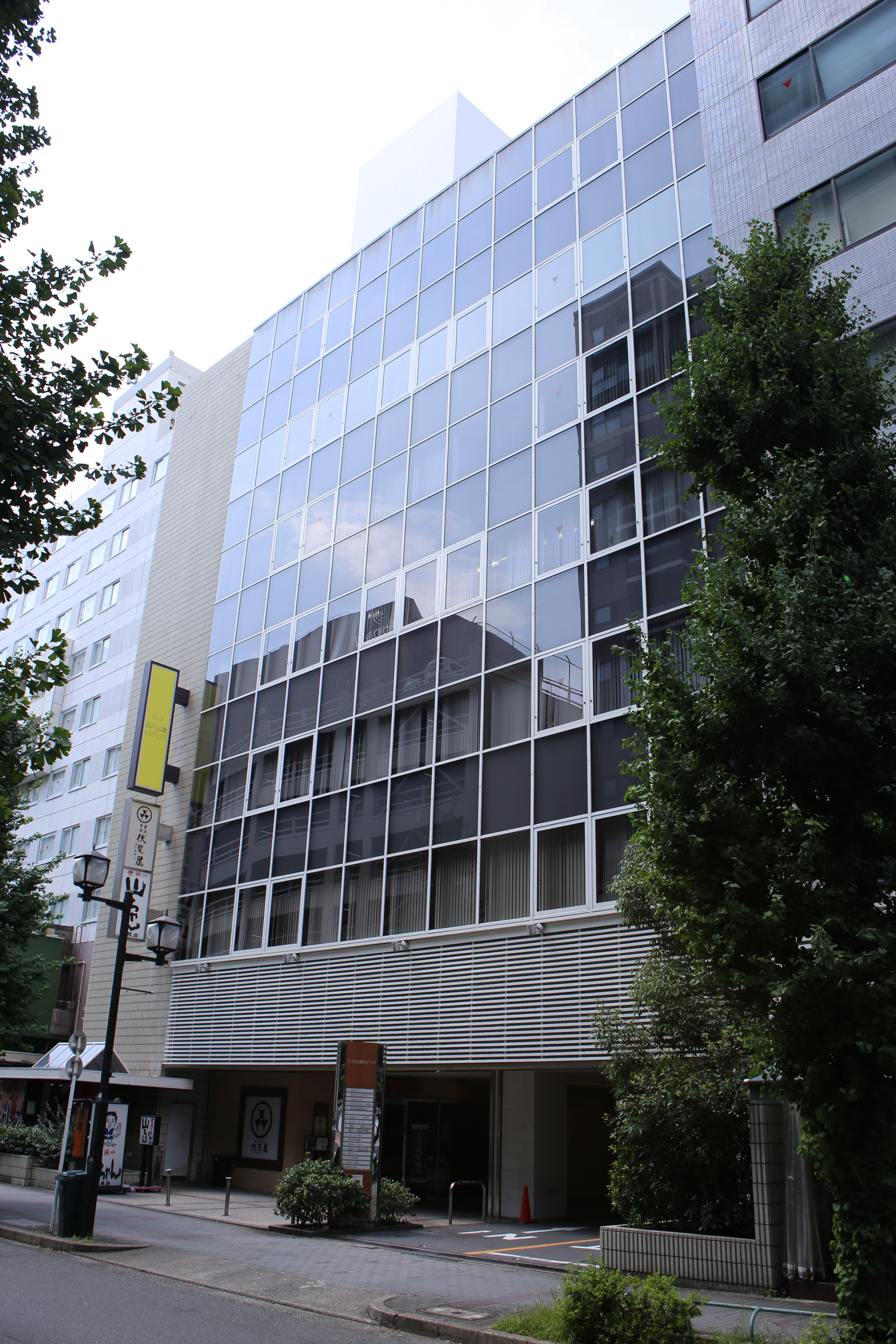
Building hosting the consulate-general in Nagoya

=== Europe ===
Host country	Host city	Mission	Concurrent accreditation	Ref.
Austria	Vienna	Embassy	Countries: Slovakia; Slovenia; Multilateral Organizations: United Nations; International Atomic Energy Agency; UNIDO; United Nations Office on Drugs and Crime	
Belgium	Brussels	Embassy	Countries: Luxembourg; Multilateral Organizations: European Union	
Belgium	Brussels	Consulate-General	Countries: Luxembourg; Multilateral Organizations: European Union	
Czech Republic	Prague	Embassy		
Denmark	Copenhagen	Embassy		
Finland	Helsinki	Embassy	Countries: Estonia; Latvia; Lithuania	
France	Paris	Embassy	Countries: Monaco	
France	Paris	Consulate-General	Countries: Monaco	
Germany	Berlin	Embassy		
Germany	Frankfurt	Consulate-General		
Germany	Hamburg	Consulate-General		
Germany	Munich	Consulate-General		
Greece	Athens	Embassy	Countries: Albania; Bulgaria; Cyprus	
Holy See	Rome (Note: The Peruvian Embassy to the Holy See is located outside Vatican territory in Rome.)	Embassy	Sovereign Entity: Sovereign Military Order of Malta	
Hungary	Budapest	Embassy	Countries: Bosnia and Herzegovina; Croatia; Serbia; Montenegro	
Ireland	Dublin	Embassy		
Italy	Rome	Embassy	Countries: Malta; San Marino; Multilateral Organizations: Food and Agriculture Organization; International Fund for Agricultural Development; World Food Programme	
Italy	Rome	Consulate-General	Countries: Malta; San Marino; Multilateral Organizations: Food and Agriculture Organization; International Fund for Agricultural Development; World Food Programme	
Italy	Florence	Consulate-General	Countries: Malta; San Marino; Multilateral Organizations: Food and Agriculture Organization; International Fund for Agricultural Development; World Food Programme	
Italy	Genoa	Consulate-General	Countries: Malta; San Marino; Multilateral Organizations: Food and Agriculture Organization; International Fund for Agricultural Development; World Food Programme	
Italy	Milan	Consulate-General	Countries: Malta; San Marino; Multilateral Organizations: Food and Agriculture Organization; International Fund for Agricultural Development; World Food Programme	
Italy	Turin	Consulate-General	Countries: Malta; San Marino; Multilateral Organizations: Food and Agriculture Organization; International Fund for Agricultural Development; World Food Programme	
Netherlands	The Hague	Embassy	Multilateral Organizations: Organisation for the Prohibition of Chemical Weapons	
Netherlands	Amsterdam	Consulate-General	Multilateral Organizations: Organisation for the Prohibition of Chemical Weapons	
Norway	Oslo	Embassy	Countries: Iceland	
Poland	Warsaw	Embassy	Countries: Ukraine	
Portugal	Lisbon	Embassy		
Romania	Bucharest	Embassy	Countries: Croatia; Moldova; North Macedonia	
Russia	Moscow	Embassy	Countries: Armenia; Belarus; Kazakhstan	
Spain	Madrid	Embassy	Countries: Andorra; Multilateral Organizations: World Tourism Organization	
Spain	Madrid	Consulate-General	Countries: Andorra; Multilateral Organizations: World Tourism Organization	
Spain	Barcelona	Consulate-General	Countries: Andorra; Multilateral Organizations: World Tourism Organization	
Spain	Bilbao	Consulate-General	Countries: Andorra; Multilateral Organizations: World Tourism Organization	
Spain	Seville	Consulate-General	Countries: Andorra; Multilateral Organizations: World Tourism Organization	
Spain	Valencia	Consulate-General	Countries: Andorra; Multilateral Organizations: World Tourism Organization	
Sweden	Stockholm	Embassy		
Switzerland	Bern	Embassy	Countries: Liechtenstein	
Switzerland	Geneva	Consulate-General	Countries: Liechtenstein	
United Kingdom	London	Embassy	Multilateral Organizations: International Maritime Organization; International Whaling Commission	
United Kingdom	London	Consulate-General	Multilateral Organizations: International Maritime Organization; International Whaling Commission	

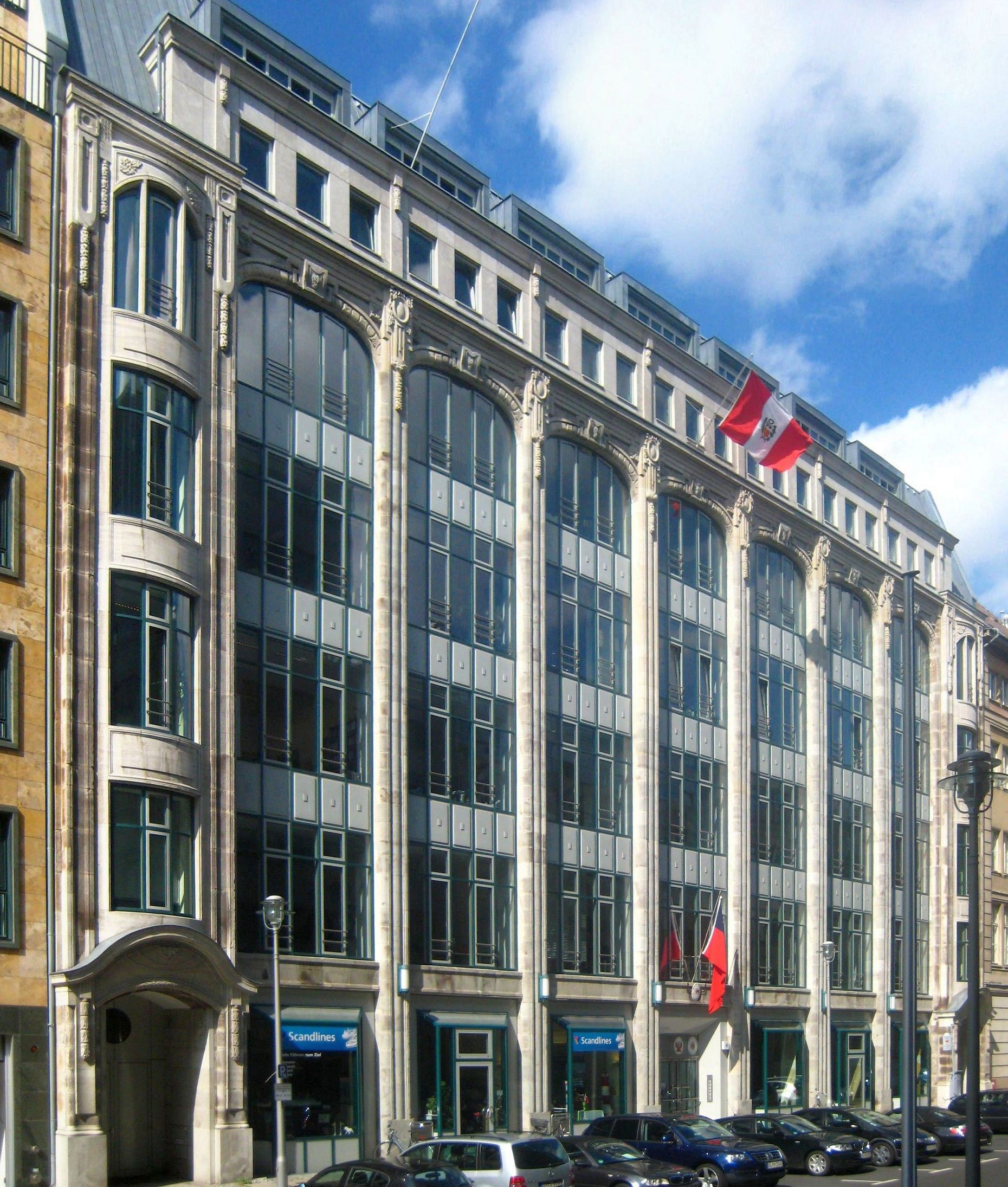
Embassy in Berlin

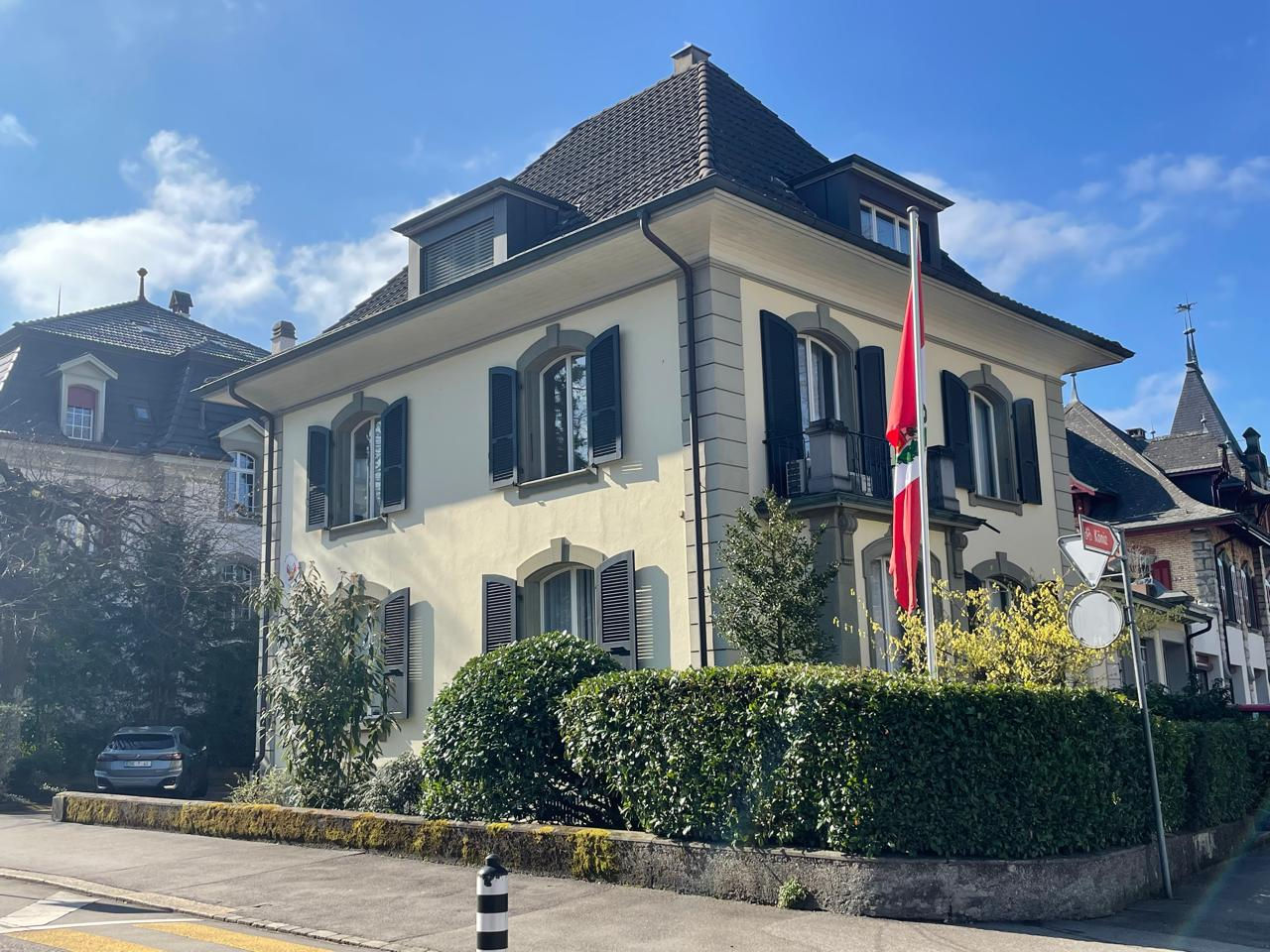
Embassy in Bern

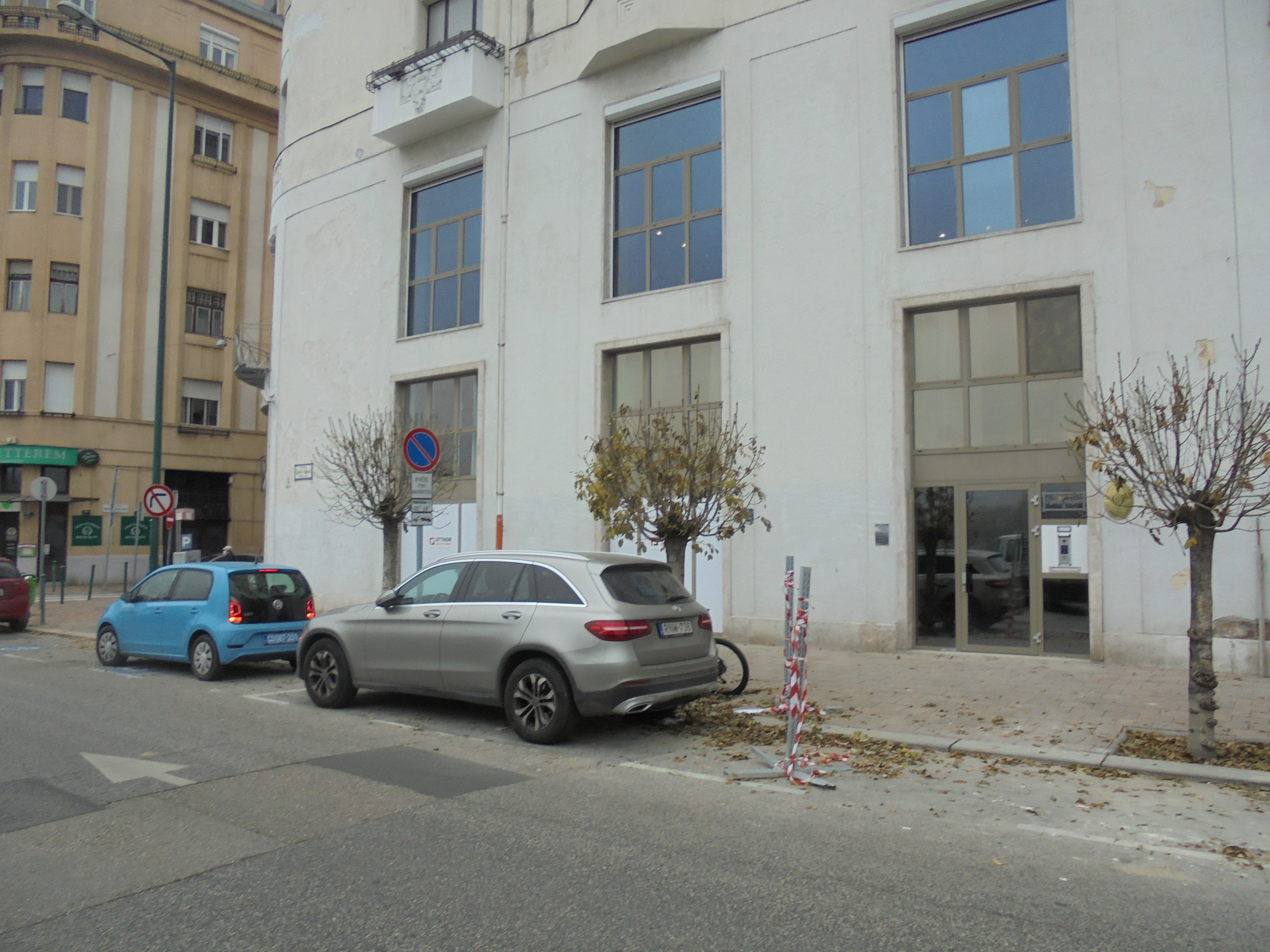
Embassy in Budapest

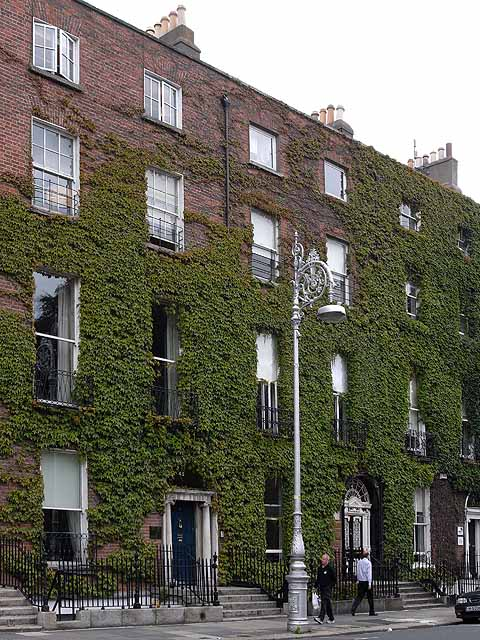
Embassy in Dublin

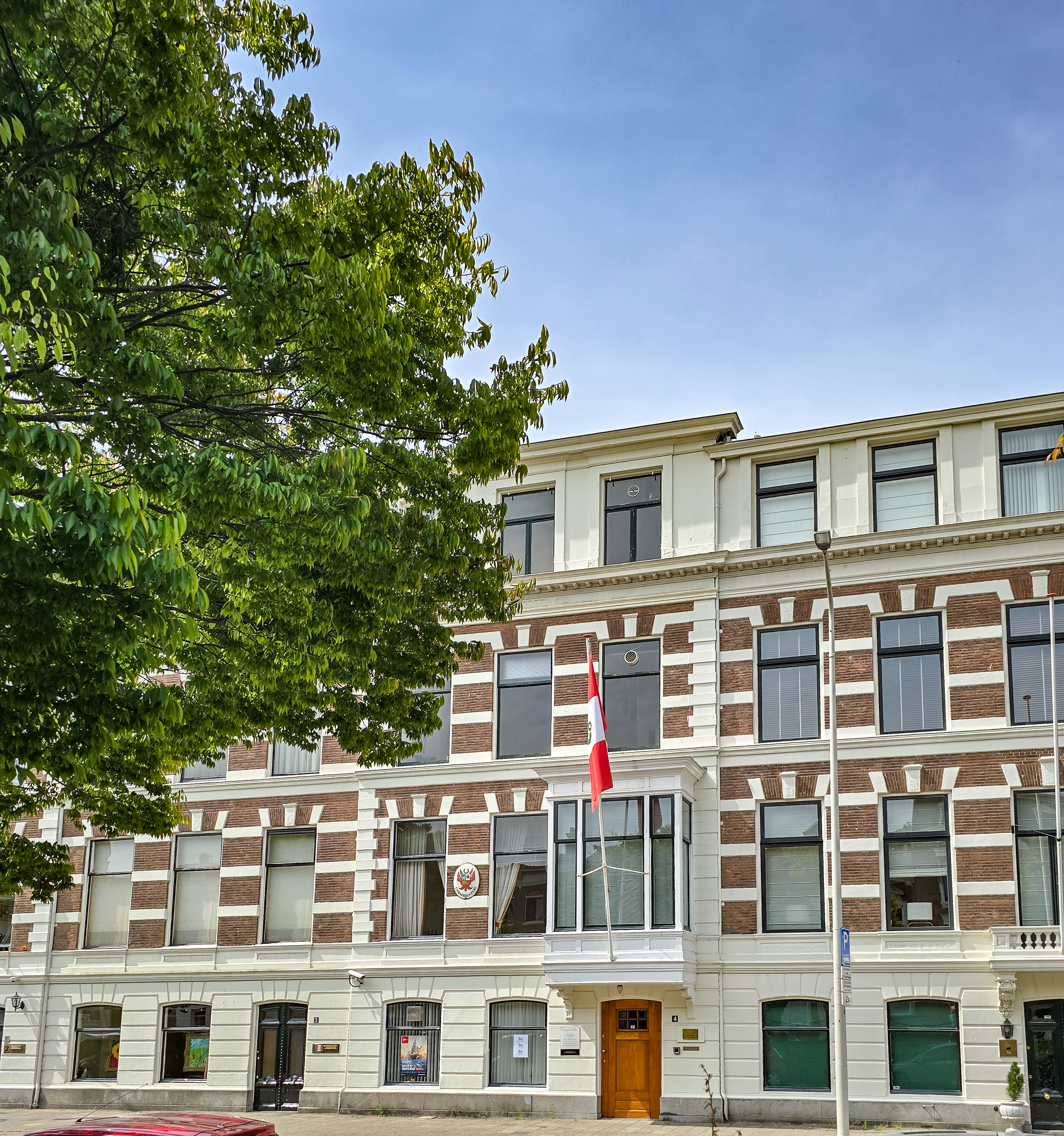
Embassy in The Hague

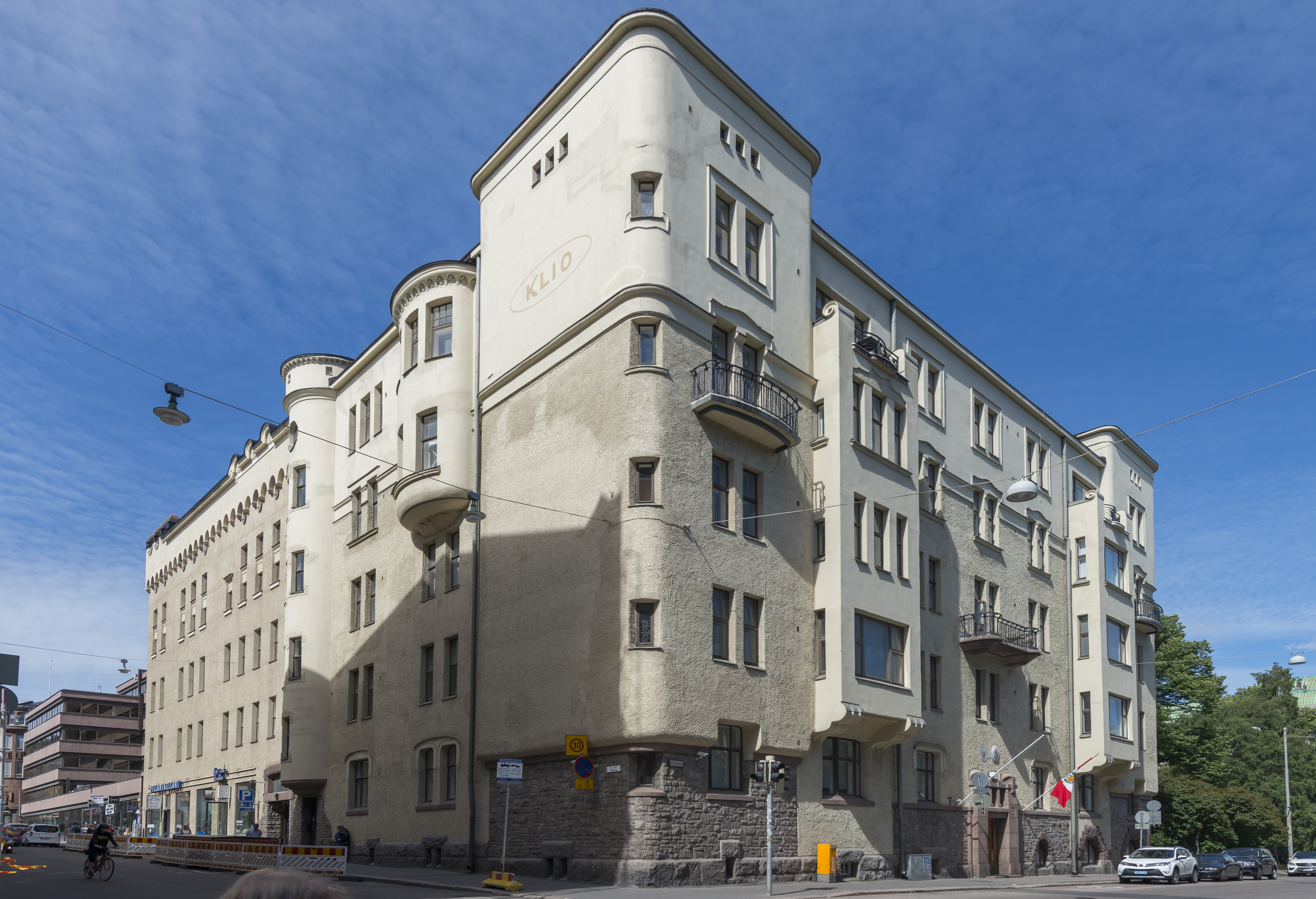
Embassy in Helsinki

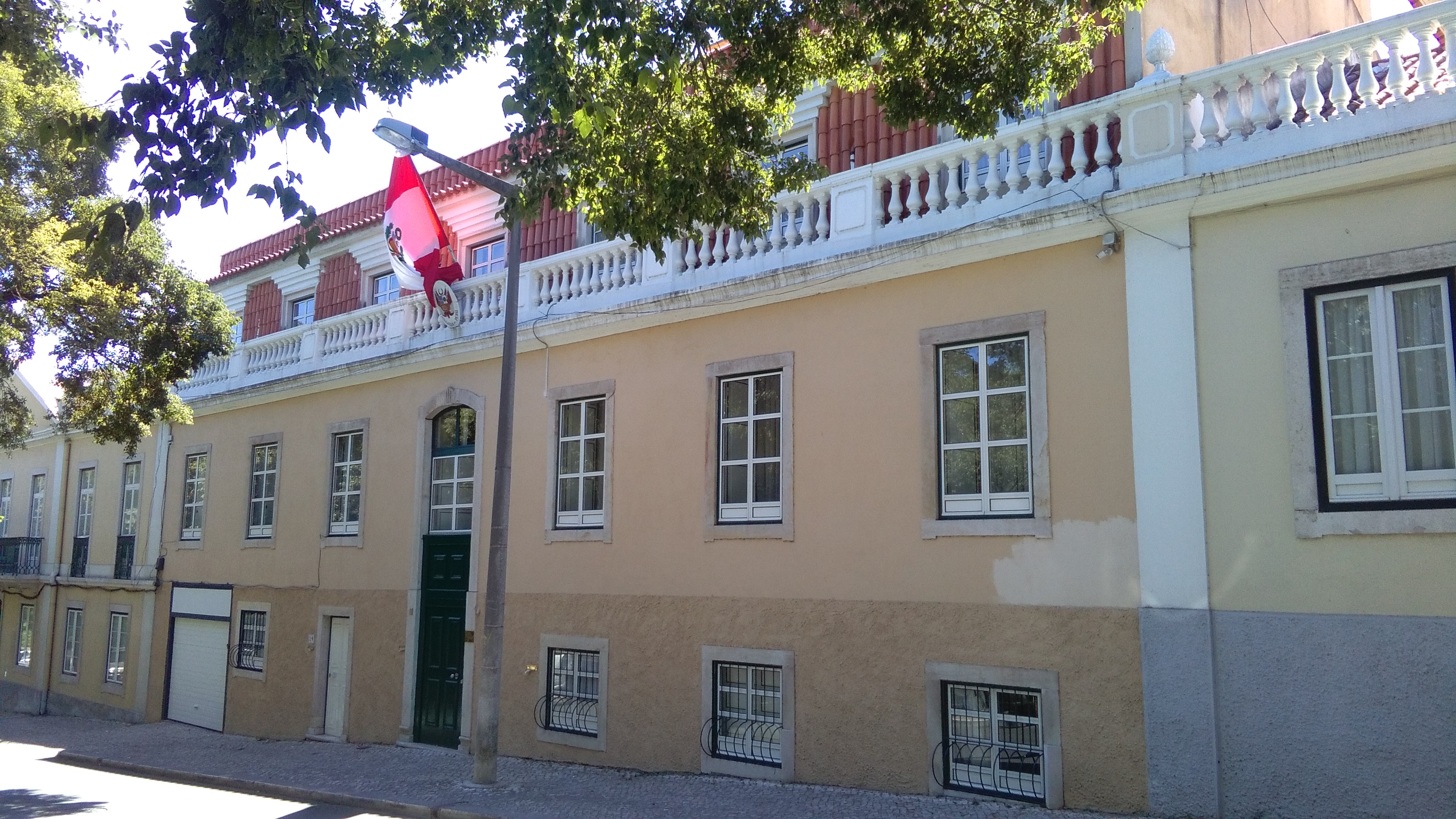
Residence of the Embassy in Lisbon

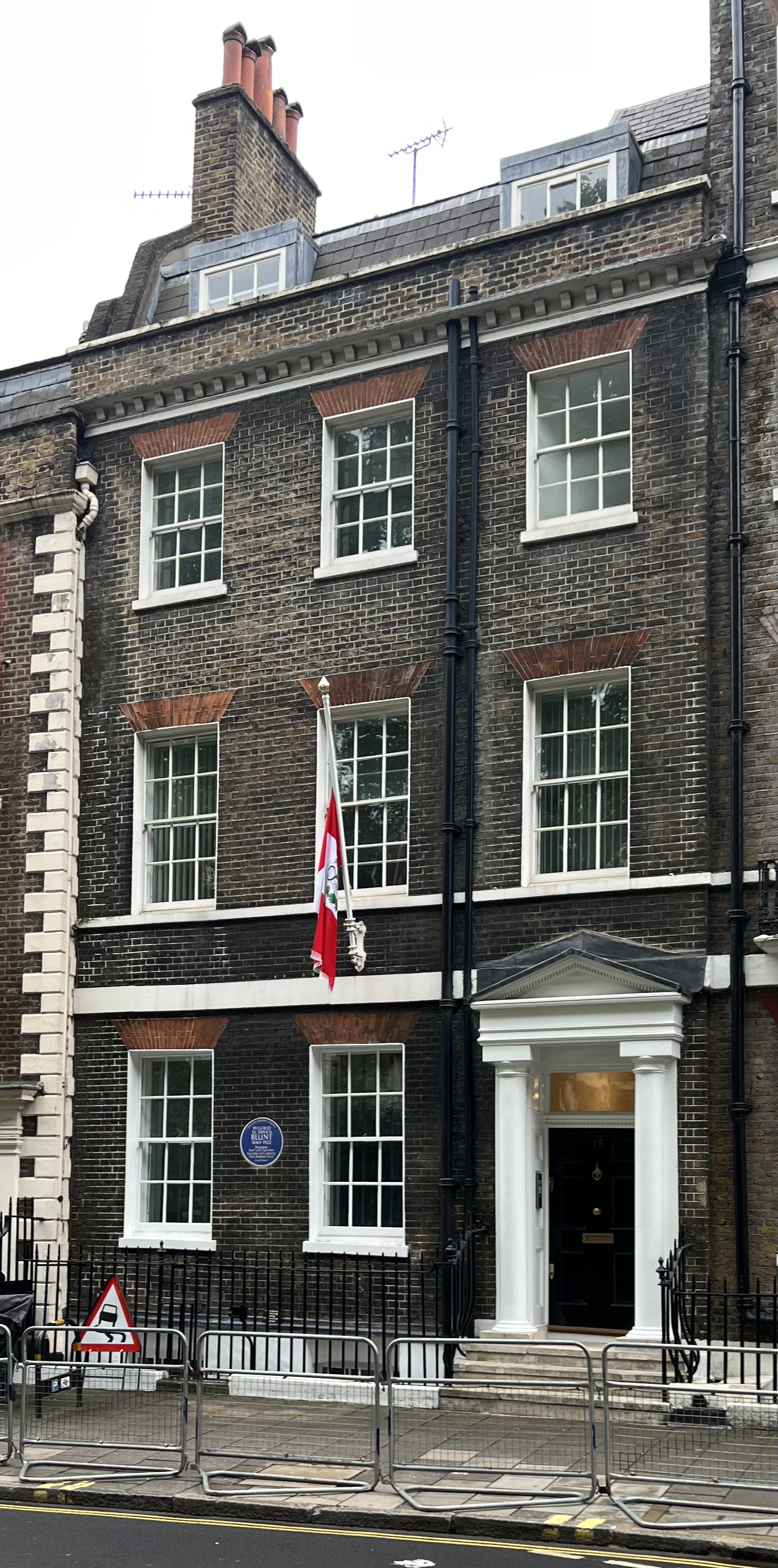
Embassy in London

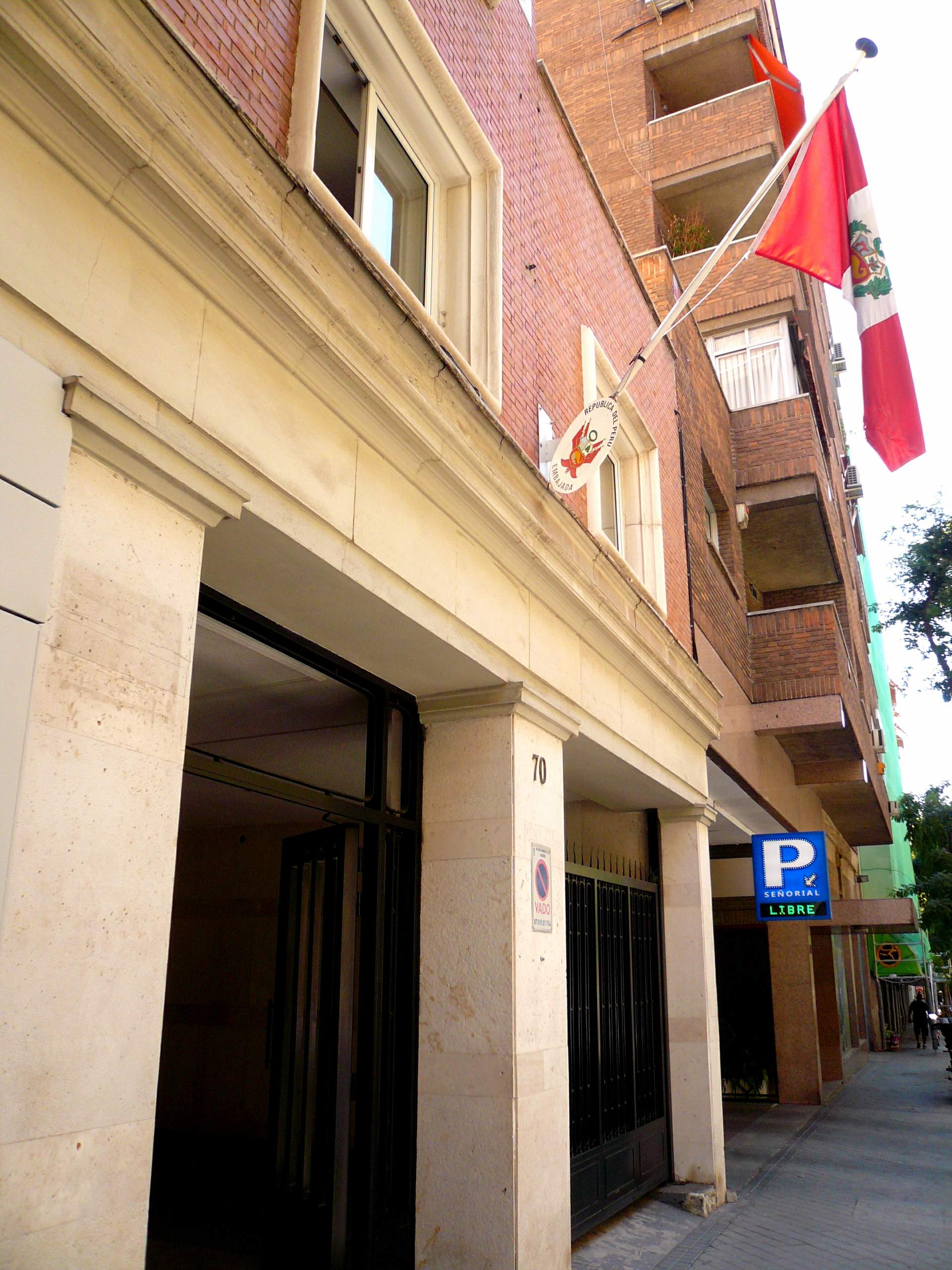
Embassy in Madrid

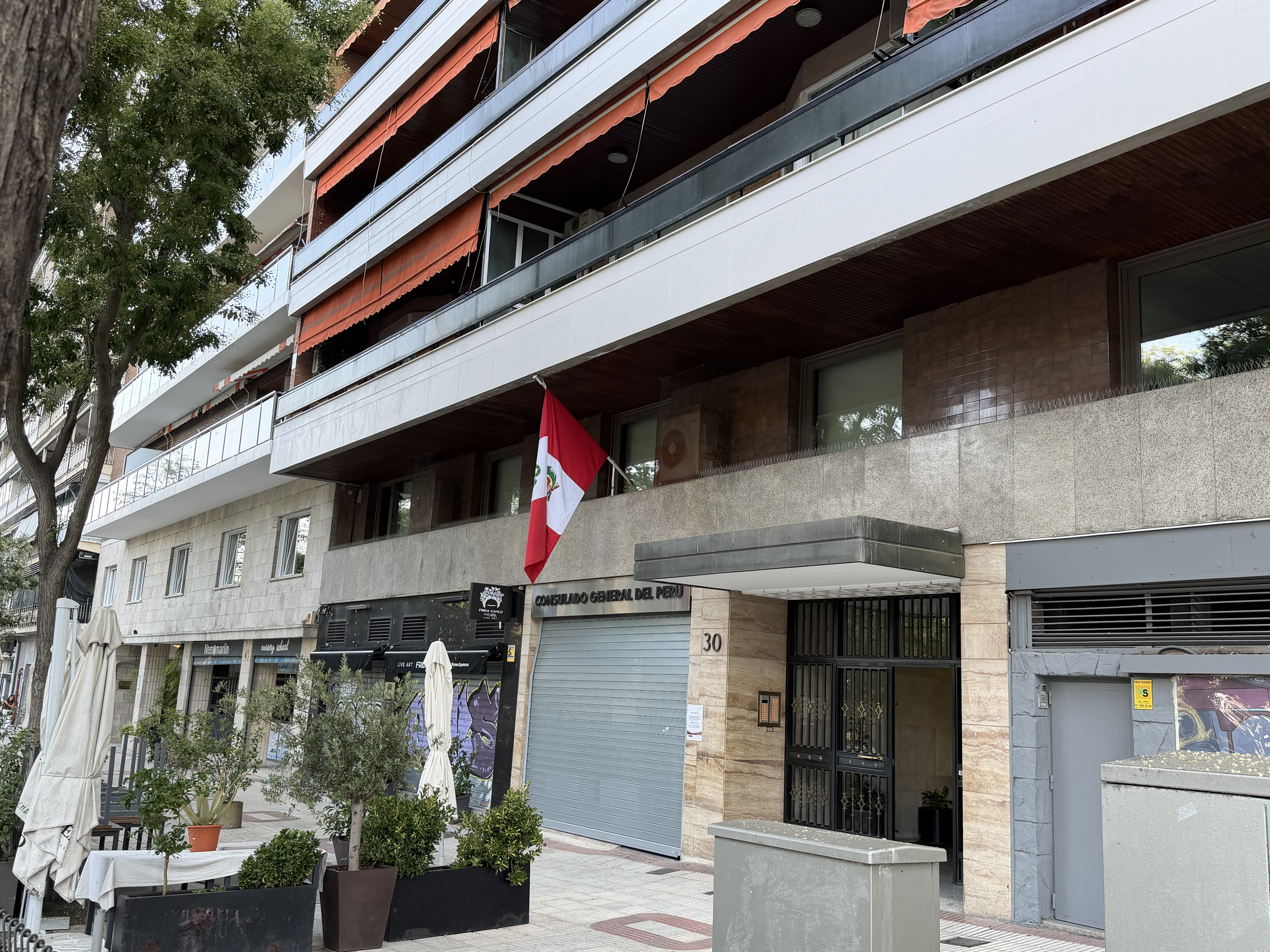
Consulate-General in Madrid

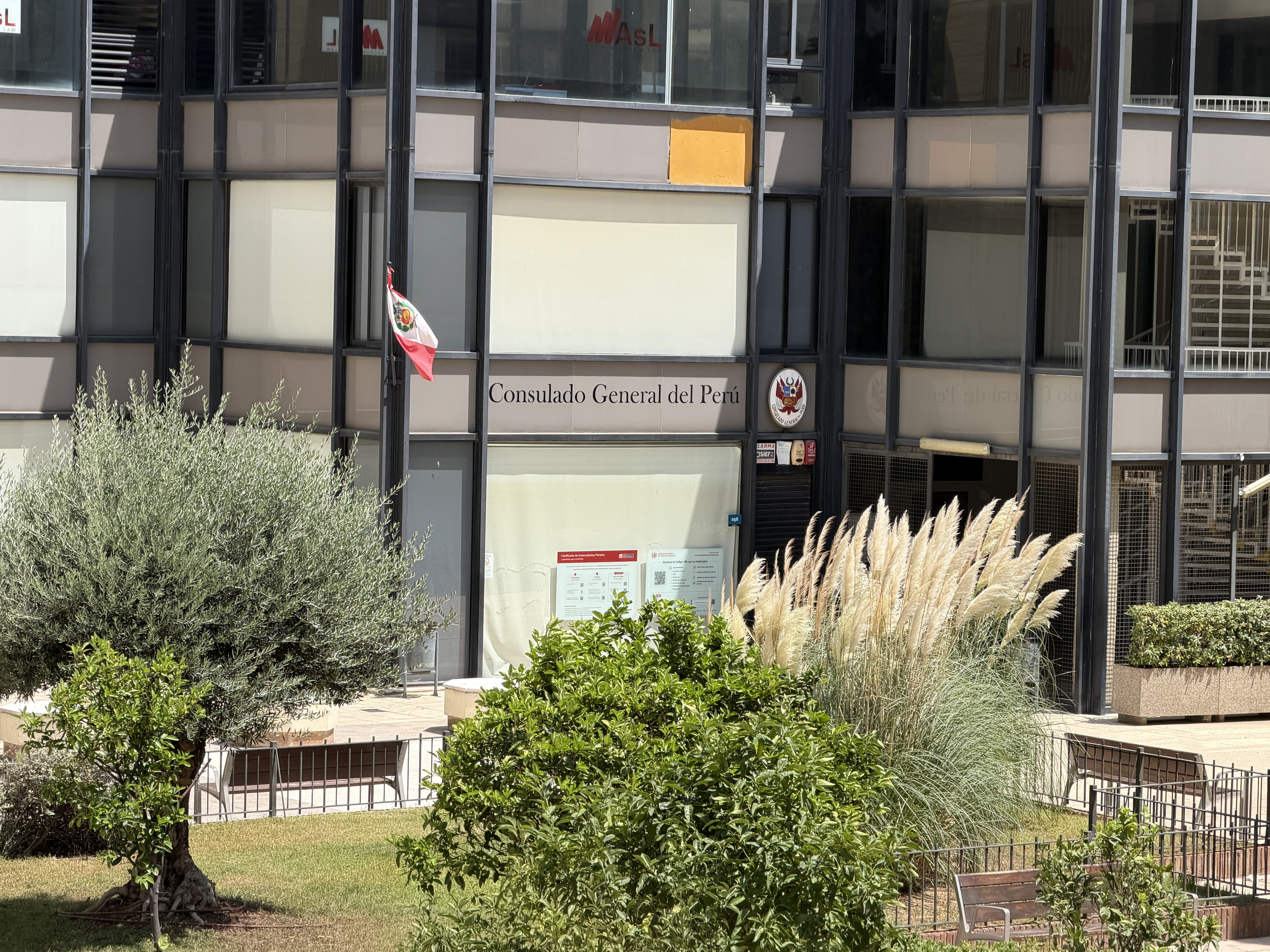
Consulate-General in Barcelona

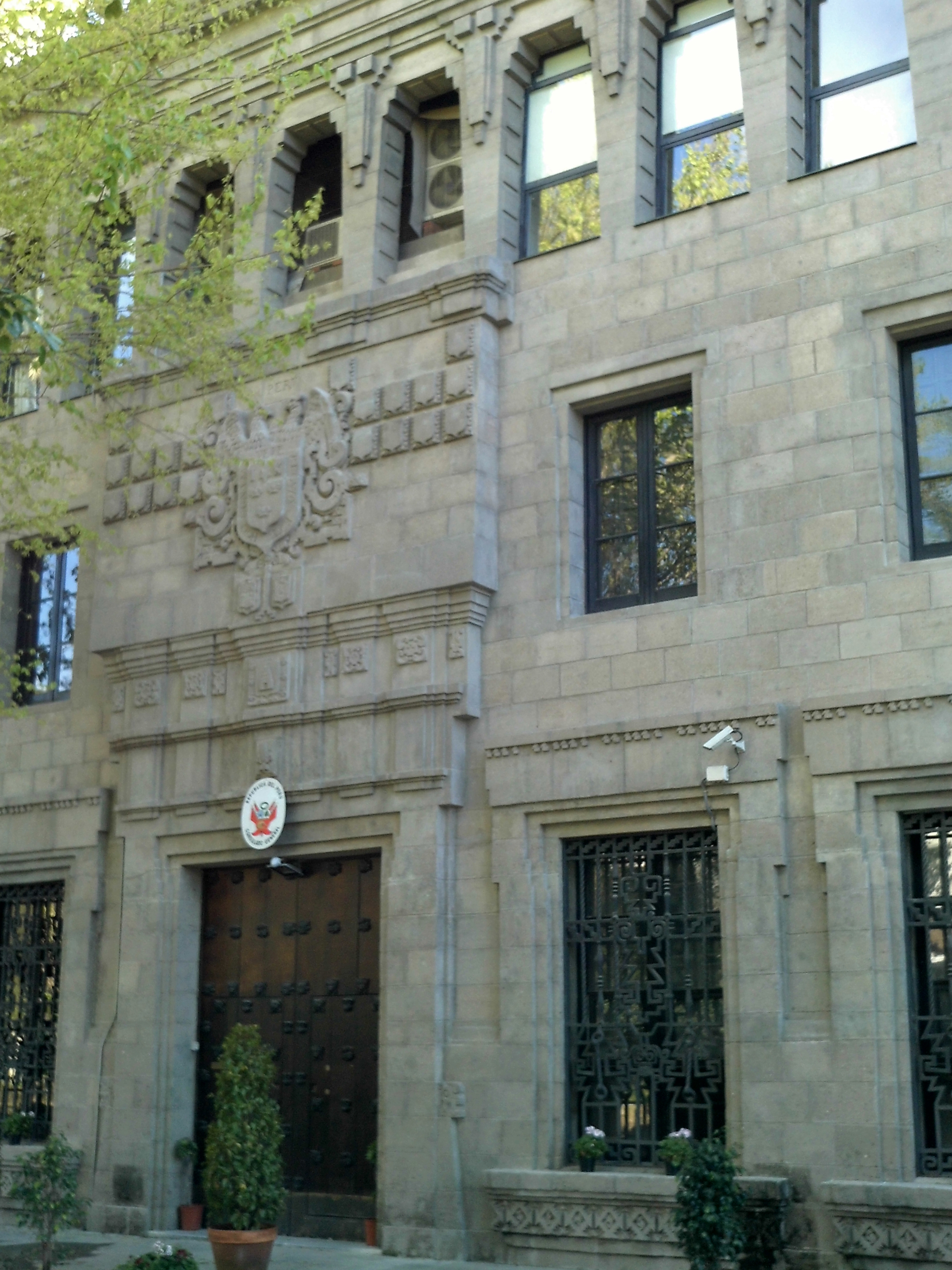
Consulate-General in Seville

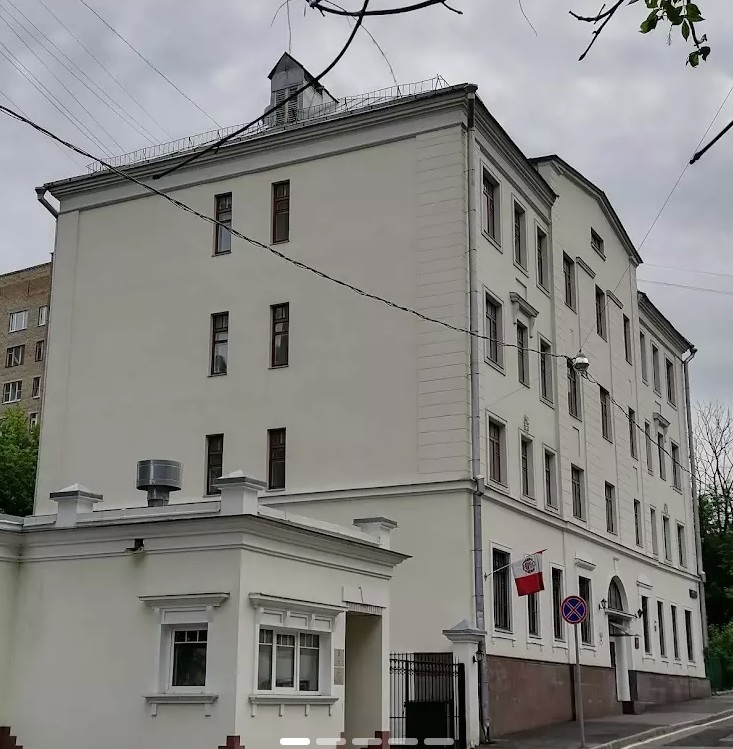
Embassy in Moscow

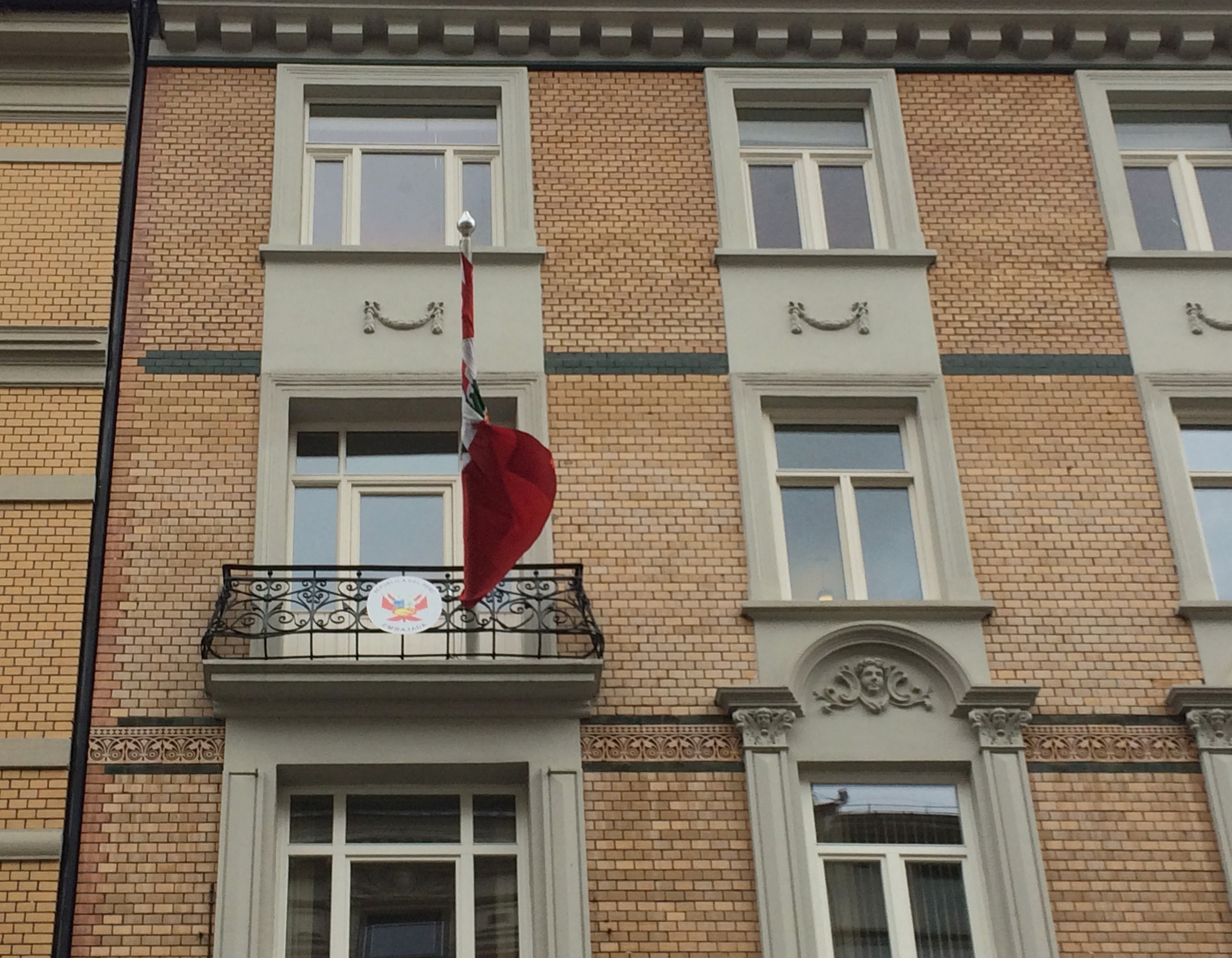
Embassy in Oslo

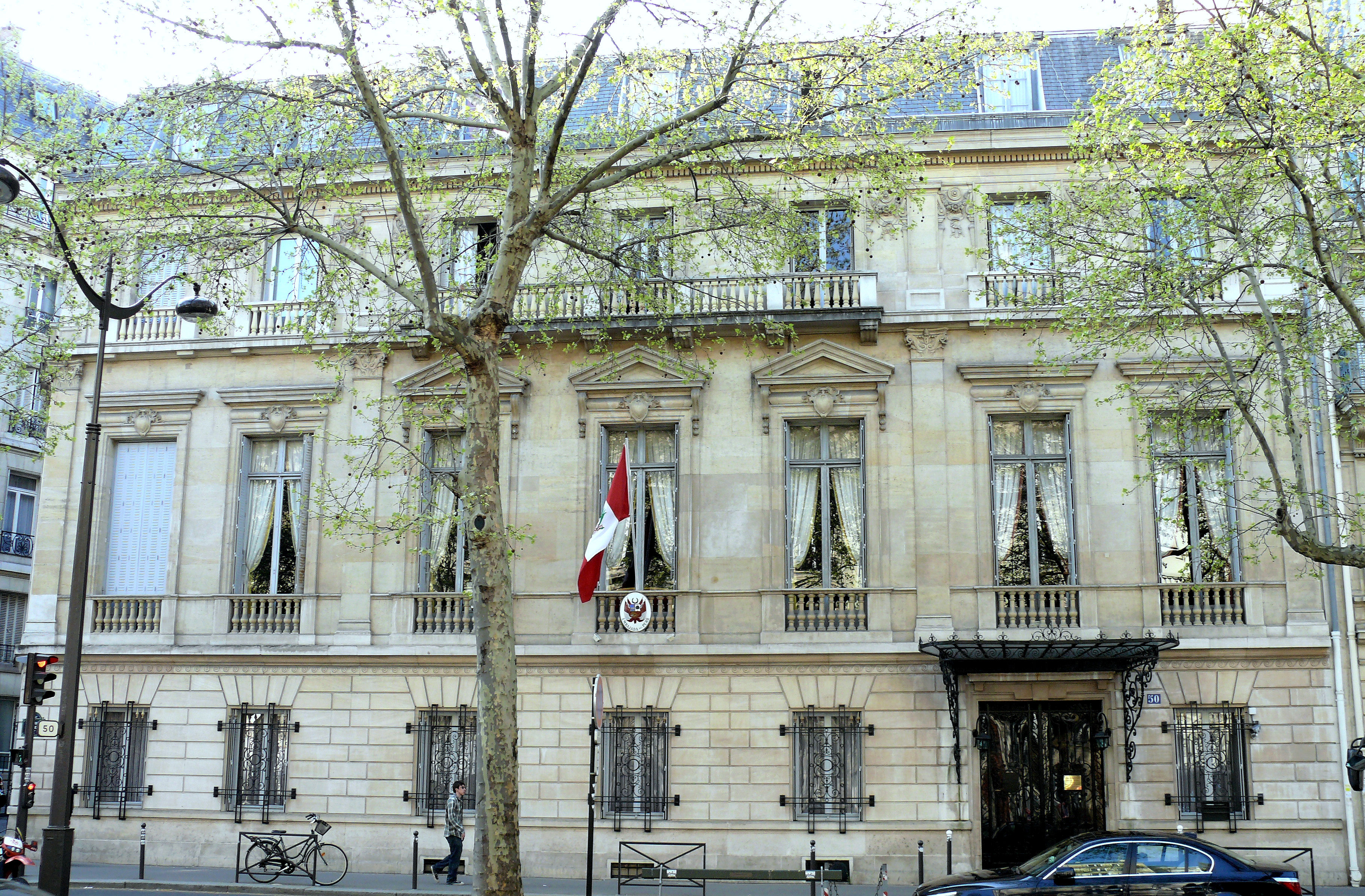
Embassy in Paris

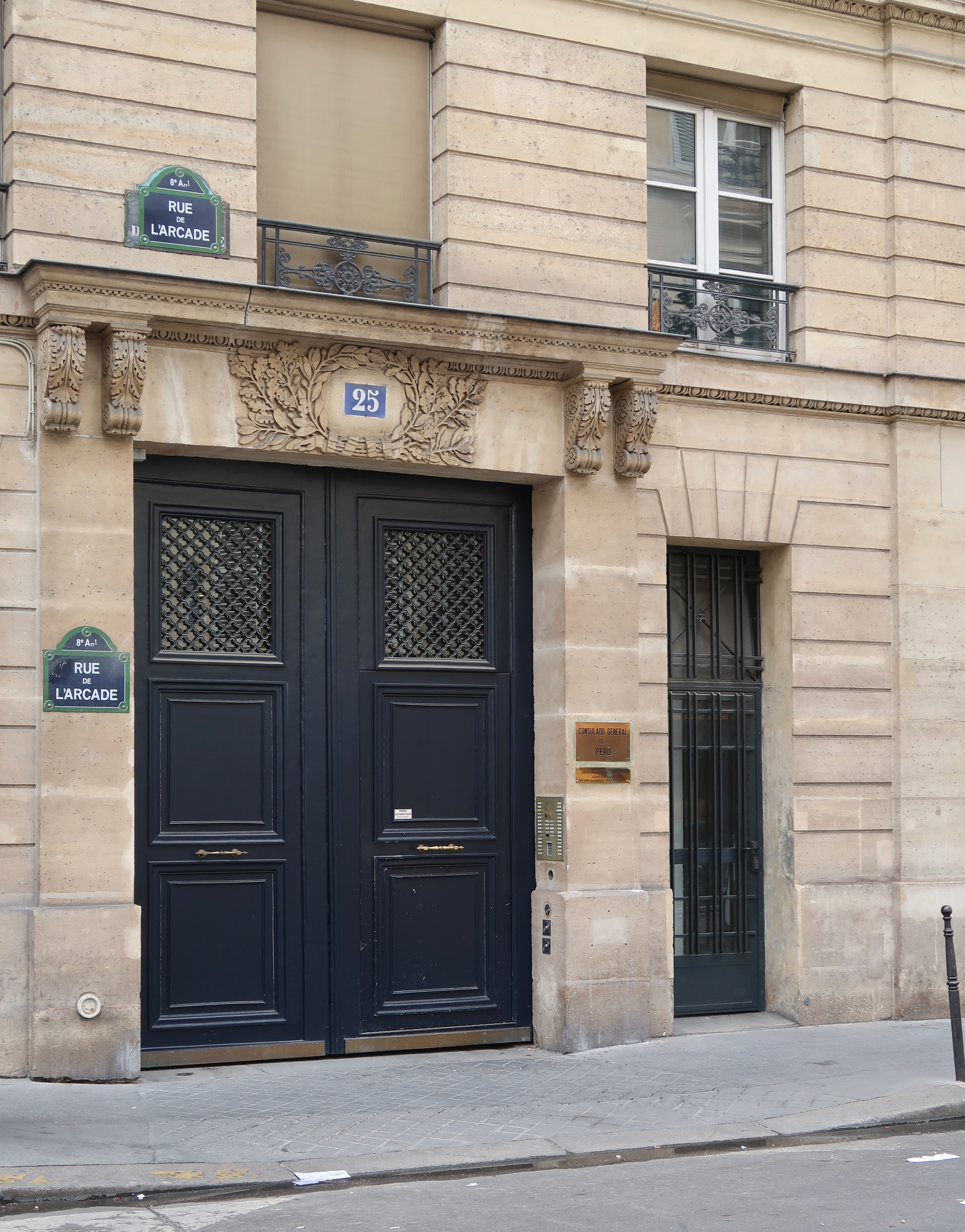
Consulate-General in Paris

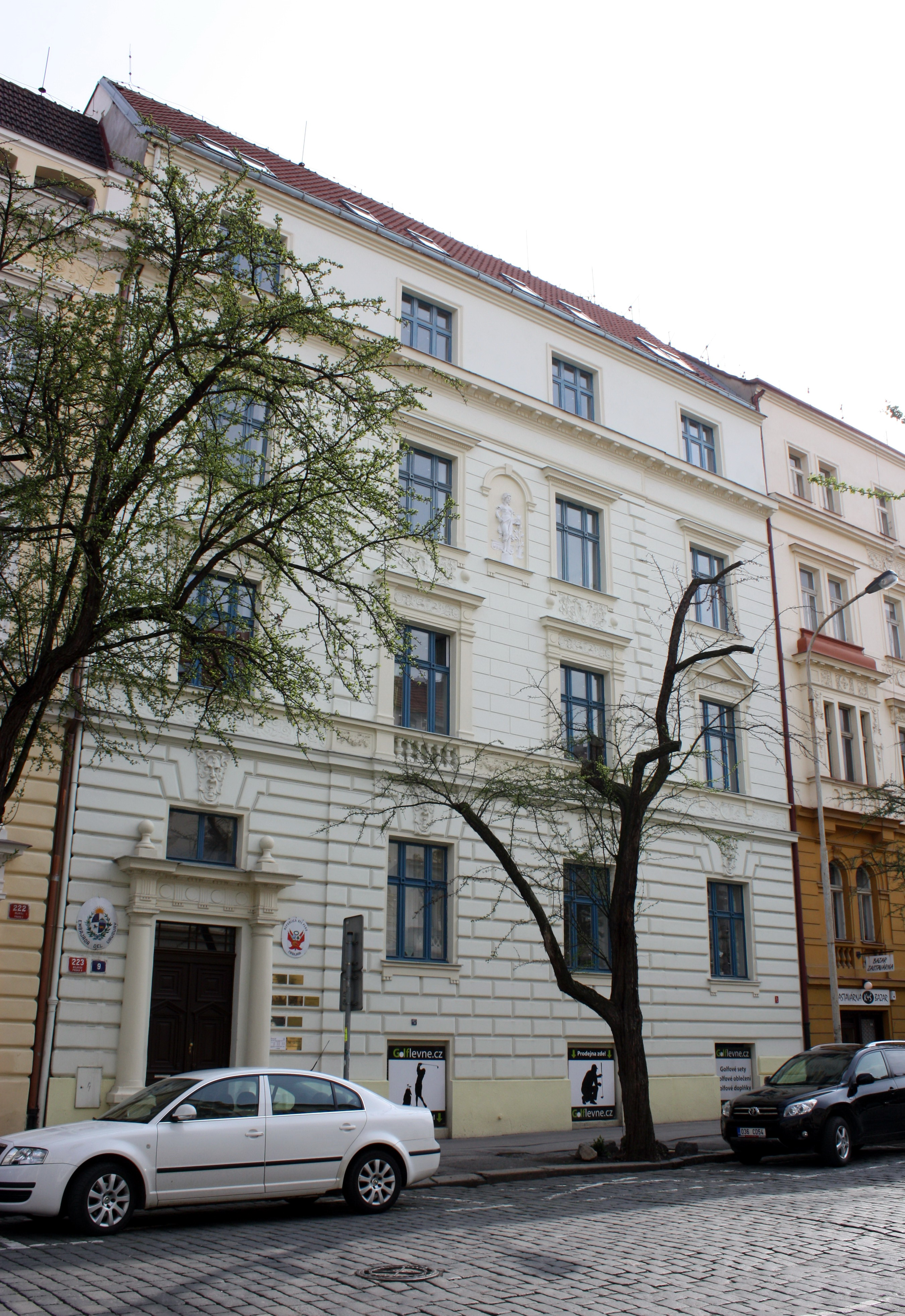
Embassy in Prague

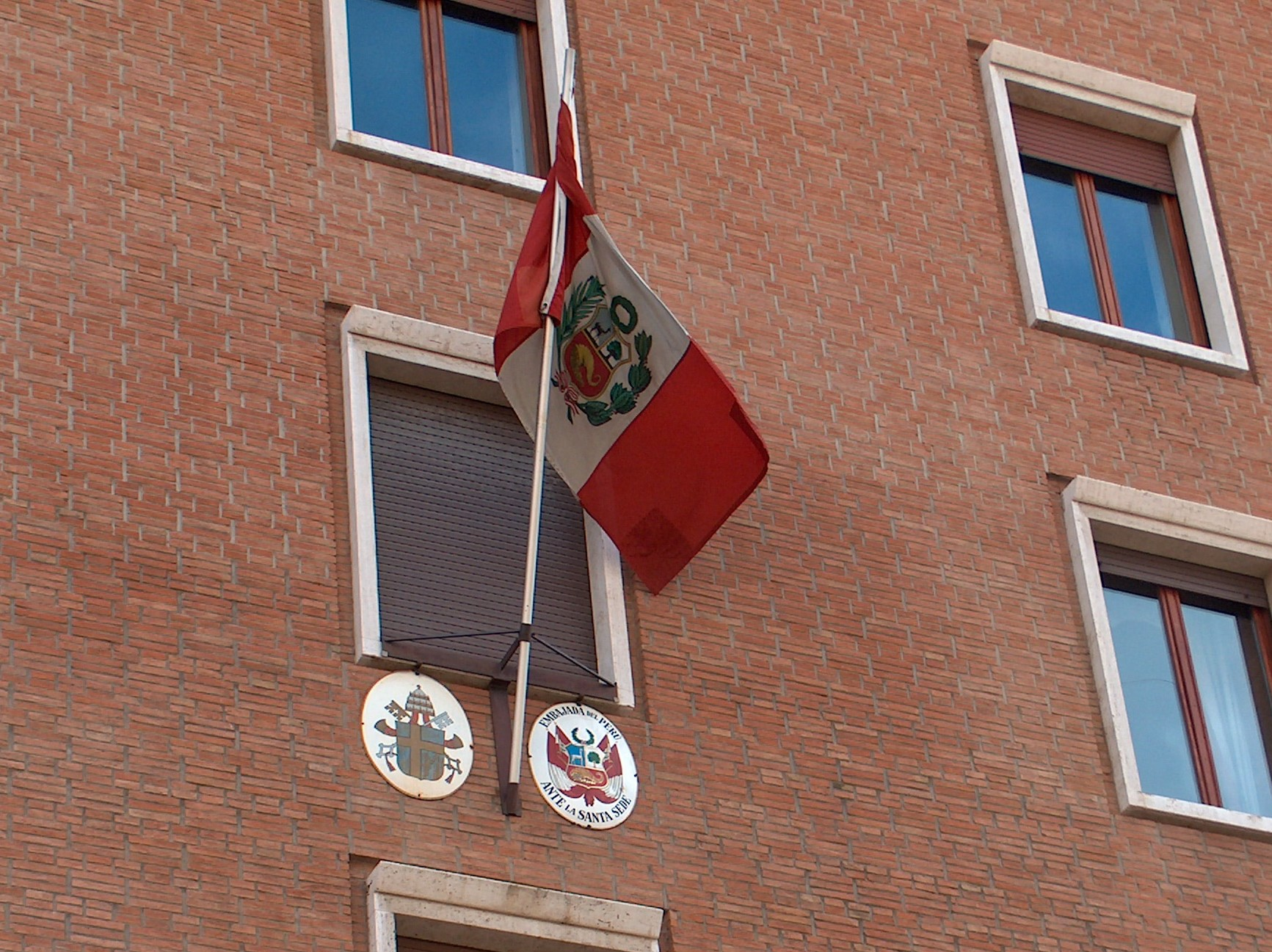
Embassy to the Holy See in Rome

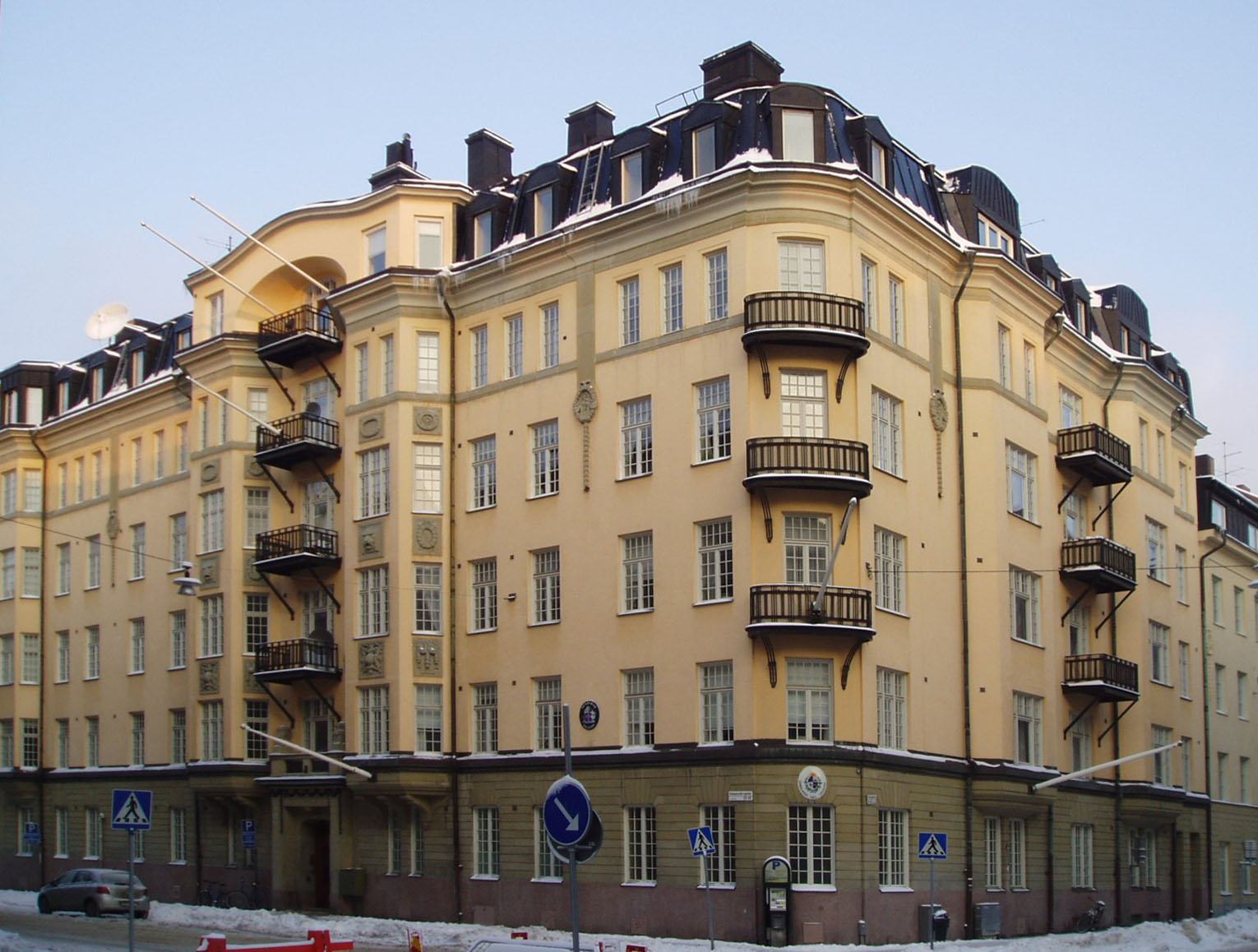
Embassy in Stockholm

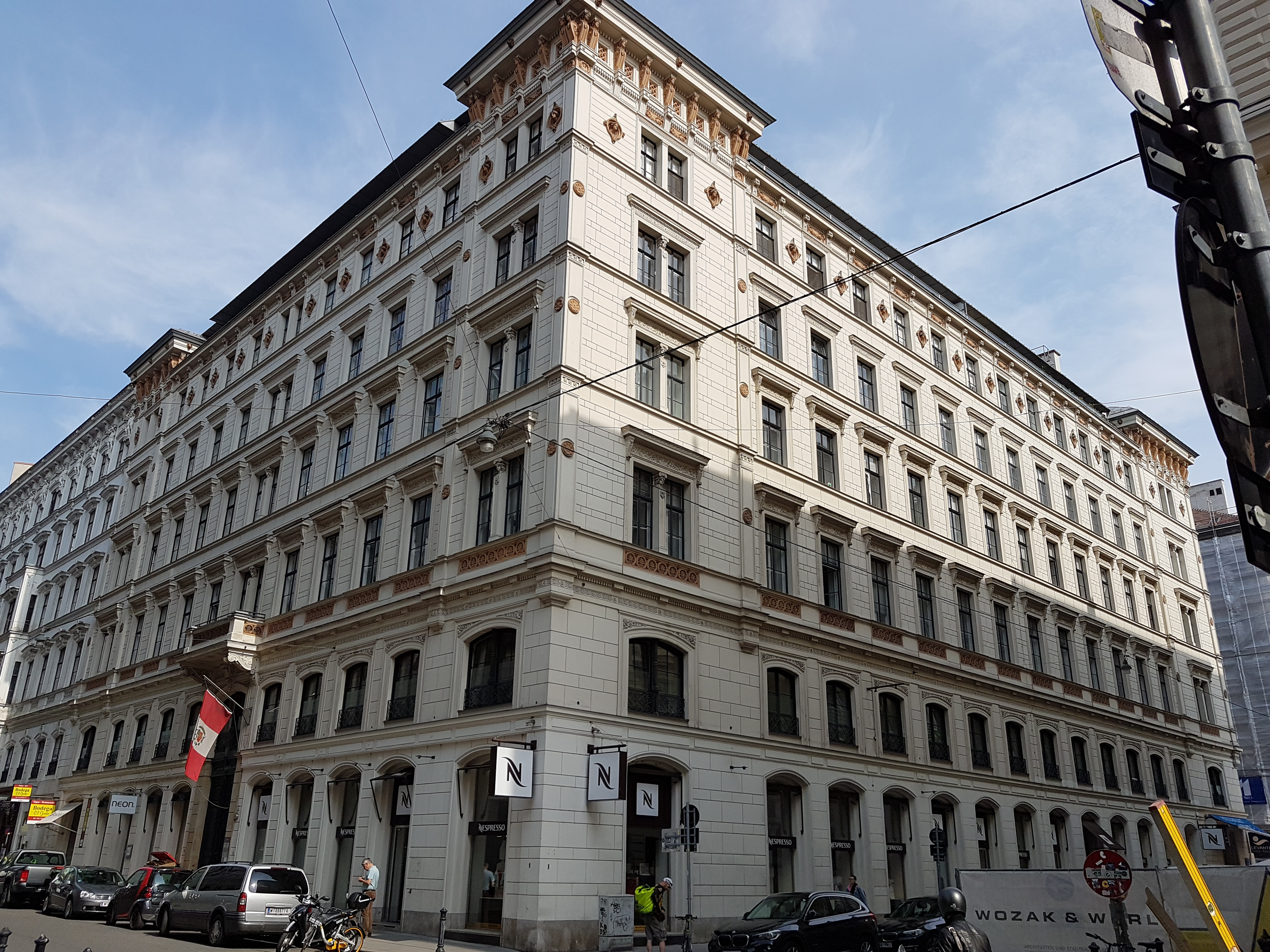
Embassy in Vienna

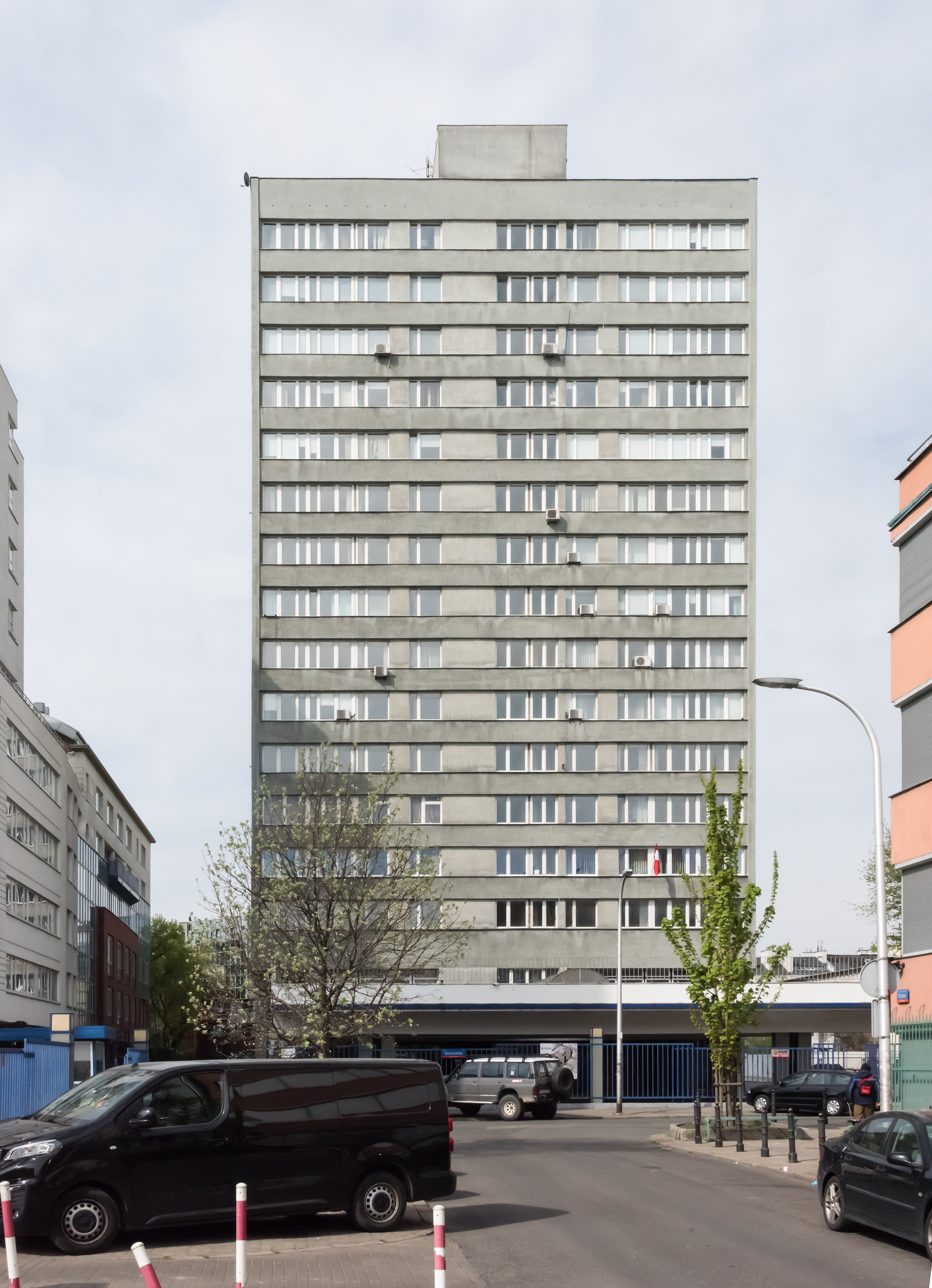
Building hosting the embassy in Warsaw

=== Oceania ===
Host country	Host city	Mission	Concurrent accreditation	Ref.
Australia	Canberra	Embassy	Countries: Fiji; Papua New Guinea; Solomon Islands; Vanuatu	
Australia	Sydney	Consulate-General	Countries: Fiji; Papua New Guinea; Solomon Islands; Vanuatu	
New Zealand	Wellington	Embassy		

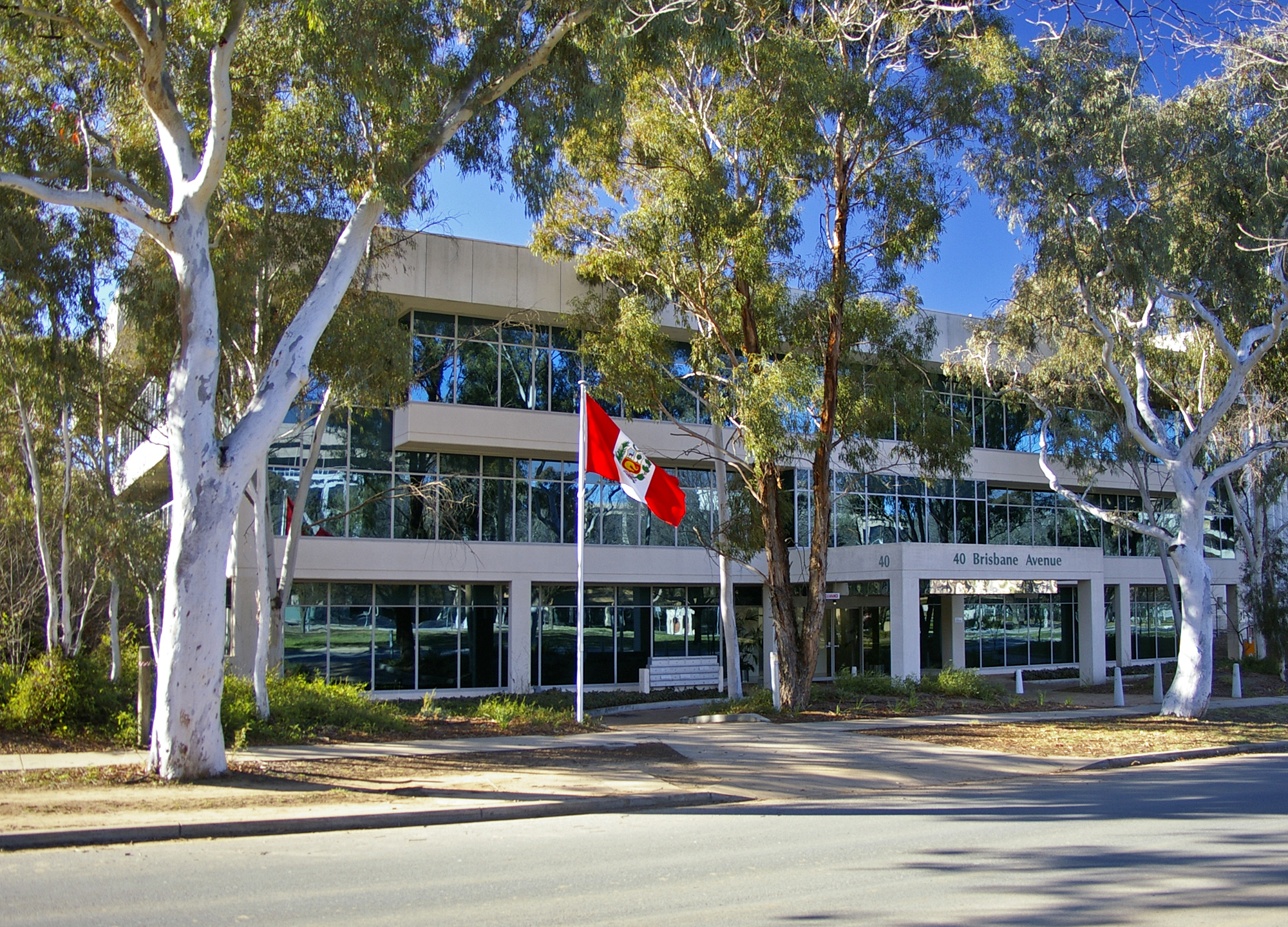
Embassy in Canberra

=== Multilateral organizations ===
Organization	Host city	Host country	Mission	Concurrent accreditation	Ref.
Organization of American States	Washington, D.C.	United States	Permanent Mission		
United Nations	New York City	United States	Permanent Mission		
United Nations	Geneva	Switzerland	Permanent Mission	Multilateral Organizations: United Nations Human Settlements Programme; World Trade Organization	
UNESCO	Paris	France	Permanent Mission		

== Closed missions ==
=== Africa ===
Host country	Host city	Mission	Year closed	Ref.
South Africa	Cape Town	Consulate	1985	
Zambia	Lusaka	Embassy	1990	
Zimbabwe	Harare	Embassy	1990	

=== Americas ===
Host country	Host city	Mission	Year closed	Ref.
Bolivia	El Alto	Consulate	2023	
Chile	Valparaíso	Consulate-General (Note: To be reopened.)	2020	
Ecuador	Macará	Consulate	2017	
Haiti	Port-au-Prince	Embassy	1991	
Jamaica	Kingston	Embassy	2007	
Mexico	Mexico City	Embassy	2025	
Venezuela	Caracas	Embassy	2024	
Venezuela	Puerto Ordaz	Consulate-General	2024	

=== Asia ===
Host country	Host city	Mission	Year closed	Ref.
Azerbaijan	Baku	Embassy	2020	
Iran	Tehran	Embassy	1978	
Republic of China (Taiwan)	Beijing	Embassy	1946	
Republic of China (Taiwan)	Taipei	Embassy (Note: Continues as a commercial office nowadays.)	1971	

=== Europe ===
Host country	Host city	Mission	Year closed	Ref.
Bulgaria	Sofia	Embassy	2003	
Serbia and Montenegro	Belgrade	Embassy	2006	
Switzerland	Zurich	Consulate-General	2023	
Ukraine	Kyiv	Embassy	2006	

== Missions to open ==
Host country	Host city	Mission	Ref.
Chile	Valparaíso	Consulate-General	
Jamaica	Kingston	Embassy	

== See also ==
- Ambassadors of Peru
- Foreign relations of Peru
- List of diplomatic missions in Peru
- Visa policy of Peru
