= Carlos Pareja =

Peruvian diplomat

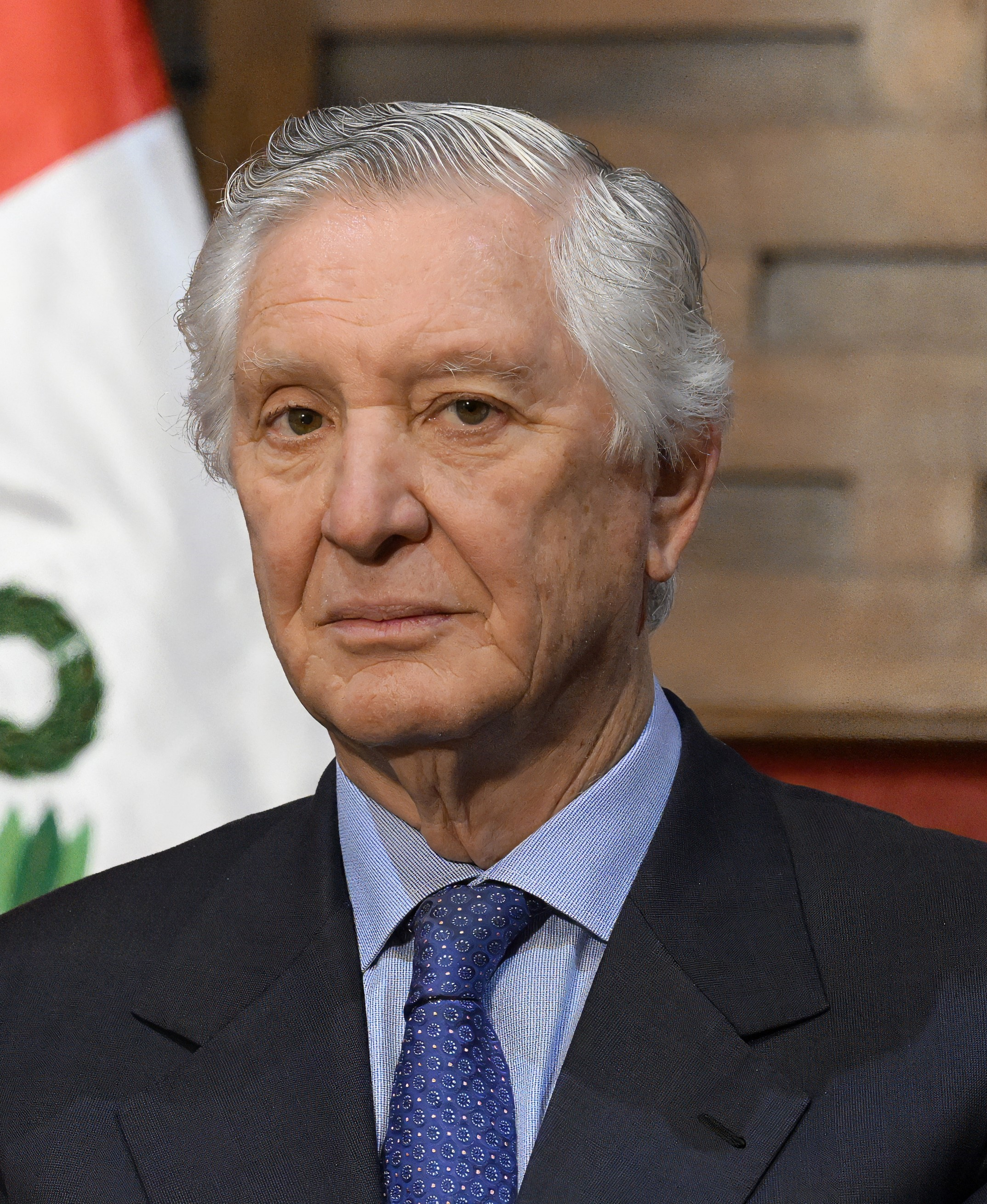
- Pareja Ríos in 2026

Minister of Foreign Relations
- In office 23 April 2026 – 28 July 2026
- President: José María Balcázar
- Prime Minister: Luis Arroyo Sánchez
- Preceded by: Hugo de Zela
- Succeeded by: Carlos Espá

Ambassadors of Peru
- Current Mission
- to the United Nations: 2026-present
- President: Keiko Fujimori
- to the United States: 2016-2018
- President: Pedro Pablo Kuczyński; Martín Vizcarra
- to Chile: 2009-2014
- President: Alan García; Ollanta Humala
- to Switzerland: 2003-2005
- President: Alejandro Toledo
- to Spain: 2000-2002
- President: Alberto Fujimori; Valentín Paniagua; Alejandro Toledo

Personal details
- Born: Carlos José Pareja Ríos; 7 July 1950 (age 76) Lima, Peru
- Children: 2
- Education: Pontifical Catholic University of Peru; University of San Martín de Porres

Carlos José Pareja Ríos (Note: In this name that follows Hispanic American naming customs, the first or paternal surname is Pareja and the second or maternal family name is Ríos.) (born 7 July 1950) is a Peruvian former diplomat. During his diplomatic career, he served as ambassador to Spain, Switzerland, Chile and the United States; he was later his country's Minister of Foreign Affairs for three months in 2026.

== Education ==
Pareja earned a B.A. degree from the Pontifical Catholic University of Peru and a bachelor of law from the University of San Martín de Porres.

== Diplomatic career ==
Pareja started his diplomatic career as Political Counselor at the Embassy in Washington from 1984 to 1990. The next three years he was the director of South American affairs in the Ministry of Foreign Affairs. From 1993 to 1997, he was a minister-counselor at the embassy in Santiago, Chile.

After his service as minister-counselor at the Embassy in Santiago, Pareja returned to Peru and served as Chief of Cabinet for the Vice Minister of Foreign Affairs. The following year, he was appointed as National Director of the Directorate-General of Sovereignty and Border Development. In 2000, Pareja joined his first ambassadorial position in Madrid and in 2003 he was transferred to Switzerland, where he served in a similar position. In 2006, he returned to Lima and acted as chief of protocol. From 2009 to 2014, Pareja served as ambassador to Chile. In 2014, he returned to the foreign ministry as director-general for the Americas. In 2015, he was transferred and continued to serve as director-general in the Directorate-General for Africa, the Middle East and the Gulf Region.

=== Ambassador to the United States ===
In 2016, Pareja was appointed ambassador of Peru to the United States of America.

On the morning of 20 April 2022, Ambassador Pareja called the Secret Service to report a man attempting to break into his official residence in the Forest Hills neighborhood of Washington, D.C. The Uniformed Division shot and killed the man.

His tenure as ambassador to the U.S. concluded in 2019 and, that same year, he retired from the diplomatic service.

== Minister of Foreign Affairs ==
Carlos Pareja Ríos was appointed Minister of Foreign Affairs by President José María Balcázar on 23 April 2026, replacing Hugo de Zela. He served until the change of administration on 28 July 2026.

== Personal life ==
Pareja is married with two children.
