= Manuel de Freyre y Santander =

Peruvian diplomat (1872–1944)

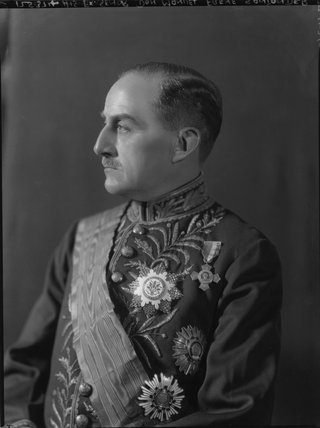

Peruvian Ambassador to the United States
- In office 1930–1941
- President: Luis Miguel Sánchez Cerro; Oscar R. Benavides; Manuel Prado Ugarteche
- Preceded by: Hernán Velarde
- Succeeded by: Pedro Beltrán Espantoso

Ambassador of Peru to China and Japan
- In office 1919–1919
- Succeeded by: Manuel Bonnemaison

Ambassador of Peru to the United Kingdom
- In office 1926–1930
- Preceded by: Agustín G. Ganoza
- Succeeded by: Alfredo González Prada

Personal details
- Born: 29 November 1872 Wilkins House, Washington, D.C., United States
- Died: 1 April 1944 (aged 71) Washington, D.C., United States
- Resting place: Arlington National Cemetery
- Spouse: Elizabeth Na'Honer
- Education: University of San Marcos
- Occupation: Diplomat
- Profession: Civil engineer
- Awards: Grand Cordon of the Order of the Sun

Manuel de Freyre y Santander (29 November 1872 – 1 April 1944) was a Peruvian diplomat. He was Ambassador of Peru to the United States from 1930 to 1944 and Minister Plenipotentiary to the United Kingdom, Argentina, Colombia, China and Japan.

== Biography ==
He was born in 1872 at the Peruvian legation in Washington, D.C., the son of Colonel Manuel de Freyre y Santa Cruz and his third wife Clementina Santander y Pontón (daughter of Francisco de Paula Santander, 1st President of New Granada). At the time of his birth, his father was the Minister Plenipotentiary of Peru to the United States, a post he retained until his death in 1877.

He received his early education in the United States and England, then he studied civil engineering at the Universities of San Marcos, Pisa and Lausanne. He entered the diplomatic service in 1901 as an attaché of the Peruvian Commission before the Arbitration Court at Bern. The following year, de Freyre was moved to Bogotá, where he successively served as attaché, Second Secretary and Chargé d'affaires. In 1907 he was appointed First Secretary of the legation in Washington, D.C., then Chargé d'affaires in 1916 and finally promoted to Minister Plenipotentiary in 1917.

In 1919 he was appointed Minister to China and Japan and likewise Minister to Colombia in 1922. In 1924, when de Freyre was serving as Minister in Buenos Aires, he was appointed as Peruvian delegate to the Plebiscitary Commission of Tacna and Arica, by which American Government issued an award arranging the boundary dispute between Peru and Chile produced as a consequence of the War of the Pacific.

De Freyre returned as Minister to Argentina, where he remained until 1926 when he was appointed Minister Plenipotentiary to the United Kingdom. In 1930 he was appointed Ambassador to the United States, a post he served during four administrations. In 1939 he became Dean of the Diplomatic Corps in Washington, D.C.

As his father before him, de Freyre died in office on 1 April 1944 in Washington, D.C. He was buried at Arlington National Cemetery.
