= Embassy of the United States, Lima =

U.S. diplomatic mission to Peru

Coordinates: 12.1012°S 76.9691°W

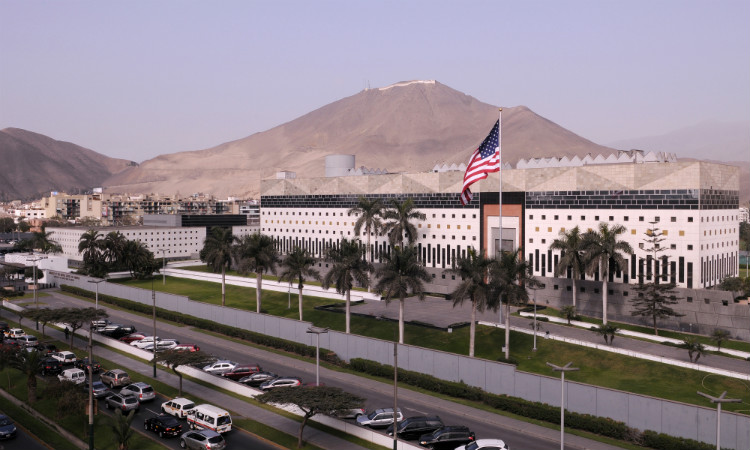
- The embassy in 2022
- Location: El Polo, Santiago de Surco, Peru
- Opening: July 4, 1995
- Website: pe.usembassy.gov

The Embassy of the United States in Lima represents the permanent diplomatic mission of the United States of America in Peru. It is located at El Polo, a neighbourhood of the upper-scale district of Santiago de Surco, since 1995.

The embassy operates a Consular Agency in Cuzco, located two blocks from the main square, behind the Coricancha Temple.

Stephanie Syptak-Ramnath was appointed U.S. ambassador to Peru on June 20, 2024.

== History ==
=== Original buildings ===
Peru and the United States established relations on May 2, 1826, following Peru's independence from Spain, and relations were elevated to embassy level on 1920. The embassy of the United States was housed in different buildings before the opening of its current location. Prior to relations being elevated to embassy, the legation was located at the Quinta Heeren.

In 1925, the U.S. government purchased a property in the Santa Beatriz area of Lima district to house its embassy. The three-floor building was designed by U.S. architect Frederick Larkin, in association with Leland W. King and Paul Jaquet, being built by the Peruvian construction company Florez y Costa, S.A.. Construction began in late 1942. 1,300 m^{2} (14,000 sq ft) of the 11,600 m^{2} (125,000 sq ft) property were dedicated to parks and gardens.

The building was designed in a Neocolonial style, featuring a replica travertine marble gate of the Palacio de Torre Tagle on its entrance, as well as on the second floor. The three floors of the building served as either storage (basement), a reception area (first floor) or bedrooms (second floor). The building, located next to a replica of The Three Graces at the fifth block of Arequipa Avenue, and across the street from Washington Square, currently serves as the residence of the U.S. ambassador.

Another building that housed the diplomatic mission of the U.S. was located in the intersection between Wilson Avenue and Spain Avenue, part of the historic center of Lima. The original terrain was bought in 1947. After General Juan Velasco Alvarado established a military junta following a successful military coup on 3 October 1968, the embassy was placed under surveillance by the National Intelligence Service, assisted by the Soviet KGB as well as Klaus Barbie, now a naturalised Bolivian intelligence officer.

The embassy was moved from its location near the Civic Center to the Monterrico suburbs due to the internal conflict in Peru, as buildings affiliated with the United States were targeted by the terrorist group Shining Path on several occasions, as well as by the MRTA. By that point, the embassy's building had been bought by Clínica Internacional, owned by Grupo Breca, who moved into the building after the former tenants' departure. The consulate, then located in Miraflores district, also was moved to the new chancery in Monterrico, as it was also targeted on at least one occasion. One such attack was carried out on July 31, 1985.

=== Current building ===
The current building was built in the Monterrico residential area of Santiago de Surco, in or around what was formerly part of the grounds belonging to the La Encalada hacienda. Construction took two years, and the building was inaugurated on July 4, 1995. The building was designed by Bernardo Fort-Brescia, whose façade features a blend of Incan and modern architecture, and also features small windows as a security feature. The building's design was met with mixed reactions from both Peruvian and U.S. citizens.

In 2002, two security guards of the embassy were among eight people killed when a car bomb exploded in the El Polo shopping mall, located across the street. The building received no apparent damage, unlike the hotel and bank located near the location of the blast.

The building's façade was lit up with the national colors of Ukraine in response to Russia's invasion of the country in February 2022.

On January 25, 2023, the building's main entrance was blocked by protesters as part of a series of protests by supporters of former president Pedro Castillo.

=== Residence ===
The building located in Santa Beatriz which was completed in 1945 serves as the embassy's official residence.

== Gallery ==
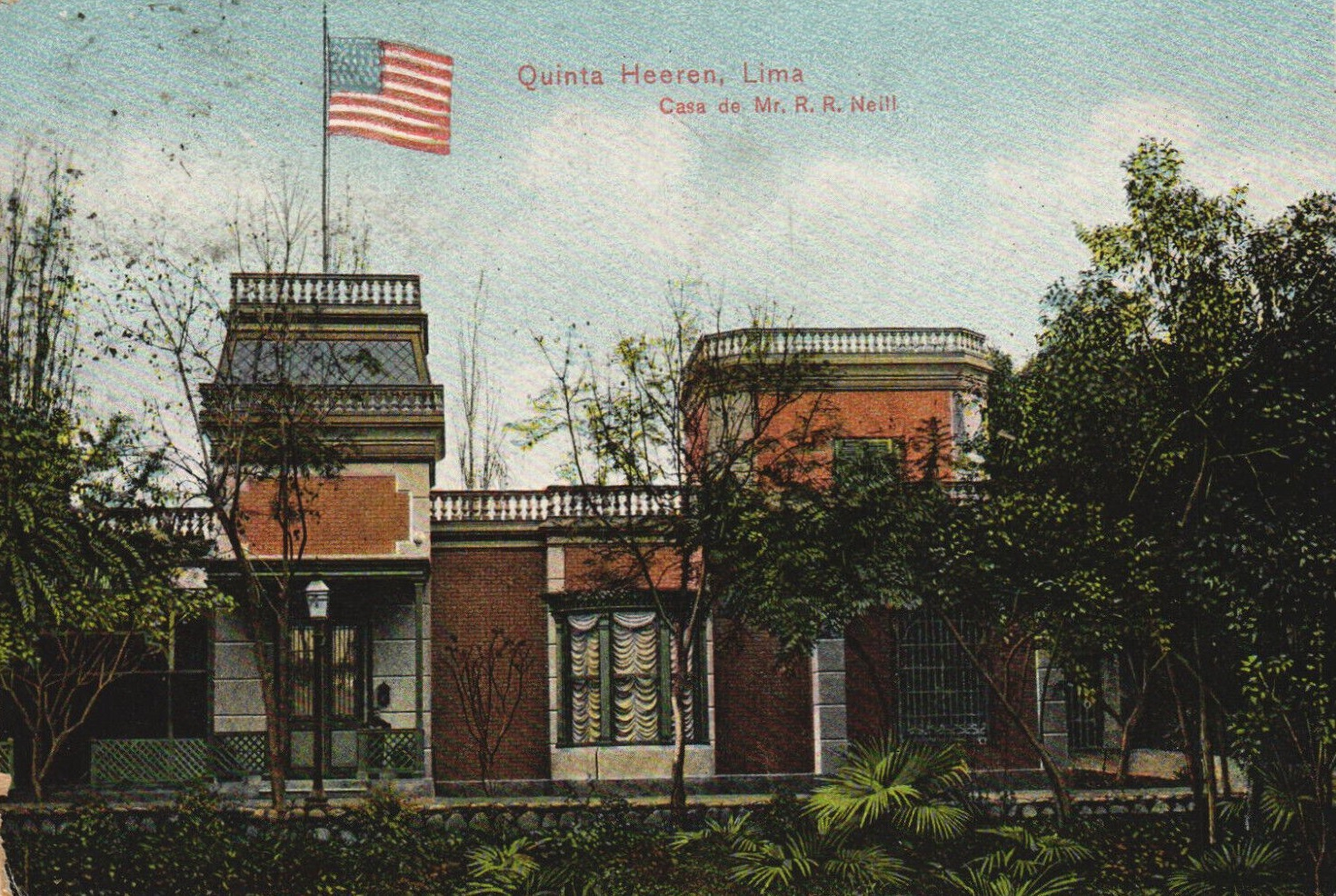
U.S. Legation at the Quinta Heeren

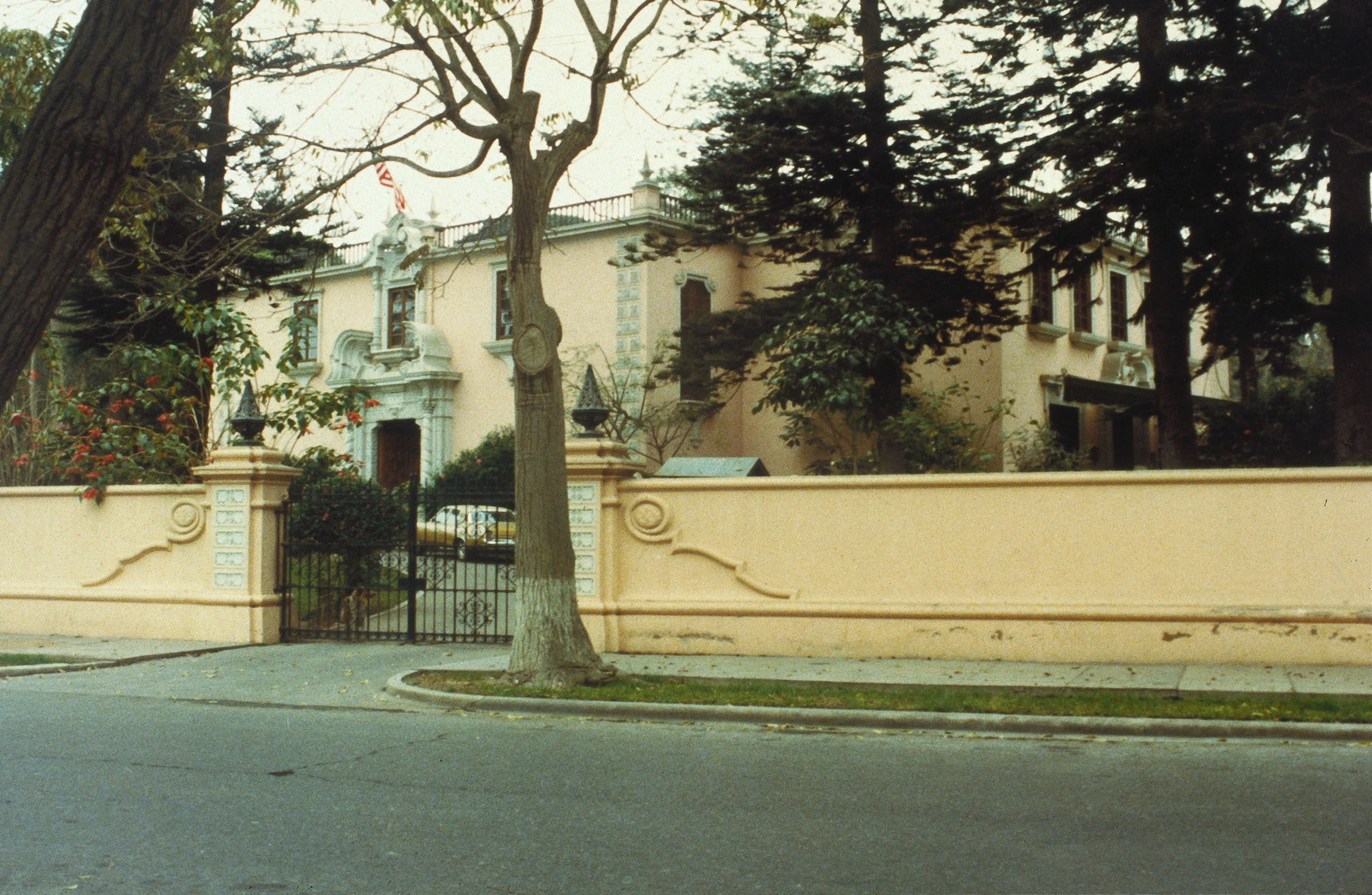
Residence in Santa Beatriz, 1979

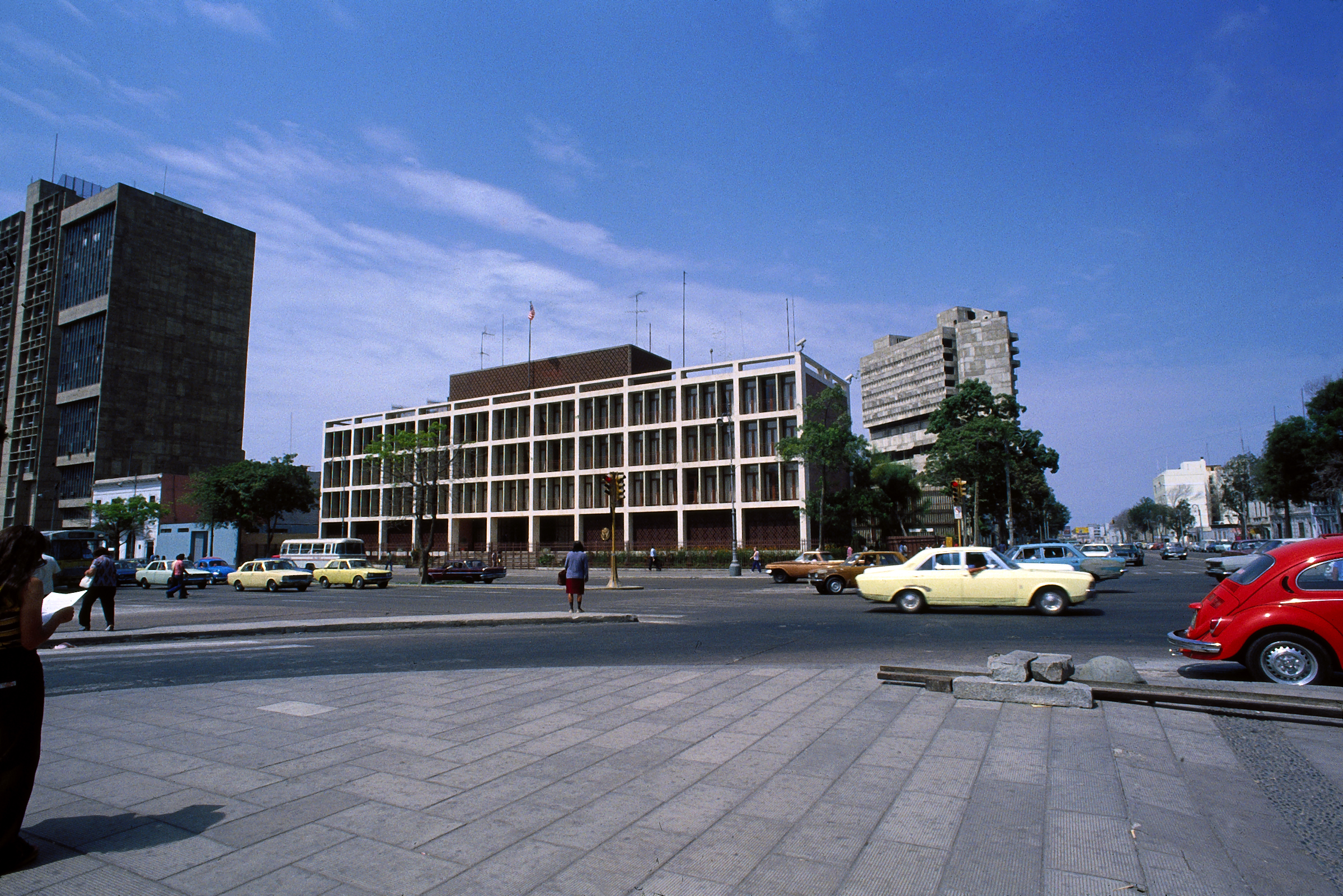
The former embassy in central Lima, today the Clínica Internacional.

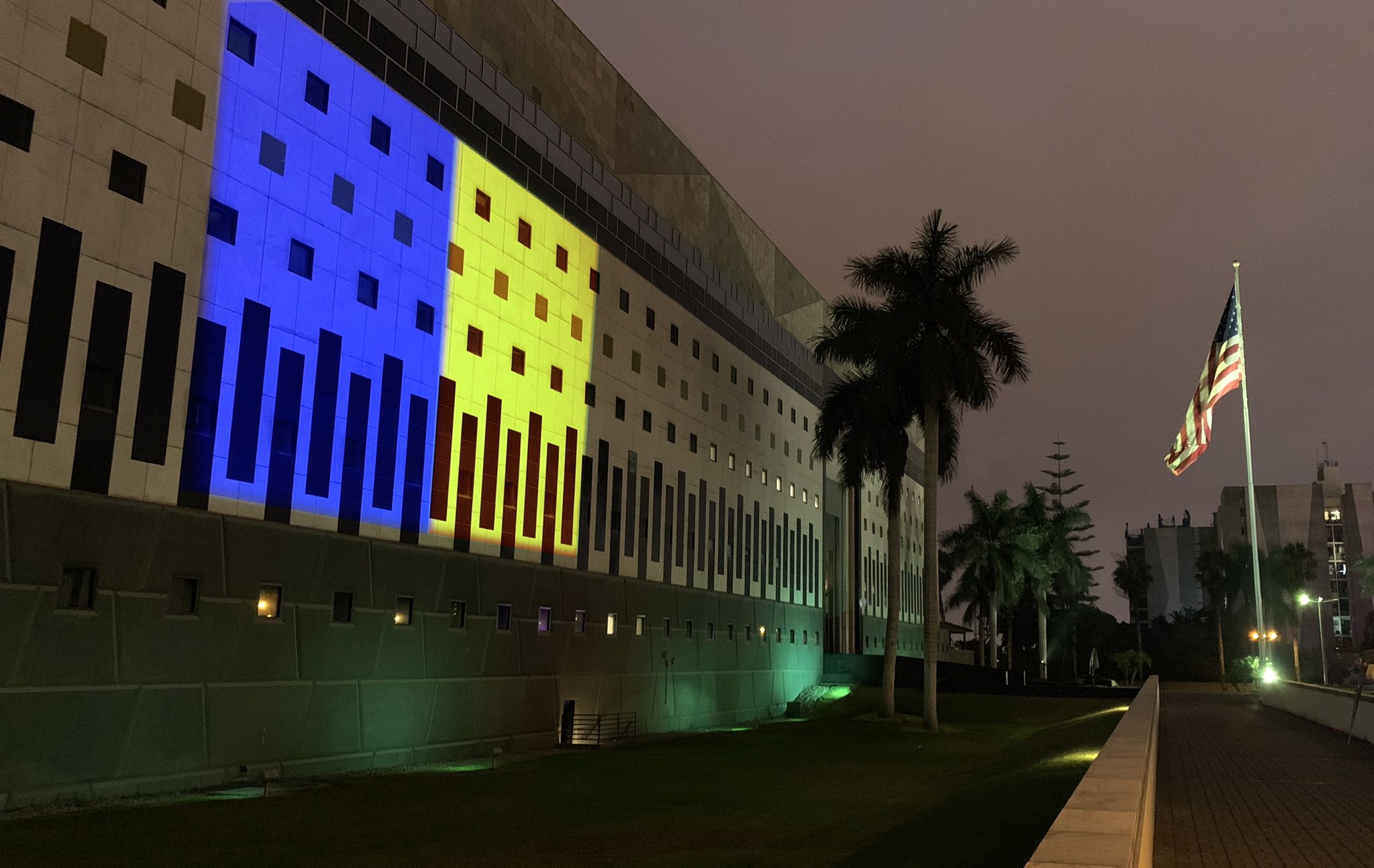
The embassy lit up with the national colours of Ukraine, February 2022

== See also ==
- Peru–United States relations
- Embassy of Peru, Washington, D.C.
- List of ambassadors of the United States to Peru
- List of ambassadors of Peru to the United States
- Embassy of Canada, Lima
