= List of ambassadors of Peru to Switzerland =

Ambassador of Peru to the Swiss Confederation
- Great Seal of Peru
- Ministry of Foreign Affairs; Thunstrasse 36 CH-3005, Bern
- Appointer: The president of Peru
- Inaugural holder: Aníbal Villegas
- Formation: 1893
- Website: Embassy of Peru in Switzerland and Liechtenstein

The extraordinary and plenipotentiary ambassador of Peru to the Swiss Confederation is the official representative of the Republic of Peru to the Swiss Confederation. The ambassador to Switzerland is also accredited to Liechtenstein.

Both countries established relations in 1884, and relations have been maintained since. A Swiss consulate opened in Lima in 1884, being transformed into a consulate general in 1931, before being elevated to the rank of legation in 1946 and embassy in 1957. During World War II, Switzerland represented Peru in Germany, Italy and France, at the same time representing those of the latter in Peru.

== List of representatives ==
Name	Portrait	Term begin	Term end	President	Notes
Aníbal Villegas		1893	1900	Remigio Morales Bermúdez	Minister plenipotentiary
Toribio Sanz		1900	1903	Eduardo López de Romaña	Minister plenipotentiary
Manuel Álvarez-Calderón		1909	1918	Augusto B. Leguía	Minister plenipotentiary
Pablo Sixto Mimbela		1918	1930	José Pardo y Barreda	Minister plenipotentiary
Luis Miró Quesada		1933	1936	Luis Miguel Sánchez Cerro	Minister plenipotentiary
Víctor Andrés Belaúnde		1936	1939	Óscar R. Benavides	Minister plenipotentiary
Ricardo Boza Aizcorbe		1939	1941	Óscar R. Benavides	Minister plenipotentiary
Ventura García Calderón Rey		1941	1948	Manuel Prado Ugarteche	Minister plenipotentiary
Enrique Manchego Herrera		1948	1954	José Luis Bustamante y Rivero	Minister plenipotentiary
José Larrabure Price		1954	1956	Manuel A. Odría	Minister plenipotentiary
William Fry Valle-Riestra		1956	1959	Manuel A. Odría	Minister (1956), then Ambassador
Julio Fernández Dávila		1959	1963	Manuel Prado Ugarteche	Ambassador
Enrique González Dittoni		1963	1963	Nicolás Lindley López	Ambassador
Alfredo Correa Elías		1964	1964	Fernando Belaúnde	Ambassador
Javier Pérez de Cuéllar		1964	1966	Fernando Belaúnde	Ambassador
Alberto Soto de la Jara		1966	1973	Fernando Belaúnde	Ambassador
Jorge Nicholson Sologuren		1973	1979	Juan Velasco Alvarado	Ambassador
Felipe Solari Swayne		1980	1982	Fernando Belaúnde	Ambassador
Antonio Belaúnde Moreyra		1983	1988	Fernando Belaúnde	Ambassador
Rogelio León Seminario		1988	1990	Alan García	Ambassador
Jaime Cacho Souza		1990	1992	Alberto Fujimori	Ambassador
Guillermo Gerdau		1993	1994	Alberto Fujimori	Ambassador
César Castillo Ramírez		1995	2000	Alberto Fujimori	Ambassador
José Arturo Montoya Stuva		2001	2002	Valentín Paniagua	Ambassador
Carlos Pareja Ríos		2002	2005	Alejandro Toledo	Ambassador
Elizabeth Astete		2005	2009	Alejandro Toledo	Ambassador
Juan Carlos Gamarra Skeels		2009	2013	Alan García	Ambassador
Luis Juan Chuquihuara Chil		2013	2016	Ollanta Humala	Ambassador
Thierry Roca-Rey Deladrier		June 2016	2017	Ollanta Humala	Ambassador
Luis Enrique Chávez Basagoitia		2017	2019	Pedro Pablo Kuczynski	Ambassador
Ana Rosa Valdivieso Santa María		2019	2021	Martín Vizcarra	Ambassador
Luis Alberto Castro Joo		January 1, 2022	December 7, 2022	Pedro Castillo	Ambassador

== See also ==
- Peru–Switzerland relations
- List of ambassadors of Switzerland to Peru
