= Quinta Heeren =

Quinta in Lima, Peru

Coordinates: 12.0497°S 77.0178°W

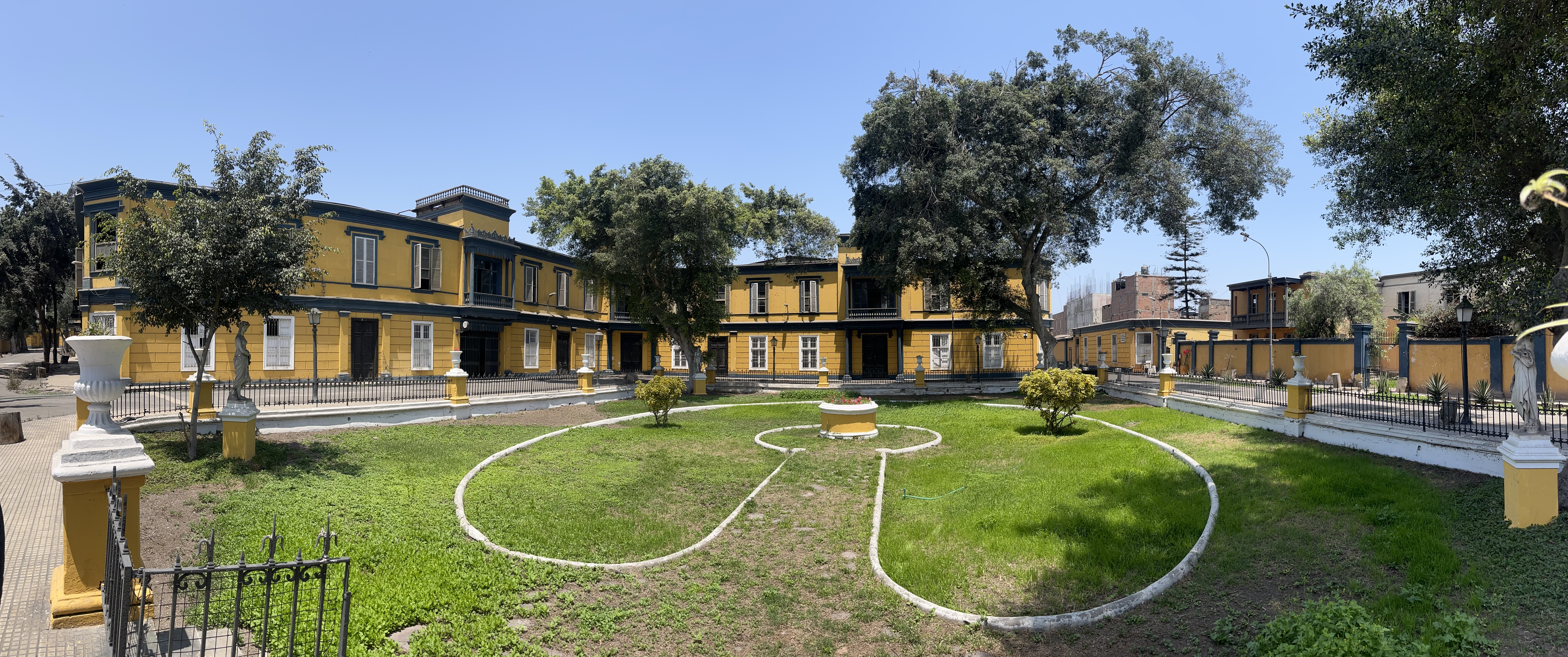
- Main Square
- Interactive map of the Quinta Heeren area

General information
- Location: Barrios Altos, Jirón Junín 1201
- Year built: c. 1880–1890
- Owner: Metropolitan Municipality of Lima; Heeren–Pardo family (to 2025)

Design and construction
- Architect: Óscar Heeren

The Quinta Heeren is a traditional residential estate in Barrios Altos, a neighbourhood of Lima, Peru. Located within the city's historic centre, it occupies a total area of about 36.000 m^{2}. One of the city's first private condominiums, it is named after German–Peruvian merchant Óscar Heeren (originally written Oskar), who commissioned and oversaw its construction during the late 19th century.

The estate was built in the Austro-Hungarian variety of the historicist style, with Victorian and eclectic influences, with local architect Héctor Velarde adding that its architecture is "of a fine neo-classical style." Features include a main square, narrow streets, and gardens adorned with vases and sculptures. It was formerly the site of a zoo and a tennis court, both being the first of their kind in the city, as well as the site of different legations during the early 20th century.

== History ==
Originally called Quinta del Carmen due to its proximity to the church of the same name in Barrios Altos, and inspired by the Parc Monceau in Paris, it was promoted by the German merchant Óscar Antonio Federico Augusto Heeren Massa (1840–1919). It was built in the Austro-Hungarian variety of the historicist style, with Victorian and eclectic influences. Architect Héctor Velarde wrote about the place:

Its exceptional isolation in a shady backwater of old Lima has kept it intact as a small neighborhood of Victorian times... The architecture is of a very fine neo-classicism with smooth and clear cloths.

— Héctor Velarde

Once its construction was completed, it was occupied by Óscar Heeren, relatives, and close friends, among them his son-in-law, the Peruvian politician José Pardo y Barreda. It is through the latter that the succession of owners remained in this family until 2025. An estimate puts the number of families that inhabited the place at about 300. Famous inhabitants of this period include artist Teófilo Castillo and archaeologist Max Uhle.

The Quinta originally featured a zoo and a tennis court, both being the first of their kind in the city, as well as an artificial lagoon with swans. From 1901 to 1940, it housed the diplomatic missions of Japan, Belgium, Germany, France and the United States.

During the 1940s, new buildings were constructed in the terrains close to Maynas Street. The same decade also saw the death of Pochola, a condor that was run over by a trolley after escaping from the premises, after which it was embalmed and displayed in one of the houses due to the residents' emotional attachment to it.

=== Suicide of Seiguma Kitsutani ===
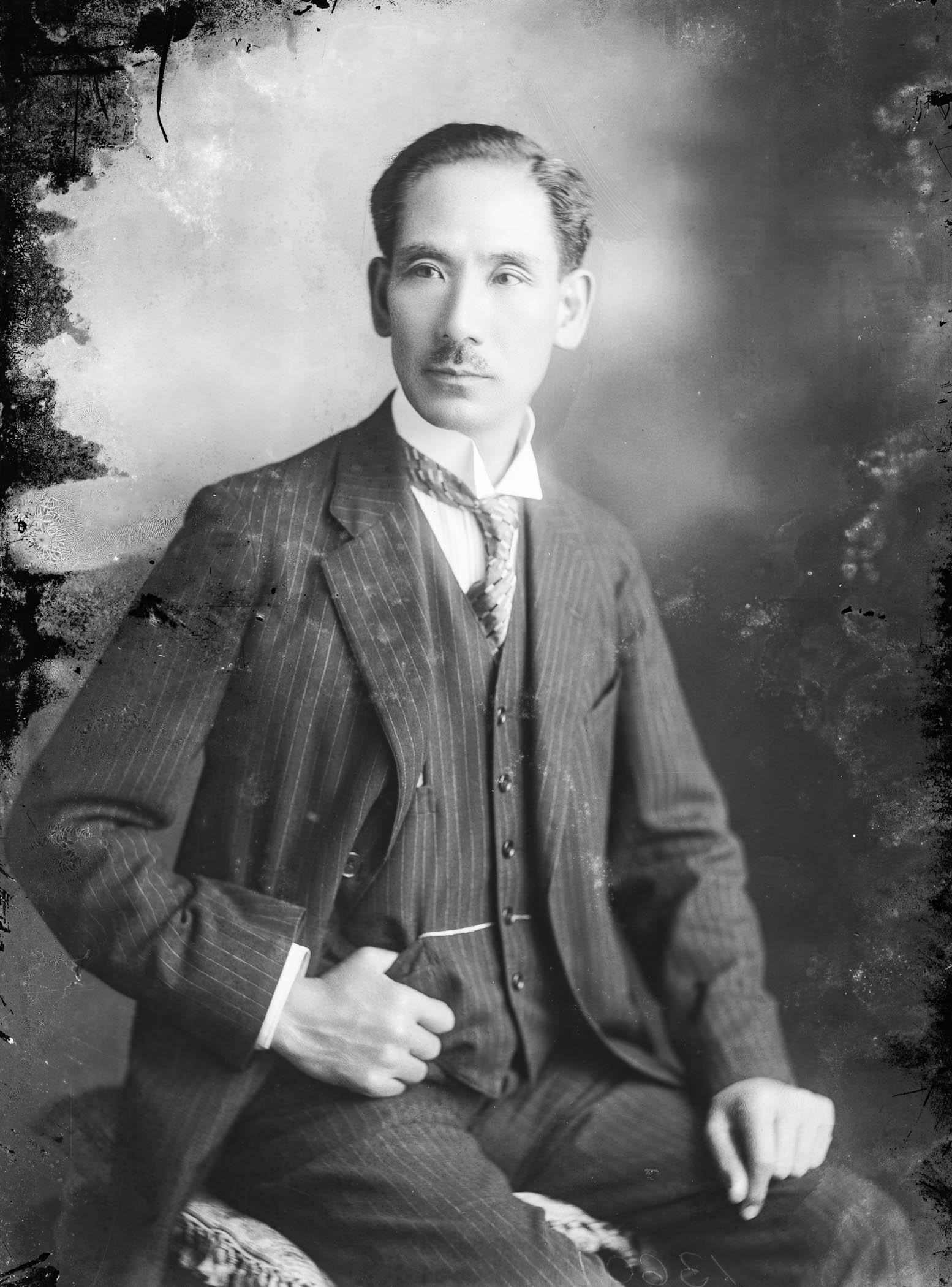
Kitsutani in 1926.

A number of wealthy Japanese immigrants had established a significant presence in the area starting in the 1920s. One of them was Seiguma Kitsutani, who arrived to the country in 1901 to work as a merchant. Kitsutani had set up a store at Plateros de San Agustín, a street in central Lima. He was described at the time of his death as a merchant who had brought novelties of Japan's manufacturing industry to the country. As president of the Japanese community, he gifted the Monument to Manco Cápac to commemorate the country's centennial.

Following an earthquake that affected Kyoto, his business gradually declined and, facing complains and an increasing debt, Kitsutani committed suicide at a room in chalet No. 3, where he was a guest since 1915, on February 24, 1928. He was found on his knees surrounded by blood. A friend of his declared to local newspaper El Comercio that the actions undertaken by him were carried out to atone for his acts. Then-president Augusto B. Leguía commemorated Kitsutani, calling him a friend.

=== Later history ===
The earthquake of 1970 began the estate's decline. It was later declared a cultural heritage monument in 1972. The decade also saw the appearance of the estate's new inhabitants, who would change its traditional character to one described as more "popular," creole and bucolic. Some of them would later become well known in the cultural sphere, such as musician Chino Domínguez, radio announcer Humberto Martínez Morosini and sports journalist Eduardo San Román. In 2006, local authorities began a process to vacate the premises, completed in 2010. In 2016, the 13-building estate was declared uninhabitable, with the owners at the time being unable to cover the expenses to maintain the premises.

The estate was purchased by the Metropolitan Municipality of Lima on October 10, 2025. Prior to its purchase, it was owned by Inversiones Quinta Heeren S.A., a company owned by the Pardo Escandón family, descendants of José Pardo y Barreda, who married his first cousin Carmen Heeren Barreda, daughter of Oscar Heeren. José (b. 1903), the second of the couple's seven children, lived in the Quinta until his old age.

On January 21, 2026, mayor Renzo Reggiardo announced the beginning of the estate's recovery efforts during a ceremony at its main square.

== In popular culture ==
The estate was the subject of Quinta Heeren de noche, a painting by Víctor Humareda commissioned by the Central Reserve Bank of Peru. It was the last painting by Humareda, who died shortly after its completion in 1986. It has also served as a filming location for a number of TV programmes, including La Perricholi and El último bastión.

== Gallery ==
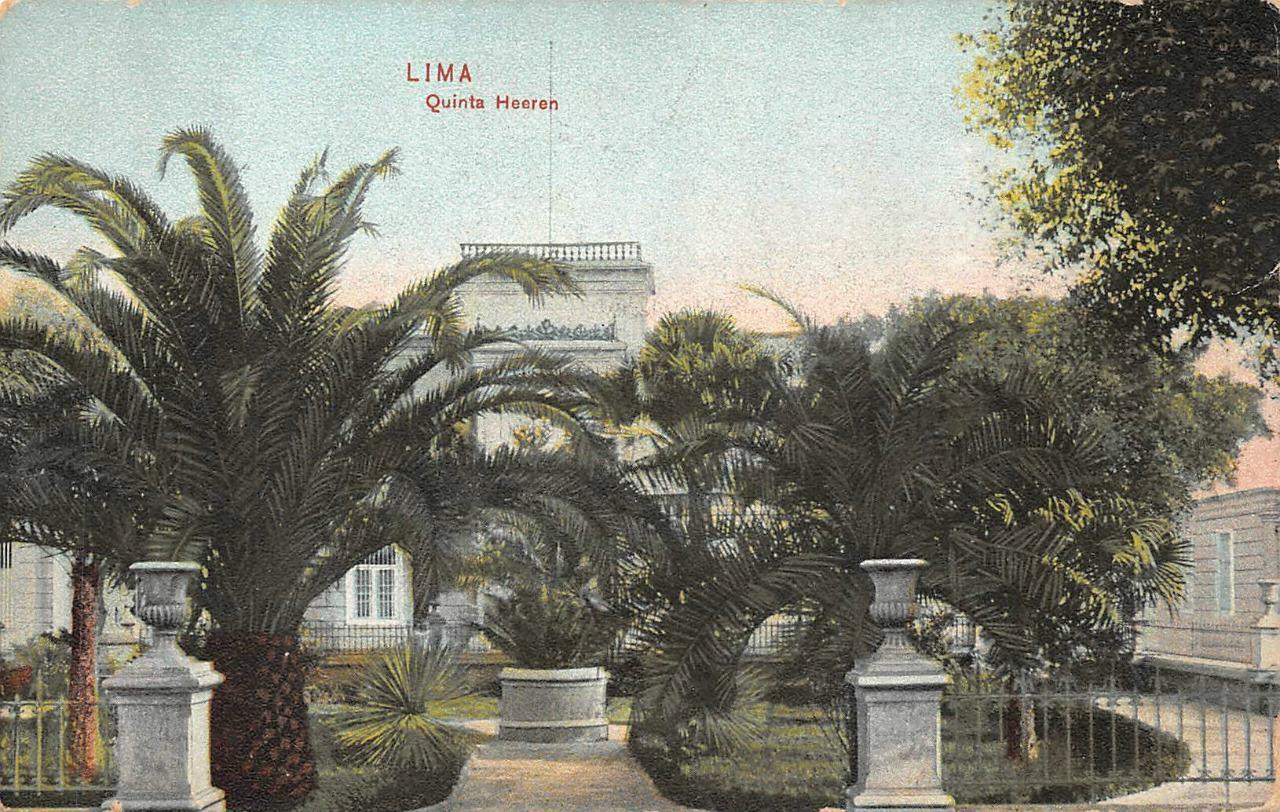
The Quinta in 1908

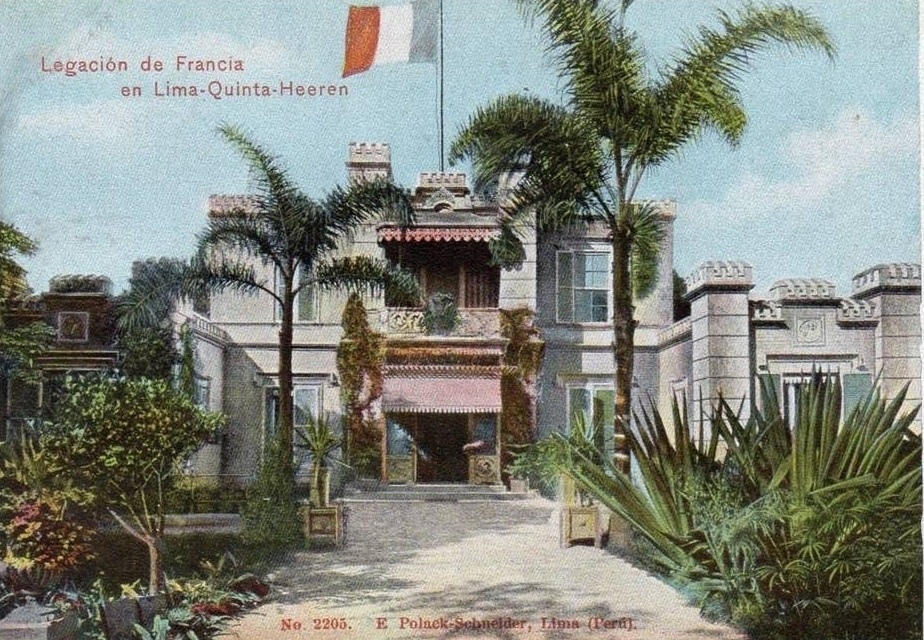
Legation of France

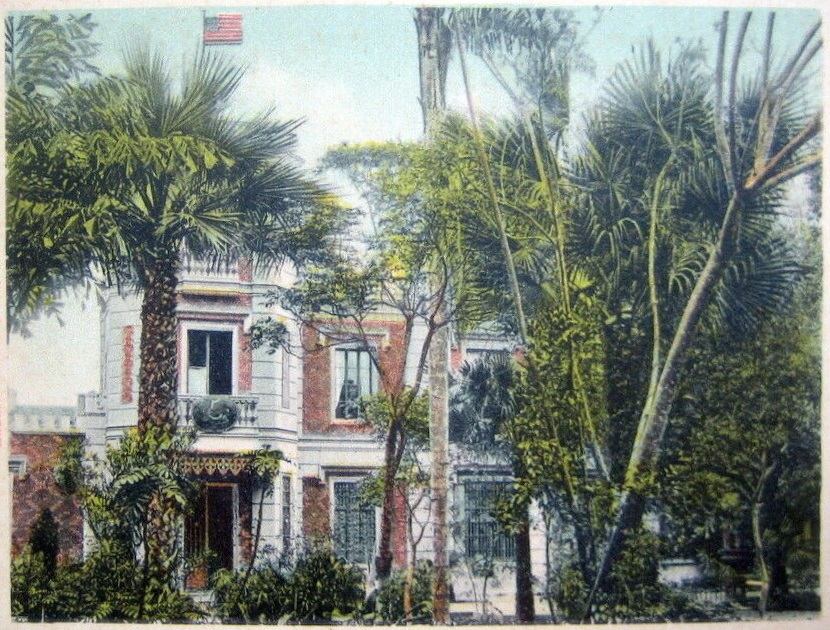
Legation of the U.S.

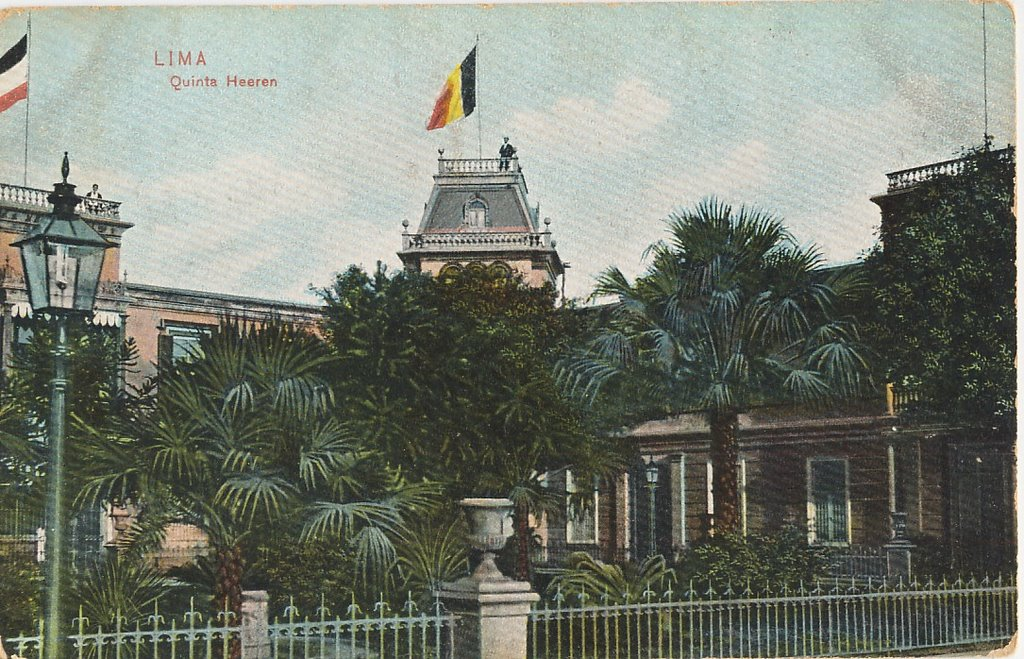
Legations of Germany and Belgium

== See also ==
- Historic Centre of Lima
- Quinta Leuro
- Quinta de Presa
