= List of ambassadors of Switzerland to Peru =

Ambassador of Switzerland to Peru
- Incumbent; Paul Garnier since 2021
- Style: His Excellency
- Appointer: Swiss Federal Council
- Inaugural holder: Robert Weiss
- Website: Switzerland in Peru

The ambassador of Switzerland to Peru is an officer of the Swiss Federal Department of Foreign Affairs and the head of the Embassy of the Swiss Confederation to the Republic of Peru. The position has the rank and status of an ambassador extraordinary and plenipotentiary. From 1946 to 1962, the ambassador was concurrently accredited to Bolivia.

Both countries established relations in 1884, and relations have been maintained since. A Swiss consulate opened in Lima in 1884, being transformed into a consulate general in 1931, before being elevated to the rank of legation in 1946 and embassy in 1957. Peru also has an embassy in Bern.

During World War II, Switzerland represented Peru in Germany, Italy and France, at the same time representing those of the latter in Peru.

== List of representatives ==
Incumbent	Start of term	End of term	Notes
Robert Weiss	1884	1895	As Honorary Consul.
Louis Maurer	1907	1913	As Honorary Consul.
Theodor Huldreich Thomann	1913	1919	As Honorary Consul.
Severino Marcionelli	1922	1946	As Honorary Consul, later Honorary General Consul.
Hans Adolf Berger	1945	1960	As Consul, then ambassador from 1957.
René Faessler	1961	1965	As ambassador.
Hansjörg Hess	1965	1969	As ambassador.
William Frei	1969	1976	As ambassador.
Henri Béglé	1976	1980	As ambassador.
Luciano Mordasini	1980	1984	As ambassador.
Gérard Fonjallaz	1984	1989	As ambassador.
Sylvia Pauli	1989	1992	As ambassador.
Marcus Kaiser	1993	1998	As ambassador.
Eric Martin	1998	2003	As ambassador.
Beat Loeliger	2003	2008	As ambassador.
Peter Müller	2008	2009	As ambassador.
Anne-Pascale Krauer Müller	2009	2013	As ambassador.
Hans-Ruedi Bortis	2013	2016	As ambassador.
Markus Alexander Antonietti	2016	2021	As ambassador.
Paul Garnier	2021	Incumbent	As ambassador.

== See also ==
- Peru–Switzerland relations
- Foreign relations of Switzerland
- List of ambassadors of Peru to Switzerland
