= Quinta Leuro =

Quinta in Lima, Peru

Coordinates: 12°07′44″S 77°01′31″W

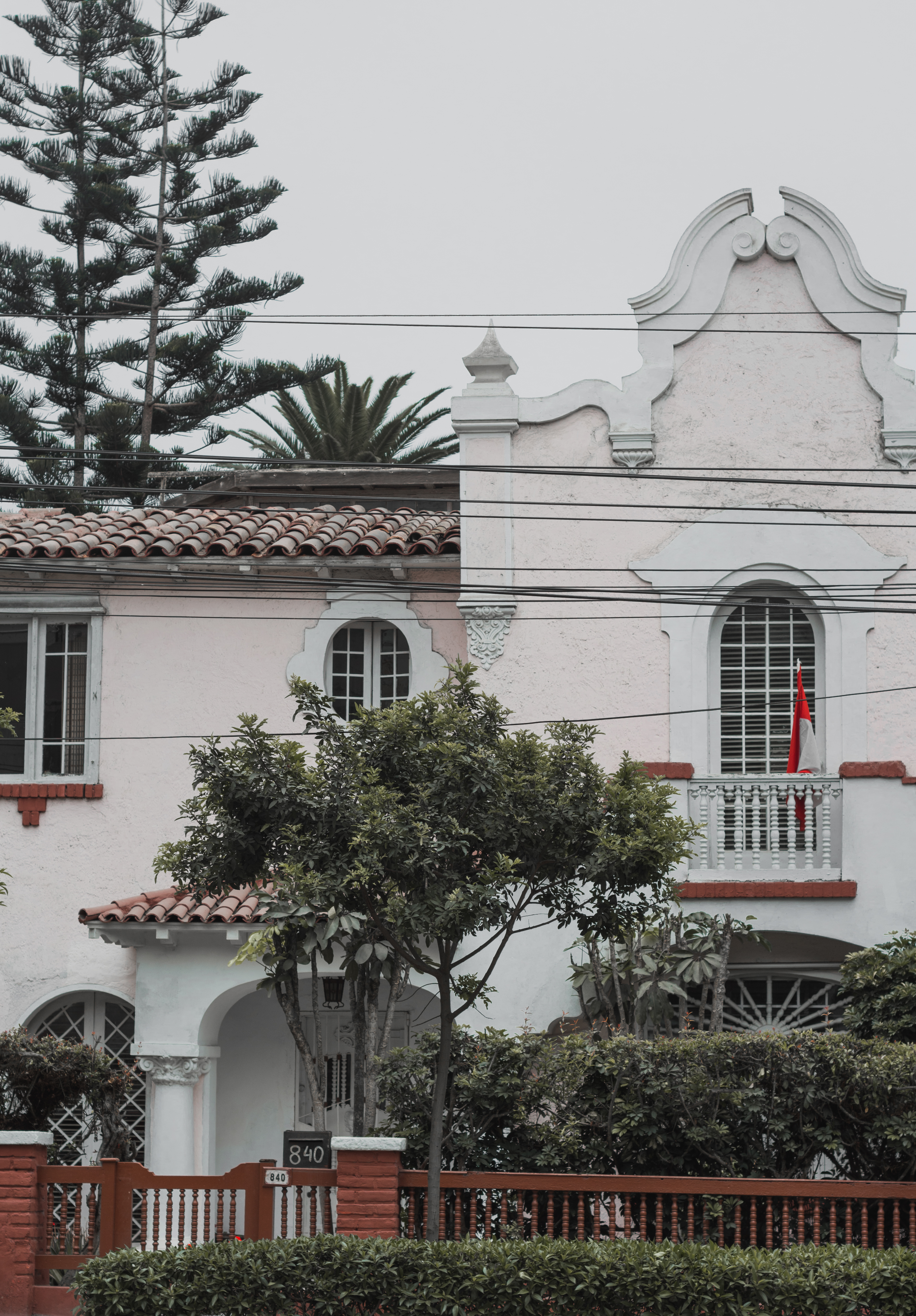
- Interactive map of the Quinta Leuro area

General information
- Architectural style: Eclectic
- Location: Miraflores District, Lima
- Construction stopped: 1927

Design and construction
- Architect: Lidio Mongilardi

The Quinta Leuro is an estate located in the district of Miraflores, Lima, Peru.

== History ==
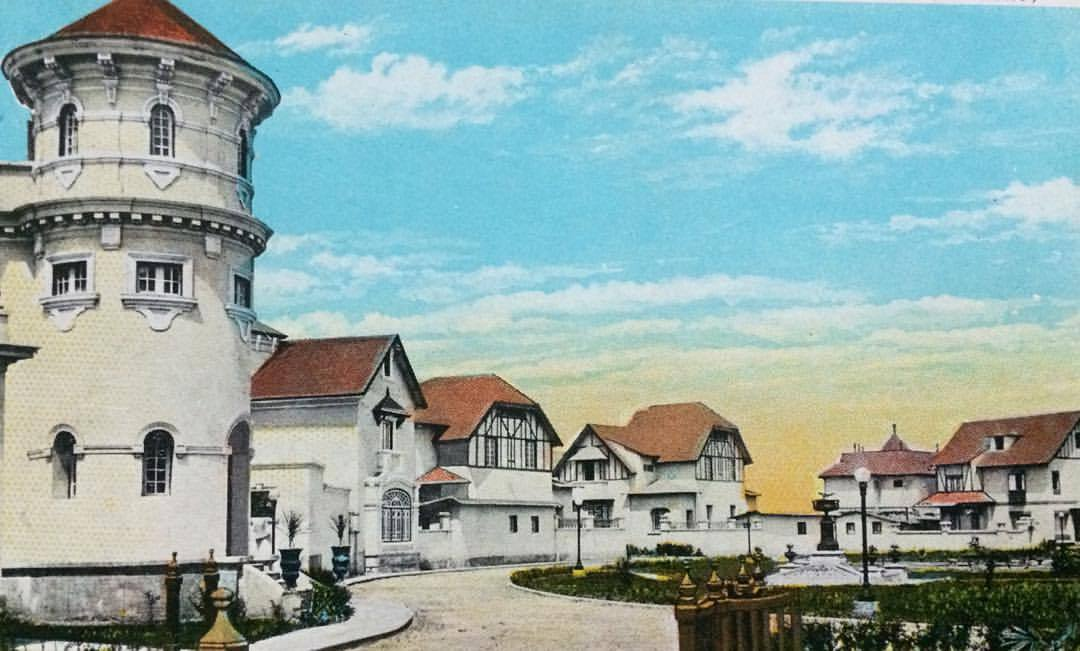
The Leuro neighbourhood in the 20th century.

The villa, located on the 8 block of Avenida 28 de Julio, was planned at the beginning of the 20th century by the Italian architect Lidio Mongilardi on the land of the Leuro urbanization, former farms owned by the bureaucrat Juan José Leuro y Carfanger.

The architectural style of the villa is eclectic, in which neocolonial elements are combined with predominant Mediterranean structures on the Spanish, Italian and French coasts.

This urban space served as the setting for the story Tristes querellas de la vieja quinta by the Peruvian writer Julio Ramón Ribeyro, published in his 1977 book Silvio en El Rosedal.

In 1987 it was declared Cultural Patrimony of the Nation through resolution RM.Nº 302-87-ED.

== See also ==
- Quinta Heeren
- Quinta de Presa
