= Peru–United States relations =

- Peru: United States

Diplomatic mission
- Embassy of Peru, Washington, D.C.: Embassy of the United States, Lima

Envoy
- Peruvian Ambassador to the United States Gustavo Meza-Cuadra Velásquez: American Ambassador to Peru Bernardo Navarro

The Republic of Peru and United States of America (USA) established relations following Peru's independence from Spain in 1826. In the twenty-first century the two countries have become close partners, collaborating in trade with a free trade agreement and in limiting the trafficking of narcotics into the United States.

Both countries are part of the Asia-Pacific Economic Cooperation forum, as well as the Organization of American States.

== History ==
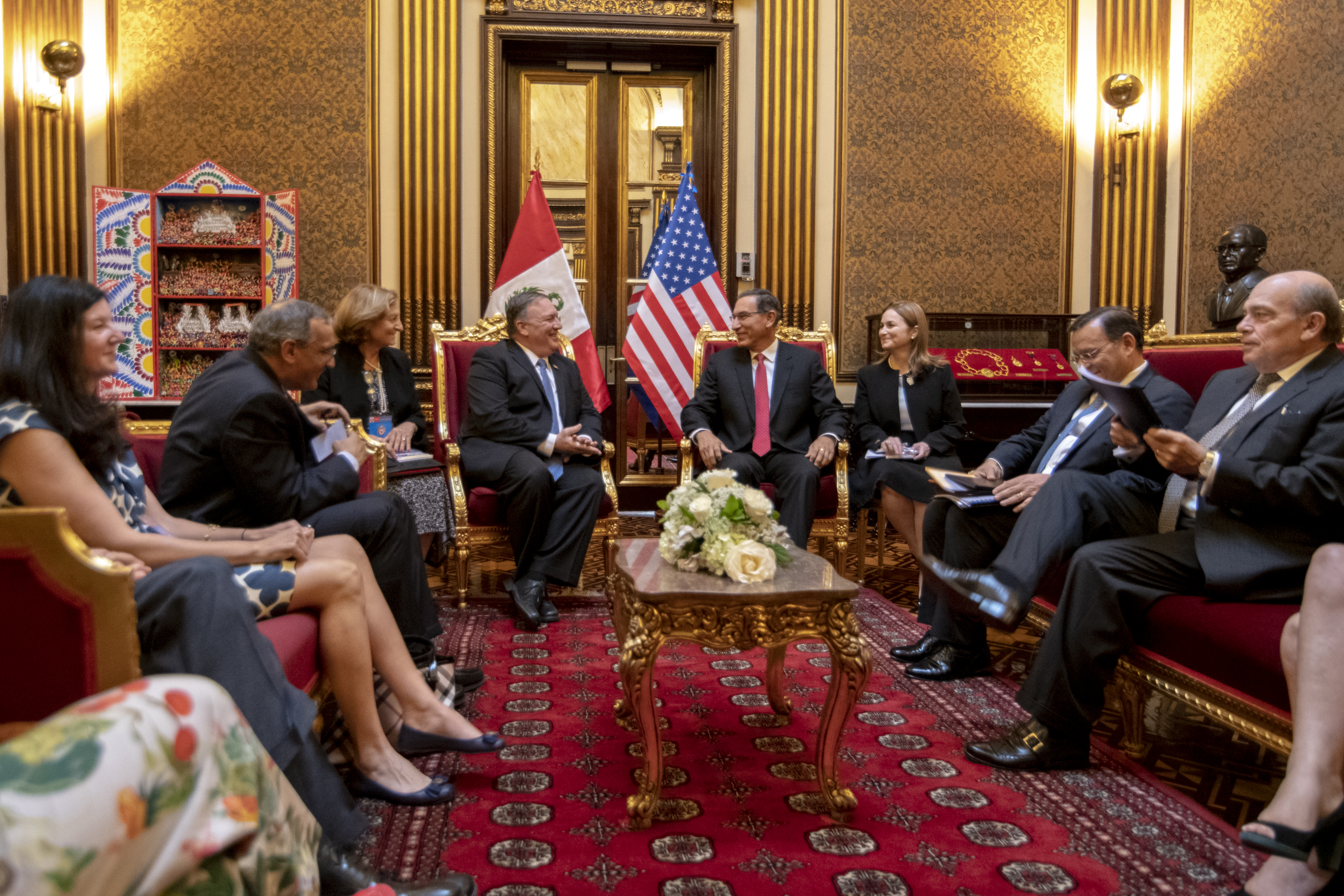
US Secretary of State Mike Pompeo (left) meets with Peruvian President Martin Vizcarra (right) in Lima, April 2019

=== Nineteenth century ===
Peru's independence was recognized by the United States by the appointment of James Cooley as Charge d’Affaires on May 2, 1826.

In 1836 Peru joined the Peru-Bolivian Confederation. The United States recognized the Peru-Bolivian Confederation on March 16, 1837 by the appointment of James B. Thornton as Chargé d’Affaires. Thornton was commissioned to Peru but received by the Peru-Bolivian Confederation. Succeeding Thornton, who died in Peru in January, 1838, J.C. Pickett was appointed Charge d’Affaires on June 8, 1838. He did not present his credentials until January, 1840. This lapse in diplomatic representation may be attributed to the dissolution of the Peru-Bolivian Confederation in 1839.

In December 1846, the Government of Peru named Joaquin José de Osma, as its first Plenipotentiary Minister to the United States.

During the War of the Pacific (1879-1884), the United States favored Peru. It tried to bring an early end to the long-lasting war mostly because of US business and financial interests in Peru.

=== Twentieth century and Cold War relations ===
The Legation at Lima was raised to an Embassy on April 24, 1920, when Ambassador William E. Gonzales presented his credentials to the Peruvian Government.

Through the Cold War, the United States focused its foreign policy of promoting anti-communism in Peru instead of assisting with democratic efforts.

During the administration of Ronald Reagan, Peru felt ignored by the U.S. government. When President Fernando Belaunde Terry visited President Reagan in Washington in 1983, Reagan met with the Peruvian president for only thirty minutes, with one of Reagan's aides saying "[President Belaunde] wasn't even offered a cup of tea".

Relations reached their lowest point during the United States invasion of Panama of 1989 when Peru recalled its ambassador in protest of American military actions. However, relations were restored and have recovered and vastly expanded in the decades since.

The United States strongly supported the presidency of Alberto Fujimori under Plan Verde, of which Fujimori mainly served as a figurehead for Vladimiro Montesinos, a Peruvian intelligence official with deep links to the Central Intelligence Agency. The United States also supported Fujimori through his seizure of power and an internal insurgency.

=== Twenty-first century ===
Though the American government had originally expressed strong support for his government, relations were strained following the tainted reelection of former President Alberto Fujimori in June 2000.

After the abrupt ending to Fujimori's third term and the installation of an interim government in November 2000, relations improved. Relations remained positive during the administration of Alejandro Toledo who took office in July 2001, and during that of Alan García.

In 2002, nine people died when a car bomb detonated by suspected rebels in the Peruvian capital just days before a visit from American President George W. Bush.

During its time as a non-permanent member of the UN Security Council from 2006 to 2007, Peru—despite having refrained from openly participating in George Bush's "War on terror" itself—alongside the U.S. and the West, repeatedly voted in favor of extending the authorization mandate of the International Security Assistance Force in Afghanistan, and increasing sanctions against Iran over its controversial nuclear program.

The U.S. and Peruvian governments criticized North Korea's 2006 nuclear test. Peru urged North Korea to unconditionally return to the six-party talks and to suspend all activity related to its nuclear program.

In 2007, Peruvian Foreign Minister José Antonio García Belaúnde said that his country opposed America's occupation of Iraq, and called for the immediate withdrawal of US military forces from the country, noting that the Iraqi situation was very complex and that the invasion had been a mistake.

In 2008, Peru joined the U.S. and its allies in recognizing Kosovo, and ultimately refused to recognize South Ossetia and Abkhazia, yet opposed the U.S. and Israel by recognizing Palestine in 2011, claiming "no pressure from any side".

In reaction to the Libyan Civil War, Peru became the first country to cut ties with Libya "until the violence against the people ceases" as a result of the aerial bombing of Tripoli.

Upon the death of Osama bin Laden in 2011, Garcia credited the death of bin Laden to late and recently beatified Pope John Paul II, saying, "His first miracle was to remove from the world the incarnation of evil, the demonic incarnation of crime and hatred..." He also said that bin Laden's death "vindicates George W. Bush's decision to punish Bin Laden and patiently continue this work that has borne fruit".

In 2012, the Cuzco Consulate assisted a group of American backpackers who were attacked by Peruvian villagers who suspected the group were "cattle rustlers".

Peru's Deputy Foreign Minister José Beraún Araníbar condemned "the excesses committed by the government of Syria" in a 2012 interview, stressing that Peru saw a political dialogue as the only viable means of peace enforcement and supported a joint UN/Arab League initiative to this effect, indicating Peru would not likely support a U.S. intervention.

In June 2013, Peruvian President Ollanta Humala visited the White House and together with U.S. President Barack Obama promised to strengthen ties between both nations, including in the fight against narcotics trafficking and in tightening economic ties.

The US government condemned Pedro Castillo's attempted self-coup in December 2022 and welcomed the appointment of Dina Boluarte as president. Castillo eventually alleged that the United States aided his removal. The US also initially supported Boluarte amidst civil unrest against her government and allegations of authoritarianism. Relations have deteriorated under the government of her after the U.S condemned Peru for human rights violations. 15 Democratic members of Congress also condemned the Peruvian government, expressing concern over the 'authoritarian' practices Congress of the Republic. Relations were further complicated after President Joe Biden was widely criticized for describing Boluarte's government as democratic, while democratic backsliding has reportedly hit an all time high in Peru.

In November 2024, President Joe Biden traveled to Peru to attend the APEC Summit held in Lima.

== Public opinion ==
According to Gallup, Inc. polls, Peruvian public perception of the United States is mixed, with 51% of Peruvians viewing the U.S. favorably in 2017 (compared to 61% approval of China, respectively) and 55% of Peruvians viewing American influence positively in 2013. According to a Gallup poll discussing confidence in the president of the United States, 17% of Peruvians approved of U.S. leadership, with 77% disapproving. According to a 2026 Pew Research Center survey, 51% of Peruvians had a favorable view of the United States, while 37% had a negative view.

== Resident diplomatic missions ==
diplomatic missions of Peru in the United States

- Washington, D.C. (Embassy)
- Atlanta (Consulate-General)
- Boston (Consulate-General)
- Chicago (Consulate-General)
- Dallas (Consulate-General)
- Denver (Consulate-General)
- Hartford (Consulate-General)
- Houston (Consulate-General)
- Los Angeles (Consulate-General)
- Miami (Consulate-General)
- New York City (Consulate-General)
- Orlando (Consulate-General)
- Paterson (Consulate-General)
- Phoenix (Consulate-General)
- Salt Lake City (Consulate-General)
- San Francisco (Consulate-General)

diplomatic missions of the United States in Peru

- Lima (Embassy)
- Cusco (Consular Agency)

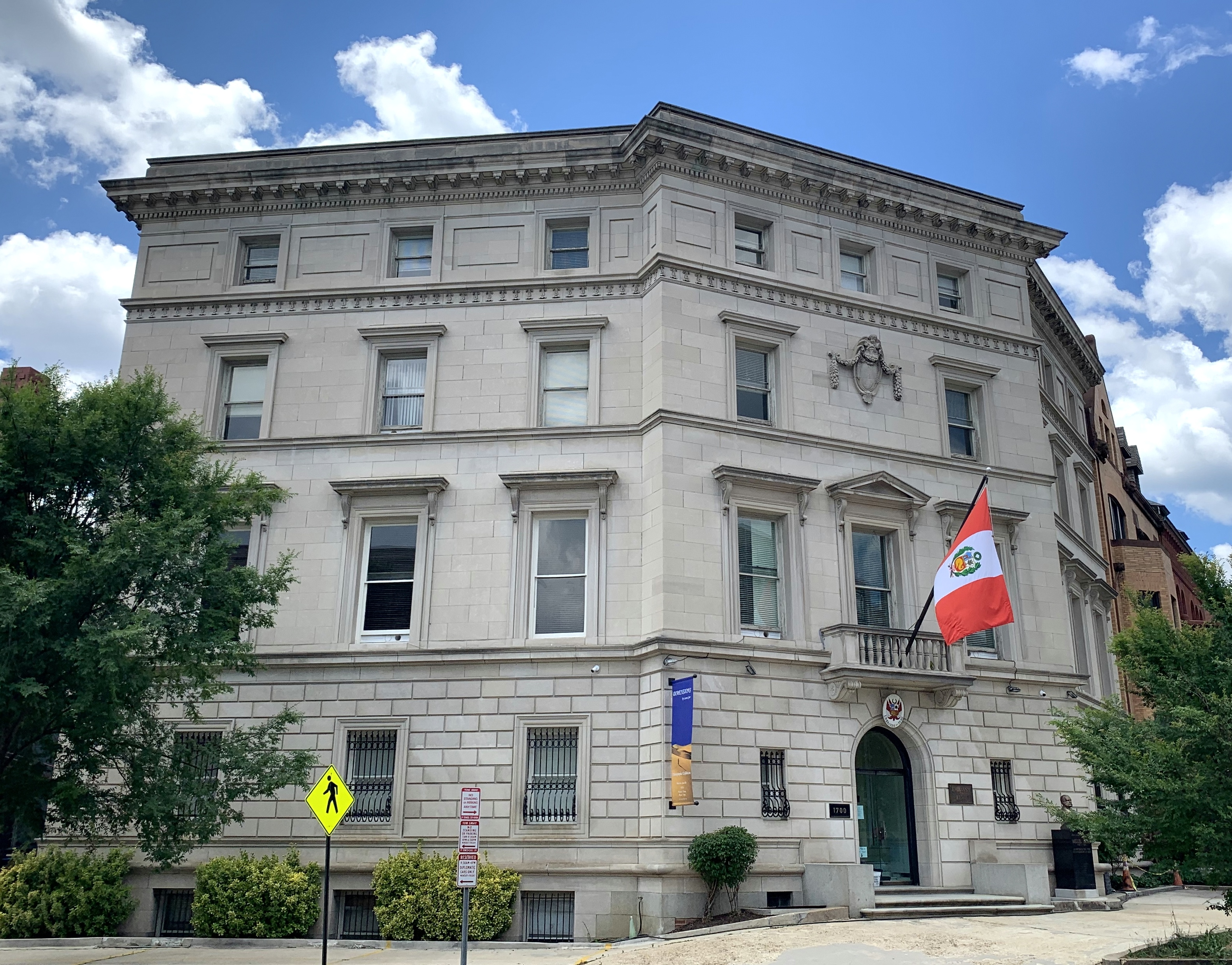
Peruvian Embassy in Washington, D.C.

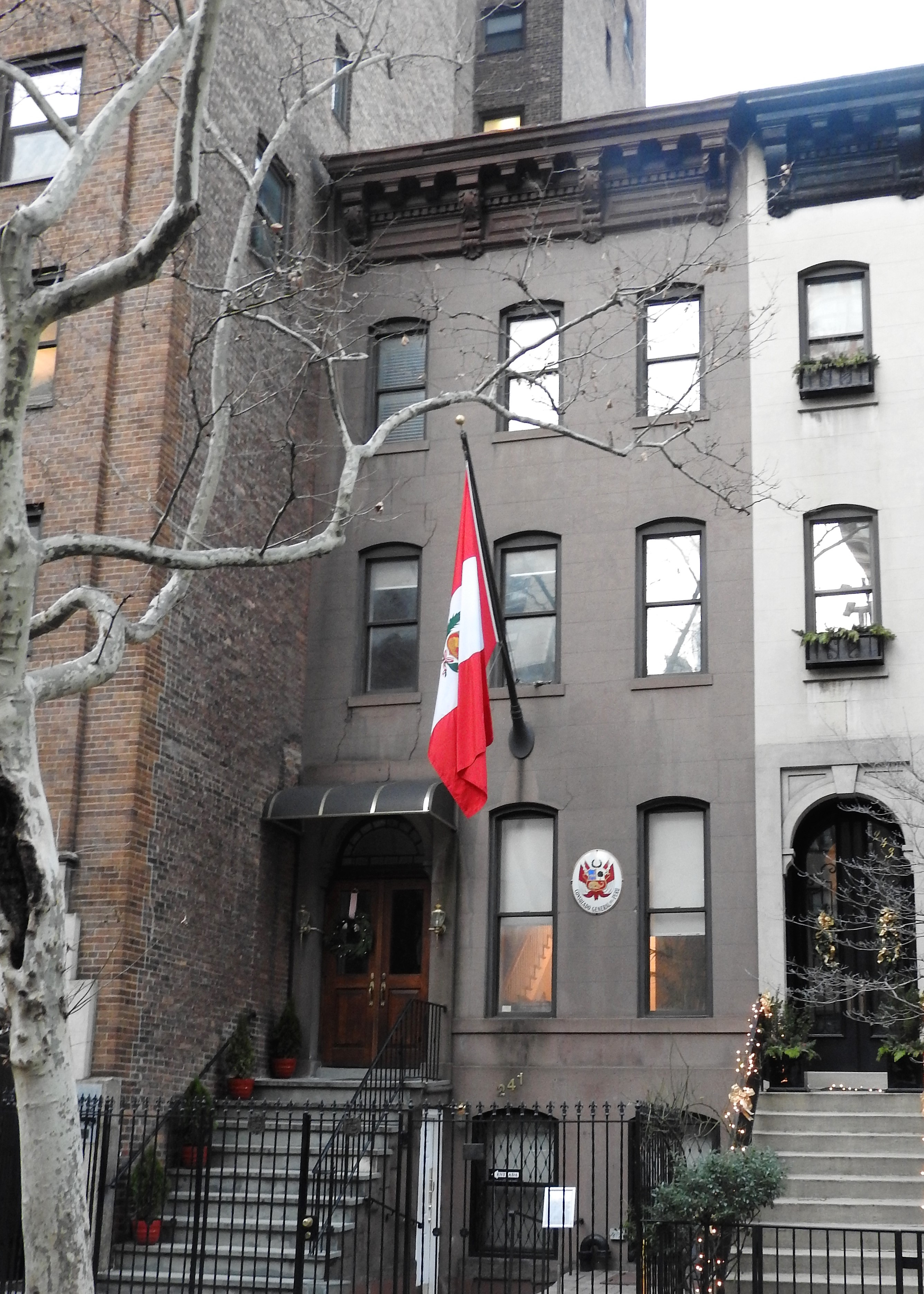
Peruvian Consulate-General in New York City

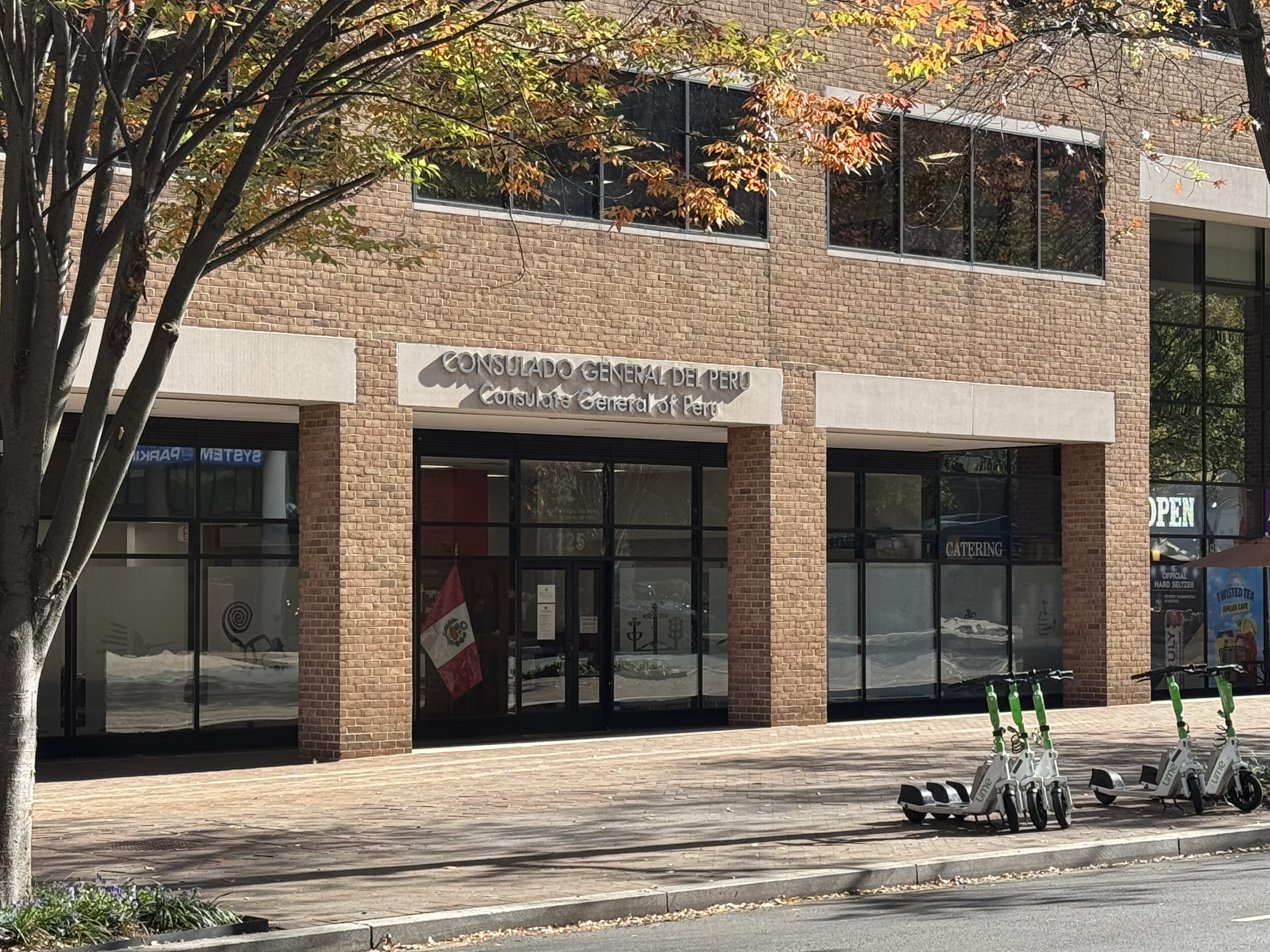
Peruvian Consulate-General in Washington, D.C.
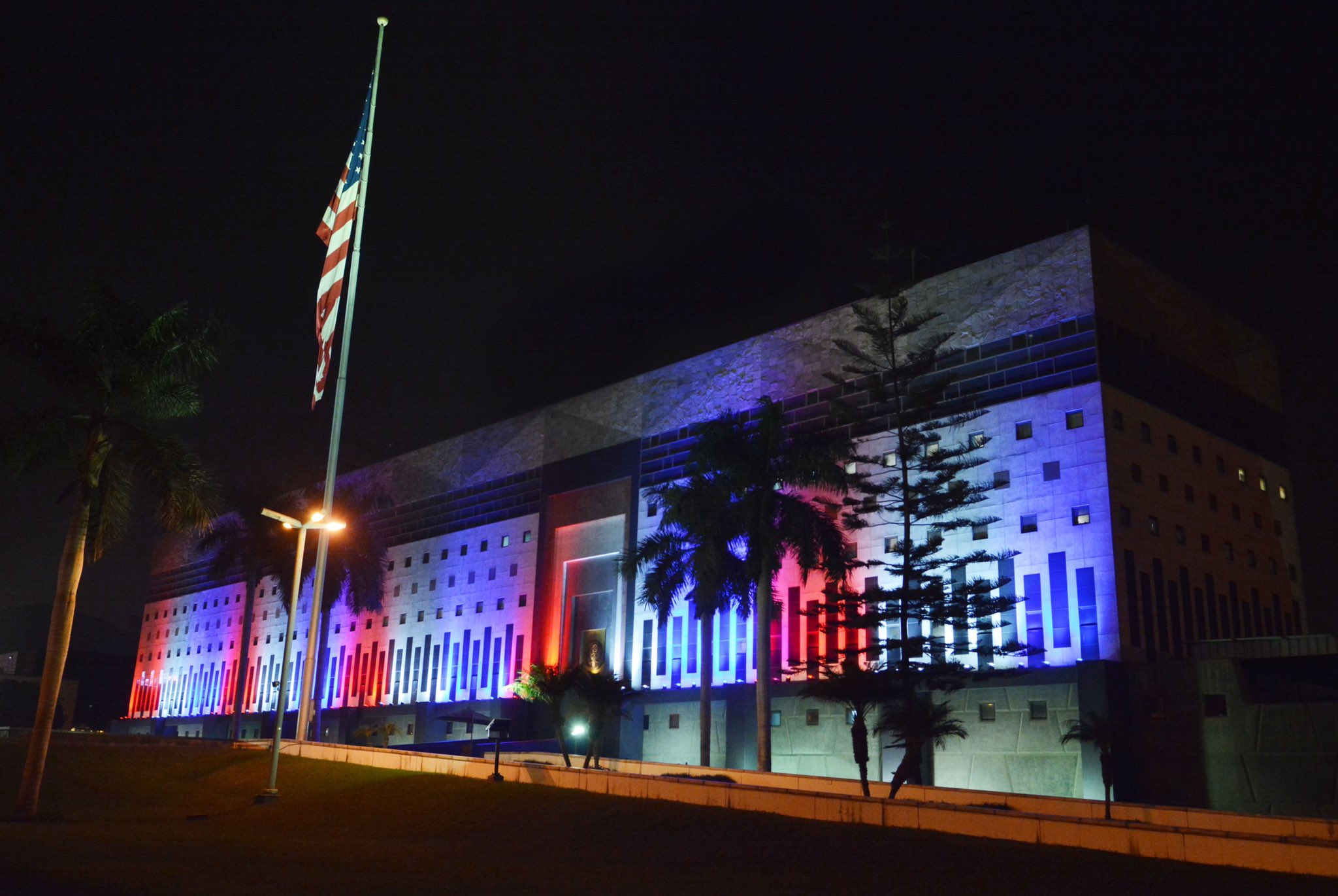
U.S. Embassy in Lima

== Trade and economy ==
U.S. investment and tourism in Peru have grown substantially in recent years. The U.S. is Peru's number one trade partner, and economic and commercial ties will deepen if the U.S.–Peru Trade Promotion Agreement (PTPA) is passed by the U.S. Congress. About 200,000 U.S. citizens visit Peru annually for business, tourism, and study. About 16,000 Americans reside in Peru, and more than 400 U.S. companies are represented in the country.

== Strategic partnerships ==
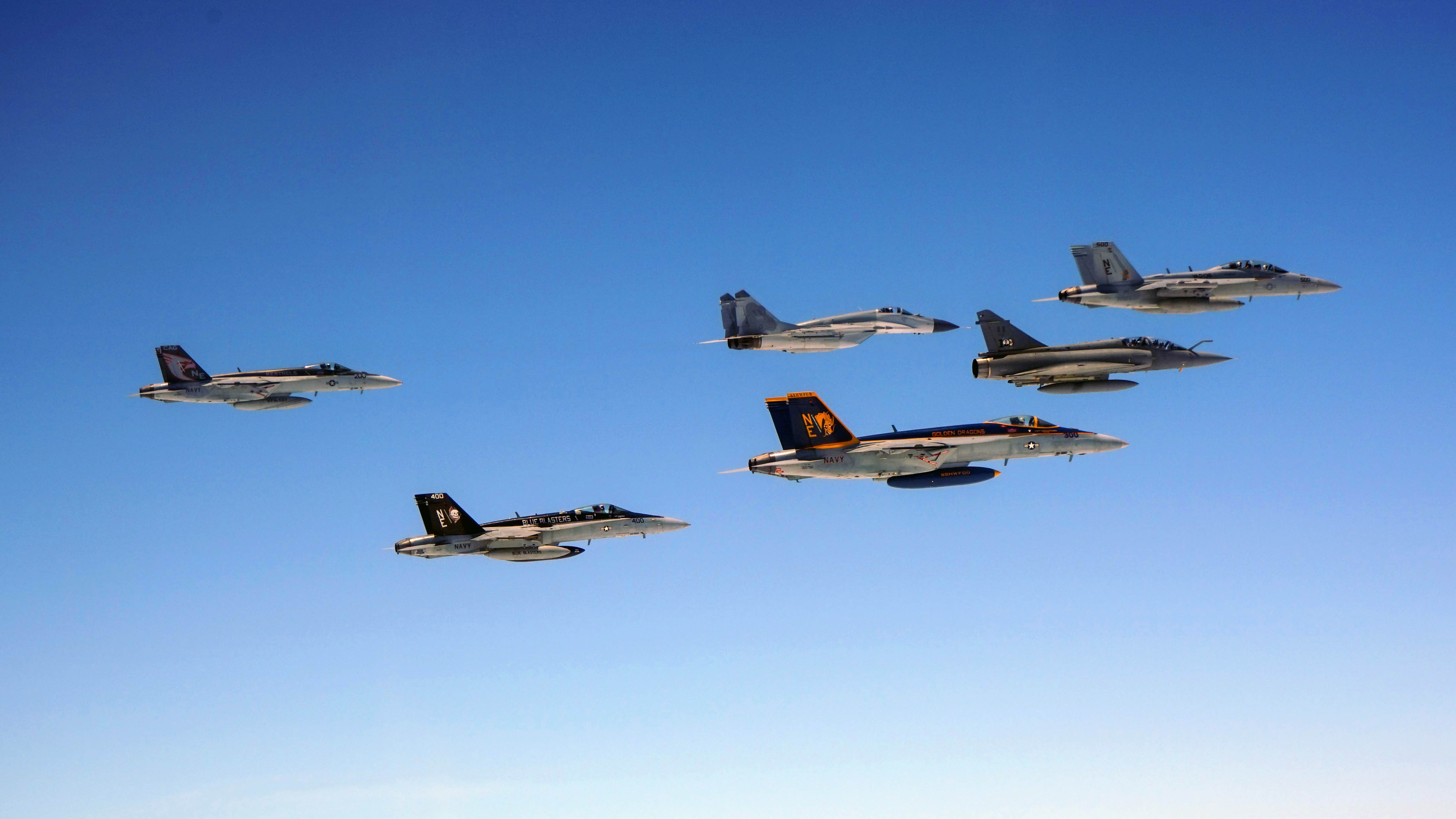
Peruvian MiG-29 and Mirage 2000 flying beside aircraft of the United States Navy

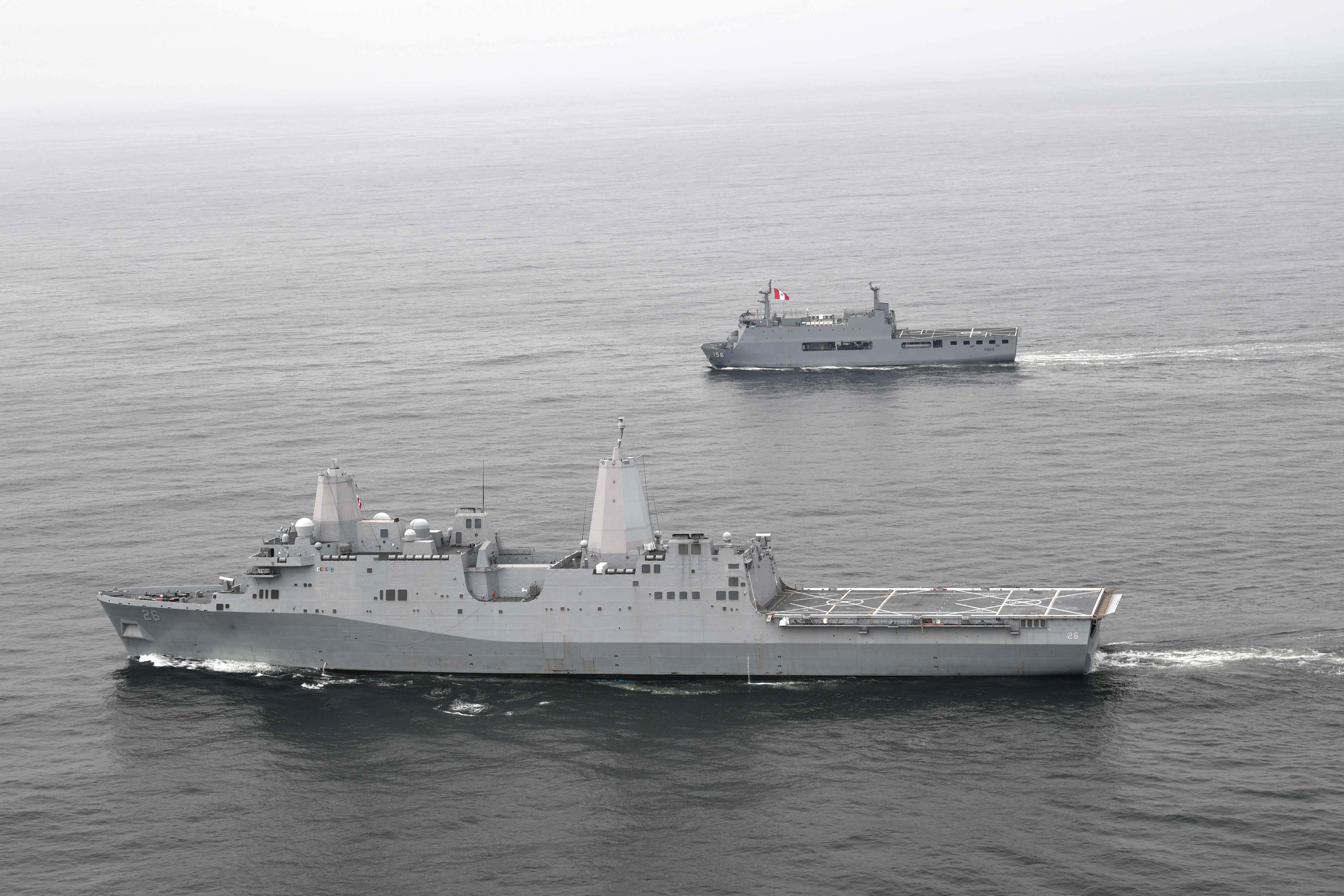
The USS John P. Murtha (LPD-26) (foreground) and BAP Pisco (AMP-156) (background) conduct a joint training exercise in the eastern Pacific in 2021

=== Illicit substances ===
The United States and Peru cooperate on efforts to interdict the flow of narcotics, particularly cocaine, to the United States. Bilateral programs are now in effect to reduce the flow of drugs through Peru's port systems and to perform ground interdiction in tandem with successful law enforcement operations. These U.S. Government-supported law enforcement efforts are complemented by an aggressive effort to establish an alternative development program for coca farmers in key coca growing areas to voluntarily reduce and eliminate coca cultivation. This effort is funded by the Department of State's Bureau for International Narcotics and Law Enforcement Affairs (INL) and the U.S. Agency for International Development (USAID).

=== Military ===
Peru remains part of SICOFAA (whose creation was proposed by the Peruvian Air Force in 1964) and the Rio Pact, requiring it and the U.S. to assist each other in case of attack, and continues to be a regular participant in RIMPAC, an international maritime military exercise led by the U.S. to promote stability throughout the Pacific in the event of potential conflicts ranging from China invading Taiwan or North Korean aggression against its neighbors.

== See also ==
- Foreign relations of Peru
- Foreign relations of the United States
- Embassy of Peru, Washington, D.C.
- Ambassadors of Peru to the United States
- Embassy of the United States, Lima
- Ambassadors of the United States to Peru
- Latin America–United States relations
- CIA activities in Peru
- Peruvian North American Cultural Institute
