= Quinta de Presa =

Quinta in Lima, Peru

Coordinates: 12°02′10″S 77°01′57″W

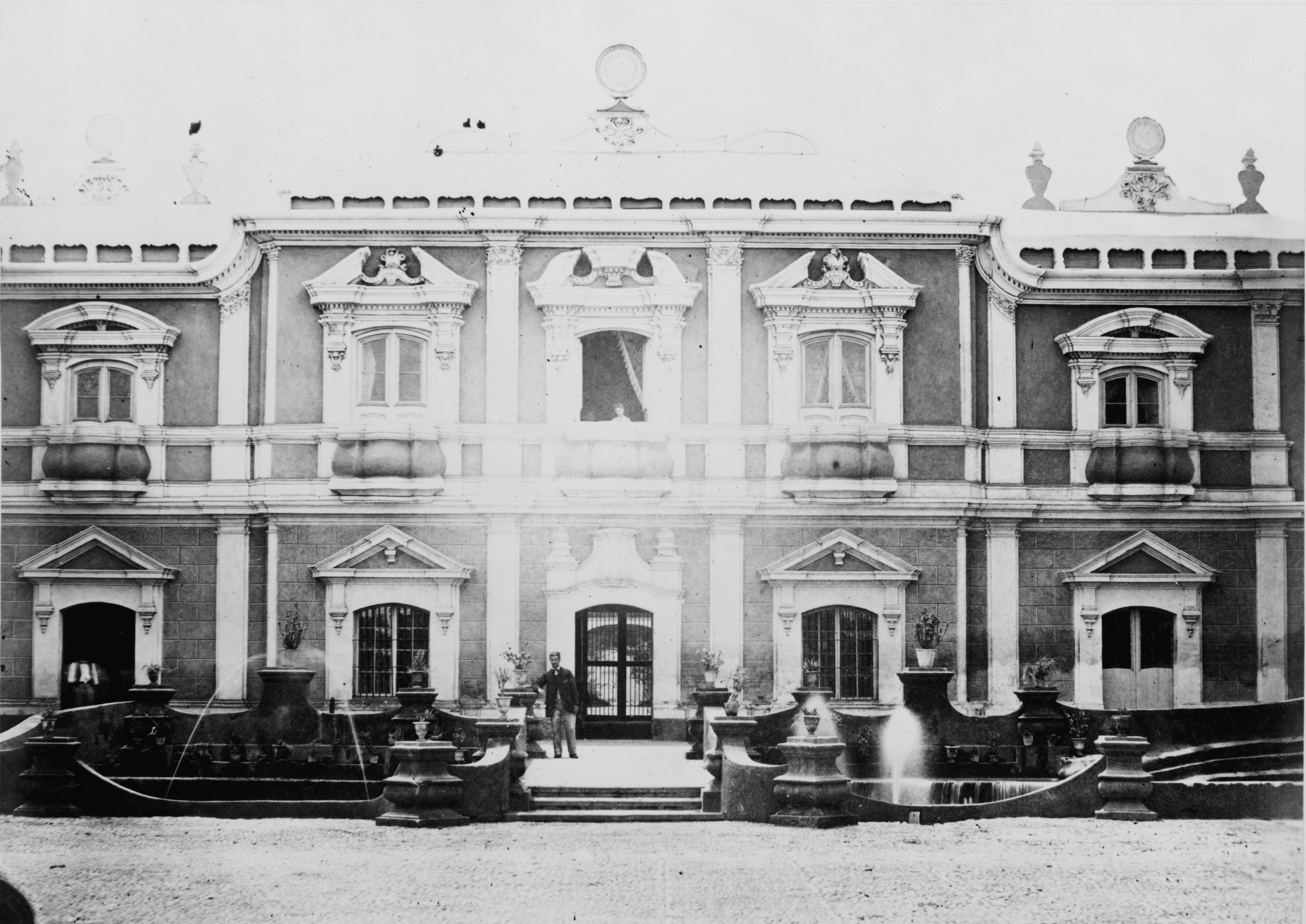
- Interactive map of the Quinta de Presa area

General information
- Architectural style: Rococo
- Location: Jirón Chira 344
- Owner: Ministry of Culture

Design and construction
- Architect: Juan de la Roca

The Quinta de Presa (mistakenly called the Perricholi Palace) is a French-style country mansion built in the 18th century during the government of the then viceroy of Peru, Manuel de Amat y Junyent. It comprises a constructed area of 15,159 square metres (163,170 sq ft). It is located in the jirón Chira of the Rímac district, Lima, Peru.

== History ==
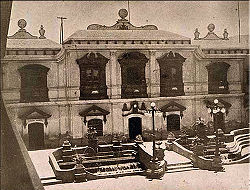
The Quinta in 1932.

The Quinta was the ancestral home of the aristocratic family Carrillo de Albornoz (Counts of Montemar) and Bravo de Lagunas (Counts of Monteblanco). However, the name of the farm is due to its best-known owner, Isabel Carrillo de Albornoz y de la Presa, sister of the 4th Count of Montemar. It was built in the 18th century, outside the perimeter of the old walls of Lima, on the other side of the Rímac River. The property is in the French Baroque or Rococo style, adapted to the climate of the capital and the conditions of the construction materials. It was declared a national historic monument in 1972.

It was used by Banco de la Vivienda, which, through an agreement with the National Institute of Culture of Peru, began the restoration, making it able to return to showing the French style -in game rooms, dining rooms and chapel- that made it famous. It was the headquarters of the "Guardia de Lima" Cavalry Gendarmes Squad (which, due to the police reform carried out by President Augusto B. Leguía, became the "Guardia de Lima" Security Cavalry Squadron) and on February 5, In 1932 it became the National Headquarters of the Infantry Gendarmes Regiment, Republican Guard of Peru and later the headquarters of the Museum of Viceroyalty Art.

This historical monument is currently under the administration of the Ministry of Culture.

=== Restoration ===
In 2019, the then director of the National COPESCO Plan (PCN), José Vidal Fernández, indicated that the structure was going to begin a restoration process as part of the recovery list proposed by the World Monuments Fund.

In June 2021, the Minister of Foreign Trade and Tourism, Claudia Cornejo, announced that the obstacles that paralyzed the project were resolved and that, as part of the Commemoration Agenda for the Bicentennial of the Independence of Peru, the development will begin. of the technical file and the prompt execution of the works, which will cost approximately S/. 24 million. The restoration work, as planned, will conclude in 2024.

== See also ==
- Quinta Leuro
- Quinta Heeren
