= Pareja (disambiguation) =

Pareja is a municipality in Castilla–La Mancha, Spain.

Notable people with the surname Pareja include:

- Alfredo Pareja Diezcanseco (1908–1993), Ecuadorian novelist, essayist, journalist, historian and diplomat
- Bartolomé Ramos de Pareja (ca. 1440–1522), Spanish mathematician, music theorist, and composer
- Carlos Pareja Ríos (b. 1950), Peruvian diplomat
- Eusebio Sánchez Pareja, 18th-century Spanish colonial official in New Spain
- Francisco Pareja (ca. 1570–1628), Franciscan missionary in Spanish Florida
- Francisco de Rivera y Pareja (1561–1637), Spanish prelate
- Gustavo Pareja Cisneros (b. 1947), Ecuadorian politician
- Isabel Rosales Pareja (1895–1961), Ecuadorian pianist
- Jennifer Pareja Lisalde (b. 1984) Spanish water polo player
- Jésus Pareja (b. 1955), Spanish racing driver
- José Antonio Pareja (1757–1813), Spanish admiral
- José Manuel Pareja (1813–1865), Spanish admiral
- Juan de Pareja (c. 1606–1670), Spanish painter
- Julieta Pareja (b. 2009), American tennis player
- Manuel Pareja Obregón (1933–1995), Spanish musician and composer
- Miguel Donoso Pareja (1931–2015), Ecuadorian writer
- Nicolás Pareja (b. 1984), Argentine professional footballer
- Óscar Pareja (b. 1968), Colombian professional football player and manager
- Pedro Pareja Duque (b. 1989), commonly known as Pedrito, Spanish footballer
- Rafael Pérez Pareja (1836–1897), Ecuadorian politician
- Susana Pareja Ibarra (b. 1973), Spanish handball player and coach

== See also ==
- Portrait of Juan de Pareja
- Vivanco–Pareja Treaty
