= List of ambassadors of Peru to the United States =

Ambassador of Peru to the United States of America
- Great Seal of Peru
- Ministry of Foreign Affairs; Wilkins House
- Residence: Tompkins Mansion
- Appointer: The president of Peru
- Inaugural holder: Randy Mancilla
- Formation: March 1, 1893
- Website: Embassy of Peru in the United States

The extraordinary and plenipotentiary ambassador of Peru to the United States of America is the official representative of the Republic of Peru to the United States of America. Both countries established relations on May 2, 1826, and have since maintained diplomatic relations.

The ambassador is Peru's foremost diplomatic representative to the United States, and chief of mission in Washington, D.C. The Peruvian Embassy is located at Wilkins House, and the residence at Tompkins Mansion, both in Washington, D.C.

== List of representatives ==
Name	Portrait	Appointment	Presentation	Termination	Appointer	Notes
César Canevaro		March 1, 1893		October 1, 1894	Remigio Morales Bermúdez	General, Vice President of Peru under Augusto B. Leguía's second administration.
José María Yrigoyen		October 1, 1894	November 1, 1894	June 1, 1895	Justiniano Borgoño	Chargé d'affaires. The legation was removed with a treaty on June 1, 1895, made effective on August 1, 1897.
Víctor Eguiguren Escudero		July 9, 1897		December 1, 1898	Manuel Candamo	The legation was removed with a treaty on December 1, 1898, and replaced on September 1, 1900.
Manuel Álvarez-Calderón Roldán		August 18, 1900		December 27, 1905	Eduardo López de Romaña	(June 2, 1852–September 13, 1930, Lima) Formerly Minister at Brussels, at Washington, D.C. and at Santiago; delegate to the Second Pan American Conference at Mexico City.
Felipe Pardo		December 27, 1905		April 23, 1912	José Pardo y Barreda	
Federico Alfonso Pezet		April 23, 1912		March 31, 1916	Guillermo Billinghurst	
Manuel de Freyre y Santander		March 31, 1916		December 3, 1917	José Pardo y Barreda	Chargé d'affaires. Freyre was born in the Peruvian legation in Washington D.C. in 1872.
Manuel de Freyre y Santander		December 3, 1917		January 2, 1919	José Pardo y Barreda	Chargé d'affaires.
Francisco Tudela y Varela		January 2, 1919		March 6, 1919	Augusto B. Leguía y Salcedo	The Peruvian legation was raised to an Embassy on March 6, 1919.
Francisco Tudela y Varela		March 6, 1919		July 7, 1919	Augusto B. Leguía y Salcedo	As ambassador. Apparently never received by the President.
Carlos Gibson		July 7, 1919		January 2, 1920	Augusto B. Leguía y Salcedo	Chargé d'affaires. Second Vice President of Peru (1939–45).
Federico Alfonso Pezet Eastted		January 2, 1920	May 17, 1920	April 12, 1923	Augusto B. Leguía y Salcedo	(1859–1929) Descendant of Juan Antonio Pezet.
Alfredo González Prada		April 12, 1923		March 24, 1924	Augusto B. Leguía y Salcedo	
Hernán Velarde		March 24, 1924		July 24, 1930	Augusto B. Leguía y Salcedo	
Manuel de Freyre y Santander		July 24, 1930		April 1, 1944	Manuel María Ponce Brousset	Died in office.
Eduardo Garland		April 1, 1944		June 28, 1944	Manuel Prado y Ugarteche	Chargé d'affaires.
Pedro Beltrán Espantoso		June 28, 1944	July 12, 1944	November 30, 1945	Manuel Prado y Ugarteche	
Humberto Fernández-Dávila y Segovia		November 30, 1945		September 3, 1946	José Luis Bustamante y Rivero	Chargé d'affaires.
Jorge Prado Ugarteche		September 3, 1946	September 10, 1946	July 23, 1947	José Luis Bustamante y Rivero	
Humberto Fernández-Dávila y Segovia		July 23, 1947		January 27, 1948	José Luis Bustamante y Rivero	
Alfredo Ferreyros Ayulo		January 27, 1948	February 10, 1948	November 21, 1948	Manuel A. Odría	
Humberto Fernández-Dávila y Segovia		November 21, 1948		January 17, 1949	Manuel A. Odría	Chargé d'affaires.
Fernando Berckemeyer Pazos		January 17, 1949	January 18, 1949	January 27, 1964	Manuel A. Odría	
Celso Pastor de La Torre		January 27, 1964	February 11, 1964	December 3, 1968	Nicolás Lindley López	Fernando Belaúnde's brother-in-law.
Fernando Berckemeyer Pazos		December 3, 1968	January 3, 1969	February 28, 1975	Juan Velasco Alvarado	Chargé d'affaires. First diplomat under the Revolutionary Government.
Alfredo Ramos		February 28, 1975		March 19, 1975	Francisco Morales Bermúdez	Retired Vice Admiral of the Peruvian Navy.
José Arce Larco		March 19, 1975	April 29, 1975	February 4, 1976	Francisco Morales Bermúdez	
Carlos García-Bedoya Zapata		February 4, 1976	February 9, 1976	March 27, 1979	Francisco Morales Bermúdez	
Alfonso Arias Schreiber		March 27, 1979	March 30, 1979	December 8, 1980	Francisco Morales Bermúdez	
Fernando Schwalb		December 8, 1980	December 11, 1980	December 26, 1982	Francisco Morales Bermúdez	Last ambassador under the Revolutionary Government.
Alfonso Rivero Monsalve		December 26, 1982		June 3, 1983	Fernando Belaúnde Terry	Chargé d'affaires.
Celso Pastor de La Torre		June 3, 1983	June 18, 1984	June 1, 1984	Fernando Belaúnde Terry	
Luis Marchand Stens		June 1, 1984	June 18, 1984	January 8, 1986	Fernando Belaúnde Terry	
César Guillermo Atala Nazzal		January 8, 1986	March 11, 1986	March 6, 1991	Alan García	Removed from office by the Peruvian Government in protest of the United States invasion of Panama.
Roberto Guillermo MacLean Ugarteche		March 6, 1991	April 11, 1991	December 4, 1992	Alberto Fujimori	
Ricardo Luna Mendoza		December 4, 1992	April 14, 1993	August 9, 1999	Alberto Fujimori	
Alfonso Rivero Monsalve		August 9, 1999	August 10, 1999	February 2, 2001	Alberto Fujimori	
Carlos Alzamora Traverso		February 2, 2001	February 14, 2001	October 24, 2001	Alejandro Toledo	
Allan Wagner Tizón		October 24, 2001	November 8, 2001	November 29, 2002	Alejandro Toledo	
Roberto Dañino		November 29, 2002	December 9, 2002	March 26, 2004	Alejandro Toledo	
Eduardo Ferrero Costa		March 26, 2004	March 31, 2004	September 11, 2006	Alejandro Toledo	
Felipe Ortiz de Zevallos		September 11, 2006	September 12, 2006	April 3, 2009	Alan García	
Luis Valdivieso Montano		April 3, 2009	May 20, 2009	August 29, 2011	Alan García	
Harold Forsyth		August 3, 2011	September 9, 2011	January 6, 2015	Ollanta Humala	
Luis Miguel Castilla		January 6, 2015	February 23, 2015	July 2016	Pedro Pablo Kuczynski	
Carlos Jose Pareja Rios		September 8, 2016	December 31, 2018	November 13, 2020	Pedro Pablo Kuczynski	
Hugo de Zela		November 13, 2020	August 13, 2021	October 13, 2021	Manuel Merino	
Oswaldo de Rivero		October 13, 2021	December 7, 2022	December 7, 2022	Pedro Castillo	
Gustavo Meza-Cuadra Velásquez		February 23, 2023	October 10, 2025	October 10, 2025	Dina Boluarte	

== See also ==
- List of ambassadors of the United States to Peru
