= Peru–Switzerland relations =

Diplomatic relations between Peru and Switzerland

- Peru: Switzerland

Diplomatic mission
- Embassy of Peru, Bern: Embassy of Switzerland, Lima

Peru and Switzerland established consular relations in 1876 and made them official in 1884; relations have been maintained since. A Swiss consulate opened in Lima in 1884, being transformed into a consulate general in 1931, before being elevated to the rank of legation in 1946 and embassy in 1957. During World War II, Switzerland represented Peruvian interests in Germany, Italy and France, at the same time representing those of the latter in Peru.

== History ==
The first Swiss arrived in Peru in the mid-19th century. One notable example was naturalist Johann Jakob von Tschudi, who co-wrote Antigüedades peruanas with the Peruvian scientist Mariano Eduardo de Rivero y Ustáriz, a study of Peruvian life and history published in Vienna in 1851 and translated into English two years later. During his travels, he also carried out craniometric measurements of Peruvian skulls using the angles of Camper.

Another influential individual was Italian Swiss businessman and philanthropist Severino Marcionelli (Bironico, 1869 – Lima, 1957), who emigrated from Ticino to Peru in 1890. Marcionelli was a mining entrepreneur who owned mines in southern Peru, had previously participated in the construction of the high-altitude Galera railway tunnel in Ticlio, and had also ventured into the country's agricultural sector. He also helped establish and was an important member of local organizations, such as the Club de la Unión or the Peruvian chapter of Pro Ticino, a diaspora organization for Ticinese Swiss in Peru, becoming an important member of the diaspora.

Marcionelli, alongside his business partner, José Di Luka Hanza Pericevic, originally from Cannosa, Dalmatia, purchased a terrain in the historic centre of Lima, near San Martín Plaza. A building named after him was built in the site in the 1920s, originally houseing Marcionelli's mining company's offices. Marcionelli himself served as honorary consul as the building also began to house the Consulate general of Switzerland in Lima until the late 1940s, when the consulate was elevated to a legation. The current location of the Swiss embassy in Lima also belonged to him. The 3-story building was ultimately destroyed in 2023 by a fire during a series of protests in its immediate surroundings.

In 1993, Switzerland annulled Peru's foreign debt.

A Swiss–Peruvian clinic started its operations on September 3, 2007.

In 2013, the 120th anniversary of the establishment of relations was celebrated, as well as in 2014.

== Trade ==
Switzerland founded a chamber of commerce in Peru on September 24, 1979, which has approximately 170 associates between companies and individuals.

== High-level visits ==
High-level visits from Peru to Switzerland

- Minister Antonio Brack Egg (2009)
- Foreign Minister José Antonio García Belaúnde (2009)
- Minister Luis Alberto Peirano (2012)
- President Ollanta Humala (2012)
- Prime Minister Juan Jiménez (2012)

High-level visits from Switzerland to Peru

- Minister Micheline Calmy-Rey (2005)
- Councillor Pascal Couchepin (2009)
- Secretary Jean-Daniel Gerber (2010)
- Vice President Didier Burkhalter (2013)

== Diaspora ==
The number of Swiss citizens in Peru in 2008 being numbered at 2,500 people, mostly in Lima. The Swiss community in Peru has established several organizations, such as a club and a clinic, as well as a chamber of commerce.

== Resident diplomatic missions ==
- Peru has an embassy in Bern.
- Switzerland has an embassy in Lima.

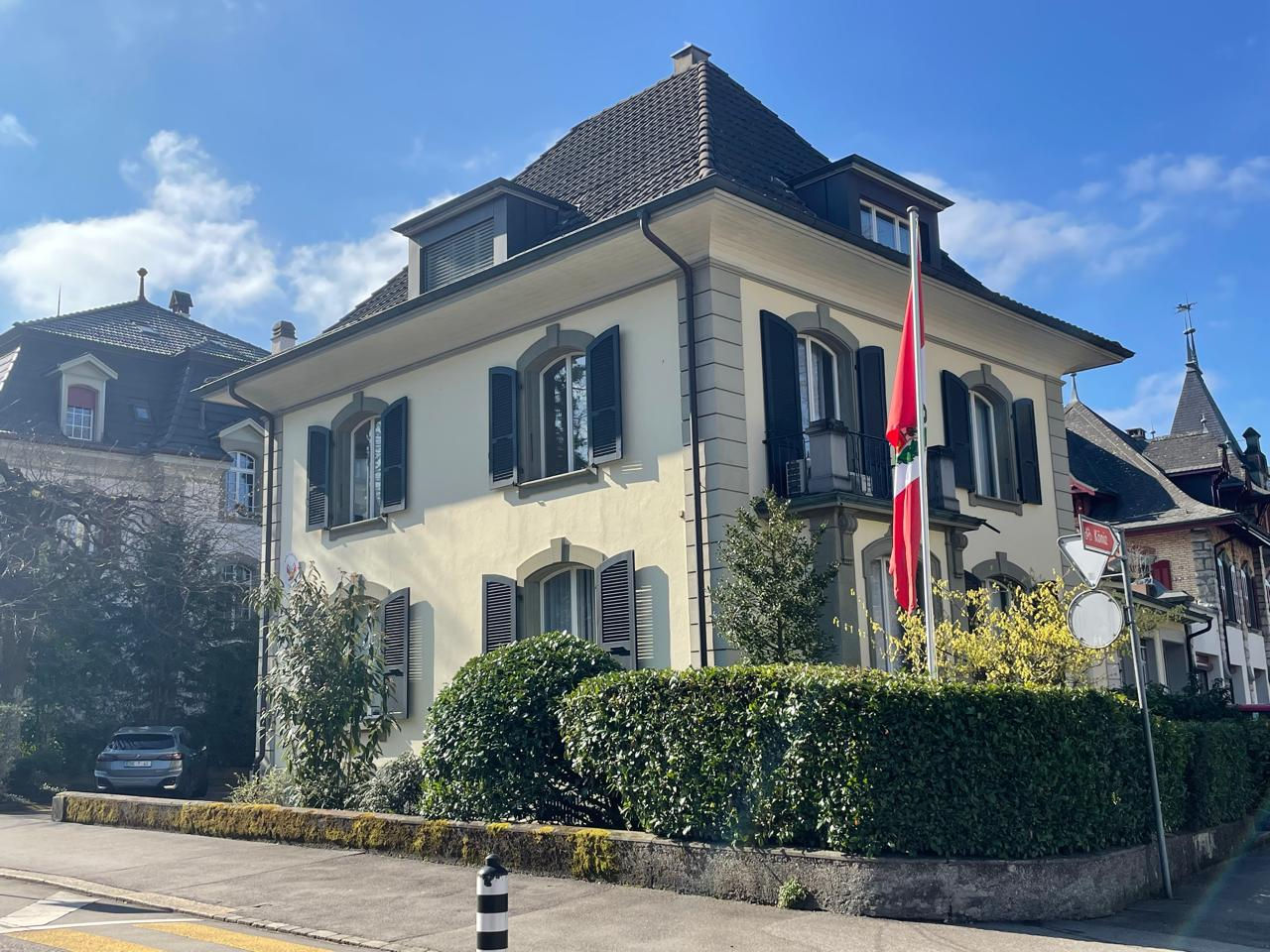
Embassy of Peru in Bern

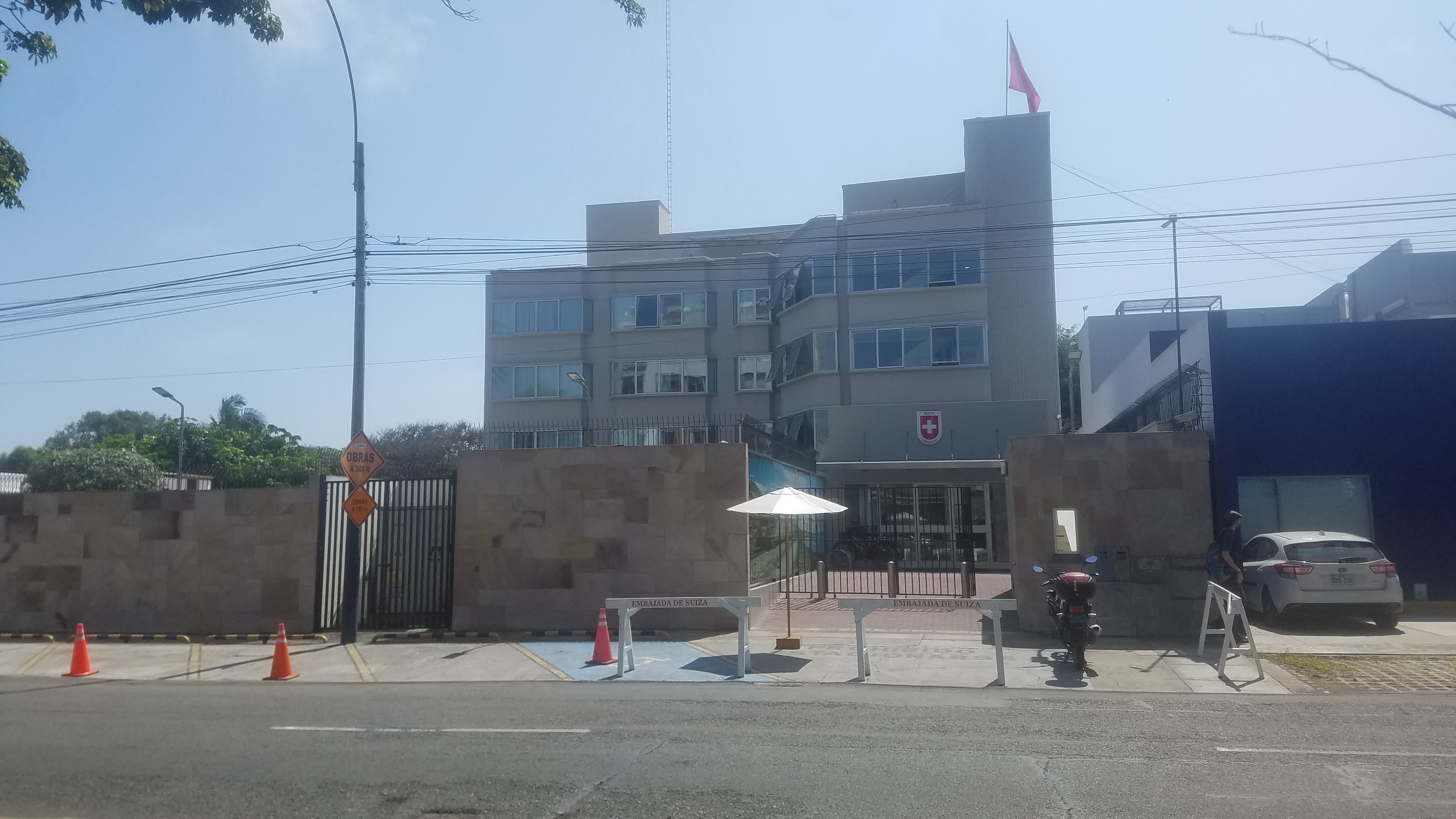
Embassy of Switzerland in Lima

== See also ==
- Foreign relations of Peru
- Foreign relations of Switzerland
- List of ambassadors of Peru to Switzerland
- List of ambassadors of Switzerland to Peru
