= 2002 Lima bombing =

Attack on U.S. embassy in Lima, Peru

- Part of the Internal conflict in Peru
- CCTV footage of the attack
- Location: Santiago de Surco, Lima, Peru
- Date: March 20, 2002; 10:45 pm
- Target: United States embassy (suspected)
- Attack type: Bombing
- Weapon: Car bomb
- Deaths: 9
- Injuries: 32
- Perpetrator: Unknown

The 2002 Lima bombing was a car bomb attack in Lima, Peru that occurred at El Polo Shopping Centre, just outside the embassy of the United States, killing nine people and injuring thirty-two. The blast came just three days prior to a visit to Peru from the United States President George W. Bush. No Americans were caught in the explosion. An estimated 30 kilograms (66 lb) of explosives was used in the attack.

== Attack ==
The bomb was planted at a mall four blocks from the American embassy. A seven-floor hotel and a branch of the Banco de Crédito del Perú bank were damaged, but the embassy compound itself, sitting behind a 20 ft high wall and distant from the street, received no apparent damage. Nine people died in the attack, including two embassy security guards and one police officer. They were later identified as follows:

- Iván Marilúz Jiménez
- José Luis Gallegos Chávez
- Augusto Banda Serra
- Rafael Ernesto Barzola Vera
- Saúl Díaz Herrera, sub-officer of the National Police of Peru
- Augusto Gil Figueroa
- Carlos Rodríguez Ponce
- Juan Carlos Gamarra Orellana
- Zenón Enríquez Vargas

Peruvian President Alejandro Toledo said he will "not permit democracy to be undermined by terrorist attacks." The interior minister claimed that the attack would not stop Bush's scheduled visit to Lima to meet with Toledo and the leaders of Colombia, Bolivia and Ecuador. A statement from the U.S. embassy said "We condemn the barbaric terrorist bombing this evening in the vicinity of our embassy in Lima." Minutes before leaving for Peru, Bush apparently said "You bet I'm going."

== Responsibility ==
The United States suspected that guerillas from the left-wing Shining Path organization perpetrated the attack. International terrorist groups including Al-Qaeda were also suspected. Despite the main suspicion lying on Shining Path, the group never claimed responsibility, nor did the Túpac Amaru Revolutionary Movement (MRTA) and the Revolutionary Armed Forces of Colombia (FARC), another active left-wing groups during the period. An analyst claimed the attack may have been motivated against Bush's war on terror.

The MRTA previously bombed the United States embassy in Lima on January 15, 1990. It was bombed again on July 27, 1993, this time by Shining Path. Four people were wounded in this attack.

== See also ==
- 2001 Peru shootdown
