= Embassy of Peru, Washington, D.C. =

Diplomatic mission of Peru to the United States

Emily J. Wilkins House (Embassy of Peru in Washington, D.C.)
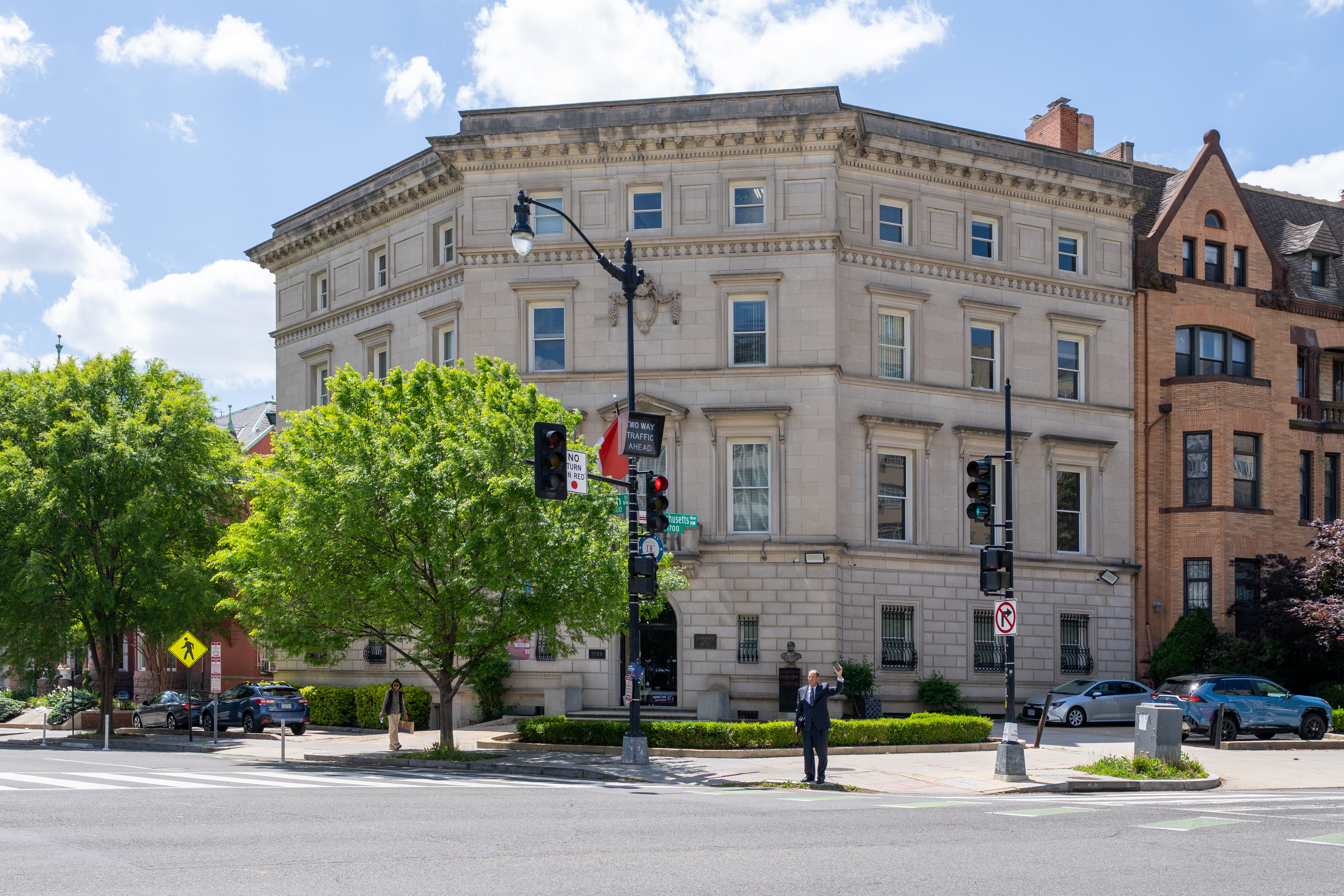
- Location: Washington, D.C., U.S.
- Address: 1700 Massachusetts Avenue, N.W.
- Coordinates: 38°54′27″N 77°2′19″W
- Ambassador: Alfredo Ferrero
- Website: Official website

The Embassy of Peru in the United States is the diplomatic mission of the Republic of Peru to the United States. It is housed at Emily J. Wilkins House, located at 1700 Massachusetts Avenue, Northwest, Washington, D.C., in the Embassy Row neighborhood.

The current ambassador of Peru to the United States is Alfredo Ferrero Diez-Canseco.

== History ==
The building was designed by Jules Henri de Sibour for Emily J. Wilkins, widow of Beriah Wilkins. Their son John F. Wilkins, who married Julia C. Wilkins, inherited the property in 1910. In 1946, Australia purchased the property, occupying it from 1947 to 1969.

On January 31, 1973, Australia sold the property to the Republic of Peru.

=== Complementary missions ===
In addition to the embassy, Peru operates a permanent mission to the United Nations, located at 820 2nd Ave, Suite 1600, in New York City.

It also operates 16 consulates-general in Atlanta, Boston, Chicago, Dallas, Denver, Hartford, Houston, Los Angeles, Miami, New York City, Orlando, Paterson, Phoenix, Salt Lake City, San Francisco, and Washington, D.C.

=== Residence ===
The Residence of the Ambassador is Battery Terrill, a Colonial Revival-styled mansion and 25-acre estate of wooded land adjoining Rock Creek Park located in Northwest Washington, D.C.

On April 20, 2022, a shooting broke out at the residence after a man broke into the estate, being fatally shot by the United States Secret Service in response.

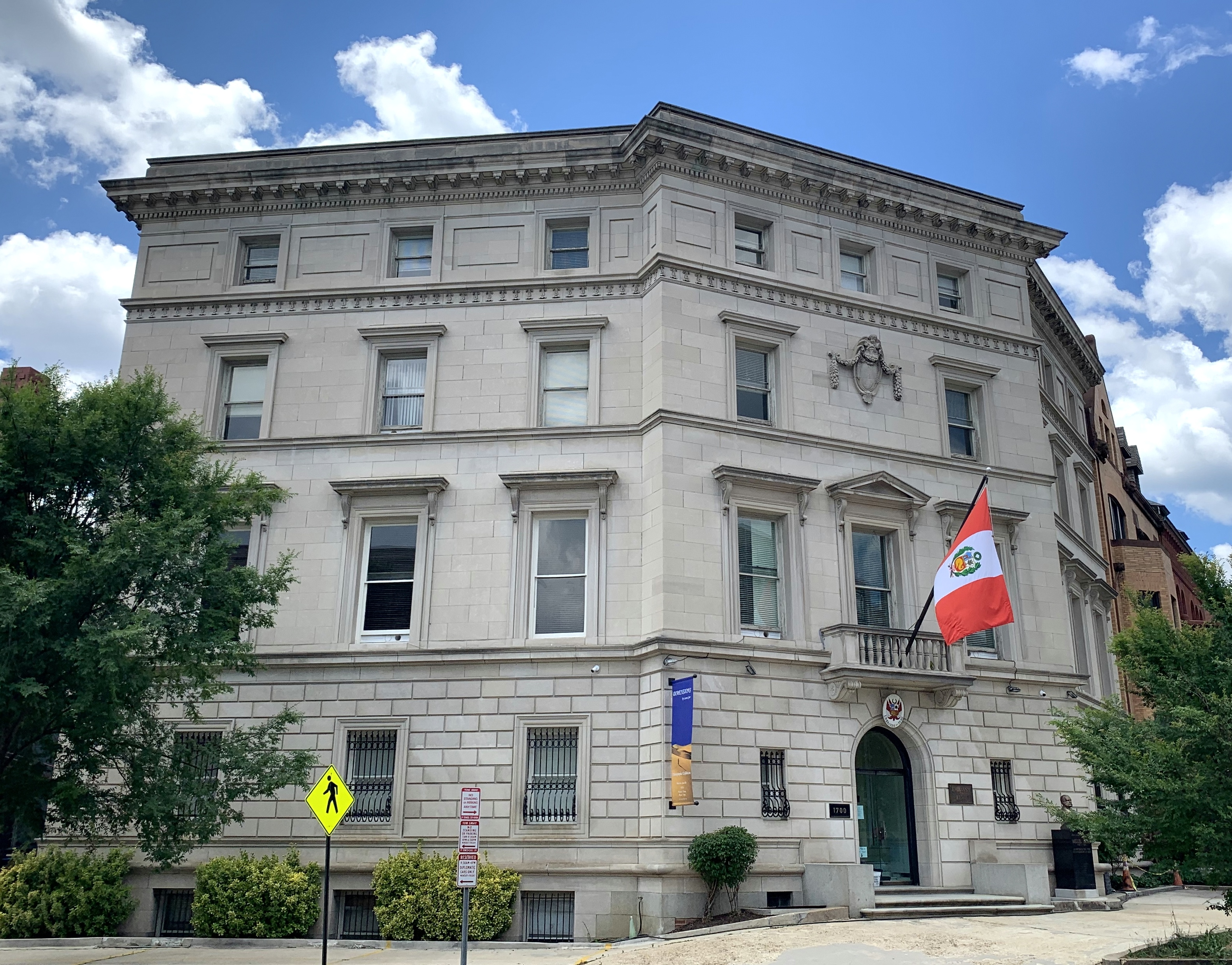
Embassy of Peru in Washington, D.C.

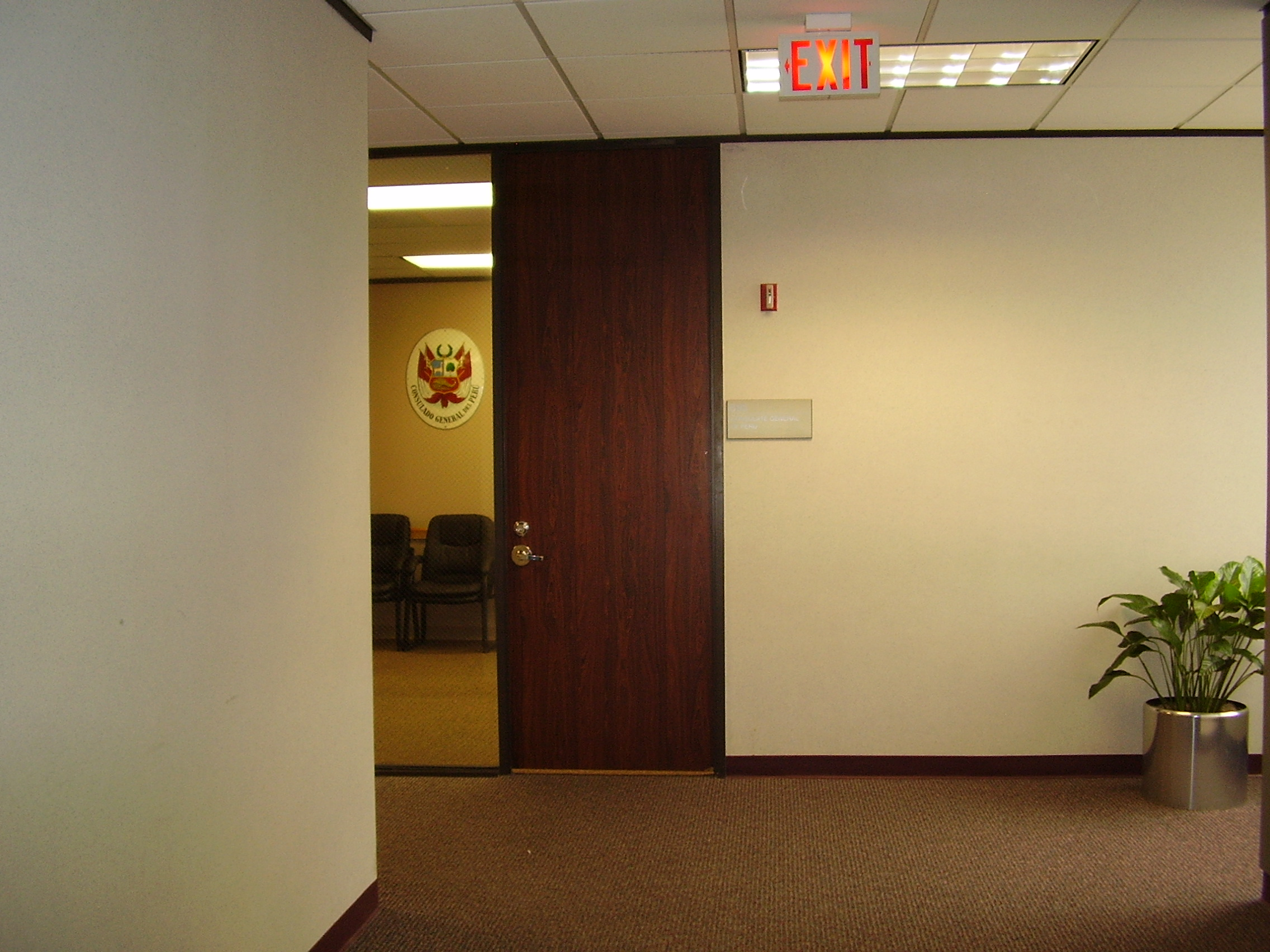
Consulate-General in Houston

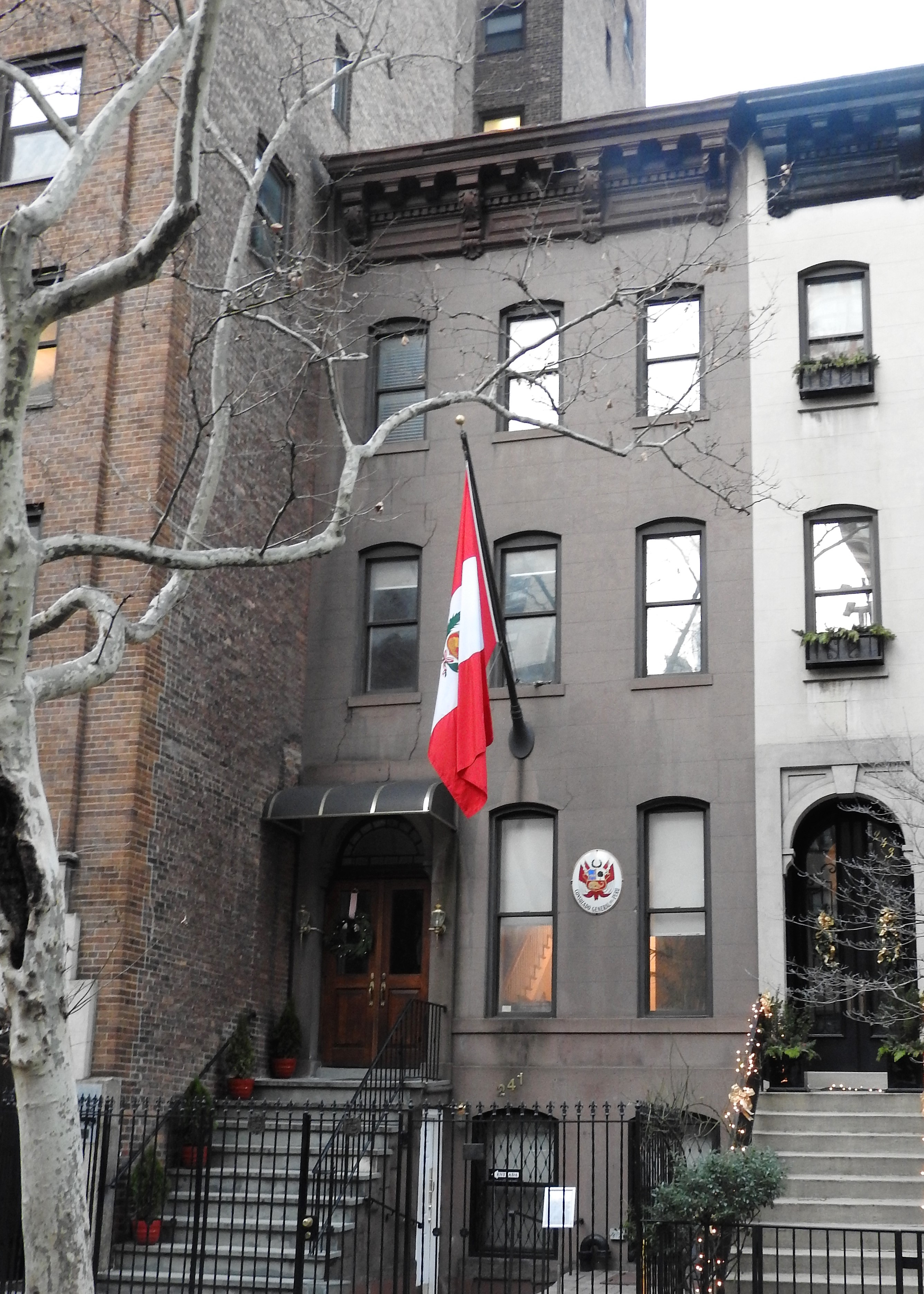
Consulate-General in New York

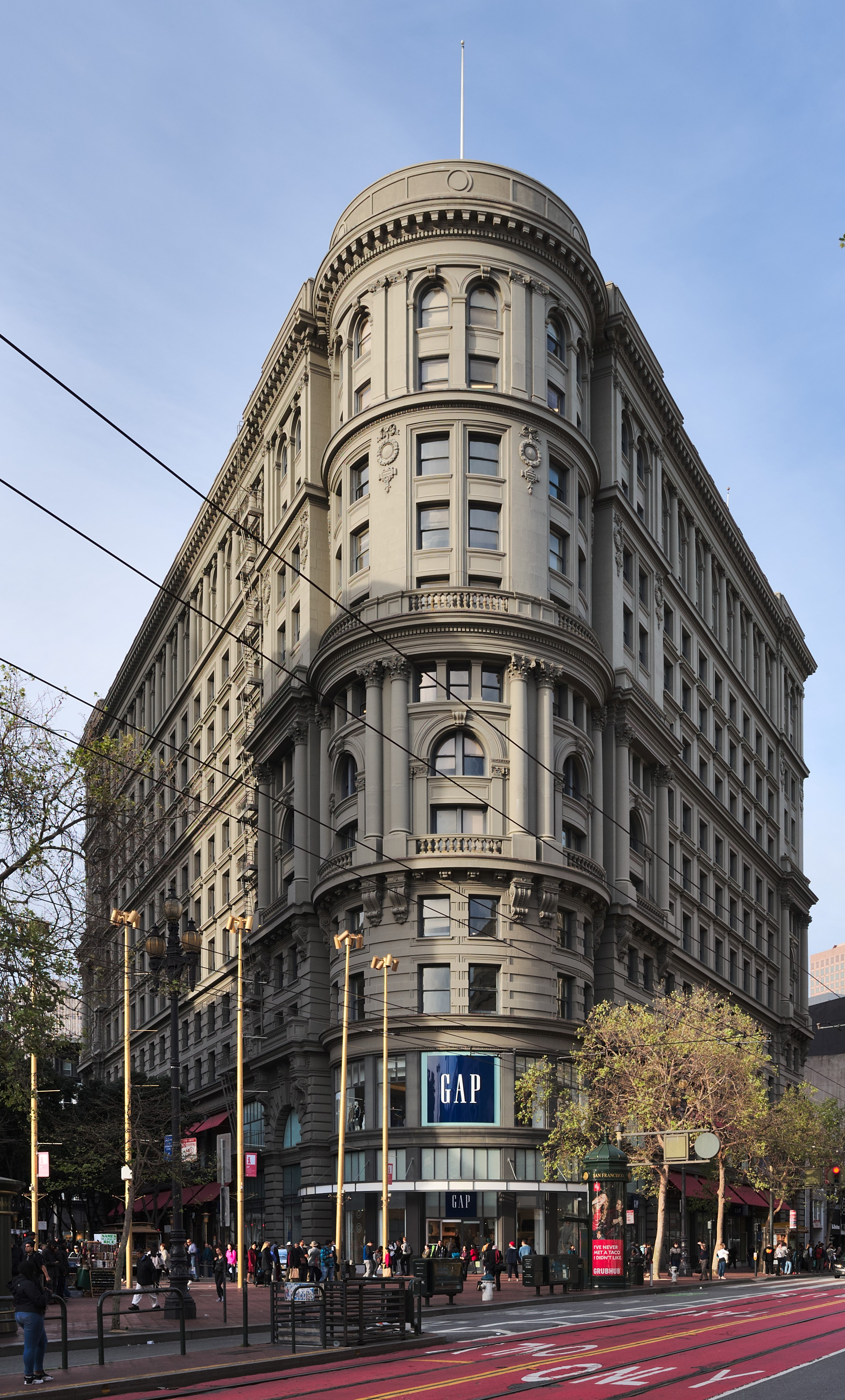
Building hosting the Consulate-General in San Francisco

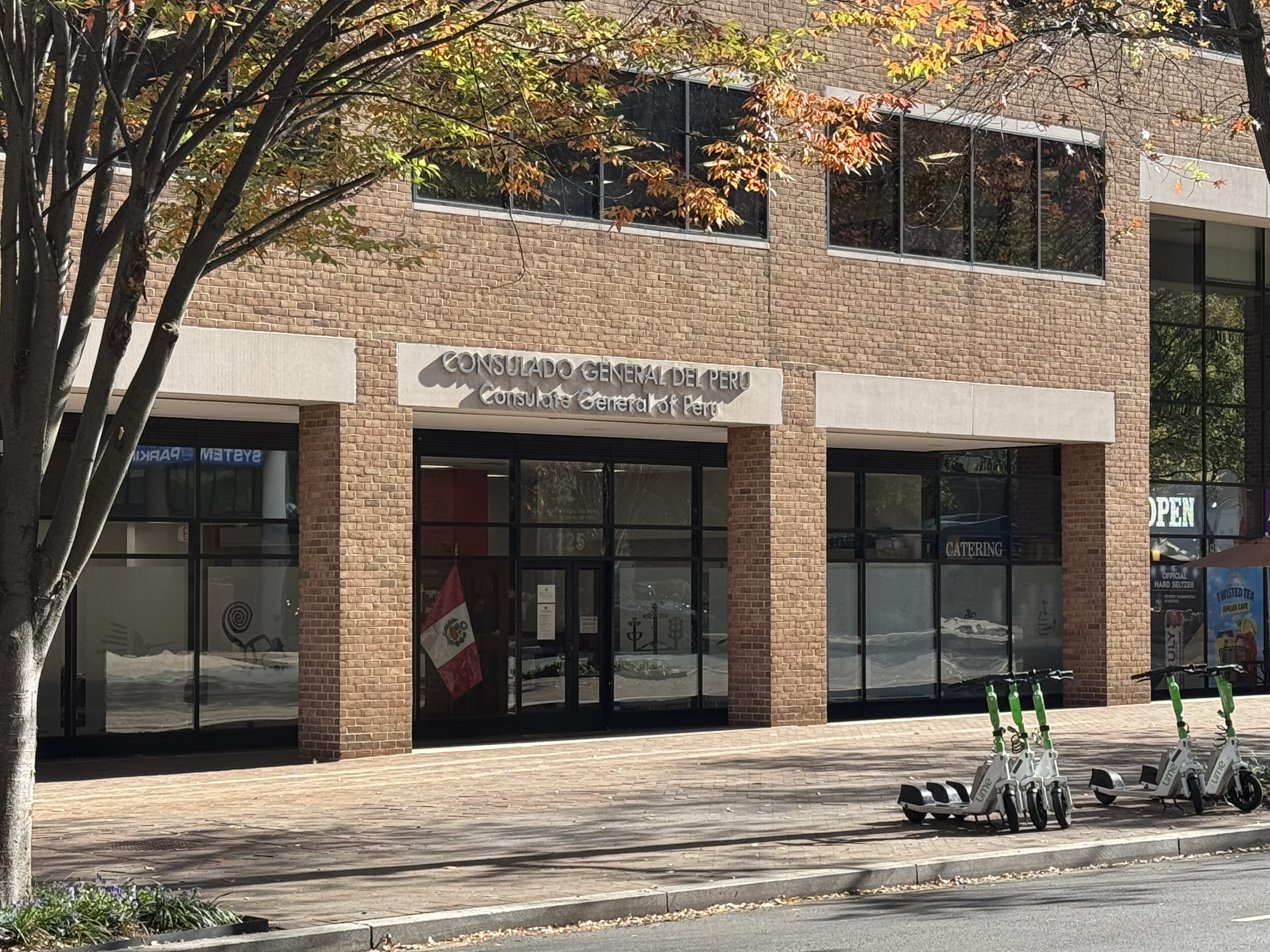
Consulate-General in Washington, D.C.

== See also ==
- Embassy of the United States, Lima
- Peru–United States relations
