= British Peruvians =

Peruvians of British descent

Regions with significant populations
- Callao · Lima · Trujillo · Arequipa · Moyobamba

Languages
- Spanish · English

Religion
- Protestantism · Roman Catholicism · Others

British Peruvians are Peruvians of British descent. The phrase may refer to someone born in Peru of British descent. Among European Peruvians, the British were the fifth largest group of immigrants to settle in the country after the Spanish, Germans, Italians, the Swiss or/and the French.

== Cuisine ==
Inca Kola was invented by an English immigrant. In 1911, in Rímac, one of Lima's oldest and most traditional neighborhoods, an immigrant English family began a small bottling company under their family name, Lindley. In 1928, the company was formally chartered in Peru as Corporación José R. Lindley S.A., whereupon Joseph R. Lindley became its first General Manager.

== Sport ==
Football is the most popular sport in Peru. Football in Peru was introduced by British immigrants, Peruvians returning from Great Britain, and by English sailors in the later half of the 19th century during their frequent stops at the port of Callao, which at that point was considered one of the most important ports of the Pacific Ocean.

Lima is home to an important sporting institution, it was founded in 1845 by English immigrants as Salon de Comercio, renamed in 1859 as the Lima Cricket Club, and was based around the sports of cricket, rugby, and football, the club underwent many other name changes such as in 1865 to Lima Cricket and Lawn Tennis Club and in 1906 to Lima Cricket and Football Club.

== Notable people ==
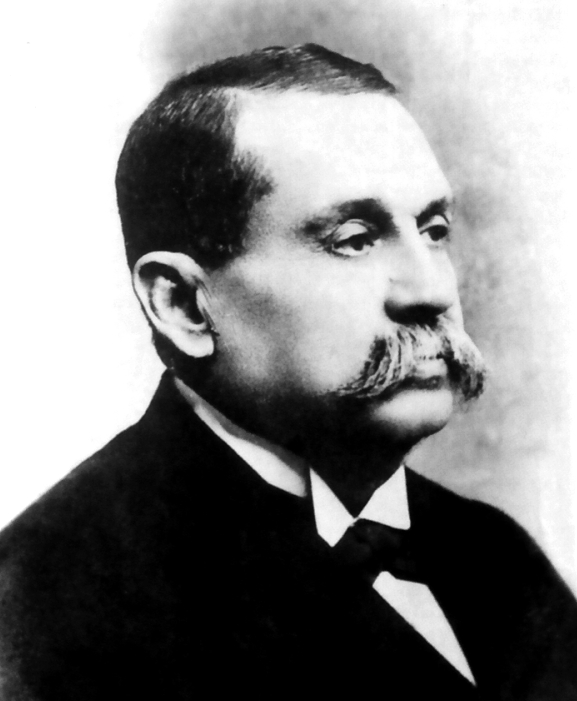
Guillermo Billinghurst

- Guillermo Billinghurst, 31st President of Peru
- Nicolás Lindley López, 56th President of Peru
- Alberto Elmore Fernández de Córdoba, former Prime Minister of Peru
- Guillermo Larco Cox, former Prime Minister of Peru
- Jaime Thorne León, former Minister of Defense of Peru
- Guillermo Miller, Grand Marshal of Peru and independence-era military leader
- José Williams, former Peruvian general
- Ricardo Letts Colmenares, Peruvian politician
- Cayetana Aljovín, Peruvian politician
- Henry Pease, Peruvian politician
- Juan Guillermo More, Peruvian navy officer
- Isaac Lindley, Peruvian businessman
- Manuel Delgado Parker, Peruvian entrepreneur
- Enrique Zileri Gibson, Peruvian publisher
- Carlos Fitzcarrald, Peruvian rubber baron
- Juan Luis Cipriani Thorne, Cardinal Priest and Archbishop of Lima
- Juan Landázuri Ricketts, Cardinal Priest and Archbishop of Lima
- Rafael Larco Hoyle, Peruvian archaeologist
- Ruth Shady, Peruvian archaeologist
- Luis Miró Quesada Garland, Peruvian architect and professor
- Alfredo Bryce, Peruvian writer
- Jaime Bayly, Peruvian writer, journalist and television personality
- Doris Gibson, Peruvian magazine writer and publisher
- Jason Day, Peruvian actor
- Diego Bertie, Peruvian actor
- Johanna San Miguel, Peruvian actress
- Prissila Howard, Peruvian model and TV hostess
- Mónica Santa María, Peruvian model and TV hostess
- Madeleine Hartog-Bel, Peruvian model and 1967 Miss World winner
- Leslie Shaw, Peruvian singer
- Ramón Mifflin, former Peruvian football player
- Diego Penny, Peruvian footballer
- George Forsyth, Peruvian footballer
- Pablo Gutiérrez Weselby – Peruvian politician and former mayor of Chorrillos
- Henry Ian Cusick, British-Peruvian actor

== British Peruvian institutions and associations ==
- Cámara de Comercio Peruano-Británica
- Newton College
- Colegio San Andrés
- Markham College
- San Silvestre School
- Colegio Anglo Americano Prescott
- Colegio Peruano-Británico
- Hiram Bingham School
- Asociación Cultural Peruano-Británica
- Clínica Anglo Americana
- Teatro Británico de Lima
- Asociación de descendientes Británicos en Perú
- Asociación Escocia-Perú
- Asociación Británico-Peruano
- Anglo-Peruvian Society
- Phoenix Club

== See also ==
- Peruvian Britons
- Peru-United Kingdom relations
- British diaspora
- British–Peruvian Cultural Association
