= Consulate General of Peru, Paris =

Peruvian consulate, Paris

Consulate General of Peru in Paris
- Location: Paris, France
- Address: 14 rue de Siam 75116
- Consul General: Carlos Briceño Salazar
- Website: consulado.pe/es/paris/Paginas/Inicio.aspx

The Consulate General of Peru in Paris (French: Consulat général du Pérou à Paris, Spanish: Consulado General del Perú en París) is one of two diplomatic representations of Peru in Paris, the other being the Peruvian embassy.

The current Consul General is Carlos Briceño Salazar

== History ==
France and Peru first established diplomatic relations in 1826. Peru has maintained a consular presence in France since 1841, opening consulates in Paris, as well as in Bordeaux, Le Havre, Nice, Cayenne, Strasbourg, Lyon, Marseille, Toulouse and formerly Algiers, in French Algeria since at least 1874.

During the German occupation of France, the German Chancellery notified the Peruvian legation on 12 June 1941, requesting that the embassy be closed and the personnel removed before 10 June. The Peruvian government agreed to this request and moved to the Hôtel des Ambassadeurs in Vichy, with only the consulate remaining. The German government again notified Peru afterwards, requesting that the consulate be closed before 1 September. This request was rejected by the Peruvian government, with Germany ultimately accepting that the consulate remain open. In November 1942, Peruvian and other Latin American diplomats were moved to Bad Godesberg by German forces, being exchanged in a prisoner swap with the United States and moved to Portugal or Switzerland, leading to the consulate in Paris closing, with Switzerland acting as Peru's protecting power instead.

In 1944, after Peru severed relations with the French State of Philippe Pétain and established relations with Free France, the Peruvian legation in France—now based in Algiers—became known as the Representation of Peru before the French Committee of National Liberation (Spanish: Representación del Perú ante el Comité Francés de Liberación Nacional). The Parisian consulate only reopened after the liberation of the city, with the Peruvian envoy arriving to the Hotel Bristol on 5 October 1944. Three days later, the Swiss consul, Rodolphe Iselin, gifted the new property of the Parisian consulate to his Peruvian counterpart, located at Av. Pierre Premier De Serbie Nº 37. On 21 November, Peru recognised the new Provisional Government.

== List of Consuls general ==
- Jorge Méndez Torres-Llosa (2013–2018)
- Vilma Liliam Ballón Sánchez (2018–2022)
- Carlos Herrera Rodríguez (2022–present)

== See also ==
- France–Peru relations

== Bibliography ==
- Novak, Fabián (2005). Las relaciones entre el Perú y Francia (1827–2004) (in Spanish). PUCP. ISBN 9972-42-721-8.
