= Embassy of Peru, Paris =

Embassy of Peru in France
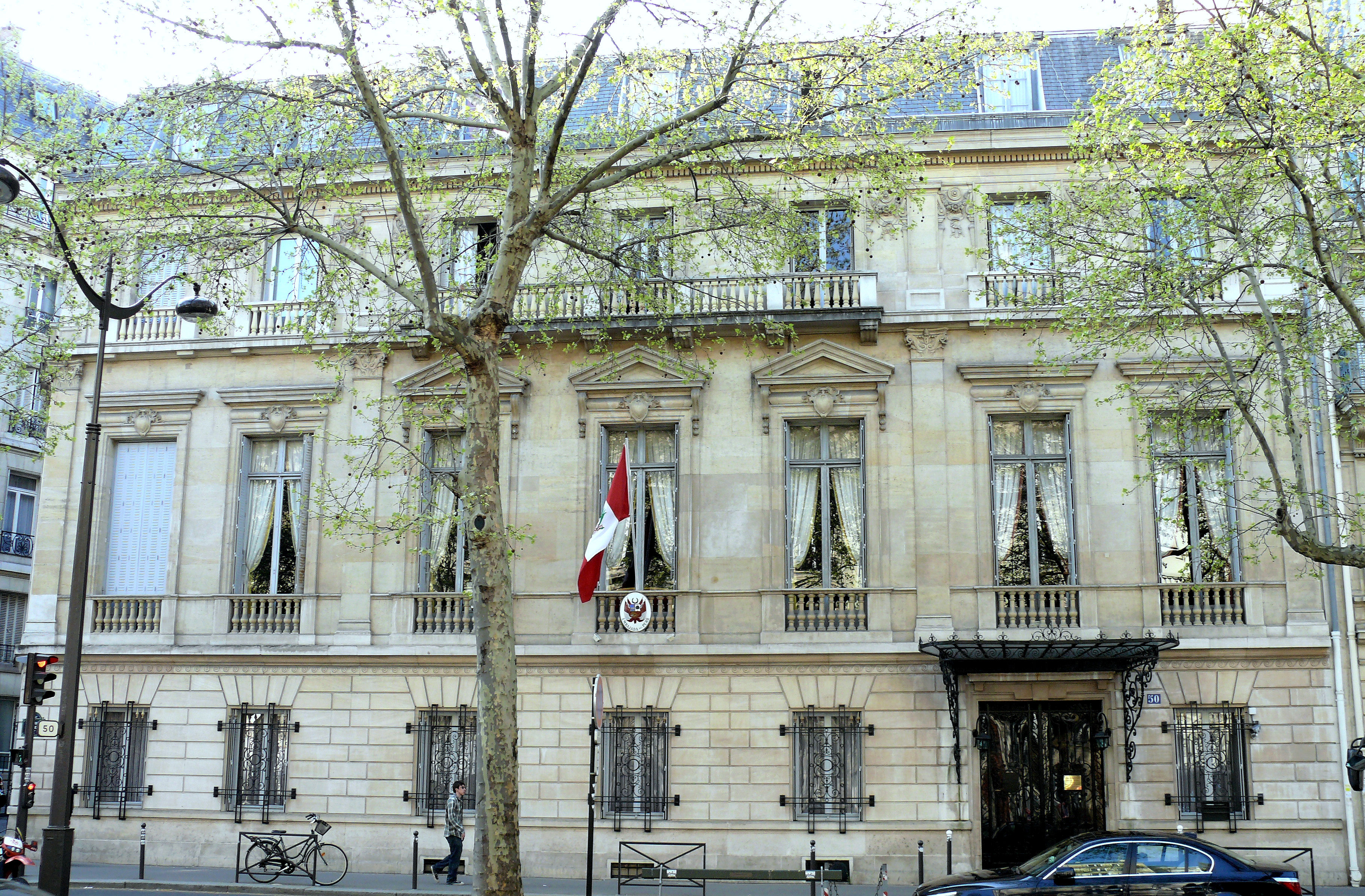
- Address: Av. Kléber 50, Paris
- Ambassador: Rolando Ruiz Rosas Cateriano
- Website: Official website

The Embassy of Peru in France (French: Ambassade du Pérou en France, Spanish: Embajada del Perú en Francia) is the foremost diplomatic mission of Peru in France.

The current Peruvian ambassador to France is Rolando Javier Ruiz Rosas Cateriano, also accredited to Monaco since July 11, 2022.

== History ==
Both countries established relations in 1826 and have maintained them since.

During the German occupation of France, the German Chancellery notified the Peruvian legation on June 12, 1941, requesting that the embassy be closed and the personnel removed before June 10. The Peruvian government agreed to this request and moved to the Hôtel des Ambassadeurs in Vichy, with only the consulate remaining. The German government again notified Peru afterwards, requesting that the consulate be closed before September 1. This request was rejected by the Peruvian government, with Germany ultimately accepting that the consulate remain open. In November 1942, Peruvian and other Latin American diplomats were moved to Bad Godesberg by German forces, being exchanged in a prisoner swap with the United States and moved to Portugal or Switzerland, leading to the consulate in Paris closing, with Switzerland acting as Peru's protecting power instead.

In 1944, after Peru severed relations with the French State of Philippe Pétain and established relations with Free France, the Peruvian legation in France—now based in Algiers—became known as the Representation of Peru before the French Committee of National Liberation (Spanish: Representación del Perú ante el Comité Francés de Liberación Nacional). The Parisian consulate only reopened after the liberation of the city, with the Peruvian envoy arriving to the Hotel Bristol on October 5, 1944. Three days later, the Swiss consul, Rodolphe Iselin, gifted the new property of the Parisian consulate to his Peruvian counterpart, located at Av. Pierre Premier De Serbie Nº 37. On 21 November, Peru recognised the new Provisional Government.

The embassy is housed in a hôtel particulier belonging to the Peruvian government since 1958. Known as Hôtel Lafont de la Vernède, it was built in 1880 by Julien Bayard for the Lafont de la Vernede family. In 1912, the hôtel was purchased by Rafael de Miero, ambassador of Uruguay to France, and was remodeled by Émile Hochereau. In 1916, Ambassador de Miero transferred the property to Peruvian diplomat Count Pablo Sixto de Mimbela, who used it as his personal residence until his death.

The hôtel was purchased by the Peruvian Government in 1957. It was partially listed as a historical monument by order of December 21, 2004.

== See also ==
- Embassy of France, Lima

== Bibliography ==
- Novak, Fabián (2005). Las relaciones entre el Perú y Francia (1827–2004) (in Spanish). PUCP. ISBN 9972-42-721-8.
