= Eme Eyzaguirre =

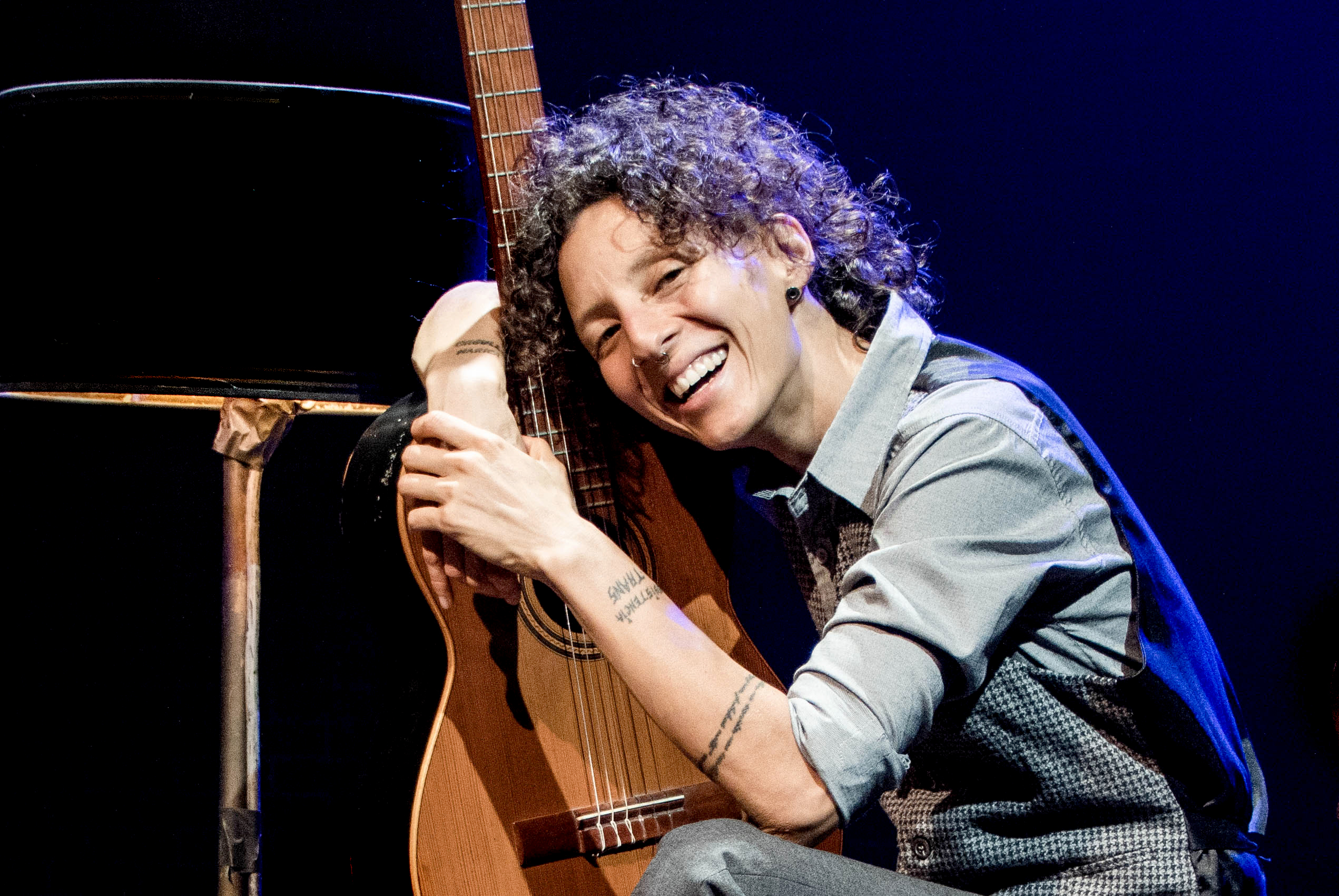

Background information
- Also known as: Eme
- Born: August 8, 1992 (age 33)
- Occupations: Artist and singer
- Instruments: Voice, guitar, upright bass
- Years active: 2016–present

Eme Eyzaguirre Eyzaguirre (born August 8, 1992) is a Peruvian non-binary musician whose work fuses Peruvian music with tonal experimentation and social criticism. Their work explores themes of identity, self-knowledge, memory, and resistance, transforming music into a medium of protest and reflection. They have participated in diverse artistic and cultural projects, both in Peru and elsewhere.

== Early and personal life ==
Eyzaguirre grew up in Lima in a family of musicians. They first came out as bisexual at age 13. As a teenager, they attempted to change their sexuality to fit with the expectations of their Catholic community.

Since age 16, Eyzaguirre has used music as a way to express their identity and experiences. They trained in Popular Song in the Department of Theatrical Arts at the Pontifical Catholic University of Peru in Lima. While at university, they decided to leave the Roman Catholic church.

As a visible figure in the LGBTQ community, Eyzaguirre aims to uses their music to bring attention to diverse experiences and narratives in Peruvian society. They describe their gender as non-binary, neither a man nor a woman. In a 2016 interview, Eme suggested that openly identifying as an LGBTQ person could have a negative impact on their public reception, but that it was most important for them to increase visibility with their work.

== Music career ==
Eyzaguirre has presented their work in cultural spaces and festivals, among them the Cultural Center of Spain in Lima and the Peruvian North American Cultural Institute (ICPNA), where they have formed part of exhibits and projects that link music with other artistic disciplines.

Some themes that they have covered in their musical career include social problems like gender-based violence and the fight for rights for marginalized communities. Their style combines traditional elements with tonal experimentation.

In 2021, Eyzaguirre was a part of the "Sobrevivir" project at the Peruvian North American Cultural Institute (ICPNA). They collaborated with trans artists Angellina Miladi (dancer and choreographer) and Almendra Pamela (musician and composer). Their collective exhibit presented art as a tool of resistance.

In 2023, they worked on "Aves Raras de Siempre," an audio and visual design that reflects on marginalization and diversity in voices of Peruvian music.

Their solo project "MedoAmor/MedioMiedo" was a 50-minute multimedia performance in São Paulo, Brazil. It included songs, spoken and written word, sound, and gesture.

== Discography ==
- Raíz/Es (2017)

== Exhibits and notable presentations ==
- "Aves Raras de Siempre" - Cultural Center of Spain in Lima
- "Sobrevivir" - Peruvian North American Cultural Institute
- "Medio Amor, Medio Miedo" - SESC São Paulo
