= Embassy of France, Lima =

Embassy of France in Peru
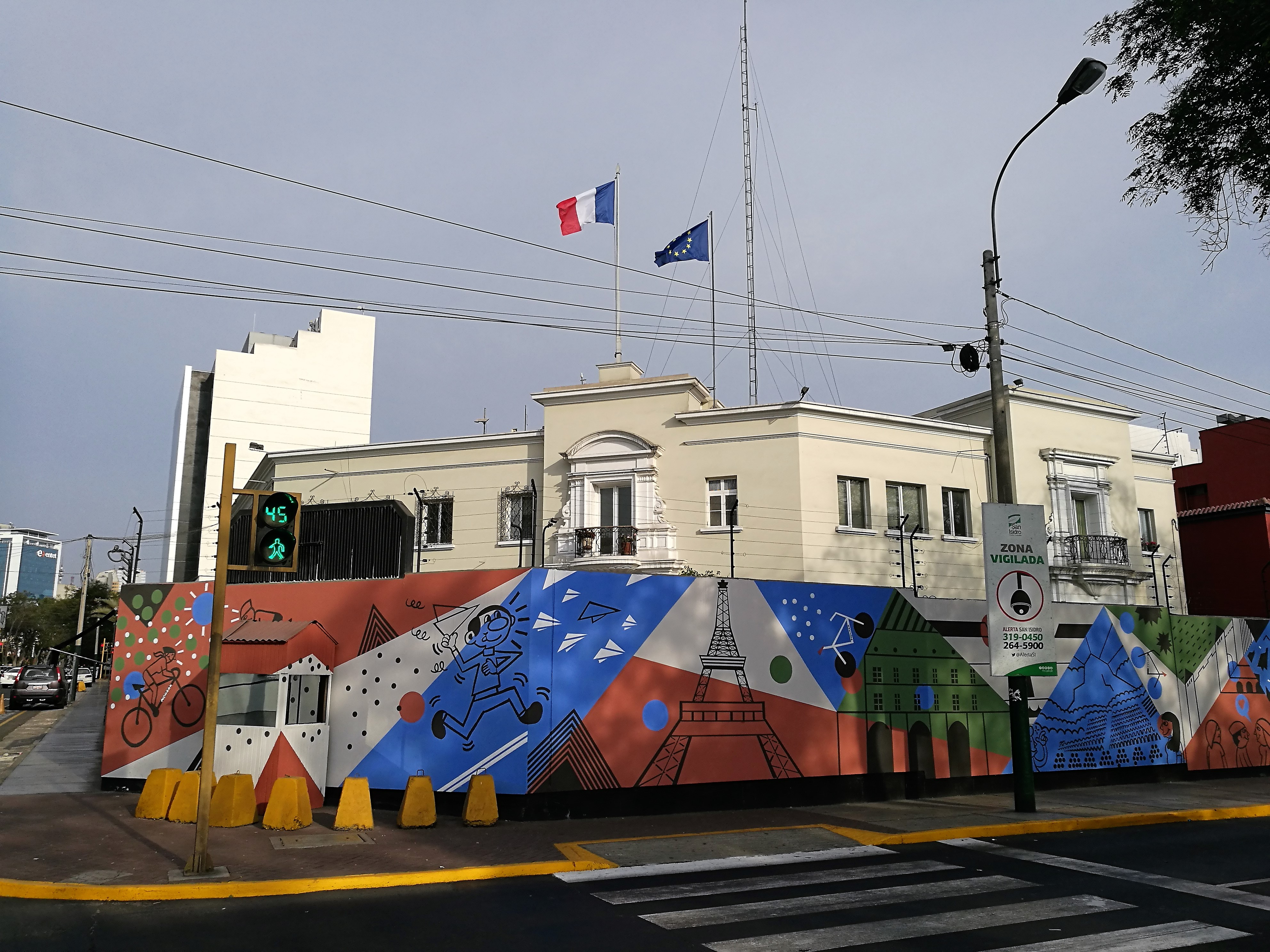
- Location: San Isidro, Lima, Peru
- Address: Av. Arequipa 3415
- Website: Official website

The Embassy of France in Peru (French: Ambassade de France au Pérou, Spanish: Embajada de Francia en Perú) represents the permanent diplomatic mission of France in Peru. It is located at 3415 Arequipa Avenue, in San Isidro District, Lima.

The current French ambassador to Peru is Marc Giacomini.

== History ==
Both countries in 1826 and have maintained them since. Relations were severed once during World War II with the French State of Philippe Pétain, with Peru instead establishing relations with Free France and normalizing its relations with said government after the war, elevating the relations to embassy level.

For the first half of the 20th century, the French legation was located at the Quinta Heeren.

In 1973, Peru again severed diplomatic relations with France in protest of French nuclear testing in the South Pacific Ocean. The rupture lasted until 1975.

In December 1996, Hyacinthe D'Montera, the embassy's cultural attaché, became one of the hundreds of initial hostages during the Japanese embassy hostage crisis.

=== Residence ===
The official residence of the ambassador is a manor located at 302 General Portillo, also in San Isidro.

== List of representatives ==
Name	Portrait	Term begin	Term end	Head of state	Notes
Jean-Pierre Rattier de Sauvignan		1823	1826	Louis XVIII	
Jean-Baptiste-Gabriel-Amédée Chaumetters des Fossés		1826	1826	Louis XVIII	Inspector General of Trade with France.
Bernard-Marie Barrère		June 28, 1829	1835	Louis Philippe I	Consul General/Charges d'Affaires. Relations severed in 1835 by Prime Minister Manuel Bartolomé Ferreyros.
Armand Saillard		1840		Louis Philippe I	
Charles-François-Frédéric, marquis de Montholon-Sémonville		July 30, 1853		Napoleon III	Consul General and Charges d'Affaires.
Benoît Ulysse de Ratti-Menton		December 10, 1853		Napoleon III	
Albert Huet		September 3, 1854		Napoleon III	Chargé d'affaires.
Edmond-Prosper de Lesseps		July 20, 1859		Napoleon III	Cousin of Ferdinand de Lesseps and personal friend of Ramón Castilla.
Paul Chevery-Rameau		August 11, 1868		Napoleon III	Chargé d'affaires.
Mr. de Saint-Quentin		October 19, 1868		Napoleon III	
Charles-Henri-Philippe Gauldrée-Boilleau		1870		Napoleon III	
François de Ripert-Monclar		1870		Napoleon III	Chargé d'affaires.
De Bellonct		August 26, 1872		Patrice de MacMahon	
Augustin-Maurice Marchant de Vernouillet		October 23, 1872		Patrice de MacMahon	
Domet de Vorges		June 2, 1875		Patrice de MacMahon	
Comte de Balny		1875		Patrice de MacMahon	Chargé d'affaires.
Edmond Charles Eugène Domet de Vorges		1879	1881	Jules Grévy	
Comte Artus de Pina de Saint-Didier		1887	1890	Sadi Carnot	
Antoine Imbert		1891		Sadi Carnot	Minister Plenipotentiary, proposed 1891 arbitration negotiations on the Contrato Dreyfus.
Raoul Wagner		1895	1896	Félix Faure	
Auguste-Felix-Charles de Beaupoil		1896	1896	Félix Faure	
Paul-Augustin-Jean Larrouy		1900	1905	Émile Loubet	
Antony-Wladislas Klobukowski		1906		Armand Fallières	
Jean Guillemin		1910		Armand Fallières	
Gaston Albert Joseph Marie Moisson de Vaux Saint Cyr		1912	1912	Armand Fallières	
Henri des Portes de La Fosse		1914		Raymond Poincaré	
André Ribot		1924		Gaston Doumergue	
Maurice Dayet		1943	1945	Charles de Gaulle	
Albert Ledoux		1945	1949	Charles de Gaulle	
Pierre-Eugène Gilbert		1949	1952	Vincent Auriol	
Jean-André Binoche		1952	1955	Vincent Auriol	
Léon Brasseur		1955	1961	René Coty	
Jules Koenigswarter		1961	1966	Charles de Gaulle	
Guy Dorget		1966	1971	Charles de Gaulle	
Albert Chambon		1971	1973	Georges Pompidou	
Relations severed in 1973, restored in 1975
Paul Gaschignard		1975	1980	Valéry Giscard d'Estaing	
Jean-Max Bouchaud		1980	1983	Valéry Giscard d'Estaing	
Raymond Césaire		1983	1987	François Mitterrand	
Michel Rougagnou		1987	1989	François Mitterrand	
Jean-François Nougarède		1989	1992	François Mitterrand	
Camille Rohou		1992	1996	Jacques Chirac	
Bernard Prague		1996	1997	Jacques Chirac	
Antoine Blanca		1997	2001	Jacques Chirac	
Jean-Paul Angelier		2001	2005	Jacques Chirac	
Pierre Charrasse		2005	2008	Nicolas Sarkozy	
Cécile Pozzo di Borgo		2008	2011	Nicolas Sarkozy	
Jean-Jacques Beaussou		2011	2014	Nicolas Sarkozy	
Fabrice Mauries		2014	2017	François Hollande	
Antoine Grassin		2017	2020	Emmanuel Macron	
Marc Giacomini		2020	Incumbent	Emmanuel Macron	

== See also ==
- Embassy of Peru, Paris
- France–Peru relations
- List of ambassadors of Peru to France
