= Alliance Française de Lima =

French non-profit group in Lima, Peru

- Alianza Francesa de Lima
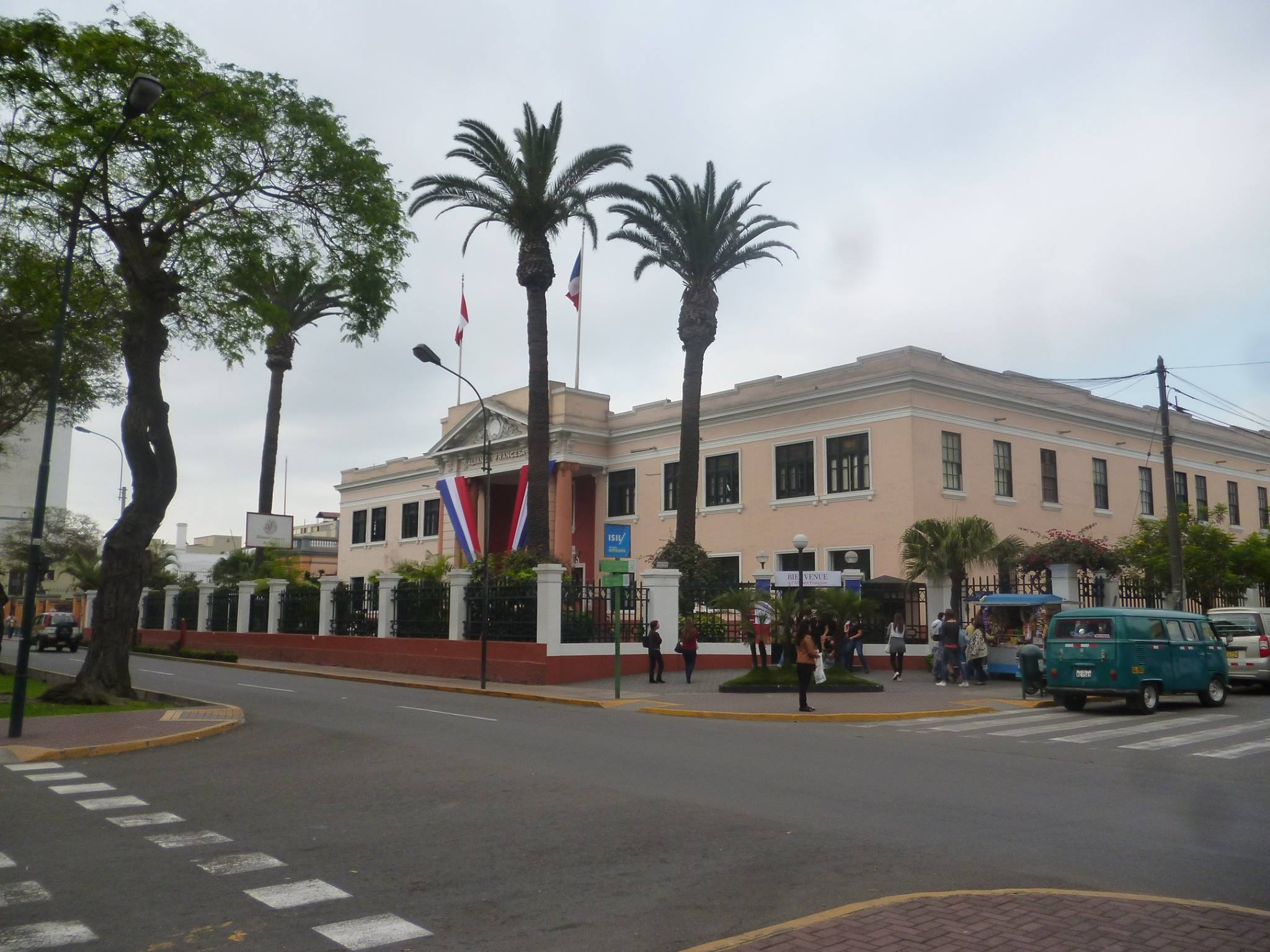
- Miraflores office at Arequipa Avenue
- Formation: February 12, 1890; 136 years ago
- Headquarters: Lima, Peru
- Website: www.aflima.org.pe

The Alliance Française de Lima is a non-profit, non governmental cultural and educational association in Peru. Its mission is to promote the French language and Francophone cultures in the country, as well as intercultural exchanges, within the context of the international network of the Alliance Française.

== History ==
The Alliance Française was founded on February 12, 1890, at the "Bomba Francia" premises. The group of French residents in Peru decided to form a committee and appointed Jean Dupeyrat as its first president. As the interest of the Peruvian population in learning the French culture and language increased, other locations of the institute were established in Cuzco (1948), Arequipa (1953), Chiclayo (1965), Piura (1965), Trujillo (1965), Iquitos (1990), among others. Over the years, the Alliance Française of Lima has maintained links and agreements with different educational institutions in Peru for the teaching of the French language.

The association's headquarters at 5200 Arequipa Avenue are located in a neoclassical manor that once served as the seat of Villa María School.

== Notable members ==
- Javier Heraud, poet
- Luis Hernández, poet and medic
- César Moro, poet and painter
- Georgette Vallejo, poet and writer
- Mario Vargas Llosa, writer

== See also ==
- French Peruvians
- France–Peru relations
- Lycée Franco-Péruvien
- British–Peruvian Cultural Association
- Peruvian North American Cultural Institute
