= List of ambassadors of Peru to France =

Ambassador of Peru to the French Republic
- Great Seal of Peru
- Ministry of Foreign Affairs; Av. Kléber 50, Paris
- Appointer: The president of Peru
- Inaugural holder: José Joaquín de Olmedo
- Formation: 1827
- Website: Embassy of Peru in France

The extraordinary and plenipotentiary ambassador of Peru to the French Republic is the official representative of the Republic of Peru to the French Republic. The ambassador to France is also accredited to the Principality of Monaco.

Both countries established relations in 1826 and have maintained them since. Relations were severed once during World War II with the French State of Philippe Pétain, with Peru instead establishing relations with Free France and normalizing its relations with said government after the war. In 1973, Peru again severed diplomatic relations with France in protest of French nuclear testing in the South Pacific Ocean. The rupture lasted until 1975.

== List of representatives ==
| Name | Portrait | Term begin | Term end | President | Notes |
|---|---|---|---|---|---|
| José Joaquín de Olmedo | | 1827 | 1828 | Andrés de Santa Cruz | Acted as a diplomatic agent for Peru to different European states. |
| Francisco de Rivero y Ustariz | | June 22, 1852 | April 5, 1856 | José Rufino Echenique | Chargé d'affairs and resident minister |
| Domingo Elías | | April 5, 1856 | 1857 | Ramón Castilla | Resident minister |
| Luis Mesones | | 1857 | 1858 | Ramón Castilla | Chargé d'affairs |
| Francisco de Rivero y Ustariz | | October 26, 1858 | 1859 | Ramón Castilla | Resident minister |
| José Antonio Barrenechea y Morales | | 1859 | 1860 | Ramón Castilla | Chargé d'affairs |
| Pedro Gálvez Egúsquiza | | September 27, 1860 | 1860 | Ramón Castilla | Resident minister |
| José María Costas | | June 4, 1862 | 1863 | Ramón Castilla | Chargé d'affairs |
| Juan Crisóstomo Torrico | | May 1865 | November 13, 1865 | Juan Antonio Pezet | Minister plenipotentiary |
| Francisco de Rivero y Ustariz | | March 12, 1866 | 1869 | Mariano Ignacio Prado | Minister plenipotentiary |
| Emilio Bonifaz Febres | | 1869 | 1869 | José Balta | Chargé d'affairs |
| Pedro Gálvez Egúsquiza | | November 25, 1869 | 1875 | José Balta | Minister plenipotentiary |
| José de la Riva-Agüero y Looz-Corswarem | | January 21, 1875 | February 13, 1877 | Manuel Pardo | Minister plenipotentiary |
| Juan Mariano de Goyeneche | | September 4, 1877 | February 1880 | Mariano Ignacio Prado | Minister plenipotentiary and 3rd Condado de Guaqui. |
| Toribio Sanz y Sáenz de Tejada | | February 1880 | February 1882 | Nicolás de Piérola | Minister plenipotentiary |
| Francisco Rosas Balcázar | | February 3, 1882 | 1883 | Lizardo Montero | Minister plenipotentiary |
| José Rafael de Izcue | | October 7, 1884 | April 15, 1886 | Miguel Iglesias | Resident minister |
| Carlos Candamo | | July 6, 1886 | December 10, 1890 | Andrés Avelino Cáceres | Minister plenipotentiary. Son of Manuel Candamo. |
| Andrés Avelino Cáceres | | January 9, 1891 | December 10, 1892 | Remigio Morales Bermúdez | Minister plenipotentiary |
| Gustavo de la Fuente | | April 3, 1892 | 1893 | Remigio Morales Bermúdez | Chargé d'affairs |
| José Francisco Canevaro | | February 13, 1893 | November 15, 1900 | Remigio Morales Bermúdez | Minister plenipotentiary. Duke of Zoagli |
| Carlos de Candamo | | November 29, 1900 | July 18, 1919 | Eduardo López de Romaña | Minister plenipotentiary |
| Mariano H. Cornejo Zenteno | | March 25, 1920 | 1930 | Augusto B. Leguía | Minister plenipotentiary |
| Francisco García Calderón Rey | | 1930 | 1940 | Augusto B. Leguía | Minister plenipotentiary. Son of Francisco García Calderón. |
| Ventura García Calderón Rey | | 1940 | 1940 | Manuel Prado Ugarteche | Minister plenipotentiary to Vichy France. Also a son of Francisco García Calderón. |
| Arturo García Salazar | | 1948 | 1950 | Manuel Prado Ugarteche | Ambassador and Minister plenipotentiary |
| Luis A. Solari Hurtado | | July 13, 1953 | 1956 | Manuel A. Odría | Ambassador |
| Héctor Boza | | 1956 | 1962 | Manuel Prado Ugarteche | Ambassador |
| Óscar Trelles Montes | | 1964 | 1965 | Fernando Belaúnde | Ambassador |
| Francisco Miró Quesada Cantuarias | | 1967 | 1969 | Fernando Belaúnde | Ambassador |
| Augusto Morelli Pando | | 1972 | July 23, 1973 | Juan Velasco Alvarado | Ambassador |
| Julio Óscar Trelles Montes | | 1973 | 1975 | Juan Velasco Alvarado | Ambassador |
| Juan Miguel Bákula Patiño | | 1975 | 1978 | Francisco Morales Bermúdez | Ambassador |
| Alberto Wagner de Reyna | | 1978 | 1980 | Francisco Morales Bermúdez | Ambassador |
| Alfonso Arias-Schreiber Pezet | | 1980 | ? | Fernando Belaúnde | Ambassador |
| Hugo Otero | | 1986 | 1987 | Alan García | Ambassador |
| Nicanor Mujica Álvarez-Calderón | | 1988 | 1990 | Alan García | Ambassador |
| Hugo Ernesto Palma Valderrama | | 1991 | 1995 | Alberto Fujimori | Ambassador |
| María Luisa Federici | | 1996 | 2000 | Alberto Fujimori | Ambassador |
| Javier Pérez de Cuéllar | | 2002 | 2004 | Alejandro Toledo | Ambassador |
| Francisco Miró Quesada Rada | | 2005 | 2006 | Alejandro Toledo | Ambassador |
| Harry Belevan-McBride | | 2007 | 2010 | Alan García | Ambassador |
| José Antonio Arróspide del Busto | | 2011 | 2011 | Alan García | Ambassador |
| Cristina Velita de Laboureix | | 2011 | 2016 | Ollanta Humala | Ambassador |
| Gustavo Lembcke Hoyle | | 2016 | 2016 | Ollanta Humala | Ambassador |
| Álvaro de Soto | | 2017 | 2019 | Pedro Pablo Kuczynski | Ambassador |
| Cristina María del Rosario Ronquillo de Blödorn | | 2019 | March 9, 2022 | Martín Vizcarra | Ambassador |
| Rolando Javier Ruiz Rosas Cateriano | | May 1, 2022 | December 7, 2022 | Pedro Castillo | Ambassador. Accredited to Monaco since July 11, 2022. |

== See also ==
- List of ambassadors of France to Peru
