= British–Peruvian Cultural Association =

Cultural association in Peru

- Asociación Cultural Peruano Británica
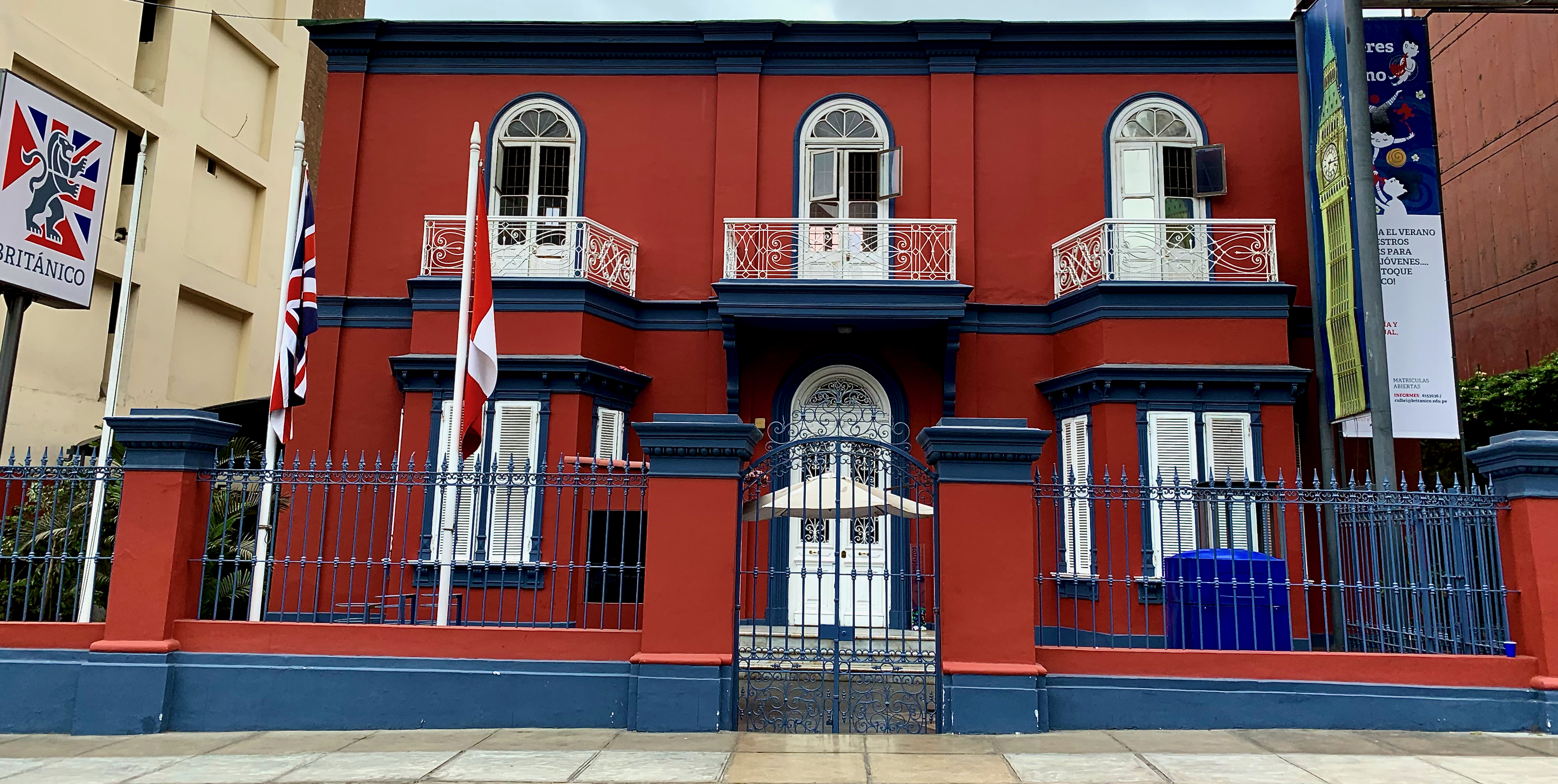
- Miraflores office
- Formation: March 4, 1937; 89 years ago
- Website: www.britanico.edu.pe

The British–Peruvian Cultural Association (Spanish: Asociación Cultural Peruano Británica), also known simply as the BRITÁNICO, is a private non-profit cultural association in Peru that teaches the English language and promotes a cultural integration between Peru and the United Kingdom.

== History ==
The association started with a building in the fourth block of Jirón Junín, part of the historic centre of Lima. In 1968, a second building was opened in Miraflores, with more buildings following afterwards.

The association has seen a number of official state visits from the British royal family. In 1959, the Duchess of Kent and her daughter Alexandra visited the building leased by the association at the Jirón Camaná where its central offices, cinematheque, and central library operated. In 1962, the Duke of Edinburgh visited the same building. The house was ultimately bought from their original owners, the Checa Solari family, in 1980, and renovated in 2018. Other British personalities that visited the building include Aldous Huxley, Arnold J. Toynbee and J. B. Priestley.

The association's teaching centres are located at a number of places in Lima, as well as in Arequipa and Trujillo.

== See also ==
- British Peruvians
- Peru–United Kingdom relations
- Alliance Française de Lima
- Peruvian North American Cultural Institute
