= British American Hospital =

Hospital in Lima, Peru

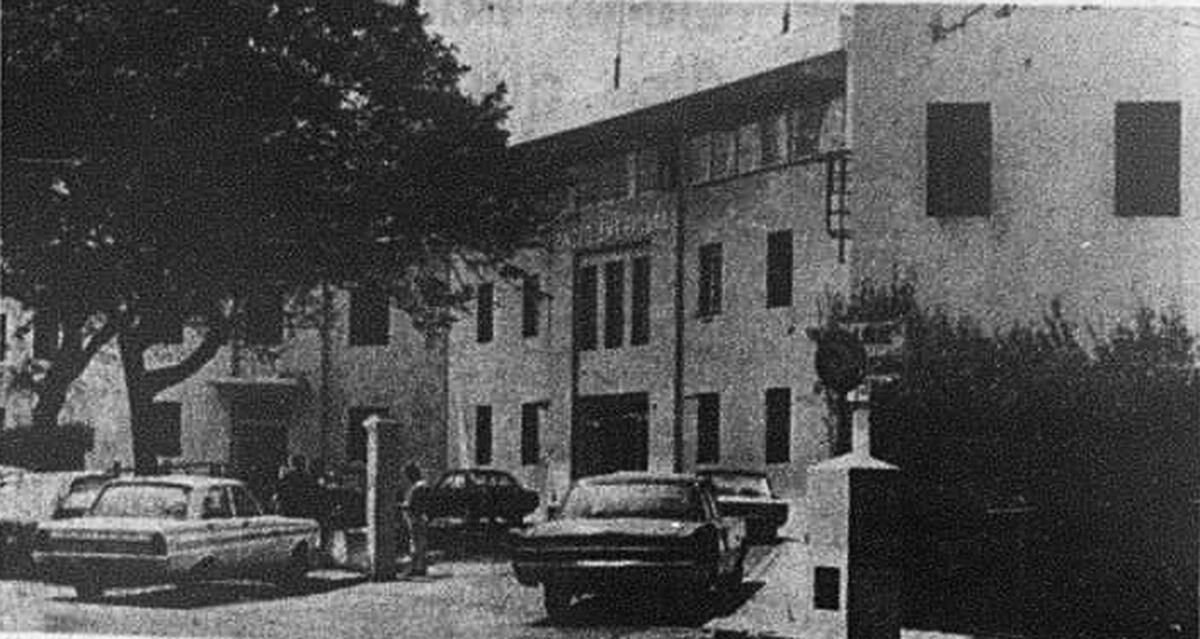

Geography
- Location: Alfredo Salazar 350 (San Isidro); La Fontana 362 (La Molina)

History
- Opened: October 30, 1921 (Callao)

Links
- Website: Official site

The British American Hospital (Spanish: Clínica Anglo Americana, CAA) is a private hospital in Lima, Peru. Originally located in Bellavista, a district of Callao, it is currently located in Lima's San Isidro and La Molina districts.

== History ==
The hospital was founded by local British and American communities, in a former convent—the Convento de las Madres de la Visitación—and barracks of Bellavista District, in Callao, replacing the Casa de Salud Italiana. The centre was originally exclusively English-speaking, and only attended to the aforementioned communities until 1926, when it attended to Peruvian president Augusto B. Leguía. The original site was virtually destroyed by the earthquake of 24 May 1940, after which it sold its premises and moved to Santa Cruz, a neighbourhood of San Isidro.

The new hospital was built by Spalding & Sabogal at the 10,852 m^{2} terrain in San Isidro, acquired at S/. 7.50 per metre. In February 1942, then still under construction, patients started to be treated there. During the Peruvian conflict, it was the site of terrorist attacks. It celebrated its 50th anniversary at the Municipal Palace's Independence Hall.

== See also ==
- British Peruvians
