= Lycée Franco-Péruvien =

French international school in Lima, Peru

Lycée Franco-Péruvien Spanish: Colegio Franco Peruano
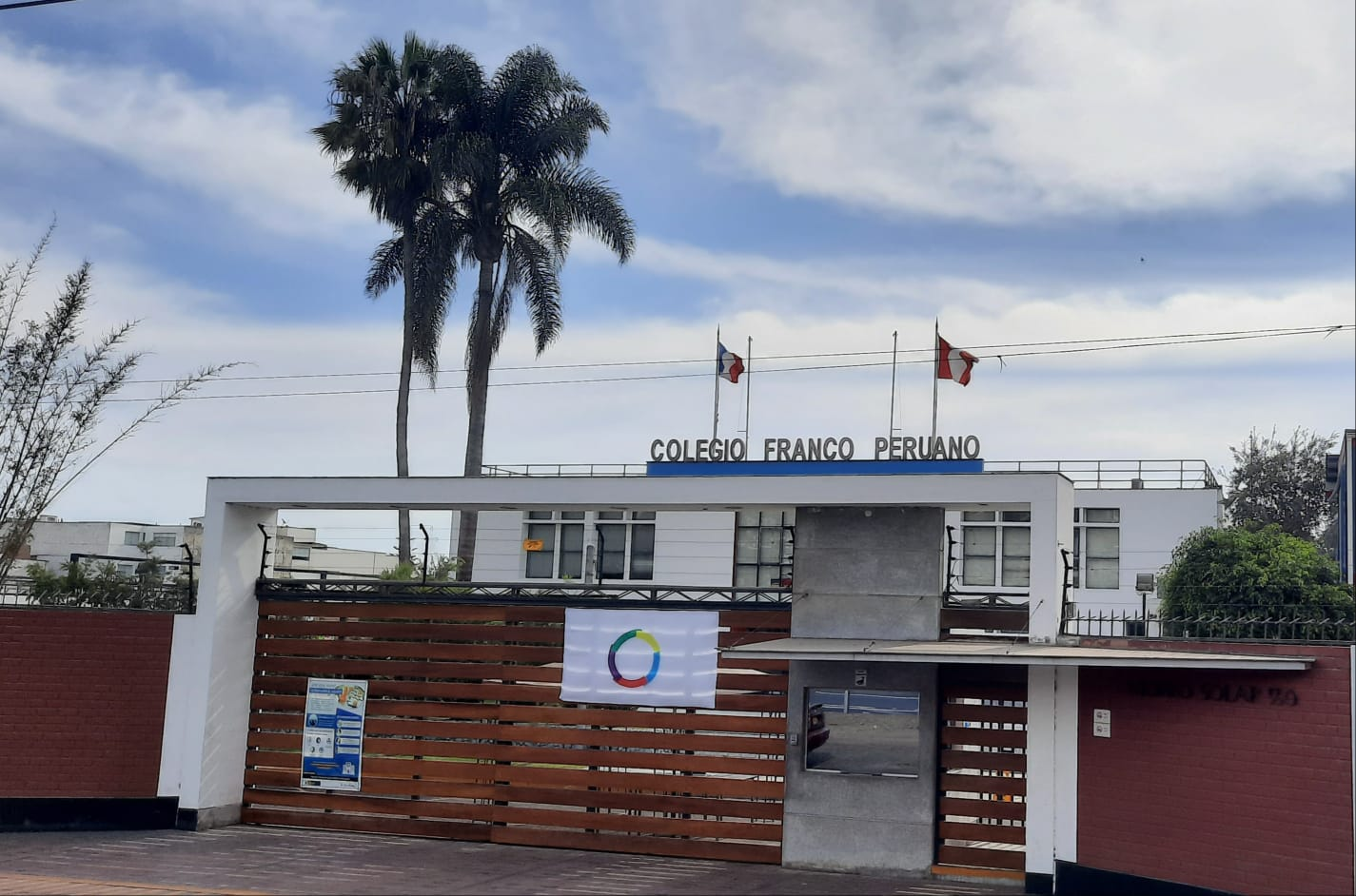

Location
- Lima; Peru

Information
- School type: International School
- Established: 1950; 75 years ago
- Language: French

Lycée Franco-Péruvien (Francopé; Spanish: Colegio Franco Peruano) is a French international school in Monterrico, Lima, Peru. It serves levels maternelle (preschool) through lycée (senior high school).

It was first established as École Nouvelle/Escuela Nueva in Miraflores in 1950. On August 30, 1959, André Malraux, the French minister of culture, laid the headstone of the school's new building. It moved to its current site in 1960.

== See also ==
- France–Peru relations
- Alliance Française de Lima
