= France–Peru relations =

- France: Peru

France–Peru relations (French: Relations France-Pérou; Spanish: Relaciones Francia y Perú) are foreign relations and diplomatic ties between the French Republic and the Republic of Peru. Both nations are members of the United Nations, the Latin Union and the World Trade Organization.

== History ==
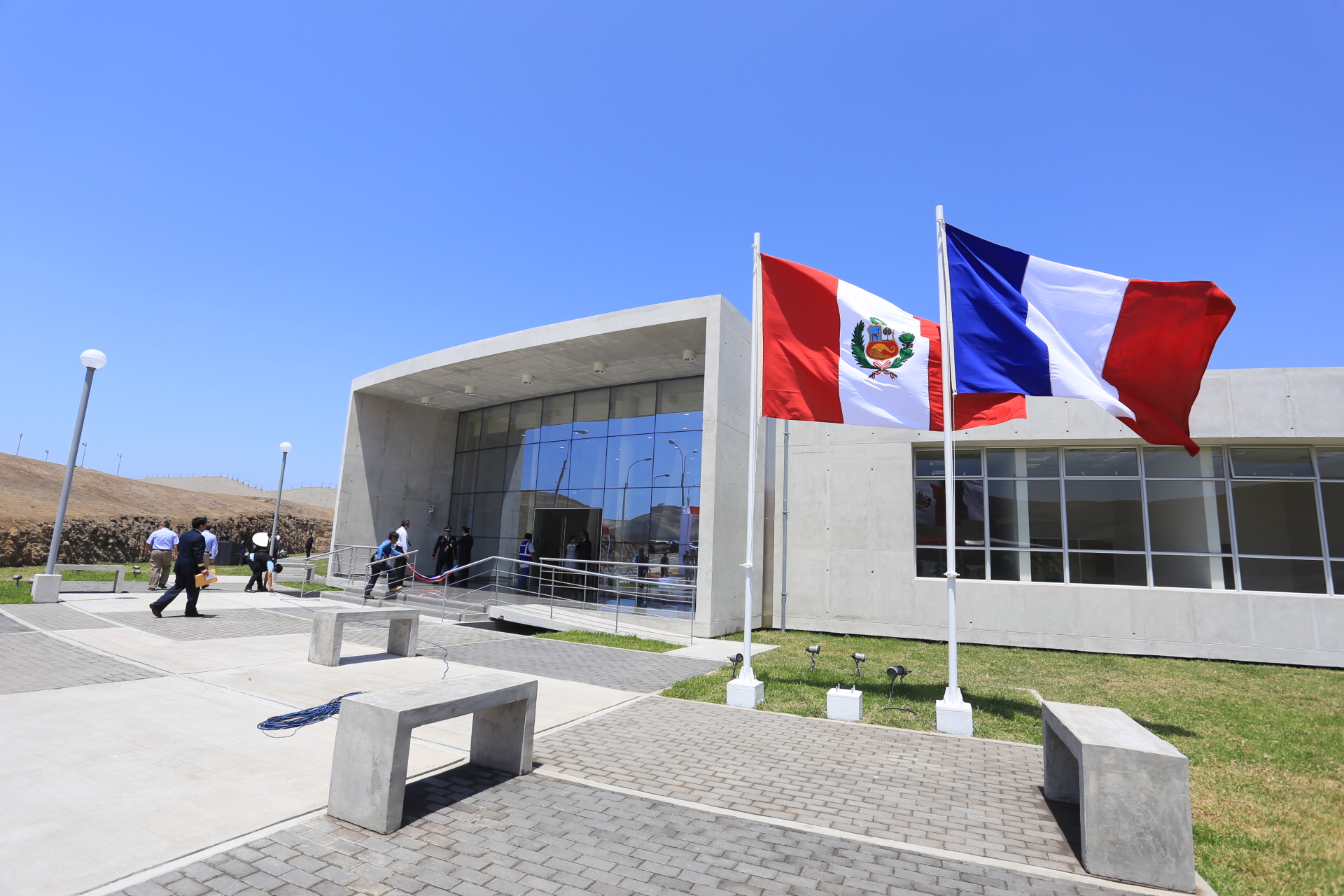
The Peruvian National Center of Operations for Satellite Images uses French satellites and was built with the assistance of the French government

French sailors began visiting Peru on trade missions to Asia and would stop in Peru beginning in the 18th century. After Peru declared its independence from the Spanish Empire in 1821, French migrants began immigrating to Peru. By 1825, there existed a small French community of 300 people which resided in Peru. In 1826, France and Peru established diplomatic relations. By 1876, 2,658 French nationals resided in Peru. Many of the French migrants in Peru were artisans, traders and laborers; many originating from Southern France, near the Pyrenees.

During World War II, Peru remained neutral for most of the war. Peru broke diplomatic relations with Vichy France in January 1943 after Operation Torch and the Peruvian government maintained diplomatic relations with the Free France government-in-exile of General Charles de Gaulle. After the war, both nations normalized diplomatic relations.

In February 1960, Peruvian President Manuel Prado Ugarteche paid a three-day official visit to France. In 1964, French President Charles de Gaulle paid an official visit to Peru. In 1973, Peru severed diplomatic relations with France in protest of French nuclear testing in the South Pacific Ocean. The rupture lasted until 1975.

Since the re-establishment of diplomatic relations between both nations; there have been several high-level visits between leaders of both nations. Peruvian of French descent make up the third largest community of European origin in Peru. At the same time, there is a sizable number of Peruvian citizens residing in France.

== High-level visits ==
Presidential visits from France to Peru

- President Charles de Gaulle (1964)
- President François Mitterrand (1987)
- President François Hollande (2016)

Presidential visits from Peru to France

- President Manuel Prado Ugarteche (1960)
- President Alberto Fujimori (1991)
- President Alejandro Toledo (2001, 2003)
- President Ollanta Humala (2012, 2013, 2014, 2015)
- President Pedro Pablo Kuczynski (2017)

== Bilateral relations ==
Both nations have signed several bilateral agreements, such as an Agreement in Cultural, Scientific and Technical Cooperation (1972); Agreement in Financial Cooperation (1975); Agreement on Judicial Assistance in Criminal Matters (2012); Agreement on Transportation Cooperation (2013); Extradition Treaty (2013); Agreement in Defense Cooperation (2013); Agreement for the Acquisition by the Peruvian Government for an Optical Satellite System for the Observation of Earth's Symmetrical Resolution (2014); Agreement on Educational Cooperation (2013) and an Agreement on a Working holiday visa (2018).

== Transportation ==
There are direct flights between Lima and Paris with Air France.

== Trade ==
In 2012, Peru (along with Colombia) signed a free trade agreement with the European Union (which includes France). In 2017, trade between France and Peru totaled €699 million Euros. France's main exports to Peru include: mechanical equipment, electrical, electronic and IT equipment and other industrial products. Peru's main exports to France include: agricultural products, logging, fishing and aquaculture products, and natural gas. Peru is France's 93 largest trading partner globally and 8th largest trading partner in Latin America.

== Resident diplomatic missions ==
- France has an embassy in Lima.
- Peru has an embassy and a consulate general in Paris.
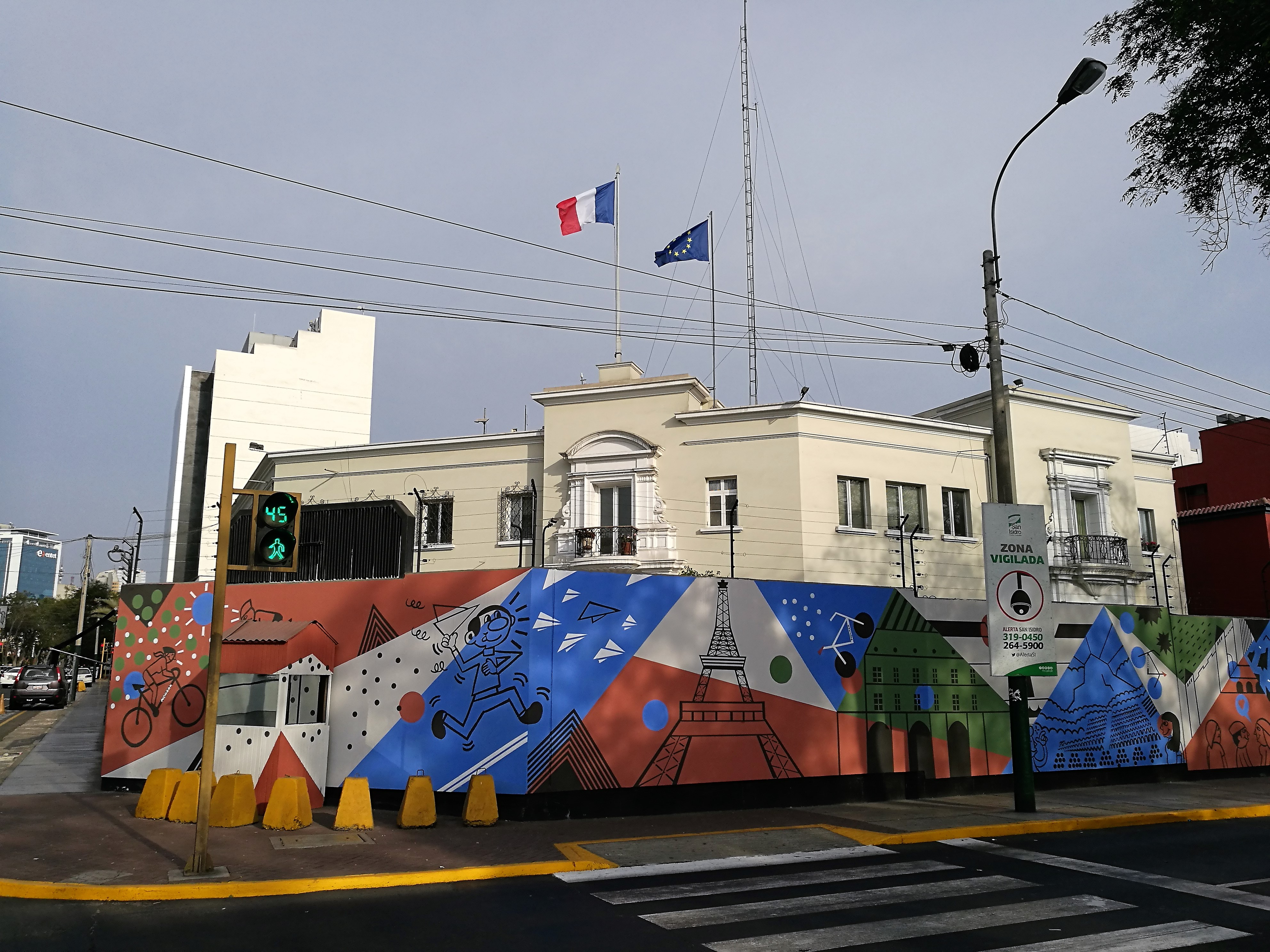
Embassy of France in Lima

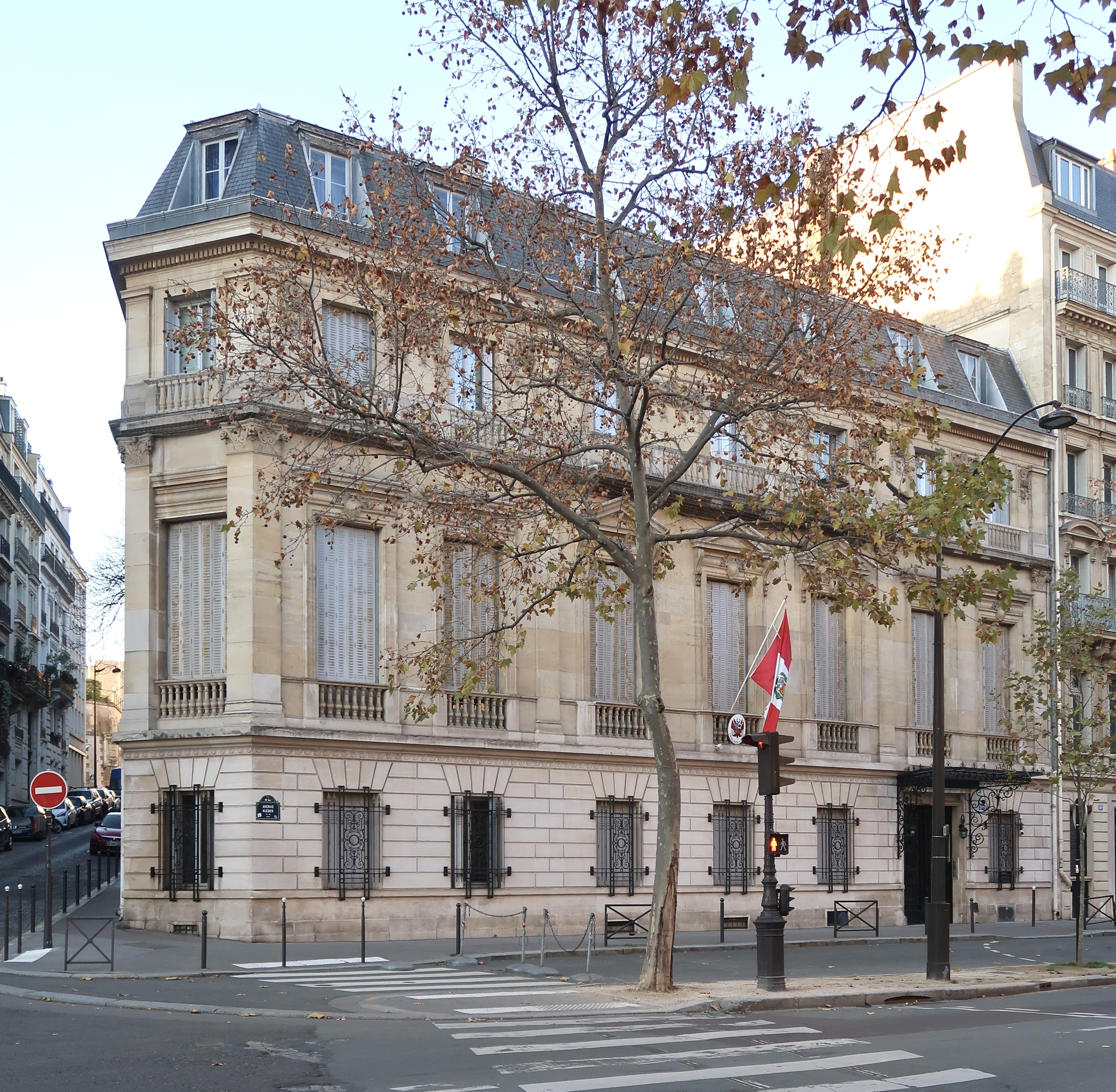
Embassy of Peru in Paris

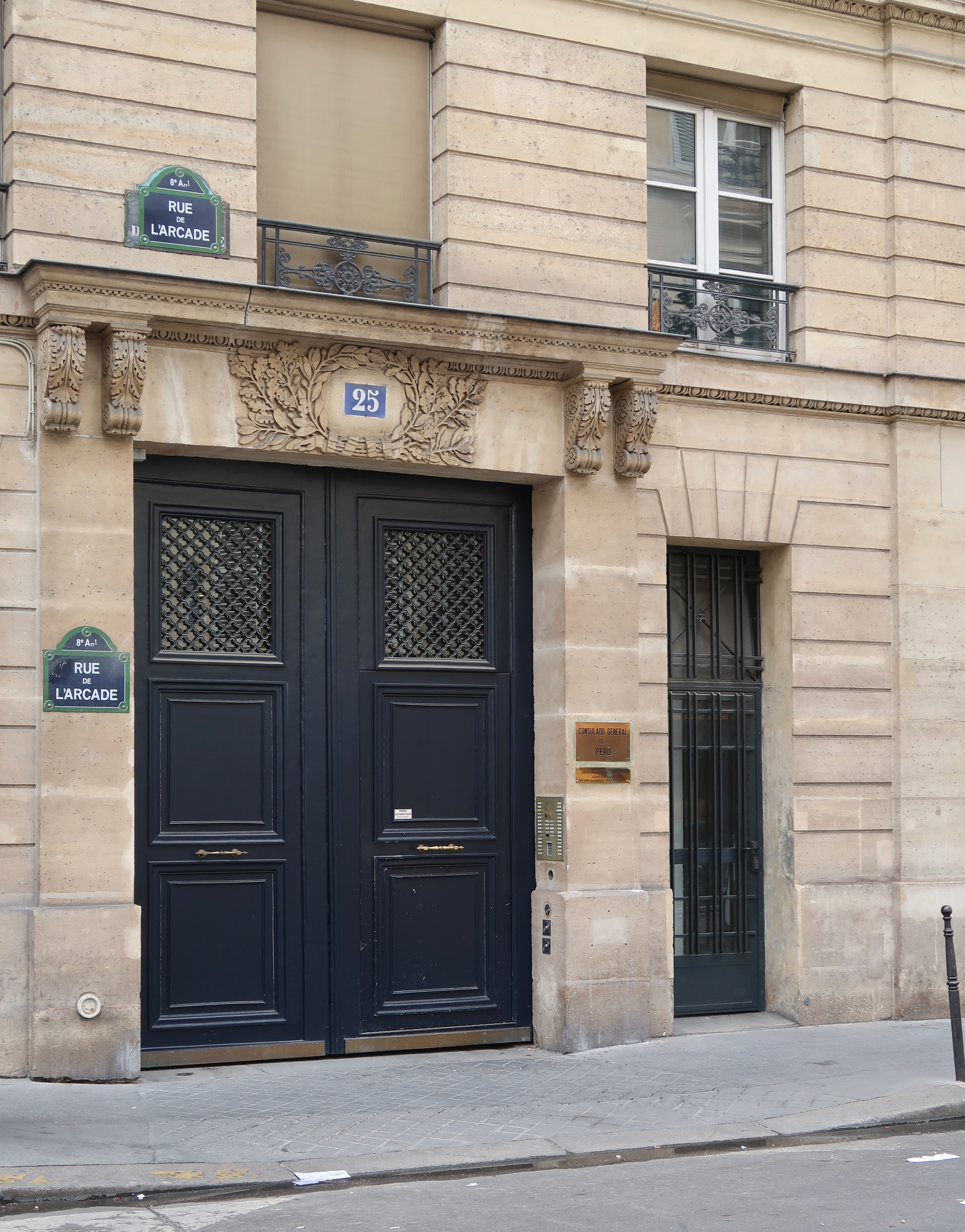
Consulate-General of Peru in Paris

== See also ==
- List of ambassadors of Peru to France
- List of ambassadors of France to Peru
- French Peruvians
- Jorge Chávez
- Lycée Franco-Péruvien
- Peruvians in France
- Alliance Française de Lima
