= Avenue Kléber =

Avenue in Paris, France

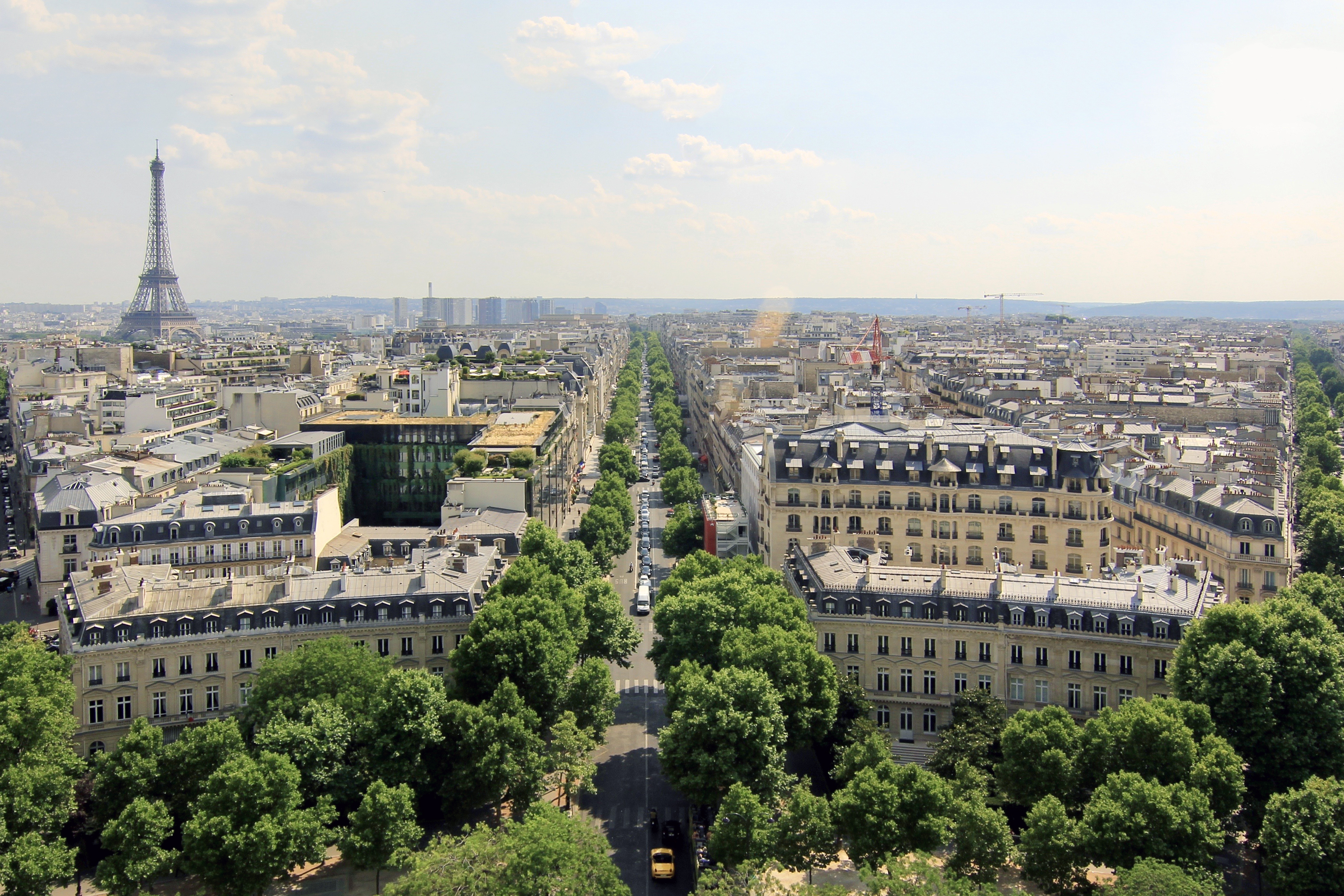
- View of the Avenue Kléber

- Location within Paris
- Length: 1,135 m (3,724 ft)
- Width: 36 m (118 ft)
- Arrondissement: 16th
- Quarter: Chaillot
- Coordinates: 48°52′11.00″N 2°17′31.70″E
- From: Place Charles de Gaulle
- To: Place du Trocadéro

Construction
- Completion: 1863
- Denomination: August 16, 1879

The Avenue Kléber (French pronunciation: [avny klebɛʁ]) is an avenue in the 16th arrondissement of Paris, France, one of the twelve avenues that converge on the Place Charles de Gaulle. It was named after Jean Baptiste Kléber, a French general during the French Revolutionary Wars. Before 1879, it was called the Avenue du Roi-de-Rome, in memory of Napoleon II.

The avenue is "lined with grand examples of the ceremonial, yet never austere, buildings favored by Haussmann." Of note are the Icelandic and Peruvian embassies (no. 8 and no. 50, respectively), the Hôtel Raphael at no. 17, and The Peninsula Paris hotel at no. 19.

French composer Henri Büsser lived at no. 71. Jennie Jerome, Lady Randolph Churchill, lived at no. 34 shortly after the death of her husband.

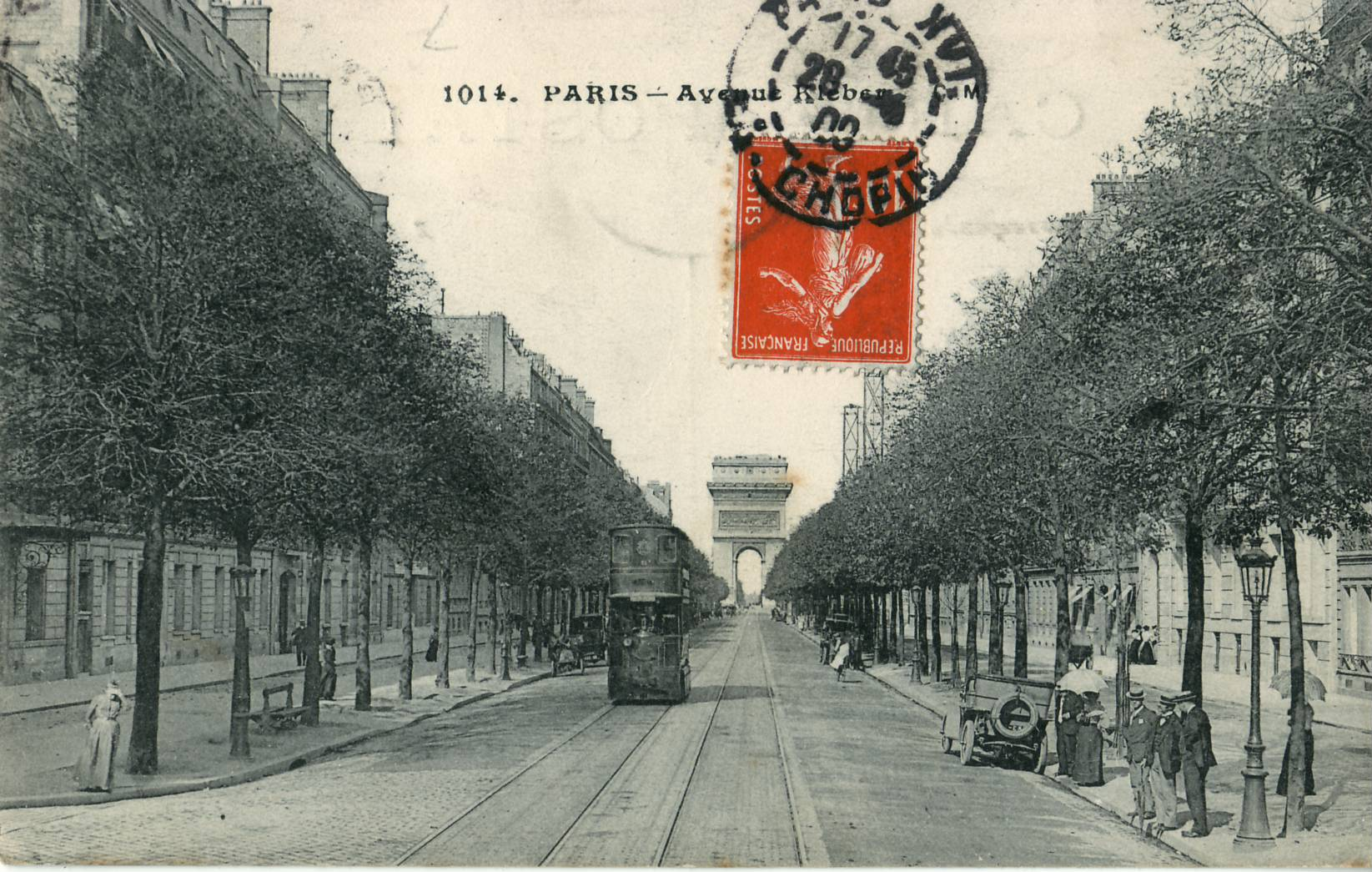
Historic postcard

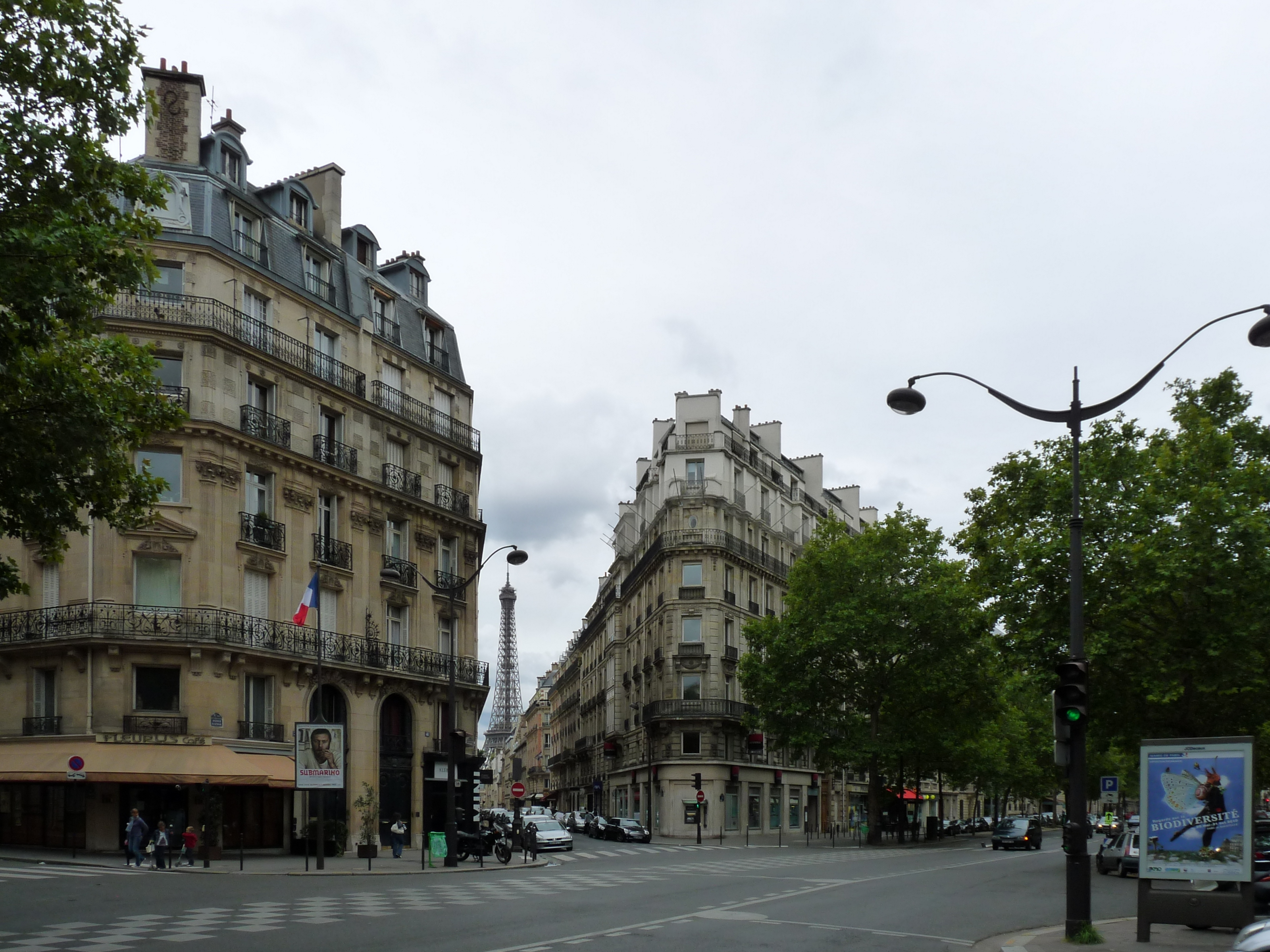
Avenue Kléber in 2010

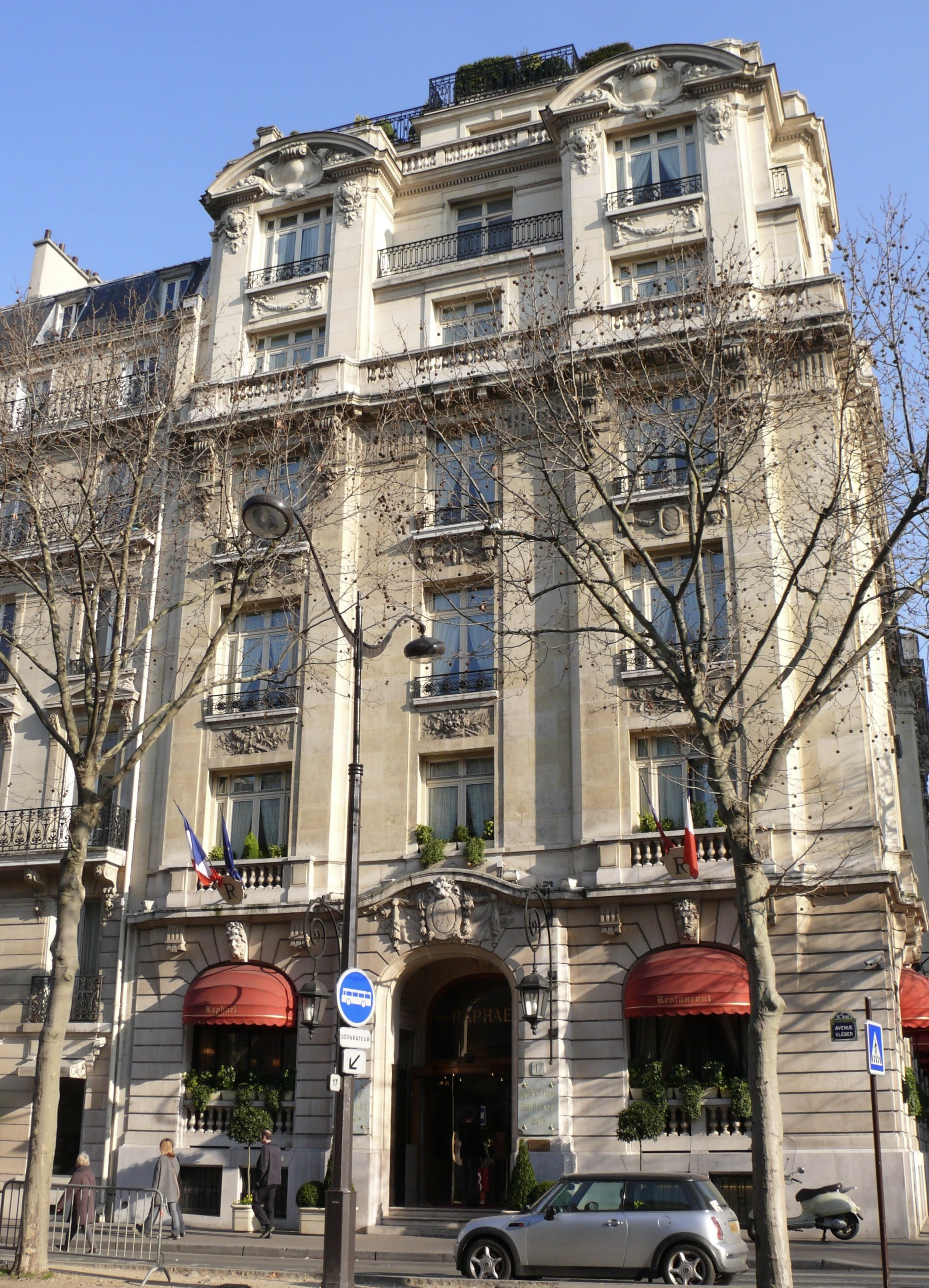
No. 17

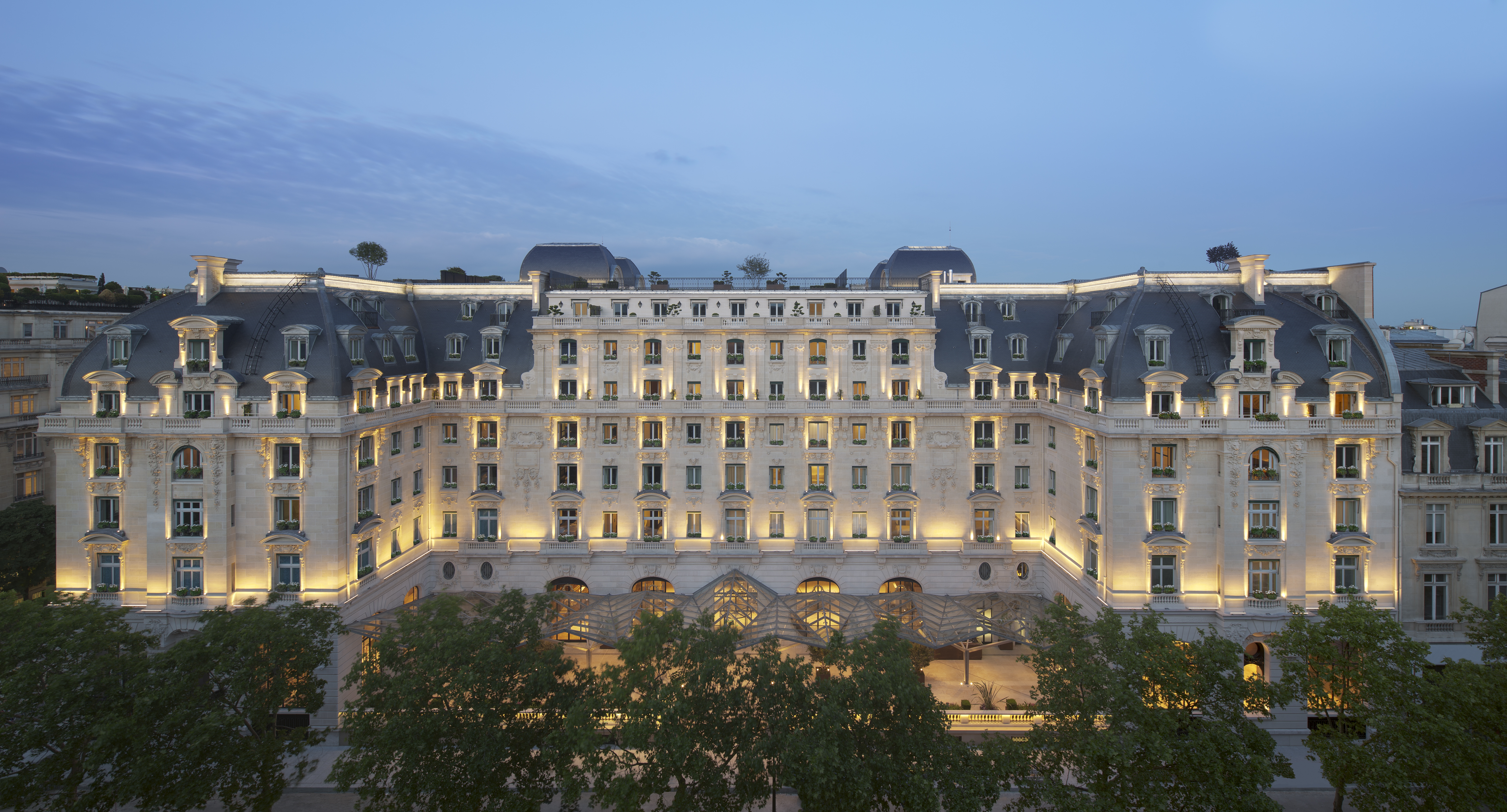
No. 19

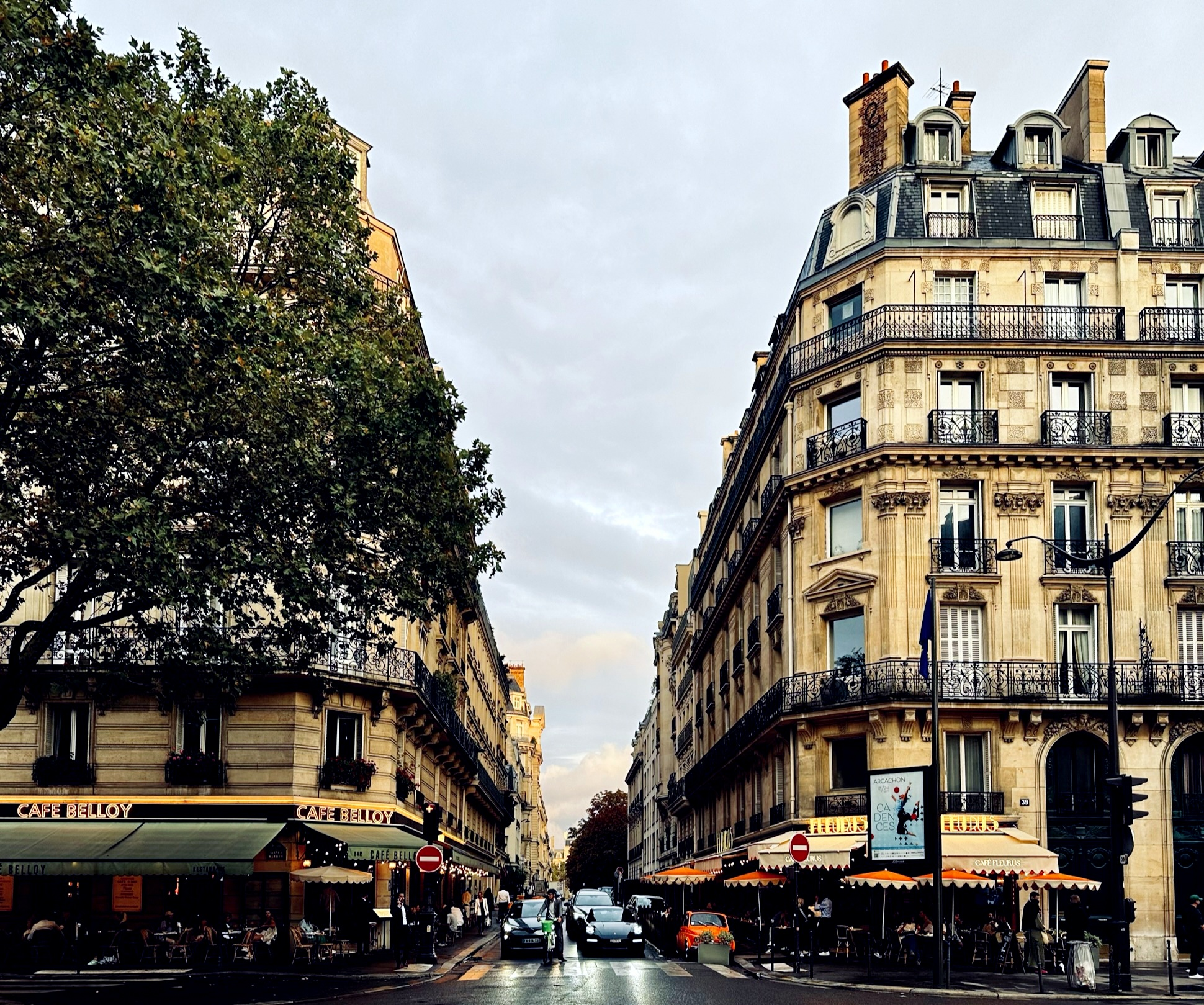
Nos. 37 and 39 facing the Rue de Belloy

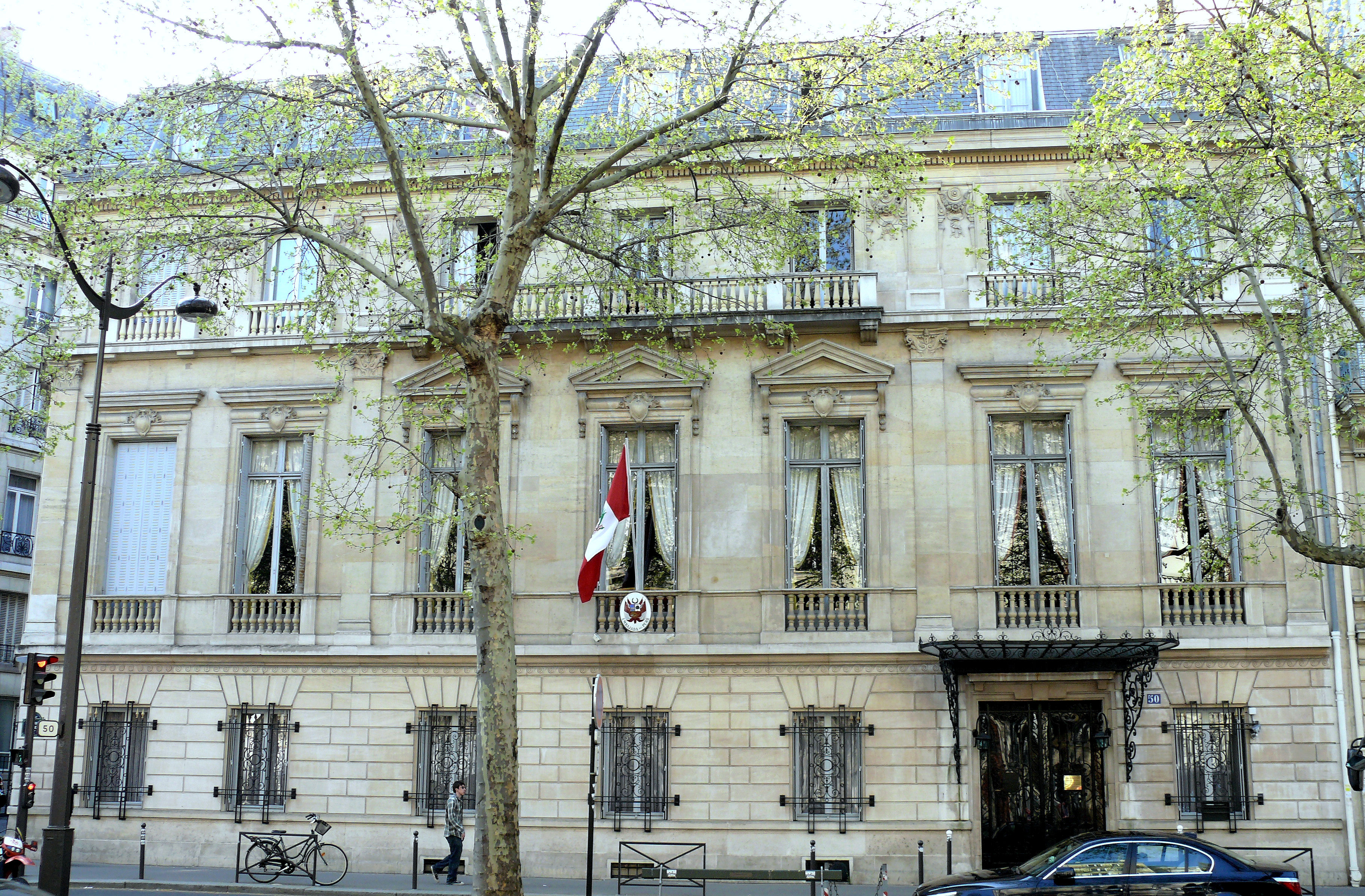
No. 50

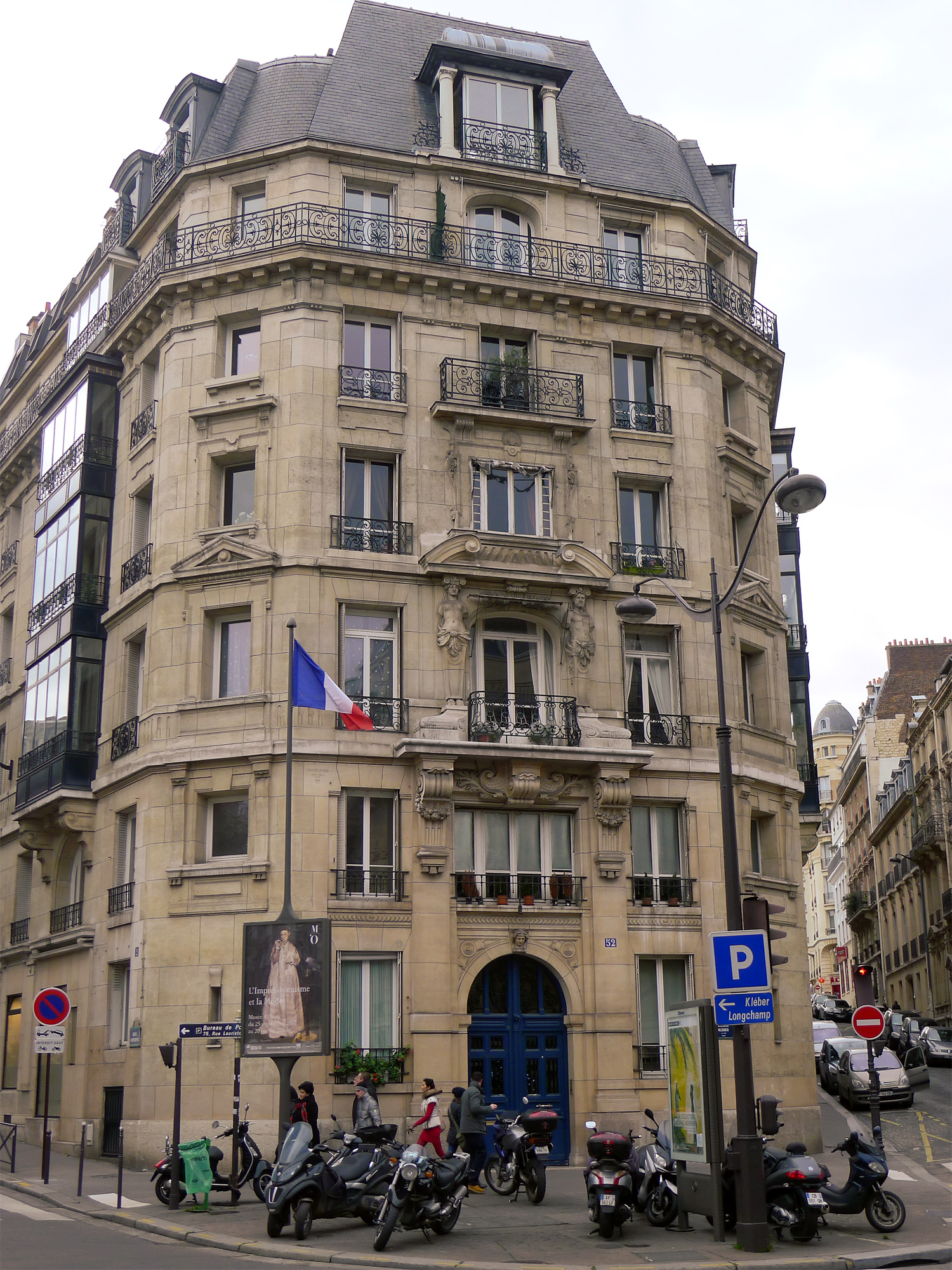
No. 52

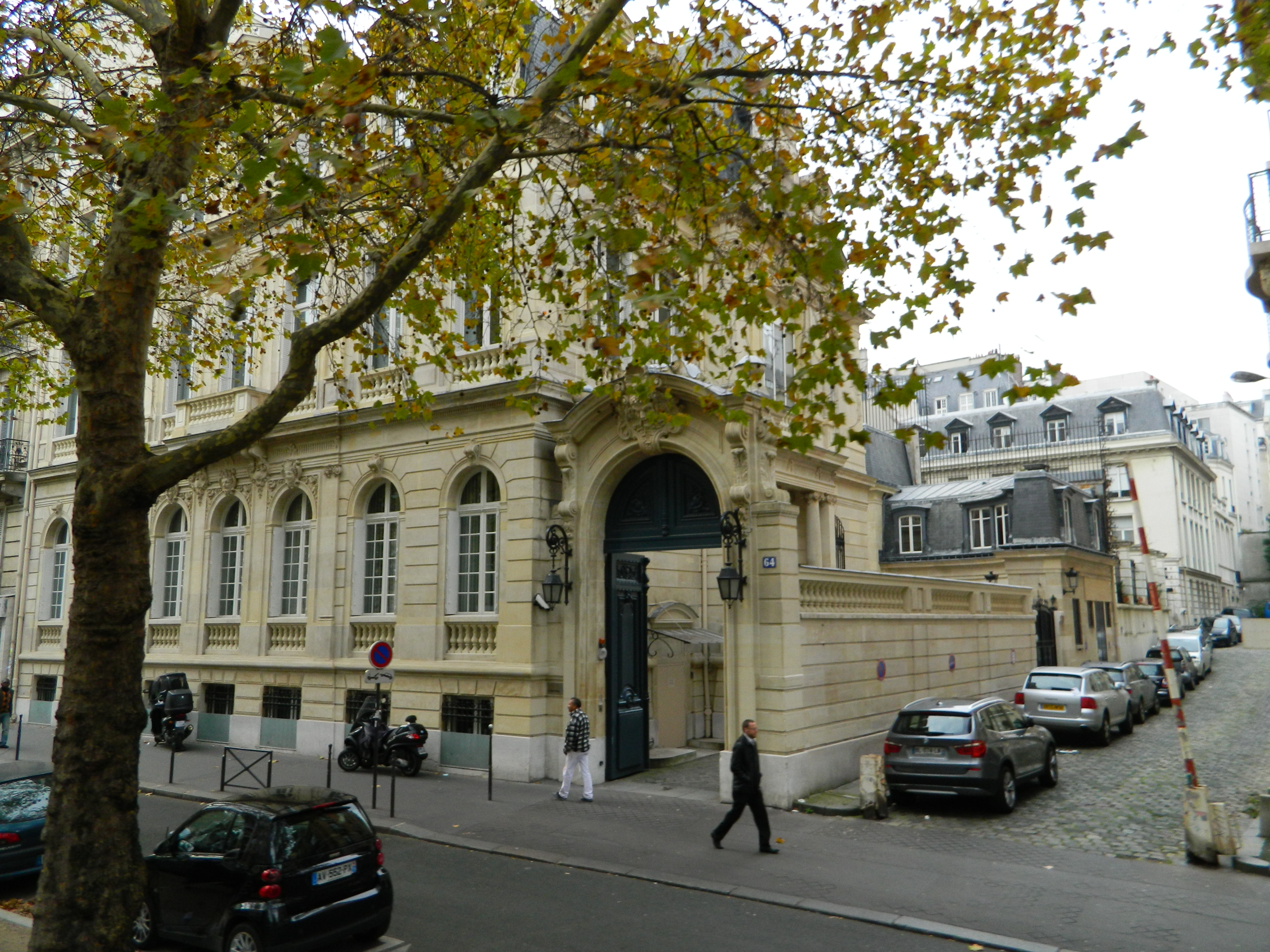
No. 64

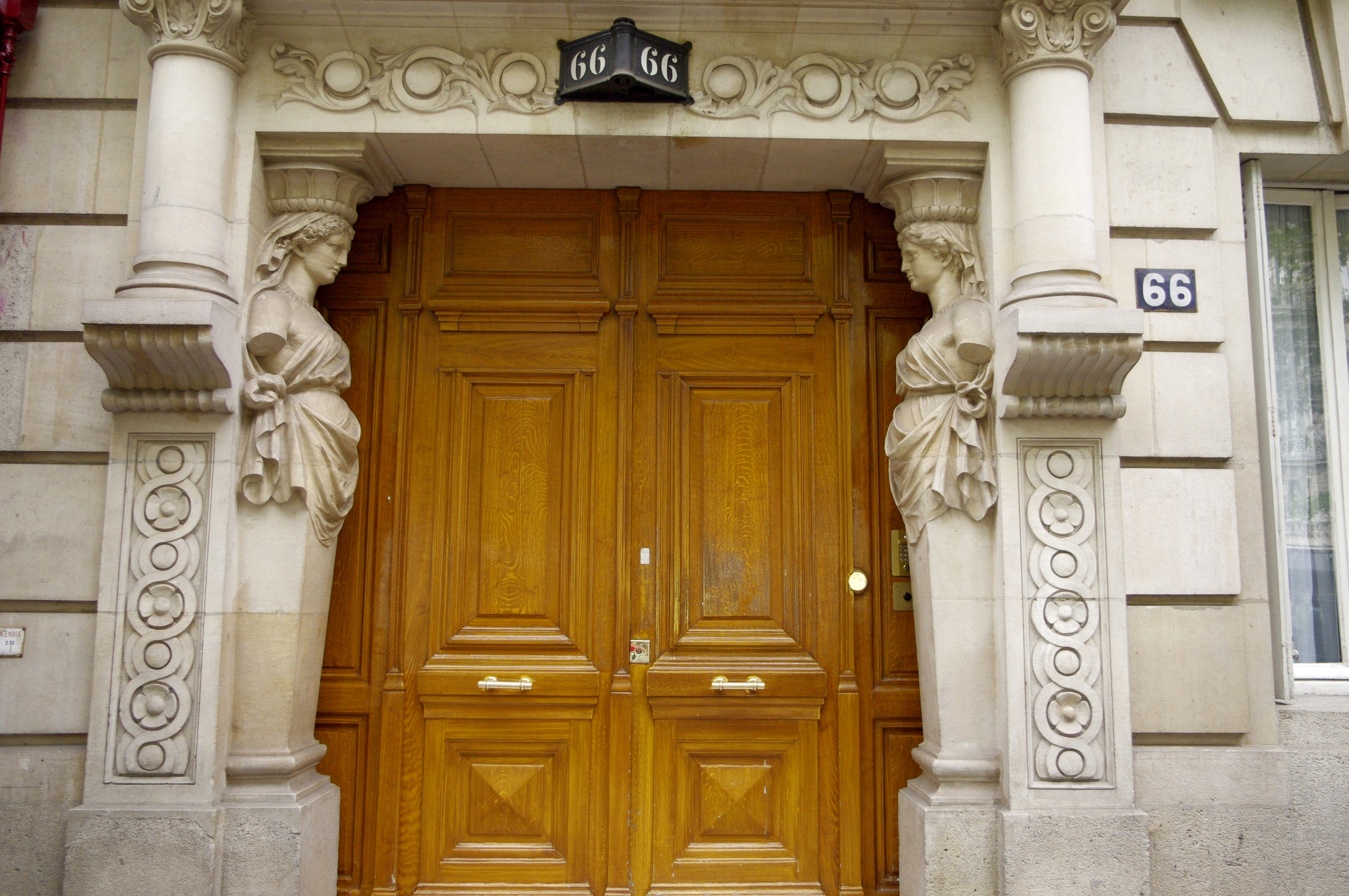
No. 66
