= Cécile Pozzo di Borgo =

French diplomat and politician

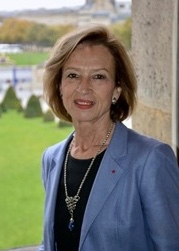

Prefect of the French Southern and Antarctic Lands
- In office 18 September 2014 – 30 October 2018
- Preceded by: Pascal Bolot
- Succeeded by: Évelyne Decorps

Prefect of Aveyron
- In office 18 September 2011 – 14 October 2014
- Preceded by: Danièle Polvé-Montmasson
- Succeeded by: Jean-Luc Combe

French Ambassador to Peru
- In office 2008–2011
- Preceded by: Pierre Charasse
- Succeeded by: Jean-Jacques Beaussou

French Ambassador to the Dominican Republic
- In office 2005–2008
- Preceded by: Jean-Claude Moyret
- Succeeded by: Roland Dubertrand

Personal details
- Born: Cécile Marie Thérèse Mouton-Brady; 4 January 1952 (age 74) Paris, France
- Spouse: Alain Pozzo di Borgo
- Education: École Nationale des Chartes
- Occupation: Diplomat

Cécile Pozzo di Borgo (born 4 January 1952) is a French diplomat and politician.

== Early life ==
Pozzo di Borgo was born as Cécile Marie Thérèse Mouton-Brady on 4 January 1952 in the 16th arrondissement of Paris, with roots from the Basque Country. She is the daughter of diplomat Jean Mouton-Brady, and she spent her childhood in various European countries. She is an alumna of the École Nationale des Chartes and paleographer archivist (class of 1975).

== Career ==
Pozzo de Borgo was the first curator of diplomatic archives at the Ministry of Foreign Affairs (1975-1987). In 1987, she became a technical adviser to Bernard Bosson, Minister Delegate for European Affairs. Then, in 1992, she was appointed adviser to the French Embassy in Belgium, and in 1998, head of the International Affairs Department in the Raw Materials Department of the Secretariat of State to Industry. From 2000 to 2002, she was deputy director of Communication, then deputy director of Communication and Information and Deputy Spokesperson of the Ministry of Foreign Affairs. She also served as Ambassador of France to the Dominican Republic (2005-2008) and later Peru (2008-2011).

In November 2011, Pozzo di Borgo took up her duties as prefect of Aveyron, with an agenda that included inter-communality in the department, road junctions, and water supply for agricultural production. She served in this position until 2014. On 18 September 2014, she was appointed prefect of the French Southern and Antarctic Lands (TAAF), by presidential decree. On 20 February 2018, she asserted her pension rights. Her stint was marked by the arrival of L'Astrolabe. In May 2018, she officially retired from her position as prefect of TAAF.

For Pierre Jullien, from Le Monde, Pozzo di Borgo led an "atypical" career, being neither 'from the prefectural corps' nor 'out of the ENA'.

== Personal life ==
Pozzo di Borgo is married to Alain Pozzo di Borgo, and they have three children. She is the sister-in-law of Philippe Pozzo di Borgo.

== Awards ==
- France
  - Officer of the Ordre national du Mérite (2011)
  - Officer of the Légion d'honneur (2016)
  - Officer of the Ordre des Arts et des Lettres (2016)
