= Isaac Lindley =

Peruvian businessman

Isaac Lindley (1904–1989) was a Peruvian businessman. He is the son of the founders of the soft drink Inca Kola.
