= Peruvian North American Cultural Institute =

Cultural center based in Lima, Peru

- Instituto Cultural Peruano Norteamericano
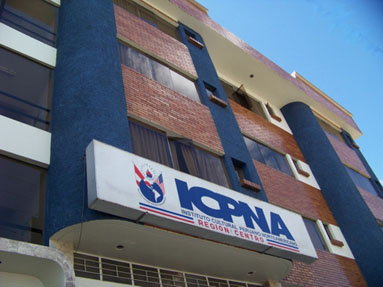
- Building in Huancayo
- Formation: July 15, 1938; 88 years ago
- Headquarters: Lima
- Website: www.icpna.edu.pe

The Peruvian North American Cultural Institute (Spanish: Instituto Cultural Peruano Norteamericano; ICPNA, [ipna]) is a binational cultural centre that teaches American English and promotes the cultural exchange between Peru and the United States.

== History ==
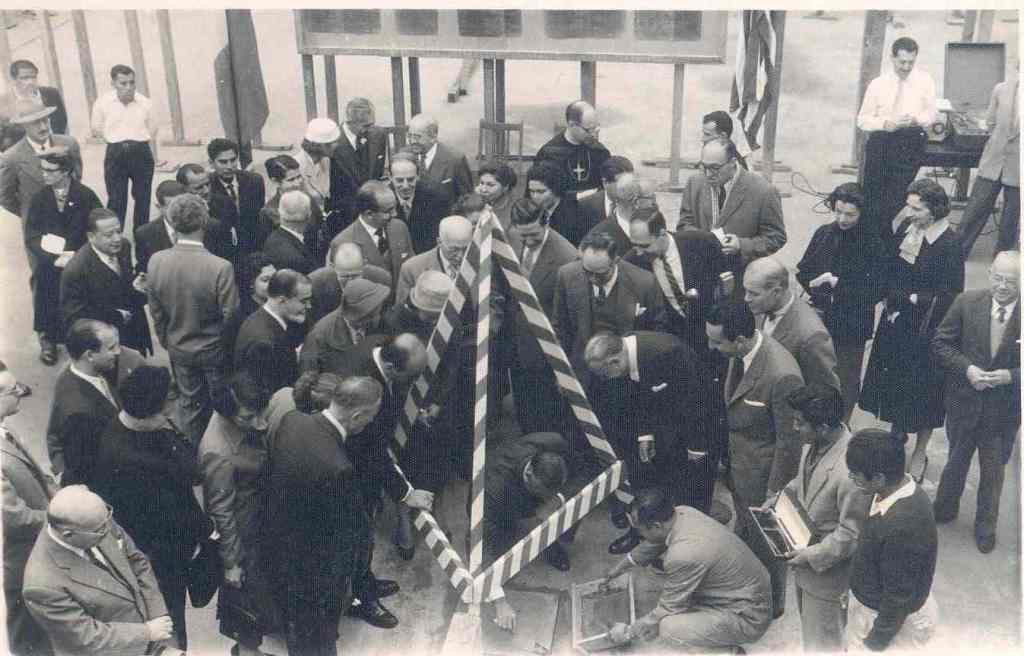
Cornerstone ceremony in Lima.

The institute was inaugurated on June 2, 1938, through an alliance between the U.S. Embassy and a group of intellectuals, after which it acquired a building of its own in the Jirón de la Unión (No. 892) in 1942 (it would later move to the calle del Corcovado). Its opening ceremony was attended by then President Manuel Prado Ugarteche. It started publishing its own magazine three years later, directed by Estuardo Núñez Hague, and started events organising events featuring local artists, such as Fernando de Szyszlo in 1947 and Maria Reiche in 1955.

A new building in Miraflores was inaugurated in 1963, which was visited by astronaut Neil Armstrong three years later. Another building was opened in San Miguel in 1997. Since the 21st century, the institute has expanded to other cities in the country.

== See also ==
- Peru–United States relations
- British–Peruvian Cultural Association
- Alliance Française de Lima
