= Hôtel des Ambassadeurs =

Hotel in Vichy notable for hosting foreign embassies during World War II

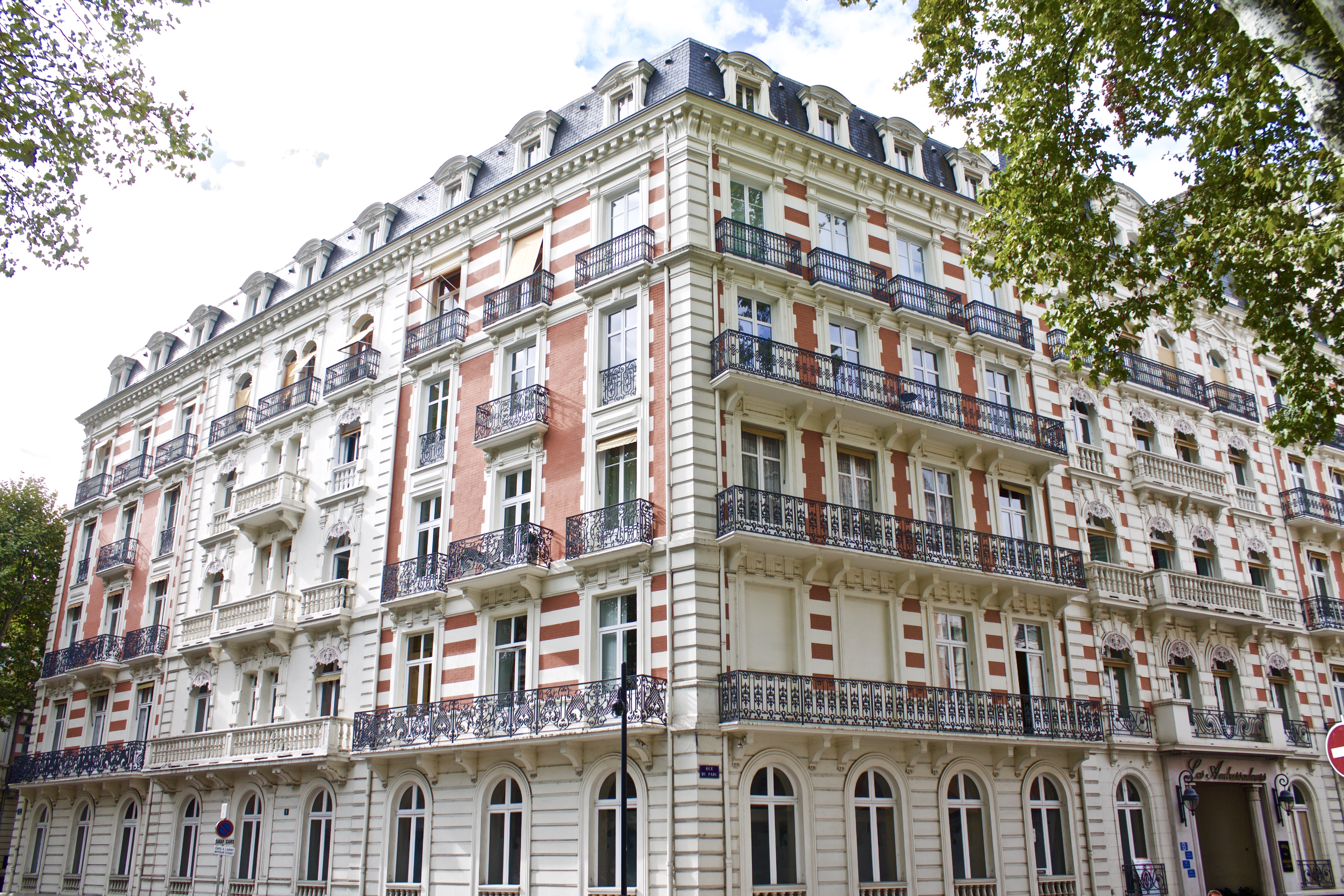
- The former hotel in 2012
- Interactive map of the Hôtel des Ambassadeurs area

General information
- Location: Vichy, France, 1 Rue du Parc
- Coordinates: 46.1228°N 3.4189°E

Technical details
- Floor count: 6

The Hotel des Ambassadeurs (French for "Ambassadors' Hotel") is a former hotel in Vichy, now transformed into a private residence. During World War II, the hotel housed the diplomatic missions that moved from German-occupied Paris to Vichy.

== Location ==
The hotel is located near the Allier river, in the spa district of the city, at 1 rue du Parc and place Joseph-Aletti opposite the opera, adjacent to the Aletti Palace and in the immediate vicinity of the Parc des Sources.

== Description ==
Some rooms on the ground floor with their decor have been registered since March 4, 1991, as a Monument historique of France: the large entrance hall with its lights, staircase and glassware by Francis Chigot, the large living room, the small living room with its painted decoration, the old dining room and the patio.

== History ==
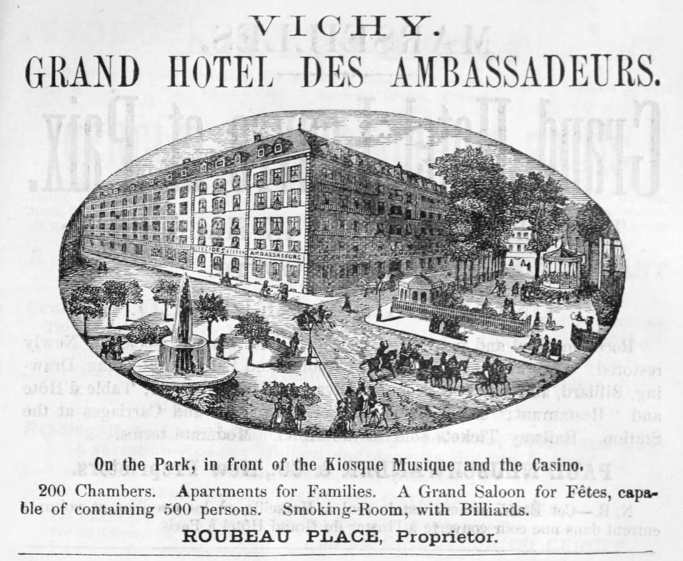
Hôtel des Ambassaderus in the Harper's Hand-Book for Travellers in 1885.

The hotel was built in 1858 but in 1866 it was enlarged and restructured. A renowned hotel, it appeared in the first tourist guides of the time. In 1890, it was one of the first to be equipped with an elevator and a telephone. It then has a hall that can accommodate more than 500 people. In 1897, the rooms were equipped with heating (most hotels operating during the summer season were not equipped with it). In 1900, its owner, Mr. Roubeau, installed electric lighting there. It has adjoining villas around the hotel where whole families can be accommodated while benefiting from the hotel's services, such as the Castel flamand at 1 and 2 rue de Belgique, and three villas on rue de Russie, connected to the hotel through underground passages. During World War I, the hotel was transformed into a military hospital.

=== Residence of the Diplomatic corps ===
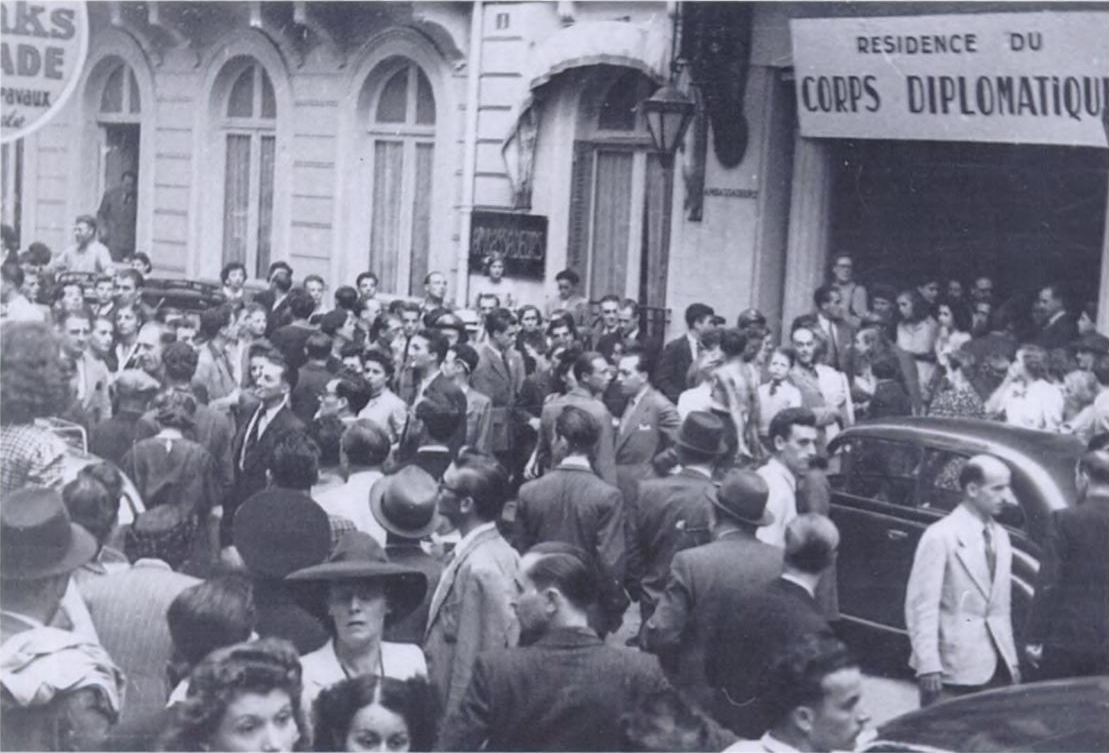
The hotel on August 26, 1944, during the arrival of the French Forces of the Interior.

The hotel played an important role during World War II. After Germany occupied France and established a government based in Vichy, the German government requested that the diplomatic missions based in Paris move to the new provisional capital. Several governments accepted the request and established their missions in the hotel, with over twenty embassies and over forty accredited foreign diplomats moving into the hotel's rooms. Among those missions were:

- Chile
- China (Note: Despite Japanese pressure, the French government did not recognise the Japanese-backed government of Wang Jingwei, instead continuing its relations with the Nationalist government of Chiang Kai-shek.)
- Denmark (Note: Denmark was a protectorate of Germany since 1940. Nevertheless, a legation operated in the hotel until the German occupation of the Zone libre in 1942.)
- Dominican Republic
- Finland
- Holy See
- Hungary
- Japan
- Peru
- Portugal
- Romania
- Soviet Union
- Spain (Note: The mission moved down the road from the hotel in 1941, near what was then the embassy of Mexico.)
- Sweden
- Switzerland (Note: The legation moved next-door on February 2nd, 1943 to the Villa Ica after the U.S.' departure.)
- Turkey
- United States (Note: Also representing the United Kingdom) (Note: The United States severed its relations with the Vichy government in 1942.)

In 1942, the Japanese ambassador to France, Sotomatsu Katō, fell from the window of the Japanese embassy. His funeral was attended by the local diplomatic corps, as were other events, such as the marriage of Dominican envoy Porfirio Rubirosa and Danielle Darrieux or an Orthodox mass held for King Peter II of Yugoslavia. One of the more prominent diplomats who stayed at the Hôtel des Ambassadeurs was Minister Walter Stucki, the Envoy of the Swiss Confederation. In 1944, he was celebrated as the saviour of the city of Vichy. The hotel closed definitively in 1989 and was transformed into a building with private apartments in 1998.

== Gallery ==
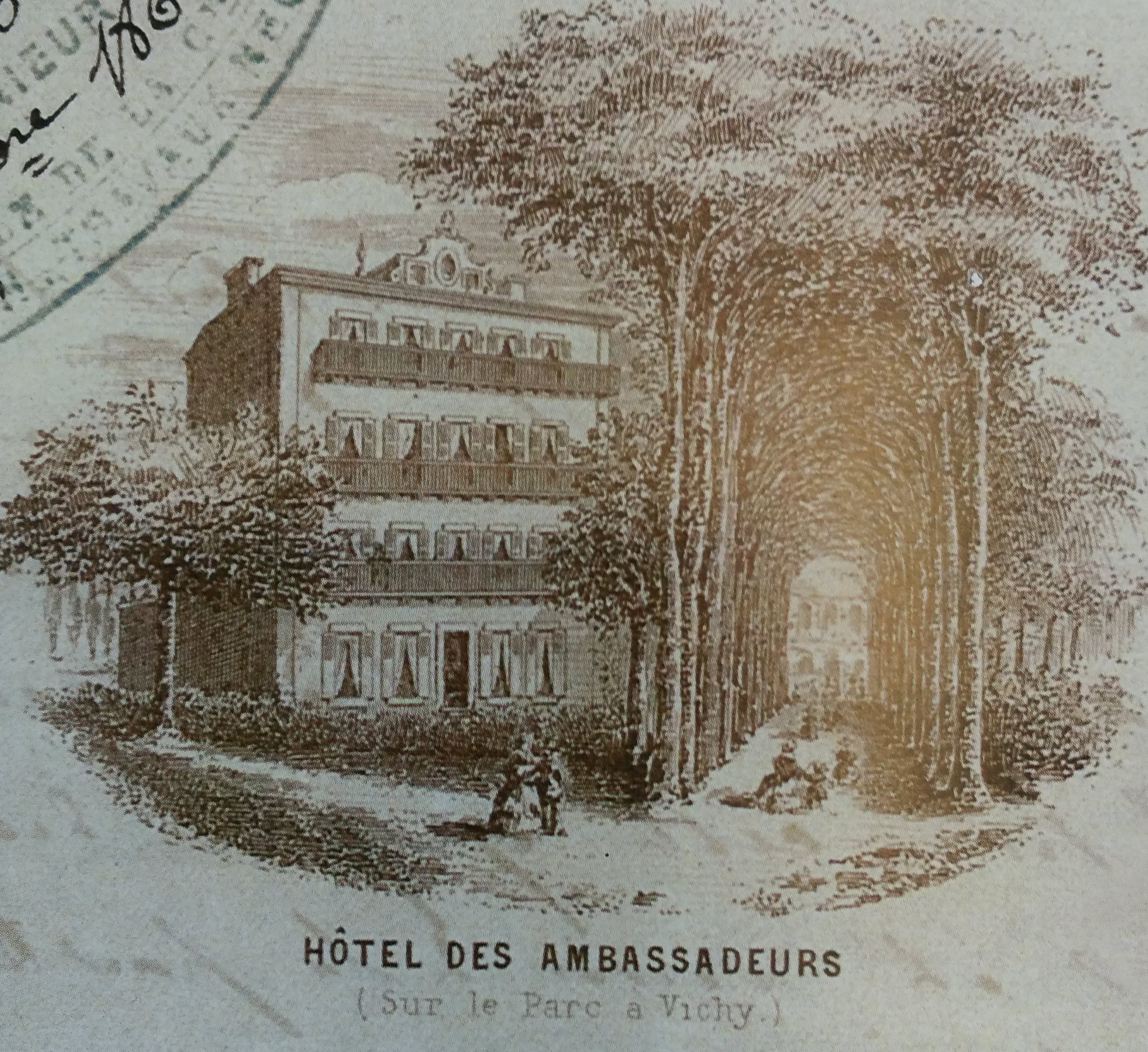
The first hotel before its renovation

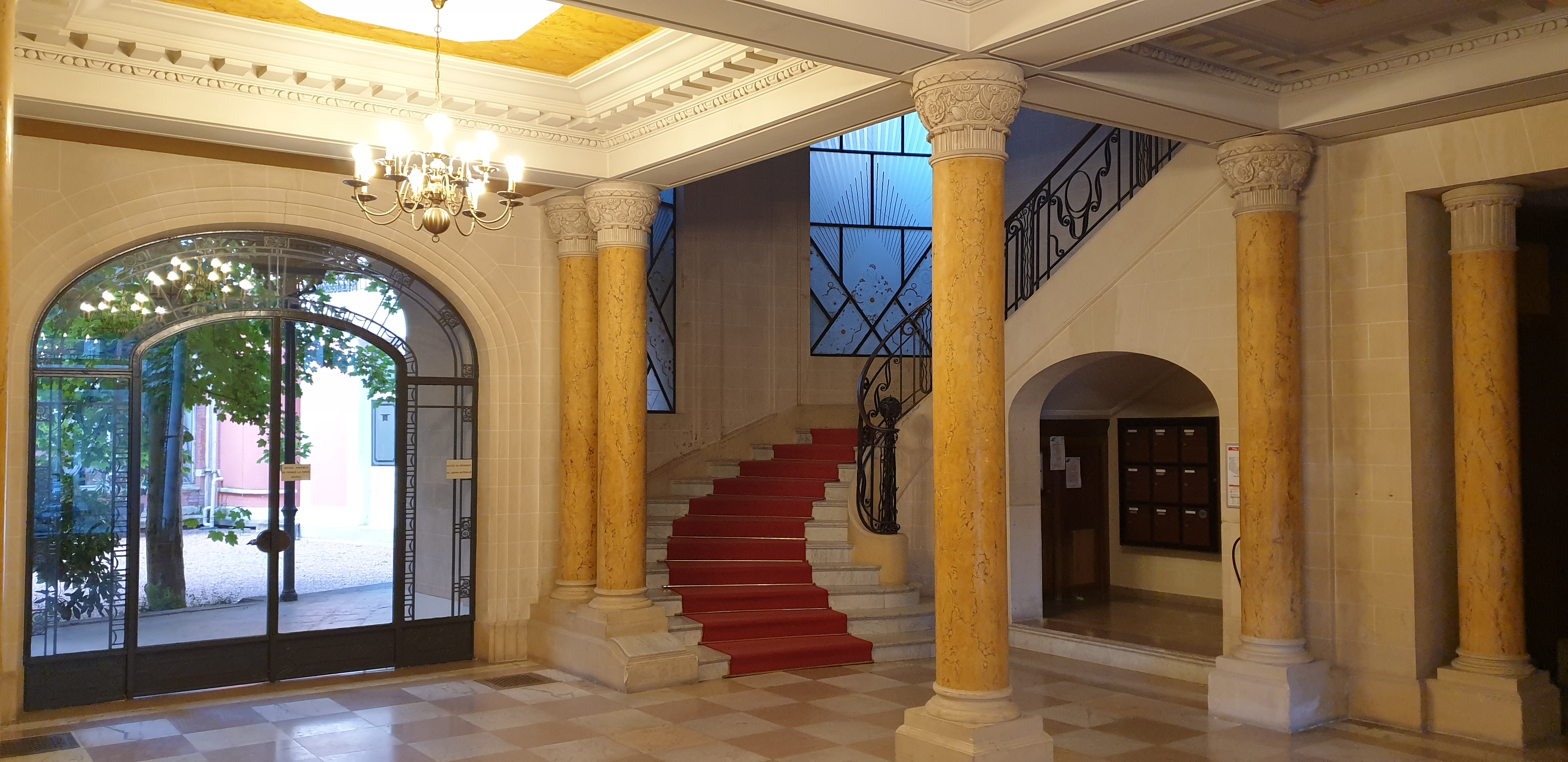
The large entrance hall with its lights, staircase and glassware by Francis Chigot.

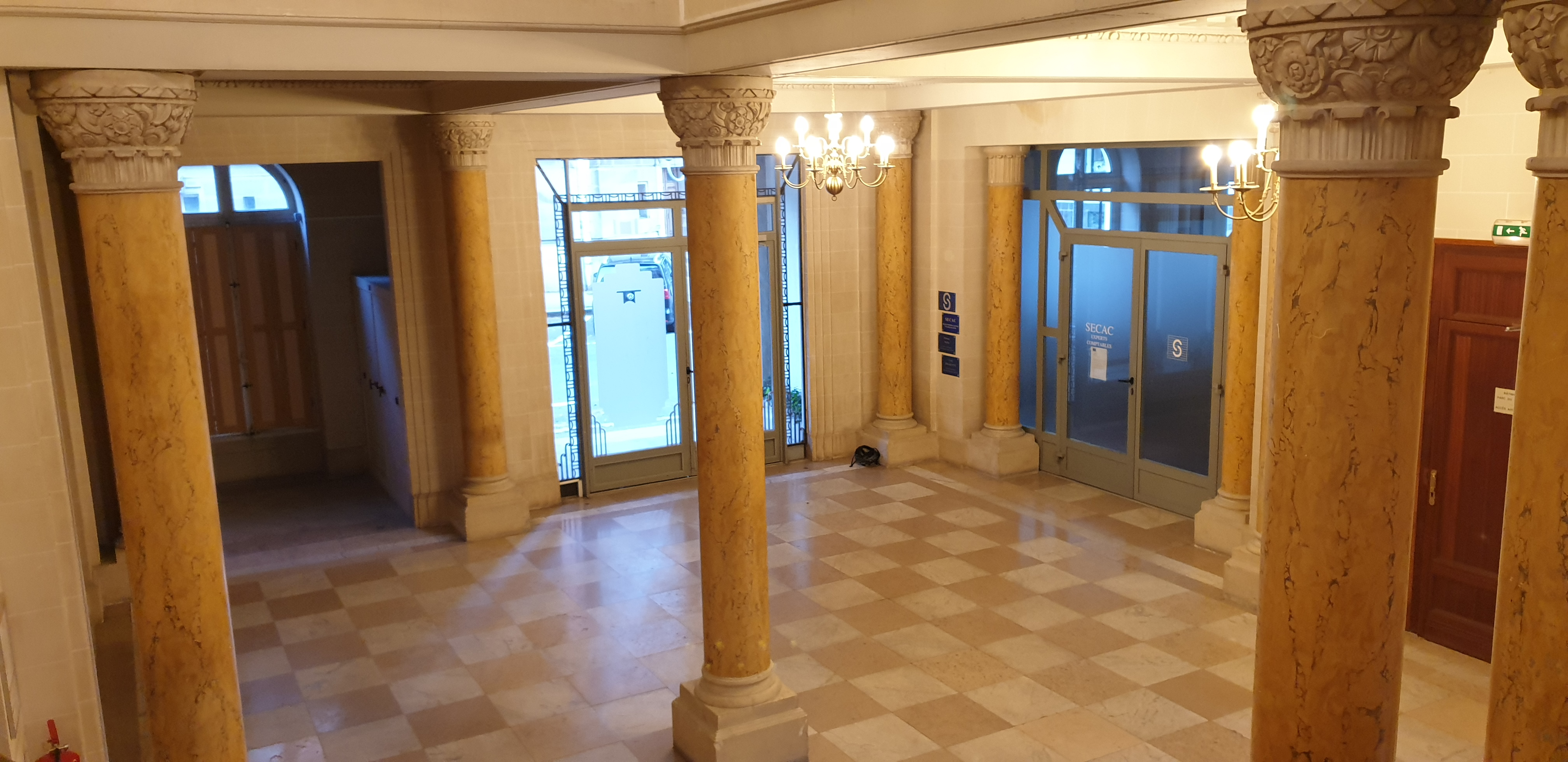
The great hall seen from the staircase.

== See also ==
- Hôtel du Parc, the former residence of Philippe Pétain and former location of the Vichy government's offices
- Foreign relations of Vichy France
