= Germany–Peru relations =

- Germany: Peru

Diplomatic mission
- Embassy of Germany, Lima: Embassy of Peru, Berlin

Germany–Peru relations (German: Deutschland und Peru Beziehungen; Spanish: Relaciones Alemania y Perú) are the historical and bilateral relations between the Federal Republic of Germany and the Republic of Peru. The relations are described by the German Foreign Office as "close and friendly". Cooperation between Germany and Peru takes place at both the bilateral and multilateral level. Both countries are members of the United Nations.

== History ==
=== Early history ===
The first German to arrive in Peru was the Nuremberg-born Conquistador Bartolomé Flores. He came to Peru in 1537 and was involved in the suppression of an Inca rebellion by the Spanish. In the 18th century, the Viceroyalty of Peru was visited by German Jesuits, who published travelogues. In 1890, Fürchtegott Leberecht von Nordenflycht arrived in Peru, where he headed a German mining commission that was supposed to reform mining and smelts in Peru. However, his work was hampered by corrupt authorities and ended in 1811. Nine years later, Clemens von Althaus was taken up by the troops of the South American freedom fighter General José de San Martín, and von Althaus later became a general himself in the Army of Peru.

Beginning in 1849, a law passed by Ramón Castilla allowed the immigration of Germans to Peru, and in 1856 German colonists were granted permission to settle in the Peruvian Amazon. In 1859, Kuno Damian von Schütz-Holzhausen founded a colony in Pozuzo. After an arduous crossing, 150 Tyroleans, Rhinelanders and Bavarians settled here. While German agricultural colonies were not very successful, German immigrants soon took an important role in trade and manufacturing. For example, the Gildemeister family, who immigrated from Bremen, dominated the sugar trade. Most German immigrants were unmarried men who often married into Peruvian families and were with time assimilated into the Spanish-speaking majority society. In 1870, Theodor von Bunsen was appointed Consul General of the North German Confederation and later the German Empire in Peru, which was established soon after. In 1872, a German school was founded in Lima.

=== 20th century ===
In 1917, Peru broke off diplomatic relations with Germany during World War I under pressure from the Entente cordiale and the United States. Relations were resumed after the war in 1921. After Adolf Hitler came to power, some persecuted German Jews emigrated to Peru, including the lawyer Michael Siegel. During World War II, Peru remained neutral for a long time and only broke off diplomatic relations with Nazi Germany in January 1942 after the entry of the United States into the war. As a result, German assets in the country were confiscated. Shortly before the end of the war, Peru declared war on Germany in February 1945, although this had only symbolic significance.

The Federal Republic of Germany (FRG) opened an Embassy in Lima in 1952. The expropriation of German individuals and companies in Peru was lifted two years later by government decree. Bilateral relations were deepened in the 1960s, and Heinrich Lübke, President of the FRG, visited Peru in 1964. A cultural agreement was concluded two years later, and the German-Peruvian Chamber of Commerce and Industry was established in 1968.

=== Relations with East Germany (1972–1990) ===
East Germany–Peru relations

- East Germany: Peru

Diplomatic mission
- East German Embassy, Lima: Embassy of Peru, East Berlin

East Germany–Peru relations were formally established with the signing of a treaty on 28 December 1972, between representatives of Peru and the German Democratic Republic (GDR) as a result of the end of the Hallstein Doctrine. This also coincided with Juan Velasco Alvarado's presidency after a successful coup d'état in 1968. After relations were established, an East German delegation headed by Viceminister of International Economic Affairs, Friedman Clausnitzer, made an official visit to Lima from 6 to 10 February 1973. The objective of the visit was to promote bilateral trade. The East German government subsequently opened an embassy in Lima.

One year later, both countries signed their first treaty on 27 May 1974. The treaty concerned the exchange of technology and scientific knowledge, including qualified staff. Also signed was a protocol that provided 20 scholarships for Peruvian students for the years 1974 and 1975, as well as a trade agreement. On 21 August, a fishing cooperation treaty was signed in East Berlin. On 30 April 1975, two treaties were signed: the first one concerned the establishment of East German companies in Peru and was signed as part of the official visit of Trade Minister Luis Arias Graziani, which took place from 27 April to 1 May. The second treaty was a trade agreement.

On 29 September, a cultural cooperation agreement was signed, and from 23 to 25 October, a Peru–GDR Joint Committee was held in the city of Lima, chaired by Peruvian Trade Minister Felipe Estremadoyro and East German Trade Viceminister Gerd Moenkemeyer. A second committee was held from 30 November to 2 December 1981, chaired by Peruvian ambassador Hubert Wieland and Dr. Werner Hänold. During the meeting, economic cooperation was valued at US$ 10 million. On 11 June 1982, the Banco de la Nación signed a credit agreement with the Deutsche Außenhandelsbank of East Germany.

On 14 June 1988, the final act of the meeting held in Berlin between the president of the Institute of Foreign Trade of Peru, Dr. Enrique Cornejo, and the Minister of Foreign Trade, Dr. Gerhard Beil, was signed. On 24 April 1990, an executive programme for cultural cooperation was created. On 3 October, the unification of West and East Germany was approved, with the Peruvian Chancellery receiving a note on 17 October, recognising the treaty signed on 31 August.

=== Relations since 1990 ===
After German Reunification, Peru moved its embassy from Bonn to Berlin in November 2001.

In 2008, Peruvian President Alan Garcia turned down a US$2 million donation from the German government to build and maintain for 10 years a museum dedicated to the victims of political repression.

== Economic relations ==
Both countries have established close economic ties, and a Free Trade Agreement between Peru and the European Union has been in place since 2011 and in force since 2013. The bilateral trade volume between Germany and Peru was $2.2 billion in 2021. Germany mainly exports chemicals and pharmaceutical products and industrial goods such as automobiles, auto parts, and machinery to Peru. In return, Germany imports mainly raw materials (copper, gold, and zinc) and foodstuffs (coffee, cocoa, and bananas) from Peru. Among the most important German foreign direct investments in Peru is the Lima Airport, in which Fraport AG owns shares.

Germany provides economic aid and technical assistance in Peru. The joint partnership focuses on the environment, good governance, and sustainable urban development to help the country move closer to OECD standards.

== High-level visits ==
High-level visits from Germany to Peru

- President Heinrich Lübke (1964)
- Viceminister Friedman Clausnitzer (1973; representing the GDR)
- Bundestag President Wolfgang Thierse (2004)
- Parliamentarians Anette Hübinger, Wolfgang Wodarg and two more (2007)
- Parliamentarians Ute Granold, Alois Karl, Florian Toncar, Volker Beck and others (2007)
- Congressman Jürgen Klimke (2007)
- Minister Heidemarie Wieczorek-Zeul (2008)
- Minister Frank-Walter Steinmeier (2015)
- President Joachim Gauck (2015)

High-level visits from Peru to Germany

- Minister Luis Arias Graziani (1975)
- Minister Enrique Cornejo (1988)
- President Alejandro Toledo (2003)
- First Lady Eliane Karp (2004)
- Minister Hernán Garrido Lecca (2007)
- Minister José Antonio García Belaúnde (2007)
- President of DEVIDA Rómulo Pizarro (2007)
- Minister Pedro Cateriano (2015)

== Culture and education ==
There are numerous cultural contacts between Peru and Germany. In Pozuzo, there is a German-Austrian colony in the Andes, where many customs and aspects of German culture have been preserved. Since 2015, an increasing number of German-born Mennonites from Mexico and Belize founded new colonies in Peru. There is a Goethe Institute in Lima and a German-Peruvian Cultural Institute in Arequipa.

In education, there are close contacts and numerous bilateral university cooperations. The German Academic Exchange Service is active in the country and in 2019 nearly 1400 Peruvians studied at German universities. There are three German schools in the country and over 20 schools with German as an elective. Nearly 18,500 Peruvians learn German as a foreign language.

== Resident diplomatic missions ==
- Germany has an embassy in Lima.
- Peru has an embassy in Berlin and consulates-general in Frankfurt, Hamburg and Munich.
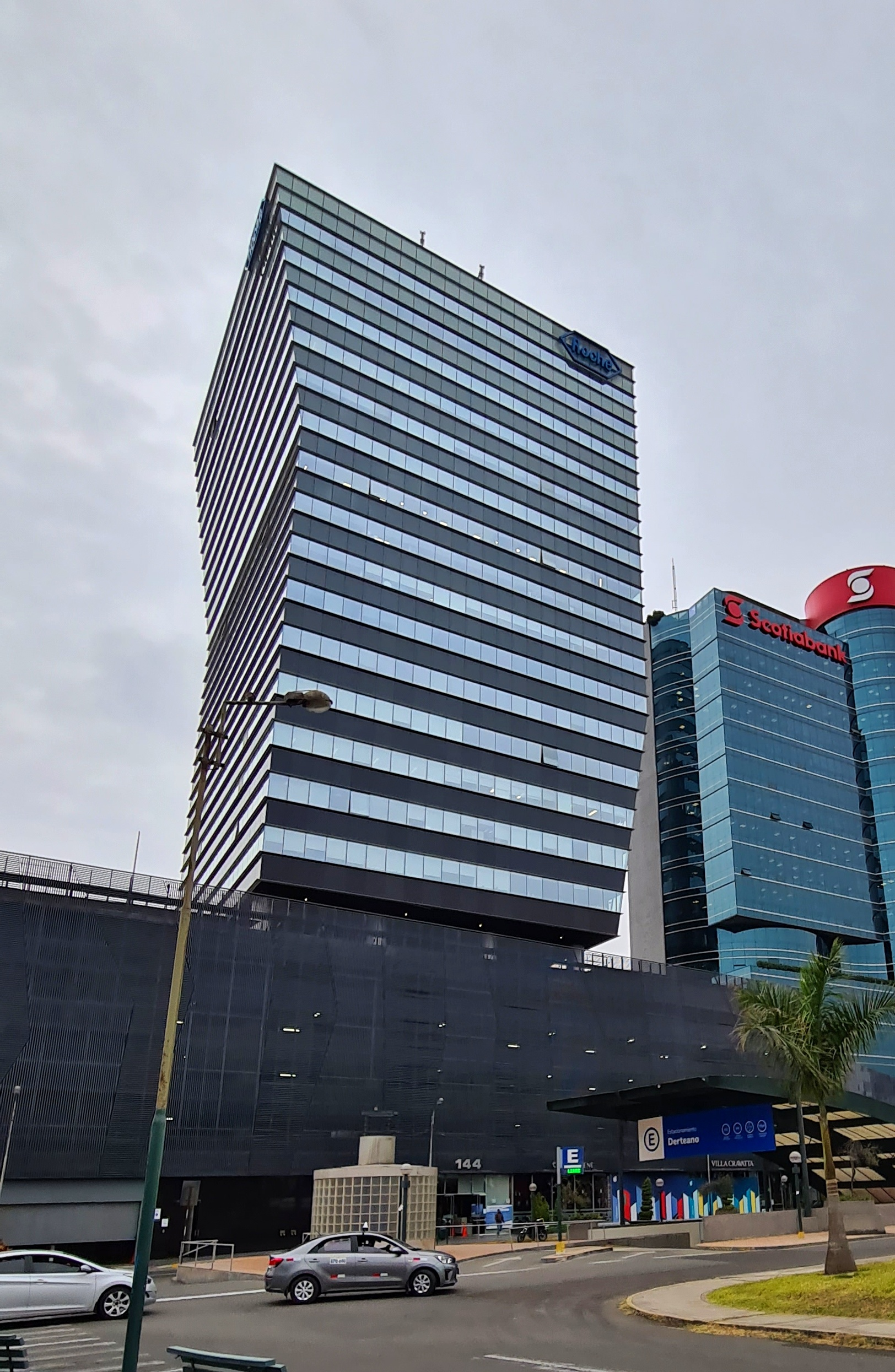
Building hosting the Embassy of Germany in Lima

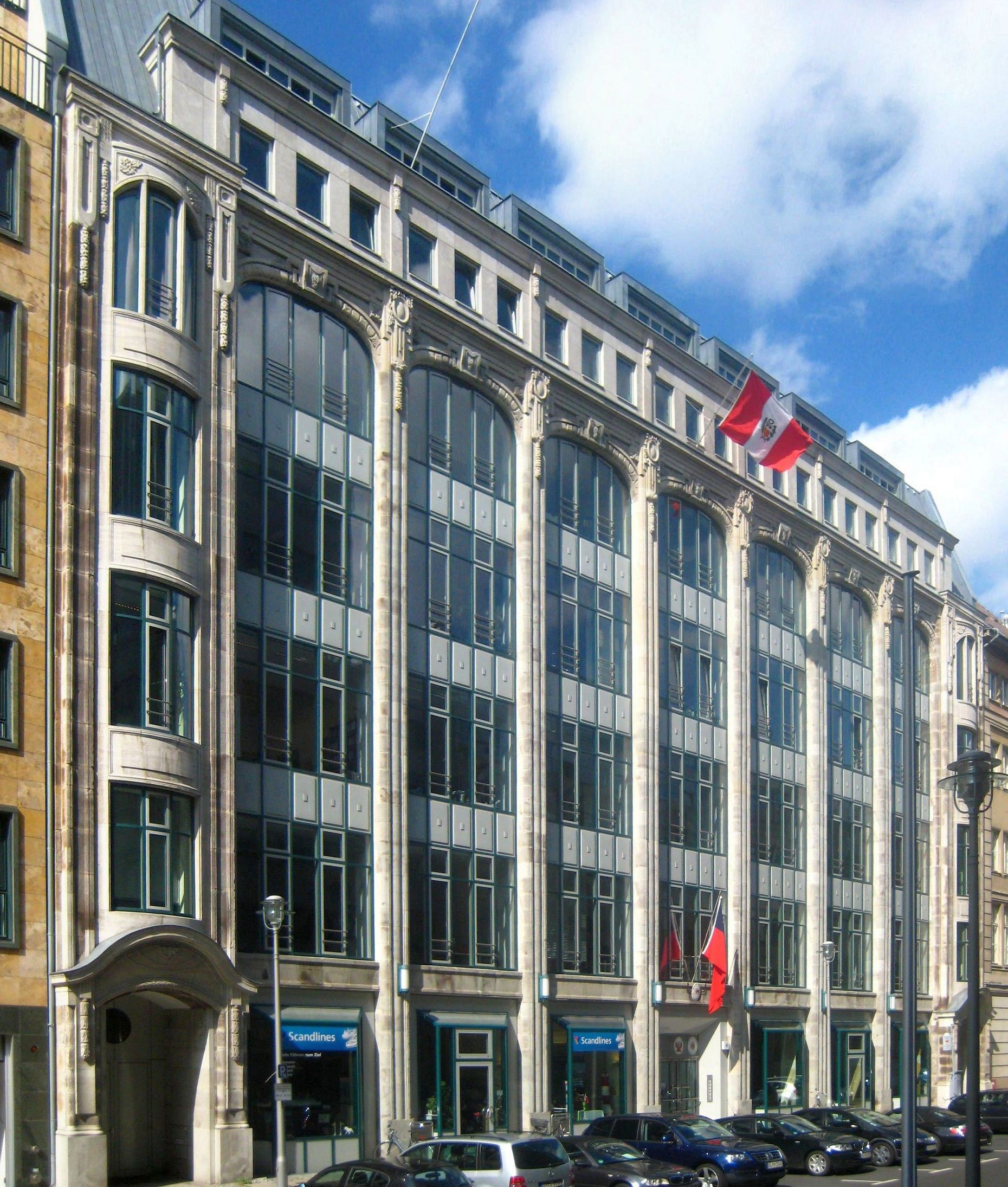
Embassy of Peru in Berlin

== See also ==
- Foreign relations of Germany
- Foreign relations of Peru
- German Peruvians
- List of ambassadors of Peru to Germany
- List of ambassadors of Germany to Peru
