= List of ambassadors of Germany to Peru =

Ambassador of Germany to Peru
- Deutschen Botschafter in Peru
- Incumbent; Sabine Bloch since 2022
- Style: Ambassador Extraordinary and Plenipotentiary
- Seat: Embassy of Germany, Lima
- Abolished: 1990 (East Germany)

The Extraordinary and Plenipotentiary Ambassador of the Federal Republic of Germany in Peru is the official representative of the Federal Republic of Germany to the Republic of Peru.

== History ==
Peru officially established bilateral relations with modern Germany's predecessors in 1828, among them the North German Confederation in 1870 (which was succeeded by the German Empire) and have since maintained diplomatic relations with two exceptions where Peru has severed its relations: in October 1917, as a result of World War I (later reestablished in 1921) and January 26, 1942, as a result of the German declaration of war against the United States during World War II.

After the Second World War, relations were reestablished in 1951, with the Federal Republic of Germany. After the 1968 Peruvian coup d'état and the establishment of Juan Velasco Alvarado's Revolutionary Government, relations with the German Democratic Republic were also established on December 28, 1972. Following German reunification in 1990, relations continued to be maintained with the Federal Government of Germany.

== List of representatives ==
Name	Title	Term begin	Term end	Head of state	Notes
Representatives of the North North German Confederation (1868–1871)
Theodor Müller	GT	1868	1869	Wilhelm I	
Theodor von Bunsen	GT	1870	1871	Wilhelm I	
Representatives of the German Reich (1871–1942)
Theodor von Bunsen	GT	1871	1872	Wilhelm I	
Johannes Lührsen	GT	1873	1879	Wilhelm I	
Anton Daniel von Gramatzki	MR	1879	1882	Wilhelm I	In office during the War of the Pacific.
Hermann Albert Schumacher	MR	1882	1886	Wilhelm I	
Otto Gustav Zembsch	MR	1886	1901	Wilhelm I	As resident minister.
Gustav Christian Michahelles	AGbM	1901	1910	Wilhelm II	
Wilhelm von Hacke	AGbM	1910	1914	Wilhelm II	
Wilfried von Vietinghoff	AGbM	1914	1916	Wilhelm II	
Friedrich (Federico) Perl	AGbM	1916	1917	Wilhelm II	Last representative before World War I.
Represented by Spain (Diplomatic relations severed on October 8, 1917; resumed on January 7, 1921)
Hans Paul von Humboldt-Dachroeden	AGbM	1921	1924	Friedrich Ebert	
Heinrich Rohland	AGbM	1924	1934	Friedrich Ebert	As minister resident.
Ernst Schmitt	AGbM	1934	1938	Adolf Hitler	
Willy Noebel	AGbM	1938	1942	Adolf Hitler	Last representative before World War II.
Represented by Spain (Diplomatic relations severed on January 26, 1942; resumed with the FRG in 1951 and with the GDR in 1972)
Representatives of the German Democratic Republic (1972–1990)
Edgar Fries	AGbB	1973	1975	Erich Honecker	
Dieter Kulitzka	AGbB	1975	1975	Erich Honecker	
Gerhard Witten	AGbB	1975	1980	Erich Honecker	
Arthur Höltge	AGbB	1980	1985	Erich Honecker	
Klaus Hartmann	AGbB	1985	1990	Erich Honecker	
1990: German reunification; relations continued with the Federal Republic of Germany
Representatives of the Federal Republic of Germany (1952–present)
Wilhelm Mackeben	AGbB	1952	1955	Theodor Heuss	Minister from 1952 to 1953.
Josef Fischer	AGbB	1955	1958	Theodor Heuss	
Walter Zimmermann	AGbB	1959	1961	Heinrich Lübke	
Heinrich Northe	AGbB	1961	1967	Heinrich Lübke	
Robert von Förster	AGbB	1967	1973	Heinrich Lübke	
Norbert Berger	AGbB	1973	1978	Gustav Heinemann	
Hans-Werner Loeck	AGbB	1978	1982	Walter Scheel	
Hans-Joachim Hille	AGbB	1982	1986	Karl Carstens	
Johannes von Vacano	AGbB	1986	1991	Richard von Weizsäcker	
Franz von Mentzingen	AGbB	1991	1994	Richard von Weizsäcker	
Heribert Wöckel	AGbB	1994	1997	Richard von Weizsäcker	He was one of the hostages during the Japanese embassy hostage crisis.
Herbert Beyer	AGbB	1997	2002	Roman Herzog	He was the target of a kidnapping attempt in 1998.
Roland Kliesow	AGbB	2002	2006	Johannes Rau	
Christoph Müller	AGbB	2006	2011	Horst Köhler	
Joachim Schmillen	AGbB	2011	2014	Christian Wulff	
Jörg Ranau	AGbB	2014	2018	Joachim Gauck	
Stefan Herzberg	AGbB	2018	2022	Frank-Walter Steinmeier	
Sabine Bloch	AGbB	2022	Incumbent	Frank-Walter Steinmeier	

== See also ==
- List of ambassadors of Peru to Germany
- Embassy of Germany, Lima
