= Peru–Spain relations =

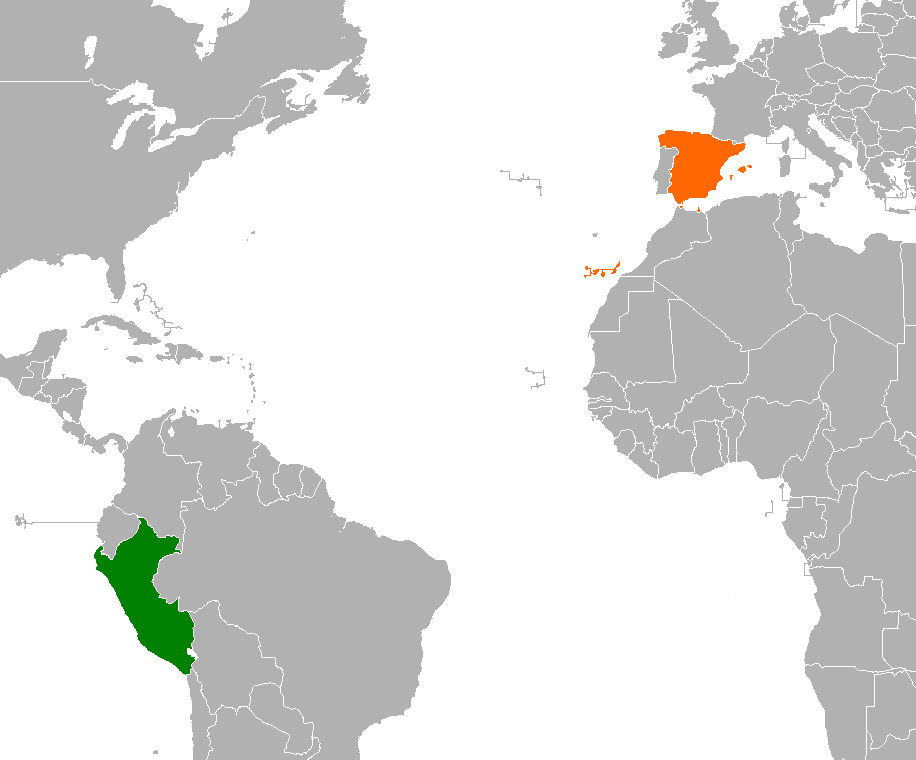
- Peru: Spain

Diplomatic mission
- Embassy of Peru, Madrid: Embassy of Spain, Lima

The Republic of Peru and the Kingdom of Spain maintain foreign, diplomatic and historical ties. Both nations are members of the Association of Academies of the Spanish Language, Organization of Ibero-American States, the Latin Union and the United Nations.

== History ==
=== Spanish conquest ===
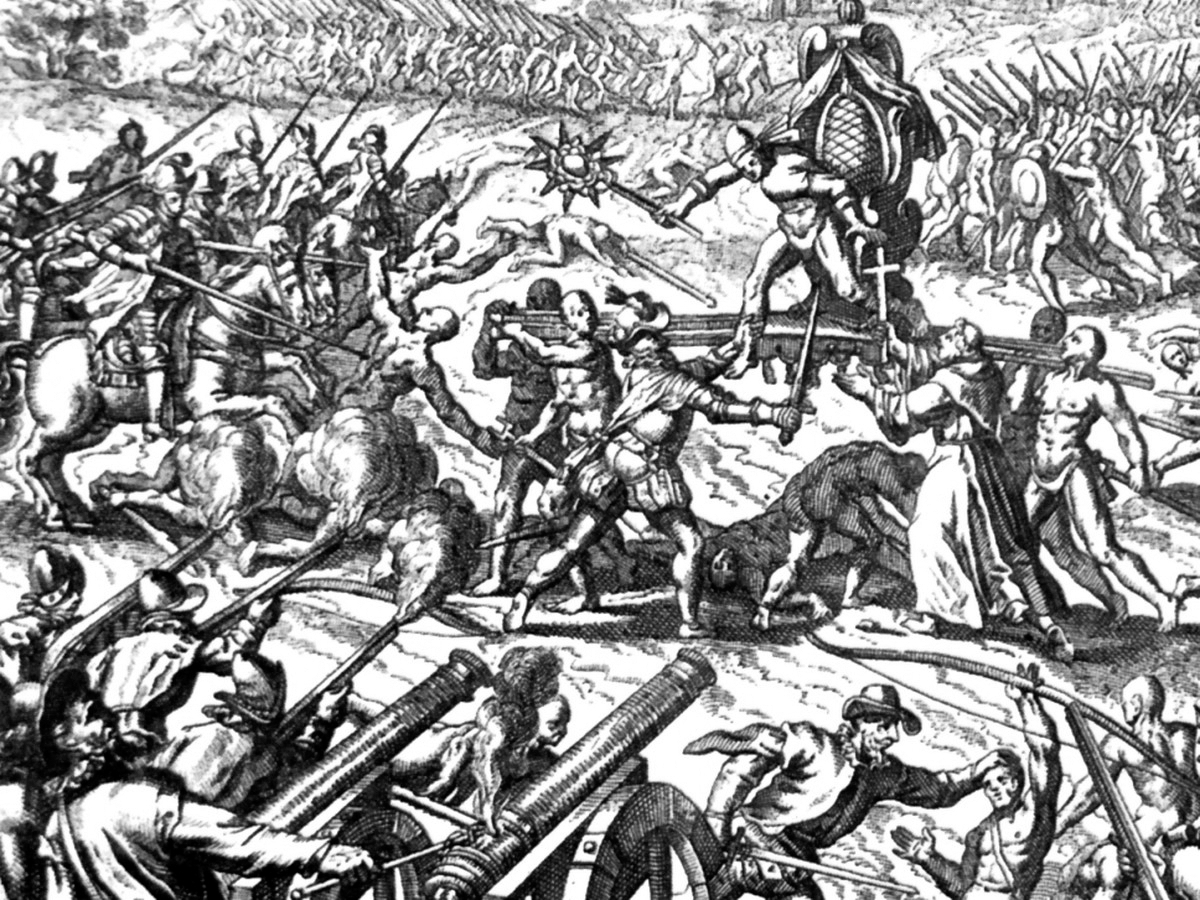
Incan Emperor Atahualpa during the Battle of Cajamarca.

Peru and Spain share a long history since the arrival of the first Spanish conquistadores led by Francisco Pizarro in 1532. In 1534, the Spanish and the Indian auxiliaries succeeded in overcoming the Inca Empire (which stretched from present-day Ecuador, Peru, Bolivia, Chile, and Argentina) and claimed the territory for Spain. In 1535, Spain founded the city of Lima, which would become the seat of power and the capital of the Viceroyalty of Peru from 1542, and at its maximum expansion incorporated most of the nations of South America. The viceroyalty was made up of all the indigenous nobles, that is, all the descendants of the Inca nobility and the royal panakas. Those indigenous descendants of the great coastal and Andean macro-ethnic groups were also recognized nobles.

In the early 1780s, local highland indigenous peoples engaged in widespread uprisings, most notably the Rebellion of Tupac Amaru II, hoping to restore the incanate. However, the revolts were defeated by Spanish troops.

=== Independence ===
Like many Latin-American nations in the early 19th century, Peru experienced a wave of awareness and possibility of independence from Spain. However, unlike most Latin American nations, Peru's independence was conducted primarily by outsiders. On 28 July 1821, José de San Martín declared the independence of Peru. It wouldn't be until December 1824 when the forces of Simón Bolívar entered Peru and the country fully obtained its independence.

=== Post Independence ===
In 1864, Peru, along with Bolivia, Chile, and Ecuador, declared war on Spain when Spanish forces occupied the Guano rich Chincha Islands just off the coast of Peru. The Chincha Islands War lasted until 1866 after the Battle of Callao when Spanish forces bombarded the port city and returned to Spain. In August 1879, Spain officially recognized the independence of Peru and representatives of both nations signed a Treaty of Peace and Friendship in Paris and therefore establishing diplomatic relations.

During the Spanish Civil War (1936-1939), the Peruvian embassy in Madrid was host to over 370 Spanish asylum seekers and Peruvian nationals trying to leave the country. Because the embassy was hosting Spanish nationals, government forces stationed soldiers at the entrance of the Peruvian embassy and consulate to ensure that they would capture any Spanish nationals trying to flee from the embassy. As a result, the Peruvian government issued a letter denouncing the government and their tactics. Due to the tense relationship between the two nations during this time period, Peru and Spain severed diplomatic relations in March 1938, however, once General Francisco Franco took power, both nations re-established diplomatic relations in February 1939. In June 1939, both nations re-opened their embassies in each other's capitals, respectively.

In 1949, the Spanish government donated the Palacio de la Trinidad to Peru to host its embassy, while the latter donated a 10,000 m^{2} terrain in the southeastern corner of El Campo de Marte in reciprocity. In 1969, both areas were returned to their original countries.

Over the years, both Peru and Spain have signed numerous agreements such as: agreements on air transport and trade relations (1954); agreement on dual citizenship (1959); social security agreement (1964) and cultural cooperation (1967).

In November 1978, Spanish King Juan Carlos I paid an official visit to Peru, his first to the country. Since then, members of the Spanish royal family and government officials would visit Peru on numerous occasions. In 1991, Peruvian President, Alberto Fujimori, paid an official state visit to Spain, the first by a Peruvian head of state.

In May 2018, Peru promoted the bilateral relationship with Spain. In November of the same year, the Spanish Kings, Felipe VI and Letizia Ortiz, met with the Peruvian President, Martín Vizcarra, and his wife, Maribel Díaz, beginning a state visit in which both countries strengthened their relations with a full schedule of contacts institutional, economic, social, defense and cultural. Both leaders expressed the desire to try a joint rapprochement in relations between the two countries. The Spanish king received from the hands of the head of state the medal of Order of Merit for Distinguished Services in the degree of Special Grand Cross. Likewise, Vizcarra affirmed Spanish support for Peru's accession to the OECD.

In 2021, the Peruvian president, Pedro Castillo, criticized the Spanish presence in Peru at his inauguration. Although an opposition deputy of the Congress of Peru, Carlos Lizarzaburu, sent a letter apologizing to King Felipe VI for the president's insults during his inauguration, criticizing the Peruvian president for his profound ignorance of the history that unites both nations and the existing relations between mutual support dating back two centuries. In 2022, Spain was one of the countries that condemned the "rupture of the constitutional order" caused by Castillo in Peru. Later, Spain congratulated the subsequent "restoration of democratic normality" after the Peruvian Congress approved, in extraordinary session, a motion of censure against Castillo for moral incapacity. Likewise, in January 2023, Spain asked to resolve the Peruvian political crisis through "constitutional channels".

== High-level visits ==
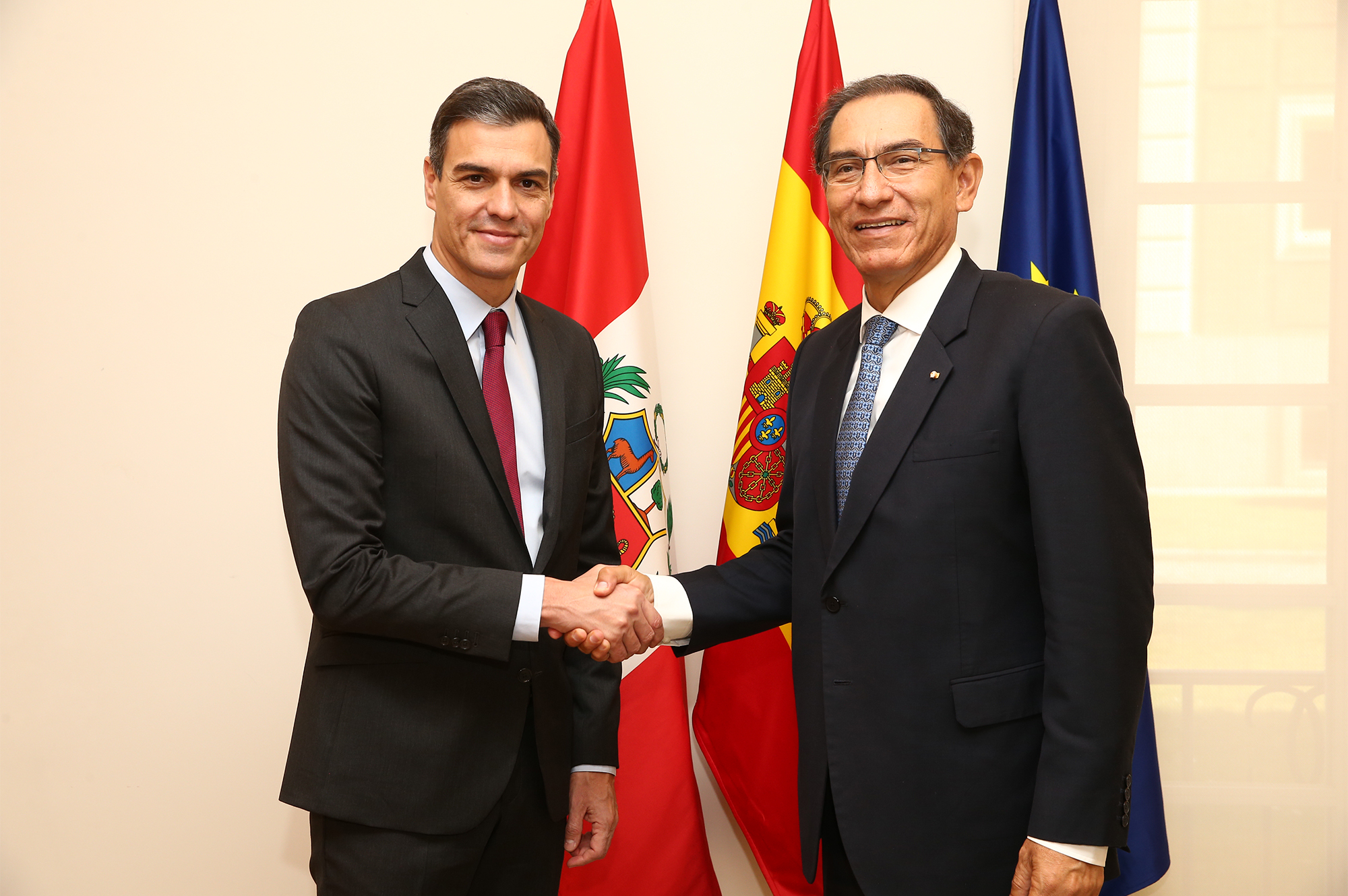
Peruvian President Martín Vizcarra and Spanish Prime Minister Pedro Sánchez in Madrid, 2019.

High-level visit from Peru to Spain

- President Alan García (1987, 2008, 2009)
- President Alberto Fujimori (1991)
- President Alejandro Toledo (2004, 2005)
- President Ollanta Humala (2012, 2016)
- President Pedro Pablo Kuczynski (2017)
- President Martín Vizcarra (2019)

High-level visit from Spain to Peru

- King Juan Carlos I (1978, 2001, 2008)
- Queen Sofía (1978)
- Prime Minister Adolfo Suárez (1980)
- Prime Minister Leopoldo Calvo-Sotelo (1982)
- Prime Minister Felipe González (1986)
- Prime Minister José María Aznar (2001)
- Prime Minister José Luis Rodríguez Zapatero (2008)
- Prime Minister Mariano Rajoy (2013)
- King Felipe VI (2018, 2021, 2025, 2026)
- Queen Letizia (2018)

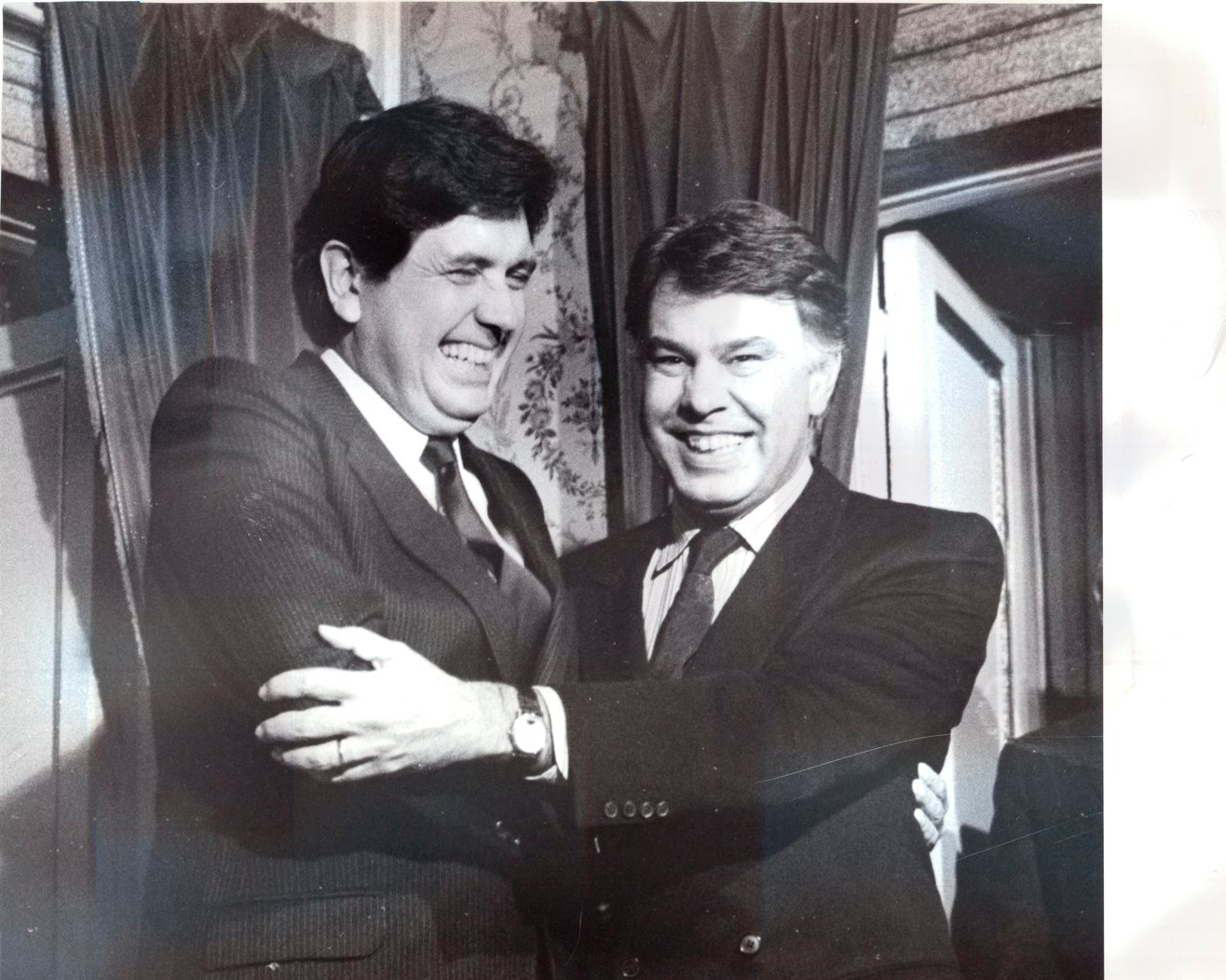
President Alan García and Prime Minister Felipe González in Madrid; January 1987.

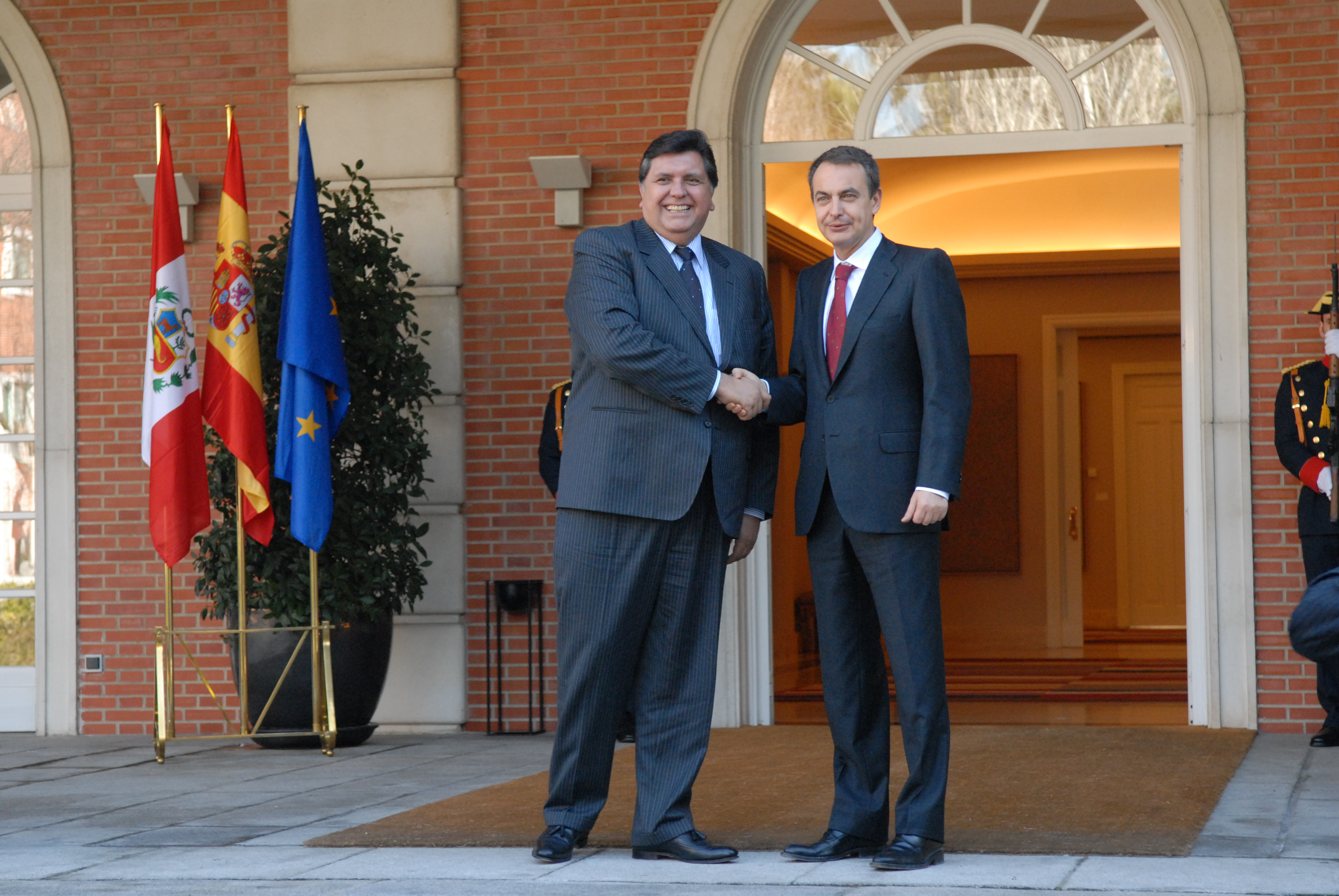
President Alan García and Prime Minister José Luis Rodríguez Zapatero in Madrid; 2008.

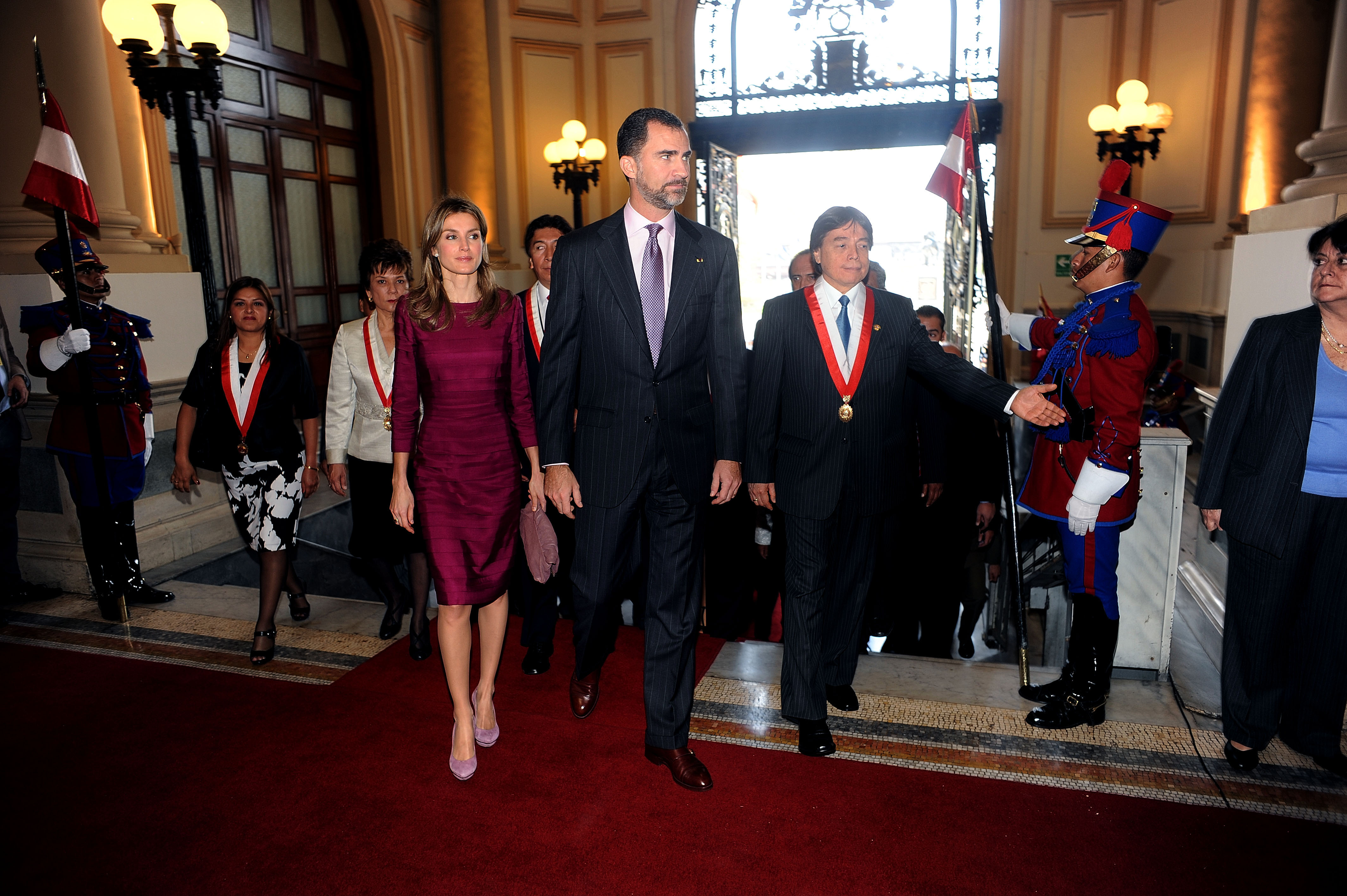
Then Prince of Asturias Felipe and Princess Letizia in Lima; 2010.

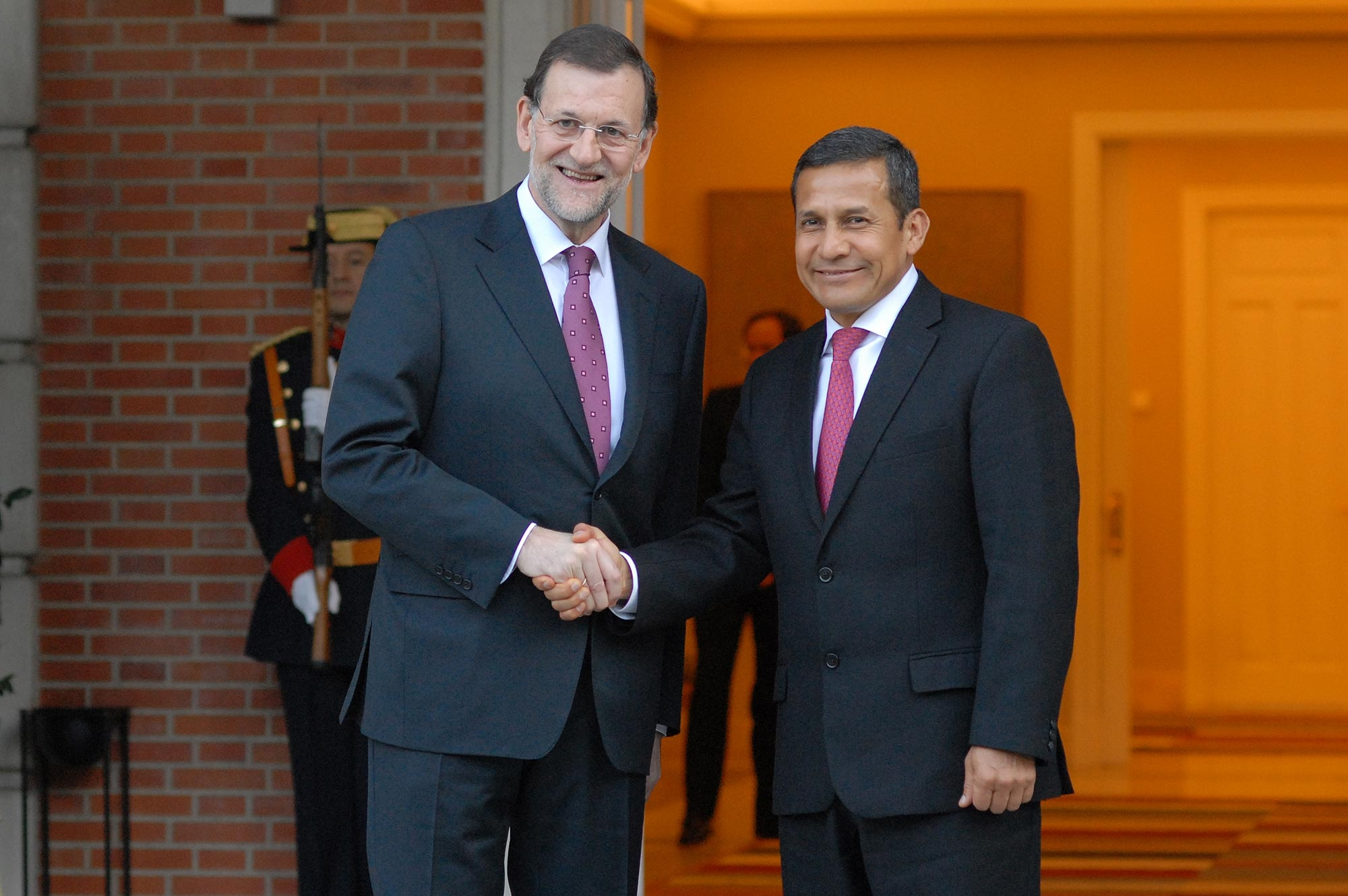
Prime Minister Mariano Rajoy and President Ollanta Humala in Madrid; 2012.

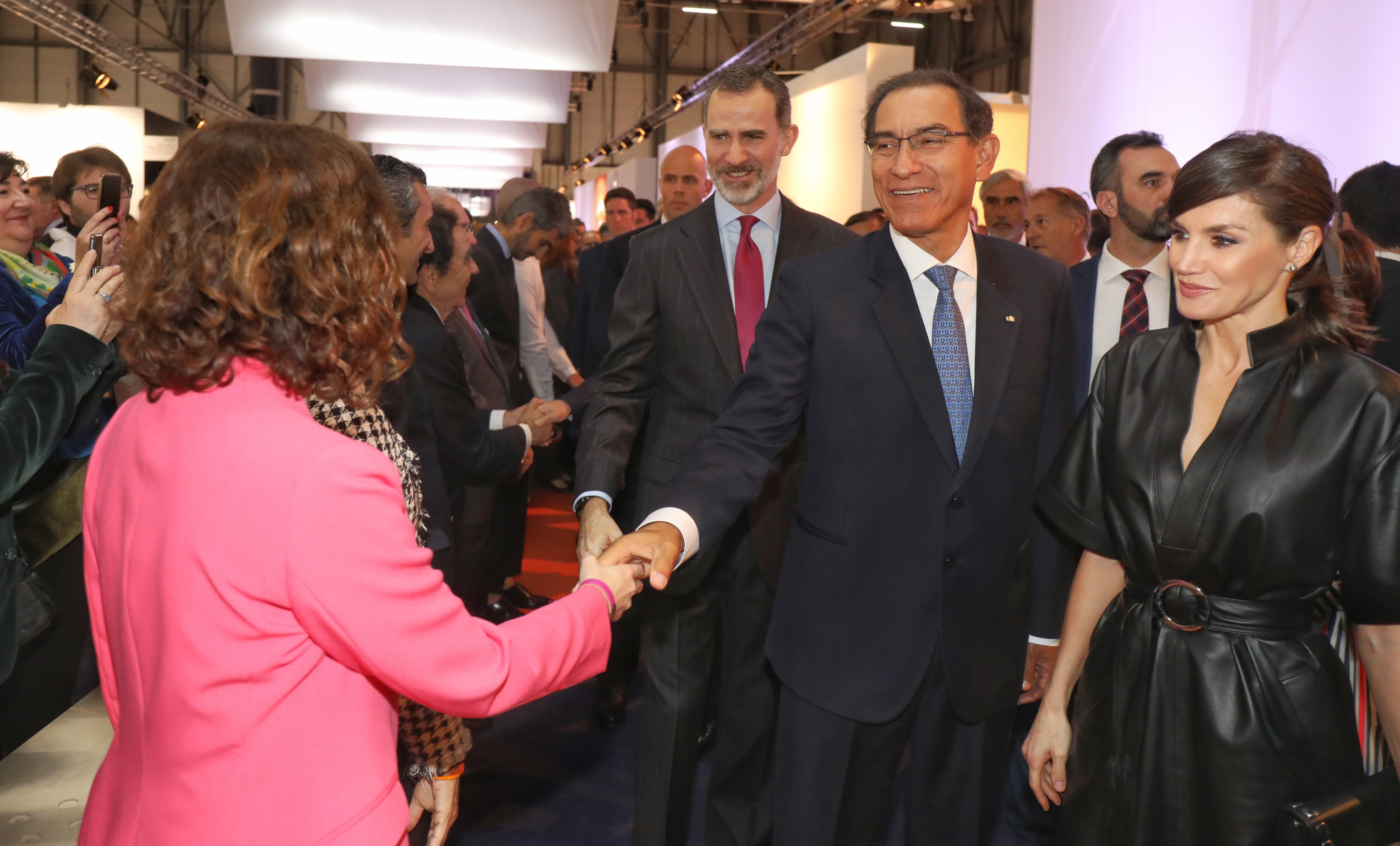
King Felipe VI and President Martín Vizcarra in Madrid; 2019.

== Cultural cooperation ==
Peru hosts a Spanish Cultural Center in Lima. In October 2021, the start of the file for twinning was established between the cities of Córdoba (Spain) and Cusco (Peru), based on the relationship as part of the World Heritage and also united by the figure of Inca Garcilaso de la Vega, promoting collaboration and the exchange of experiences in areas such as education, tourism, culture or economy, for the benefit of all its citizens.

In July 2022, the Peruvian ambassador to Spain, Óscar Maúrtua, announced that the Peruvian embassy is working on the opening of a "Peru House" in Madrid, as well as the construction of a replica of the "Chavín Stele" in Chamartín district. Likewise, the Peruvian consul in Madrid, Elizabeth González, stressed that relations between the two countries "have always been very good" and that they "continue to be", both because of the historical elements that unite both countries, and because of the cultural richness. Subsequently, Maúrtua argued that Spain and Peru are united by strong historical-cultural ties, developed over five centuries of shared traditions: architecture, painting, literature or gastronomy, under the richness of the Spanish language, and that both countries are recognized as strategic allies for the future. In addition, on the occasion of the 201 years of independence of the South American country, the Peruvian Foreign Minister, César Landa, stated that Peru recognizes Spain as the main "strategic and reliable ally" in the EU, highlighting the strong historical-cultural ties and the "excellent" economic relationship.

In April 2023, France, Italy, Poland, and Peru founded the Consular Corps of Castile and León (Spain). The association of accredited consulates in Spain based in the capitals of the Community will promote cultural, scientific, academic, economic and tourist exchange between the Region and the countries represented.

== Trade ==
In 2024, trade between both Peru and Spain totaled €2.3 billion Euros. Peru's main exports to Spain include: copper, zinc, frozen crustaceans and sea mussels, fruits and vegetables. Spain main exports to Peru include: machinery, electrical equipment, construction machinery equipment and steel. Spanish multinational companies such as Banco Bilbao Vizcaya Argentaria, Banco Santander, Mapfre, Telefónica, and Zara operate in Peru. In 2011, Peru signed a free trade agreement with the EU (which includes Spain).

== Transportation ==
There are direct flights between both nations with the following airlines: Air Europa, Iberia, LATAM Perú, and Plus Ultra Líneas Aéreas.

== Resident diplomatic missions ==
of Peru in Spain

- Madrid (Embassy)
- Madrid (Consulate-General)
- Barcelona (Consulate-General)
- Bilbao (Consulate-General)
- Seville (Consulate-General)
- Valencia (Consulate-General)

of Spain in Peru

- Lima (Embassy)
- Lima (Consulate-General)

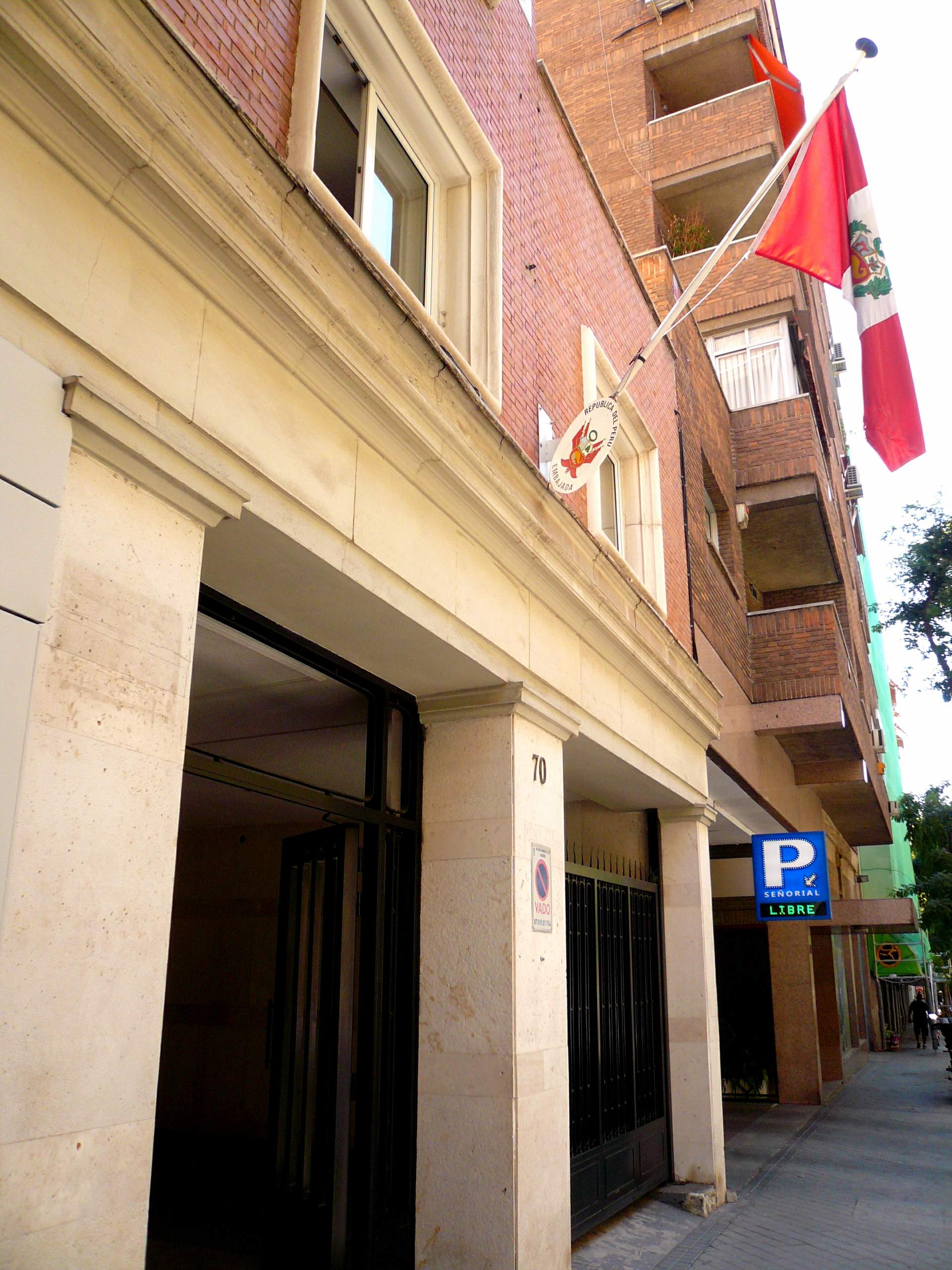
Embassy of Peru in Madrid

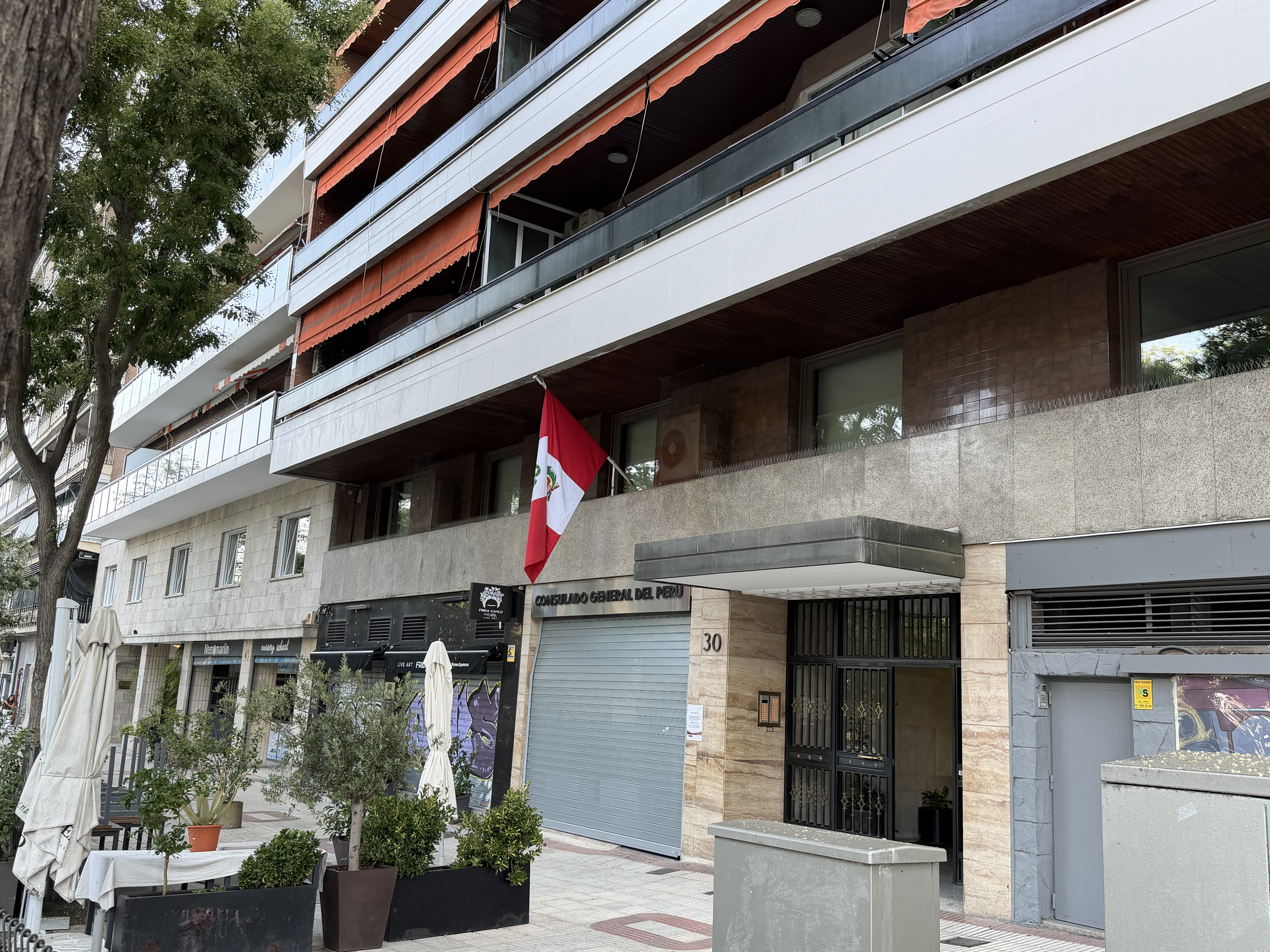
Consulate-General in Madrid

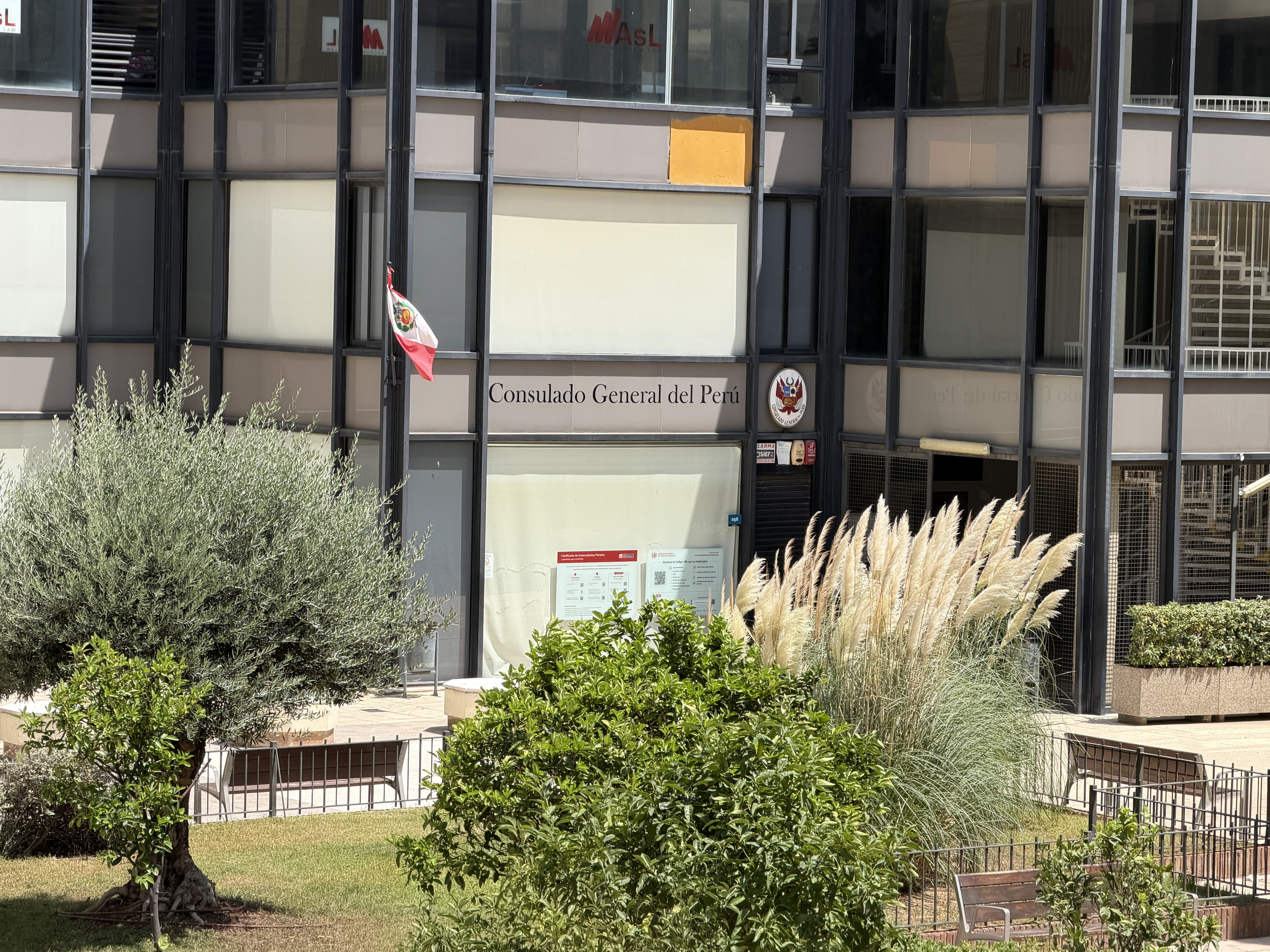
Consulate-General of Peru in Barcelona

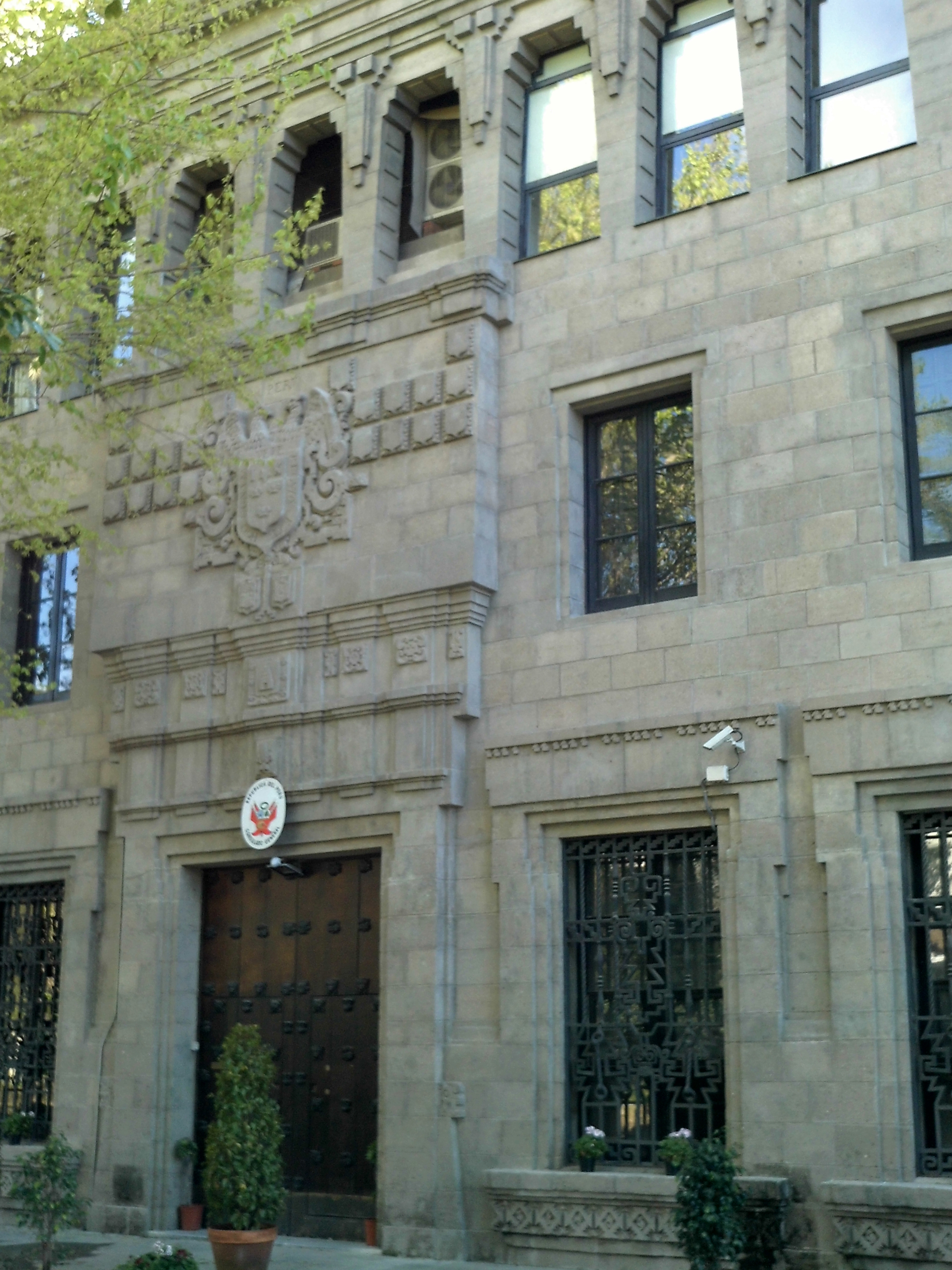
Consulate-General of Peru in Seville
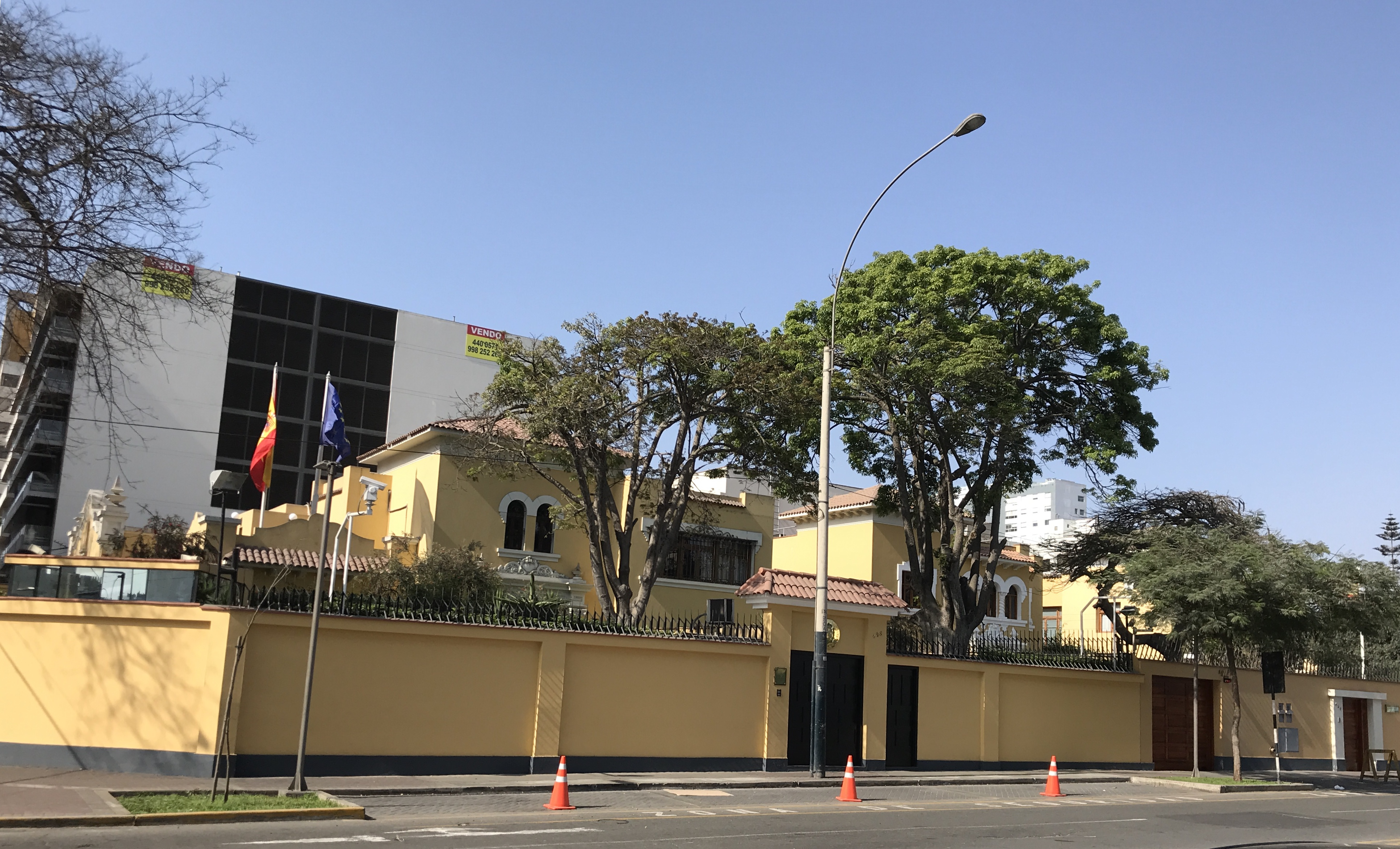
Embassy of Spain in Lima

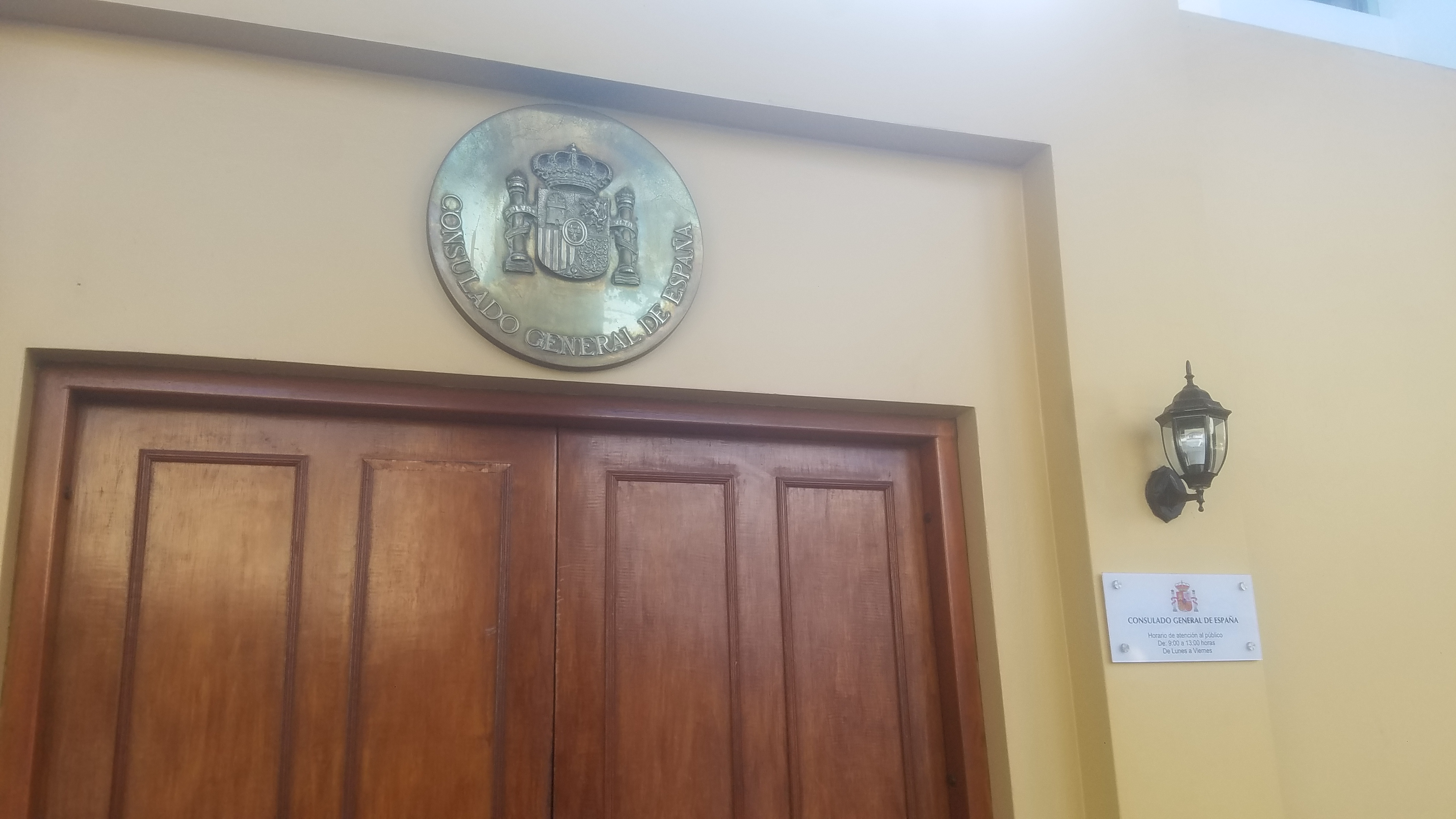
Consulate-General of Spain in Lima

== See also ==
- Peruvians in Spain
- Spanish immigration to Peru
- List of ambassadors of Peru to Spain
- List of ambassadors of Spain to Peru
