= Palacio de la Trinidad =

Palace in Spain

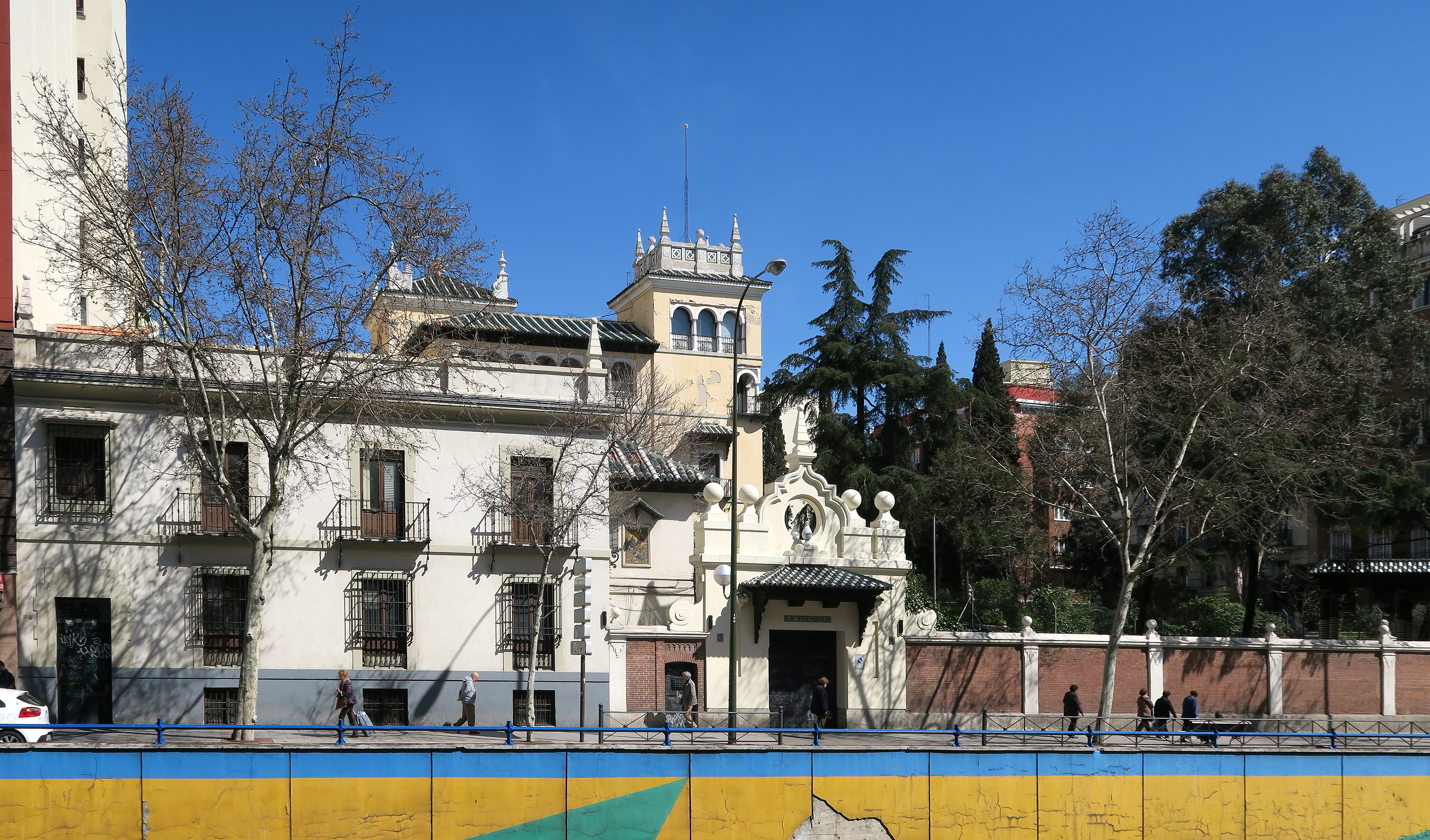
- Interactive map of the Palacio de la Trinidad area

General information
- Location: Francisco Silvela 82
- Coordinates: 40°26′14″N 3°40′35″W
- Year built: 1928
- Owner: Pescaderías Coruñesas

The Palace of Trinity (Spanish: Palacio de la Trinidad) is a palace in Madrid, Spain that depends on the Directorate-General for State Heritage, itself depending on the Ministry of Finance.

== History ==
It was built in 1928 by the architect Luis Alemany Soler, who two decades later would build—together with Manuel Muñoz Monasterio—the Santiago Bernabéu Stadium. The building was property of the State and has been the headquarters of the State Secretariat for Foreign Policy, and also the headquarters of the Spanish Confederation of Business Organizations (CEOE).

In 1949, the Spanish government donated the palace to Peru to host its embassy, while the latter donated a 10,000 m^{2} terrain in the southeastern corner of El Campo de Marte in reciprocity. In 1969, both areas were returned to their original countries.

During the Spanish transition it was the headquarters of the Ministry of Governance of the government of the Union of the Democratic Centre (between 1976 and 1979), and later, from 1979 to 2006, it was the headquarters of the Cervantes Institute.

Since 2011, the facilities were empty and needed a major restoration process, which led to it being put up for sale at public auction in 2014, being acquired by Pescaderías Coruñesas for around € 6.6 million. In 2020, the ABC reported about the new uses that the Palace would have. It also explains that Pescaderías Coruñesas acquired it in 2015 for € 1.5 million, given its deterioration; although the initial auction price was € 6.4 million.

== See also ==
- Embassy of Peru, Madrid
