= List of ambassadors of Spain to Peru =

Ambassador of Spain to Peru
- Coat of Arms of Spain
- Ministry of Foreign Affairs; Av. Jorge Basadre 498, Lima
- Style: His Excellency
- Appointer: The Monarch
- Website: Official Website

The extraordinary and plenipotentiary ambassador of the Kingdom of Spain to the Republic of Peru is the official representative of the Spain to Peru.

Peru and Spain officially established relations on August 15, 1879, under Alfonso XII and have since maintained diplomatic relations with a brief exception during the years 1936 to 1939 as a result of the Spanish Civil War.

== List of representatives ==
Name	Portrait	Term begin	Term end	Head of state	Notes
Vicente Galarza y Zuloaga		July 21, 1891	?	Alfonso XIII	As minister plenipotentiary.
Emilio de Ojeda		1892	1894	Alfonso XIII	
Luis del Castillo y Trigueros		1895	1895	Alfonso XIII	As envoy extraordinary and minister plenipotentiary.
Julio de Arellano		1896	1898	Alfonso XIII	Legation of Spain in Lima, Sucre and Quito.
Ramiro Gil de Uribarri		1899	1904	Alfonso XIII	Legation of Spain in Lima, Sucre and Quito.
Manuel Pastor y Bedoya		1905	1905	Alfonso XIII	Legation of Spain in Lima, Sucre and Quito.
Ricardo Larios Segura		1906	1907	Alfonso XIII	
Julián María del Arroyo y Moret		1910	1911	Alfonso XIII	
Antonio Jaén Morente		1933	1937	Niceto Alcalá-Zamora	Relations were severed in 1936 due to the Spanish Civil War.
Fernando María Castiella		August 10, 1950	1956	Francisco Franco	As ambassador.
Mariano de Yturralde y Orbegoso		May 1959	1960	Francisco Franco	
Alfonso Merry del Val y Alzola		September 21, 1960	March 16, 1964	Francisco Franco	As ambassador.
Ángel Sanz Briz		March 16, 1965	June 24, 1967	Francisco Franco	
Manuel Alabart Miranda		September 3, 1967	March 18, 1972	Francisco Franco	As ambassador.
Pedro Salvador de Vicente		May 12, 1972	July 30, 1975	Francisco Franco	As ambassador.
José María Moro Martín-Montalbo		July 30, 1975	September 13, 1977	Juan Carlos I	As ambassador.
Juan Ignacio Tena Ybarra		September 13, 1977	February 26, 1982	Juan Carlos I	As ambassador.
Pedro Bermejo Marín		February 26, 1982	?	Juan Carlos I	As ambassador.
José Luis Dicenta		October 16, 1985	May 22, 1988	Juan Carlos I	As ambassador.
Nabor Manuel García García		June 11, 1988	November 22, 1996	Juan Carlos I	As ambassador.
Gonzalo de Benito Secades		November 22, 1996	2000	Juan Carlos I	As ambassador.
Carlos Díaz Valcárcel		2000	July 24, 2004	Juan Carlos I	As ambassador.
Julio Albi de la Cuesta		July 24, 2004	June 13, 2008	Juan Carlos I	As ambassador.
Francisco Javier Sandomingo		June 13, 2008	October 14, 2011	Juan Carlos I	As ambassador.
Juan Carlos Sánchez Alonso		October 14, 2011	?	Juan Carlos I	As ambassador. He presented his credentials on January 10, 2012.
Ernesto de Zulueta		June 26, 2015	June 23, 2020	Felipe VI	
Alejandro Alvargonzález San Martín		July 12, 2022	March 24, 2024	Felipe VI	As ambassador.
Alejandro Abellán García de Diego		March 19, 2024	July 28, 2026	As ambassador. Son of historian José Luis Abellán.	

== See also ==
- List of ambassadors of Peru to Spain
