= Embassy of Peru, Berlin =

Embassy of Peru in Berlin
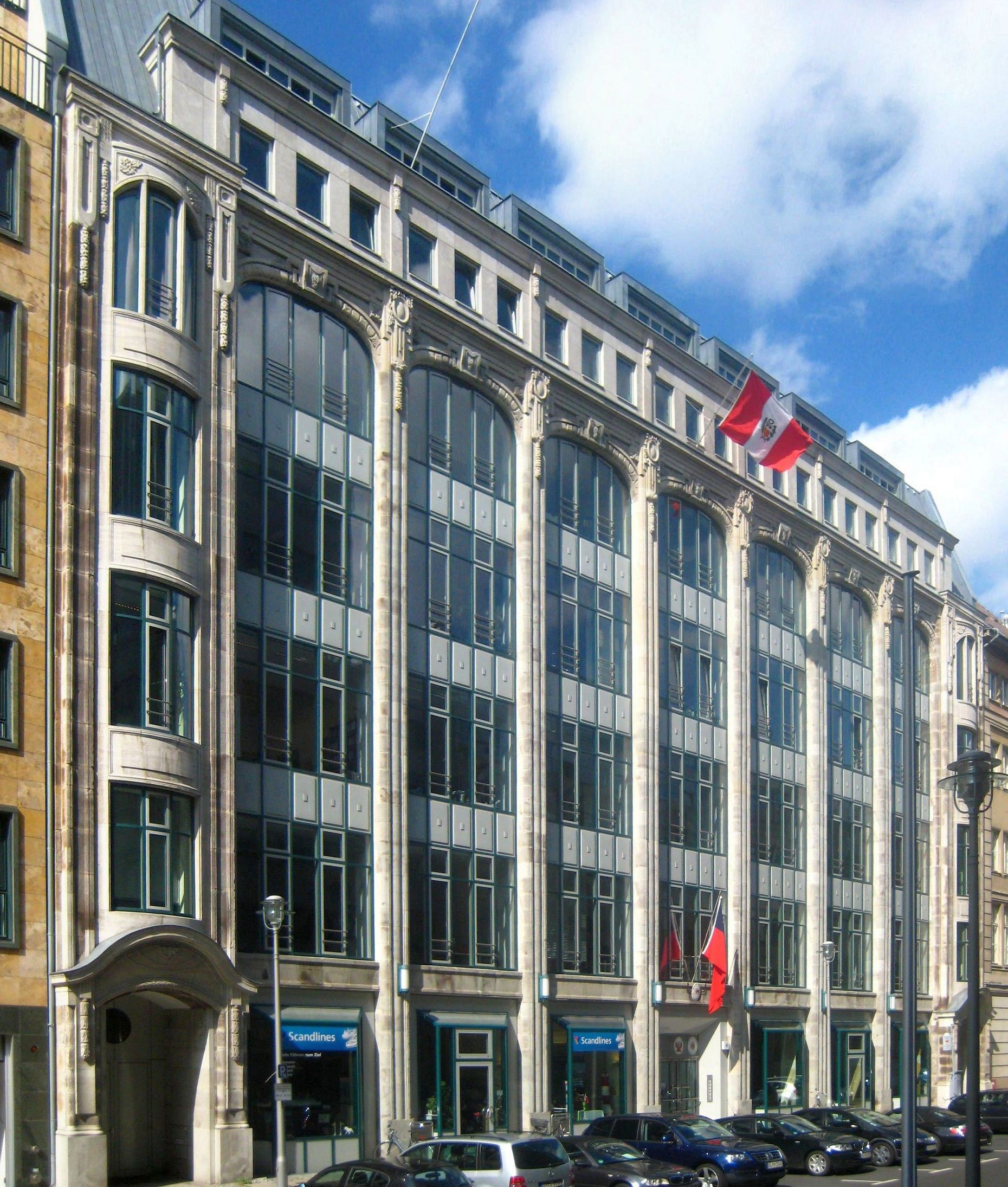
- Ambassador: Augusto Arzubiaga
- Website: Official website

The Embassy of Peru in Berlin is the foremost diplomatic mission of the Republic of Peru in Germany. The embassy is based in Taubenstraße, Berlin-Mitte; the ambassador is Augusto Arzubiaga.

Apart from the embassy in Berlin, Peru also maintains consulates-general in Frankfurt, Hamburg and Munich.

== History ==
As a result of the establishment of consular relations between Peru and the then German Confederation, Peru opened a series of consulates in different states, starting with Hamburg in 1840.

As a result of World War I, Peru severed its relations with the German Empire in 1917, with the Spanish Embassy taking charge of Peruvian interests in Germany until 1920. This situation again took place during World War II with Switzerland now acting as the protecting power of Peru, as the embassy in Berlin closed in February 1942.

=== Embassy in Bonn (1951–2001) ===
After Peru and West Germany normalized relations in 1951, Peru opened a diplomatic mission in Bonn (being preceded by the Hotel Königshof for a short period). Two years later, relations were elevated to embassy level. The embassy's library was targeted in an arson attack in 1987 on the anniversary of the Peruvian prison massacres that took place one year prior off the coast of Callao.

After the reunification of Germany in 1990, the embassy in Bonn remained open until 2001, when it was moved to Berlin under the government of Alejandro Toledo starting on November 1.

=== Embassy in East Berlin (1972–1990) ===
After a coup d'état in 1968 and the establishment of a military government by Juan Velasco Alvarado, relations were established with East Germany in 1972, with Peru opening an embassy in East Berlin. The embassy (also accredited to Bolivia after 1973) was located on Otto-Grotewohl-Straße 5, 108 Berlin-Mitte (in 1984), later being located on Schadowstrasse 6/IV (in 1988). The ambassador was once recalled in 1986 due to an arms smuggling incident.

== See also ==
- Embassy of Germany, Lima

== Bibliography ==
- Novak, Fabián (2012). Las relaciones entre el Perú y Alemania (1828-2012) (in Spanish) (1st ed.). PUCP. ISBN 978-9972-42-634-6. Archived from the original on 2022-10-21.
