= Michael Siegel =

American tobacco control expert and public health researcher

Michael B. Siegel is an American tobacco control researcher and public health researcher. He is a professor of community health sciences at the Boston University School of Public Health.

== Education ==
Siegel completed his residency in preventive medicine at the University of California, Berkeley School of Public Health and trained in epidemiology at the Centers for Disease Control for two years. His former mentor is tobacco-control activist Stanton Glantz.

== Work ==
Siegel is known for his work in the area of tobacco control and the harmful effects of passive smoking. However, in 2007, he published a paper dismissing claims that brief exposure to secondhand smoke increased the risk of heart attacks or presented any other significant cardiovascular risk to nonsmokers. He has been called out for going astray by his former mentor Stanton Glantz who called him "a tragic figure - he has completely lost it," and "his view is that everybody in the tobacco control movement is corrupt and misguided except for him". He also published a study in 2013 that found that in the United States, "states with higher rates of gun ownership had disproportionately large numbers of deaths from firearm-related homicides." He published a similar study the following year, which concluded that "state-level gun ownership...is significantly associated with firearm and total homicides but not with non-firearm homicides." In 2016, he and Emily Rothman published another study that found a "substantial" association between gun ownership rates and the rate at which women died from firearm homicide. In July 2016, he and Rothman published another study that found a strong positive association between gun ownership rates and gun-related suicide rates in the United States. The same study found a strong association between gun ownership rates and overall suicide rates, but only among men. He has also published research about how the soda industry spends millions on health organizations, yet simultaneously lobbies against public health laws intended to reduce consumption of their products.

== Views on electronic cigarettes ==
Siegel has argued that electronic cigarettes could lead to conventional cigarettes becoming obsolete.
