= Luis Arias Graziani =

Peruvian Air Force officer and politician (1926–2020)

Luis Alfonso Arias Graziani (21 April 1926 – 13 July 2020) was a Peruvian air force officer and politician who served as Minister of Defence and Chief of the Joint Command from 1980 to 1981. Graziani had previously served as Minister of Commerce from 1977 to 1978 and Minister of Aeronautics from 1978 to 1980.

He died from COVID-19 during the COVID-19 pandemic in Peru.
