= Embassy of Spain, Lima =

Embassy of Spain in Lima
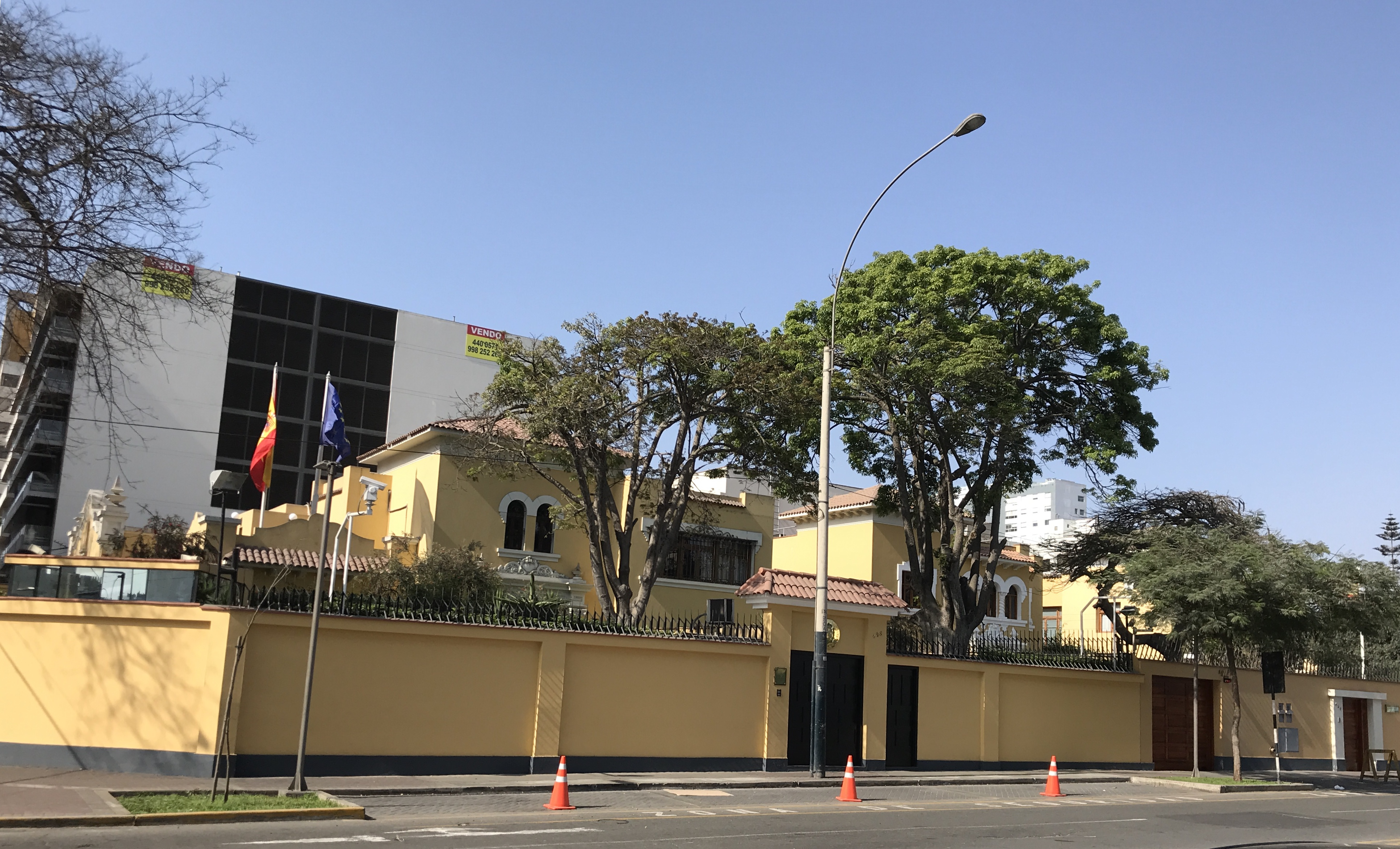
- Ambassador: Alejandro Abellán García de Diego
- Website: Embassy of Spain in Peru

The Embassy of Spain in Lima is the diplomatic mission of Spain in Peru. Its address is Av. Jorge Basadre 498, San Isidro, Lima.

The current Spanish ambassador to Peru is Alejandro Alvargonzález San Martín.

== History ==
Both countries officially established relations on August 15, 1879, under Alfonso XII and have since maintained diplomatic relations with a brief exception during the years 1936 to 1939 as a result of the Spanish Civil War.

During the internal conflict in Peru, like other embassies, the embassy was targeted, as it was affected by a series of embassy bombings that took place on February 21, 1986 and also targeted the Chinese, German, Romanian, Japan, Chilean and Argentine embassies. In 1996, the embassy's chargé d'affaires, Estanislao de Grandes, became one of the hundreds of hostages during the Japanese embassy hostage crisis.

Peru also maintains an Embassy in Madrid, headed by an Ambassador.

=== Residence ===
The residence of the ambassador is located at the Casa Solari de Checa, a house located at the intersection of San Martín Avenue and Sáenz Peña street in Barranco District, commissioned by María Luisa Solari de Checa as her residence and built by Ricardo de Jaxa Malachowski in a Republican style. It was donated to Spain in the 1920s. In 2019, a large tree, which had been reported as crooked since November of 2018, collapsed on top of the house's gate without any injuries to passers-by.

== Gallery ==
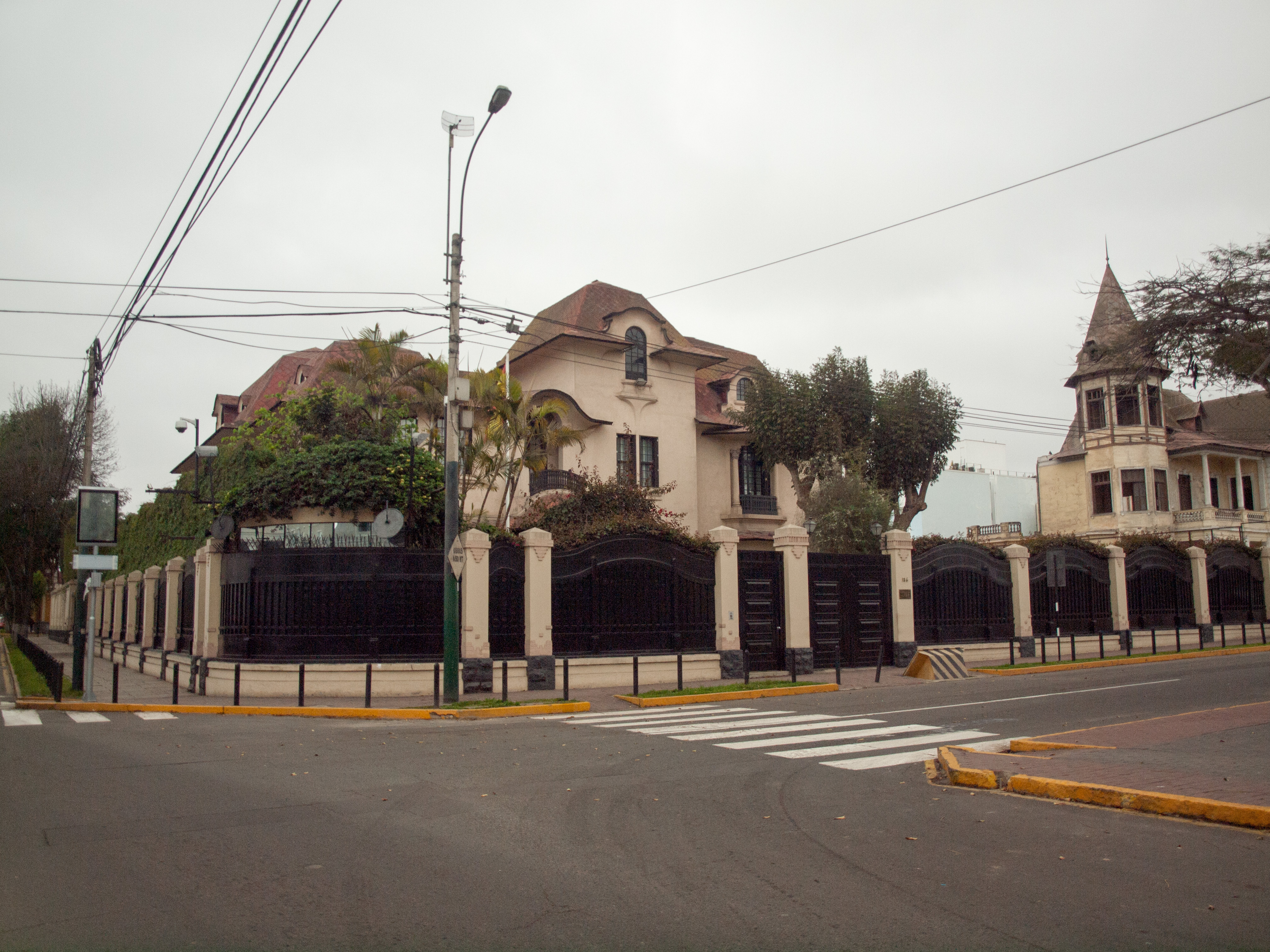
Ambassadorial residence (Barranco)

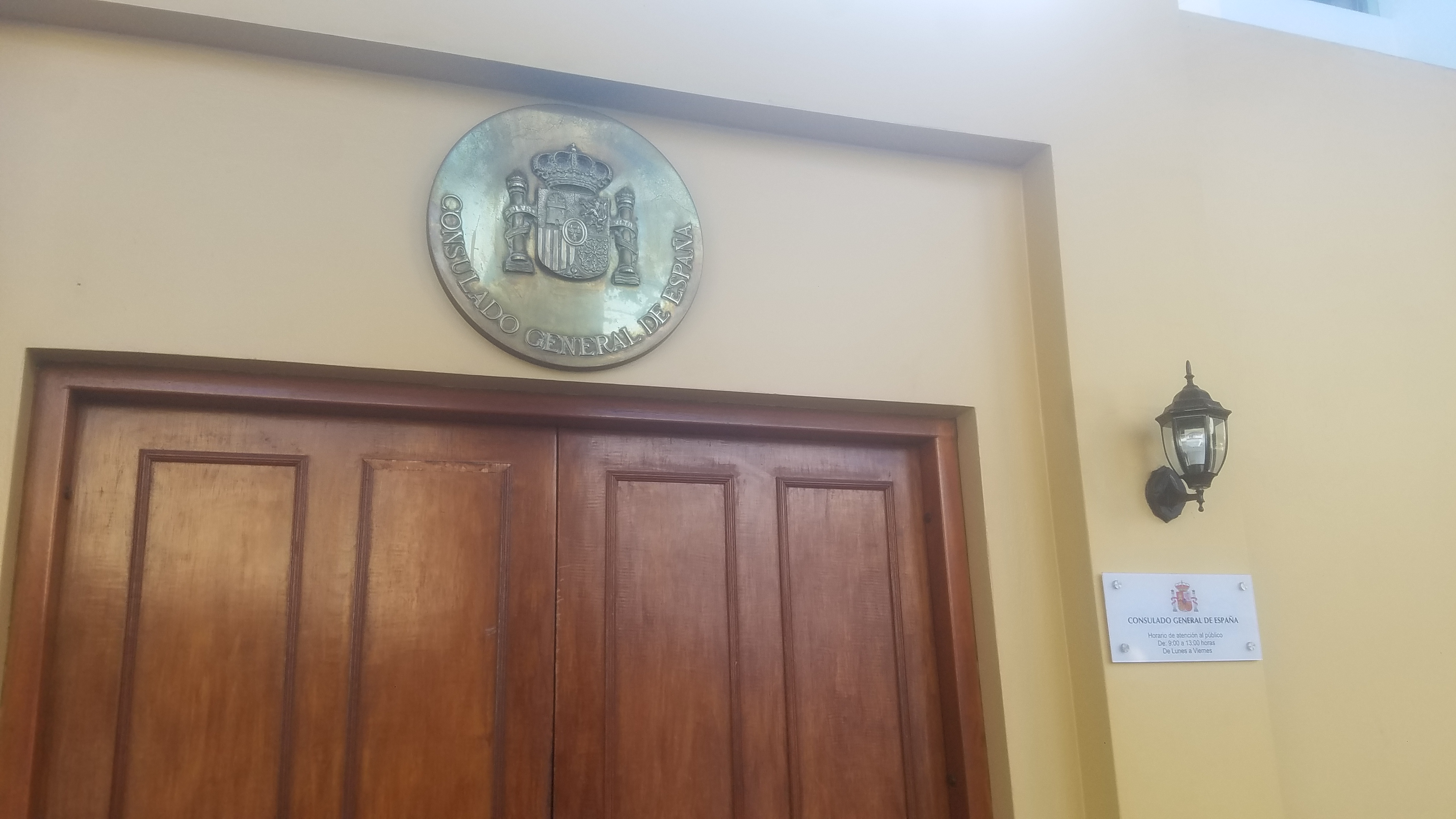
Consulate-General (San Isidro)

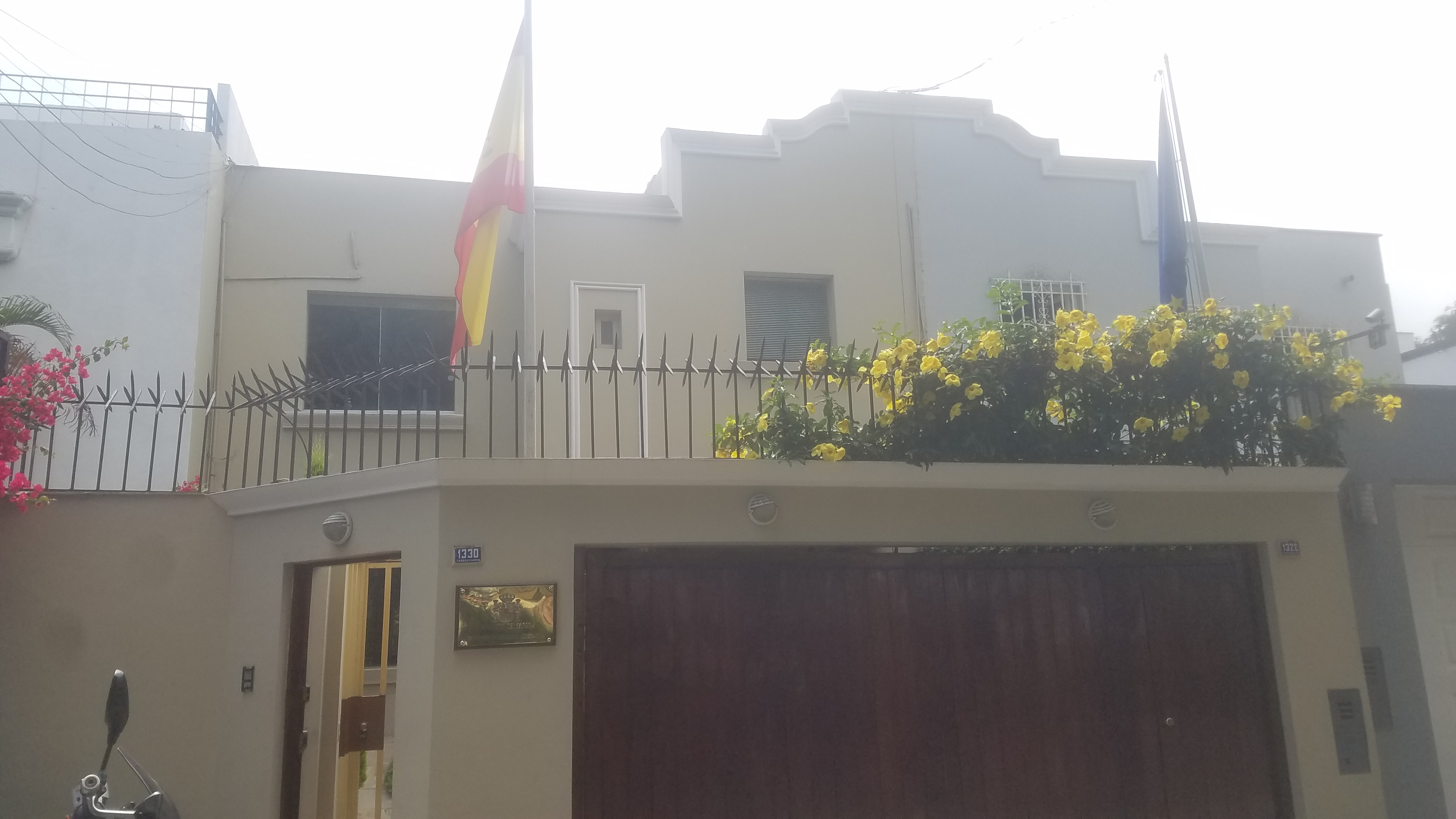
Department of Labour, Migration and Social Security (San Isidro)

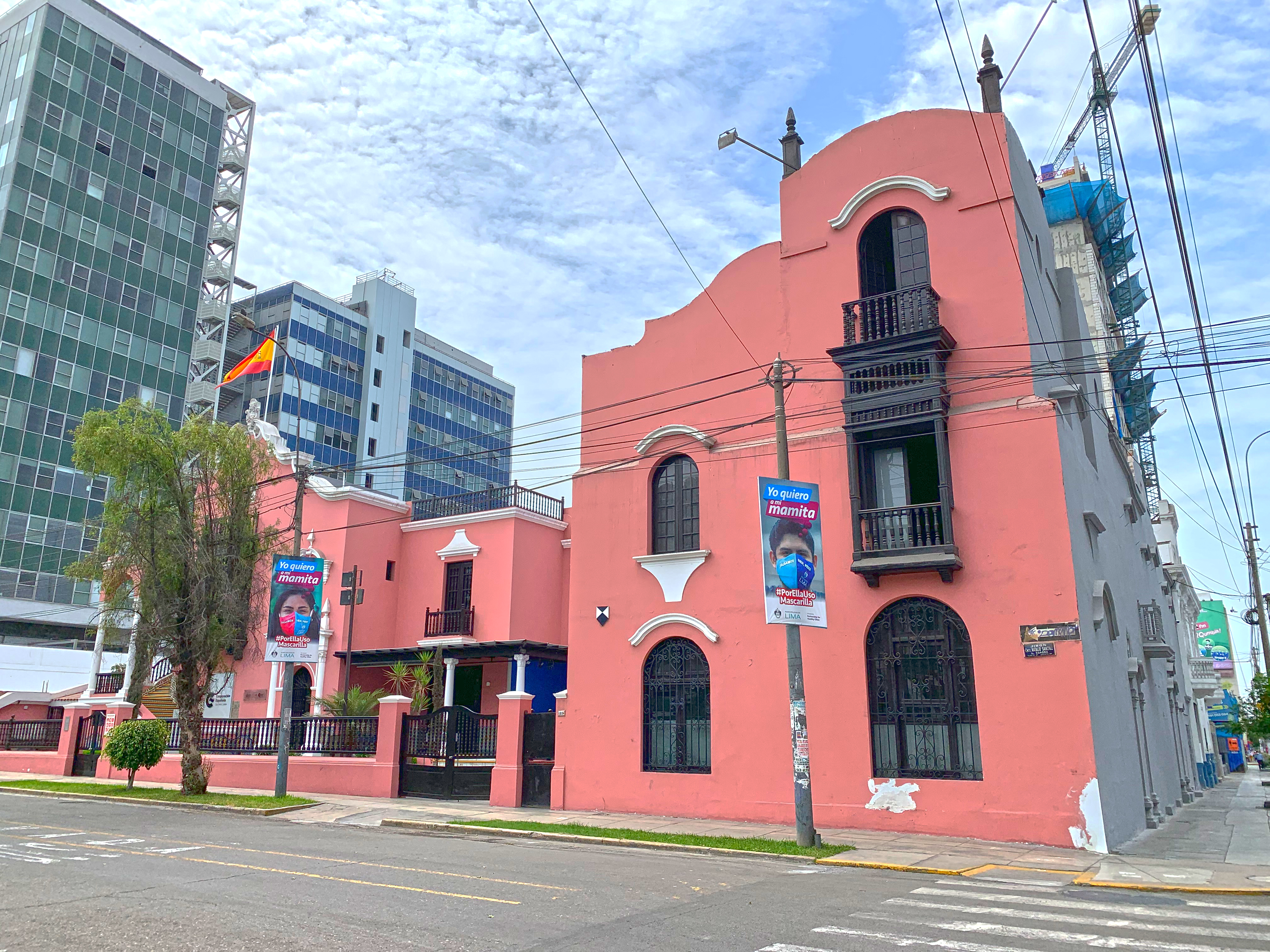
Cultural Centre of Spain (Santa Beatriz)

== See also ==
- Peru–Spain relations
