= Embassy of Peru, Madrid =

Coordinates: 40.4362°N 3.6929°W

Embassy of Peru in Madrid
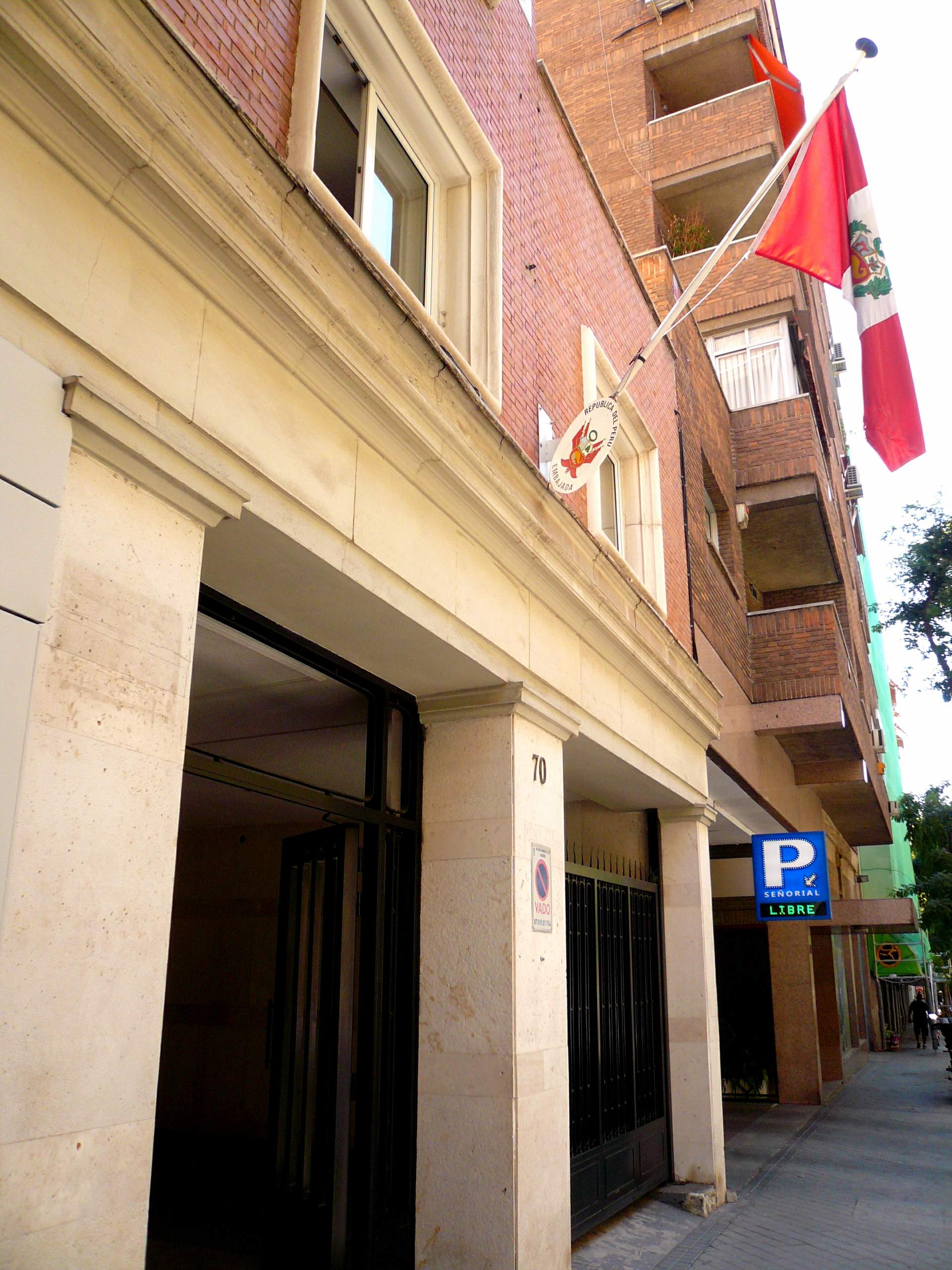
- Ambassador: Walter Gutiérrez
- Website: Embassy of Peru in Spain

The Embassy of Peru in Madrid is the foremost diplomatic mission of Peru in Spain. The current ambassador is Walter Gutiérrez.

Spain also maintains an Embassy in Lima, headed by its Ambassador, Alejandro Alvargonzález San Martín.

== History ==
Both countries officially established relations on August 15, 1879, under Alfonso XII and have since maintained diplomatic relations with a brief exception during the years 1936 to 1939 as a result of the Spanish blockade of the embassy during the Spanish Civil War due to the influx of refugees at the time.

When the Peruvian embassy in Rabat de facto closed in 1973 due to a lack of a chargé d'affaires, the embassy in Madrid became accredited to the North African country. After Peru established relations with the Sahrawi Arab Democratic Republic, the Moroccan government began a diplomatic campaign which led to the embassy reopening in 1986, with both countries strengthening their relations.

The embassy was formerly located at building number 36 of the Calle del Príncipe de Vergara.

In January 2023, the embassy's surroundings were blocked by protestors as part of a series of protests in support of former president Pedro Castillo and against Peruvian president Dina Boluarte.

== See also ==
- Embassy of Spain, Lima
- Peru–Spain relations

== Bibliography ==
- Avilés Flores, Fiorella Kristell (2019-11-04). EL RECONOCIMIENTO DEL PERÚ A LA RASD Y LA POSICIÓN DEL PERÚ SOBRE EL CONFLICTO EN EL SAHARA OCCIDENTAL 35 AÑOS DESPUÉS (PDF) (Thesis) (in Spanish). Academia Diplomática Javier Pérez de Cuellar. Archived from the original on 2021-09-22.
