= Embassy of Germany, Lima =

German diplomatic mission to Peru

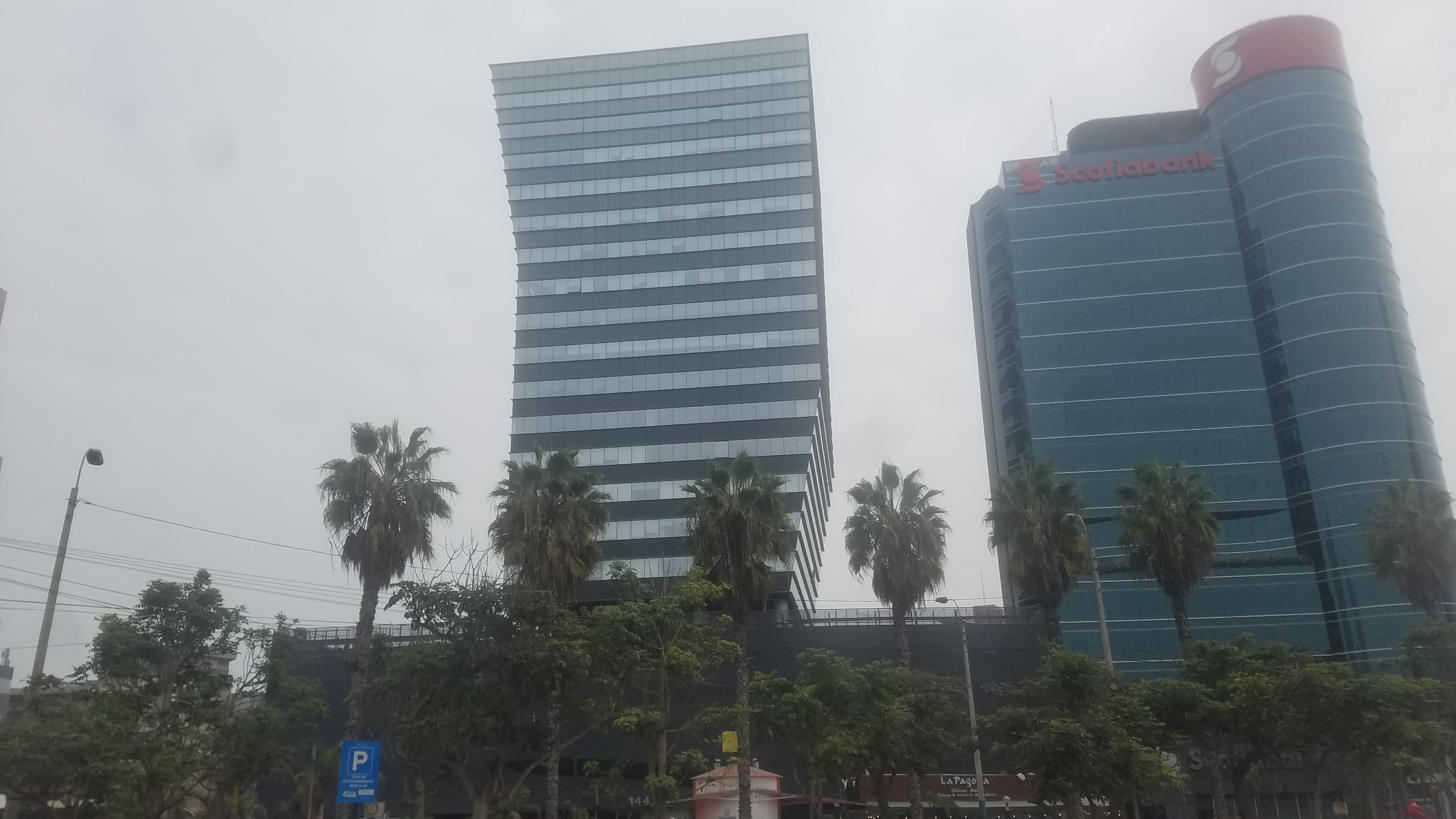
- Alto Caral Building, the embassy's location
- Location: San Isidro District, Lima, Peru
- Address: Av. Dionisio Derteano 144, 7–8F
- Opening: 1952
- Website: Official website

The Embassy of the Federal Republic of Germany in Lima (German: Deutsche Botschaft Lima) represents the permanent diplomatic mission of the Federal Republic of Germany to the Republic of Peru. Since November 2013, the embassy is located at the Alto Caral Building, in San Isidro District, Lima.

The embassy operates honorary consulates in Arequipa, Iquitos, Cuzco, Piura and Trujillo.

The current German ambassador to Peru is Sabine Bloch.

== History ==
=== 19th century ===
As a result of the establishment of consular relations between Peru and the then German Confederation, a Hamburger consulate was opened in Peru in 1828, with other German states opening consulates after, such as Lübeck, Hannover and Bremen. The Prussian headed German Customs Union was established in 1834, with which Peru maintained its commercial relations and was also the signatory of the first diplomatic treaty between both entities in the Prussian consulate in 1860, which was left without effect.

As Germany territorially evolved, Peru maintained relations with its predecessors, such as the North German Confederation, to whom Peru expressed its neutrality during the Franco-Prussian War and whose first envoy presented his credentials on July 5, 1870, until the establishment of the German Empire in 1871. At the time, the Peruvian ambassador to Russia was accredited to Germany from its legation in Saint Petersburg, then changing to that also accredited to Austria-Hungary.

During the War of the Pacific, the German consulates in Lima protested against the excesses committed by the Chilean Army during their land campaign in the south and the occupation of Lima against the German colony in Peru. To prevent such events, foreign consulates had distributed their countries' flags and national symbols to be used by foreign residents in their homes, which was not respected. As a result, many foreigners fled to Lima, where houses were rented, serving as the residences of specific colonies under the protection of their respective legations. The German legation remained open for the duration of the conflict, abstaining from recognizing the Magdalena government, only recognizing the government of Miguel Iglesias on April 14, 1884.

=== 20th century ===
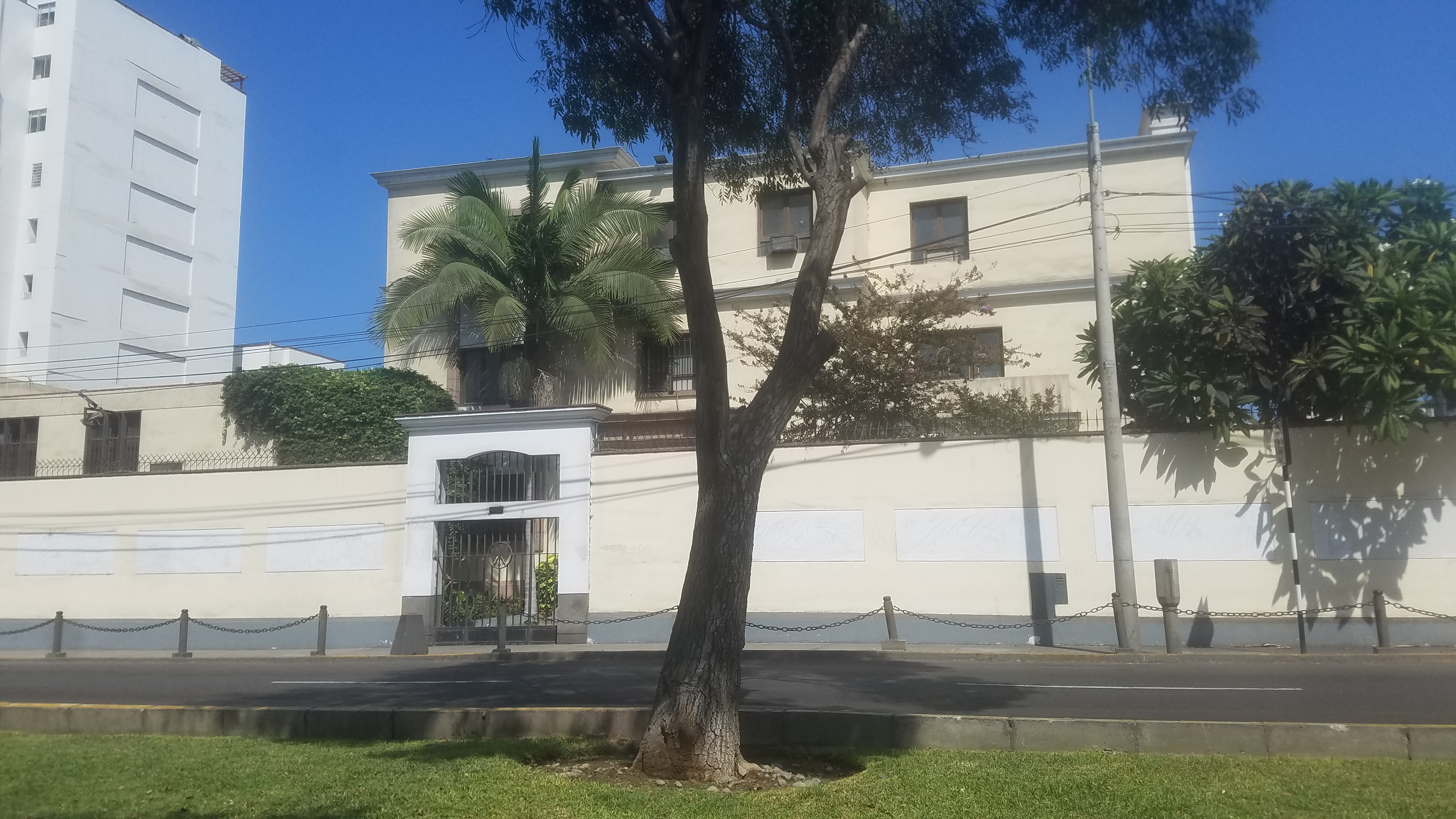
Former German embassy located at Arequipa Avenue.

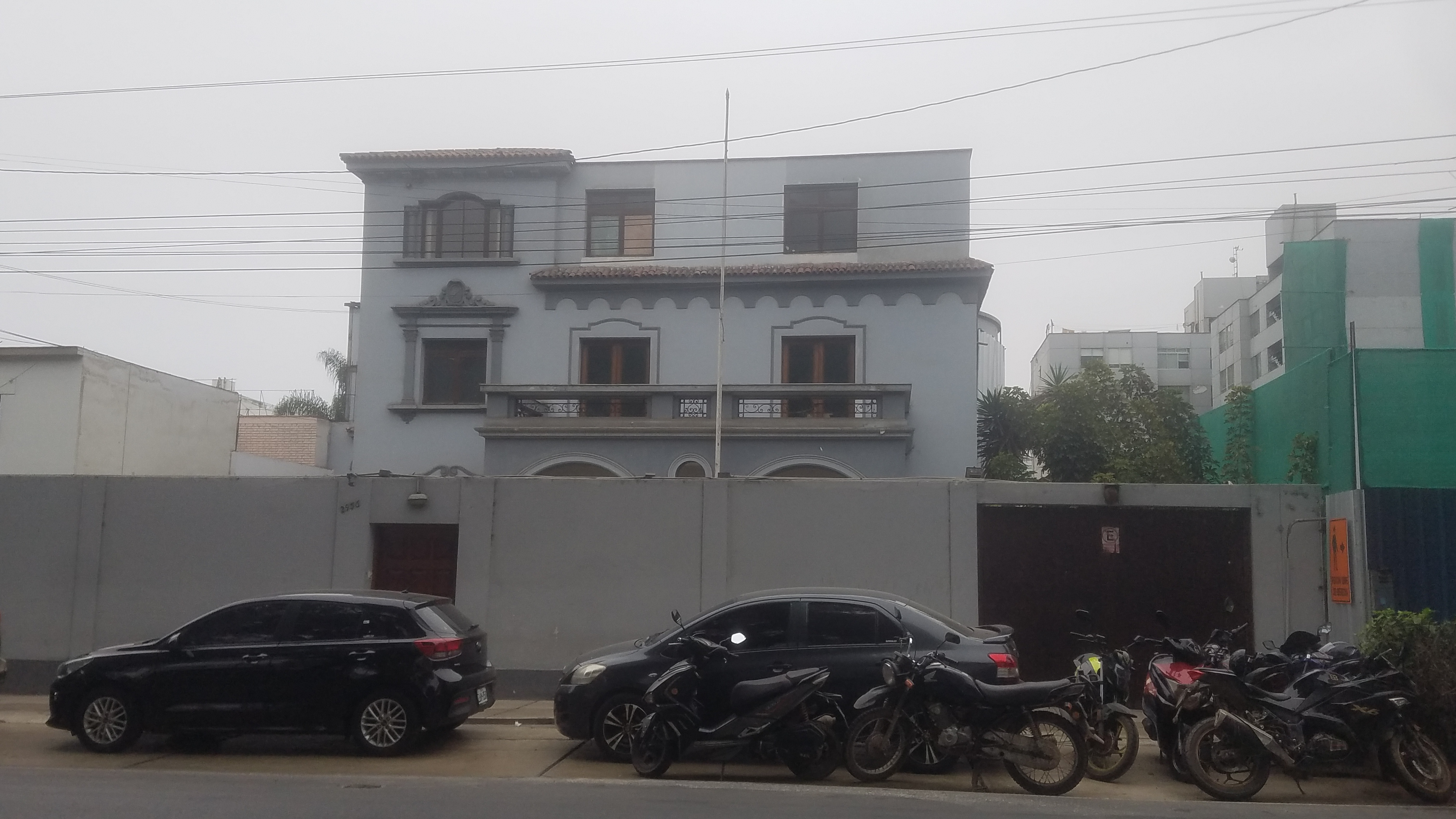
Former East German trade office located at Salaverry Avenue.

Relations between Peru and Germany remained stable until World War I, with Germany maintaining a legation at the Quinta Heeren of Barrios Altos. The now poor relations culminated in the Peruvian government severing its relations with both Germany and Austria-Hungary in 1917. As a result, the countries' legations closed, with the Spanish Embassy now in charge of protecting German interests in Peru. Relations were reestablished with the Weimar Republic on May 28, 1920.

As a result of German declaration of war against the United States, Peru severed its relations with Germany on January 24, 1942, notifying then German ambassador Willy Noebel via a letter. On the same day, Noebel requested his safe passage out of the country, notifying the Peruvian government that the Spanish Embassy would again be in charge of protecting German interests in Peru. Prior to the rupture of relations, the consul's residence was located at the Ferrán Building, located at Progress Avenue, from where pro-German activities were organised, with local Peruvians also participating.

After the Second World War, relations were reestablished on January 31, 1951, with the Federal Republic of Germany, who opened a consulate in Lima on September 4, 1952, that was elevated to embassy level in 1953. Following a series of different locations, it acquired a location at 4202-4210 Arequipa Avenue in 1967.

After the 1968 Peruvian coup d'état and the establishment of Juan Velasco Alvarado's Revolutionary Government, relations with the German Democratic Republic were also established on December 28, 1972. A diplomatic mission, located in Javier Prado Avenue, was opened in Lima, also accredited to Bolivia. A trade office also operated at Salaverry Avenue. The mission ceased to exist following German reunification in 1990.

During the internal conflict in Peru, like other embassies, the German embassy was targeted at least twice, as an attempt was made on a Civil Guard that was guarding it on September 16, 1984; and the embassy was affected by a series of embassy bombings that took place on February 21, 1986, and also targeted the Chinese, Spain, Romanian, Japan, Chilean and Argentine embassies. The German ambassador's residence was also targeted in an unsuccessful arson attack on September 2, 1983.

In July 2002, the embassy inaugurated its consular building, adjacent to the chancery. The embassy moved from its long-standing address to the Alto Caral building in November 2013.

=== Residence ===
The ambassador's residence is located 106 Cerro Mirador Street in Las Casuarinas, a neighbourhood of Santiago de Surco. It was completely renovated in 2003 and 2004 at a total cost of € 450,000.

== Mission and organization ==
The embassy has the task of maintaining German-Peruvian relations, representing German interests to the government of Peru and informing the federal government about developments in Peru.

The embassy has the following areas of work:

- Politics department (foreign and domestic policy)
- Economics department (economic policy, foreign trade promotion)
- Department of Culture (education, art and science)
- Military Attaché Staff (Head: Frigate Commander)
- Development Cooperation Department (Focus on state modernization, sustainable urban development, protection and sustainable use of natural resources and climate change; Peru has been supported with around two billion euros since the beginning of the bilateral cooperation.)

The embassy's legal and consular department offers German citizens consular services and assistance in emergencies. The embassy's consular district covers all of Peru. The visa office issues entry permits for citizens of third countries residing in Peru who are subject to the visa requirement. Peruvian citizens do not need a visa for stays in the Schengen area (up to 90 days per half year).

== See also ==
- Germany–Peru relations
- Embassy of the United States, Lima
- Embassy of Russia, Lima

== Bibliography ==
- Novak, Fabián (2004). Las relaciones entre el Perú y Alemania (1828–2003) (in Spanish) (1st ed.). Lima: Fondo Editorial PUCP.
