= Mutsu =

Mutsu may refer to:

== Places ==
- Mutsu, Aomori, a city in Aomori prefecture, Japan
- Mutsu Province, one of the old provinces of Japan
- Mutsu Bay, a bay inside Aomori Prefecture, Japan
- Mutsu, Estonia, a village in Vastseliina Parish, Võru County, Estonia

== People ==
- Mutsu Munemitsu (1844–1897), diplomat in Japan during the Meiji period
- Mutsu Hirokichi (1869–1942), Japanese diplomat and an educator in Meiji and Taishō period Japan
- Iso Mutsu (1867–1930), author of the first guide to Kamakura ever written
- Mutsu Ryōko (1856–1900) Japanese noblewoman and humanitarian

== Other uses ==
- Mutsu (nuclear ship), a 1970 merchant ship that was Japan's only nuclear-powered ship
- Japanese battleship Mutsu, a 1920 battleship of the Imperial Japanese Navy
- Bluefish, a sushi/sashimi ingredient
- Mutsu (apple), a yellow-gold apple also known as Crispin
- The fictional Mutsu clan in the manga and anime series Shura no Toki - Age of Chaos
- Mutsu Kokubun-ji Yakushidō, the provincial temple of former Mutsu Province, Japan
- Mutsu Tonohohon, an action video game released in 2002 by Tomy
