= Embassy of Peru, Tokyo =

Peruvian diplomatic mission in Japan

Embassy of Peru in Tokyo
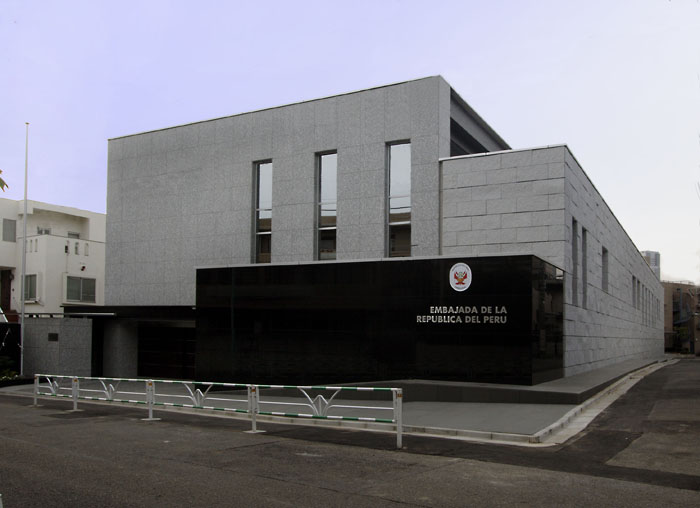
- Location: Tokyo, Japan
- Opened: 1950s
- Ambassador: Roberto Seminario
- Website: Official website

The Embassy of Peru in Japan (Japanese: 駐日ペルー大使館; Spanish: Embajada del Perú en Japón) represents the permanent diplomatic mission of the Republic of Peru in Japan. The chancery is located in Hiroo, Shibuya, Tokyo. The embassy operates two consulates general in Tokyo (Note: Its jurisdiction extends to the prefectures and regions of Hokkaido, Aomori, Akita, Fukushima, Iwate, Miyagi, Yamagata, Chiba, Gunma, Ibaraki, Kanagawa, Saitama, Tochigi, Tokyo, Nagano, Niigata, Shizuoka, and Yamanashi.) and Nagoya. (Note: Its jurisdiction extends to Kyushu, Okinawa, Shikoku, Chugoku, Kinki, Toyama, Ishikawa, Fukui, Hokuriku, Gifu, Aichi, and Chubu.)

The current Peruvian ambassador to Japan is Roberto Seminario.

== History ==
Both countries established relations in 1873, and 790 Japanese immigrants arrived to Peru 20 years later in 1899. Over time, Peru's Japanese population has become the second largest in Latin America after Brazil.

During the early 20th century, Peru had consulates in Tokyo, Kobe and Osaka. These were closed after Peru severed relations with Japan in January 1942 due to the Attack on Pearl Harbor during World War II. Relations were reestablished after the treaty of San Francisco, and legations between both countries were reopened between 1952 and 1955, being followed in 1956 by an exchange of embassies.

A consulate-general in Nagoya opened in 2008.

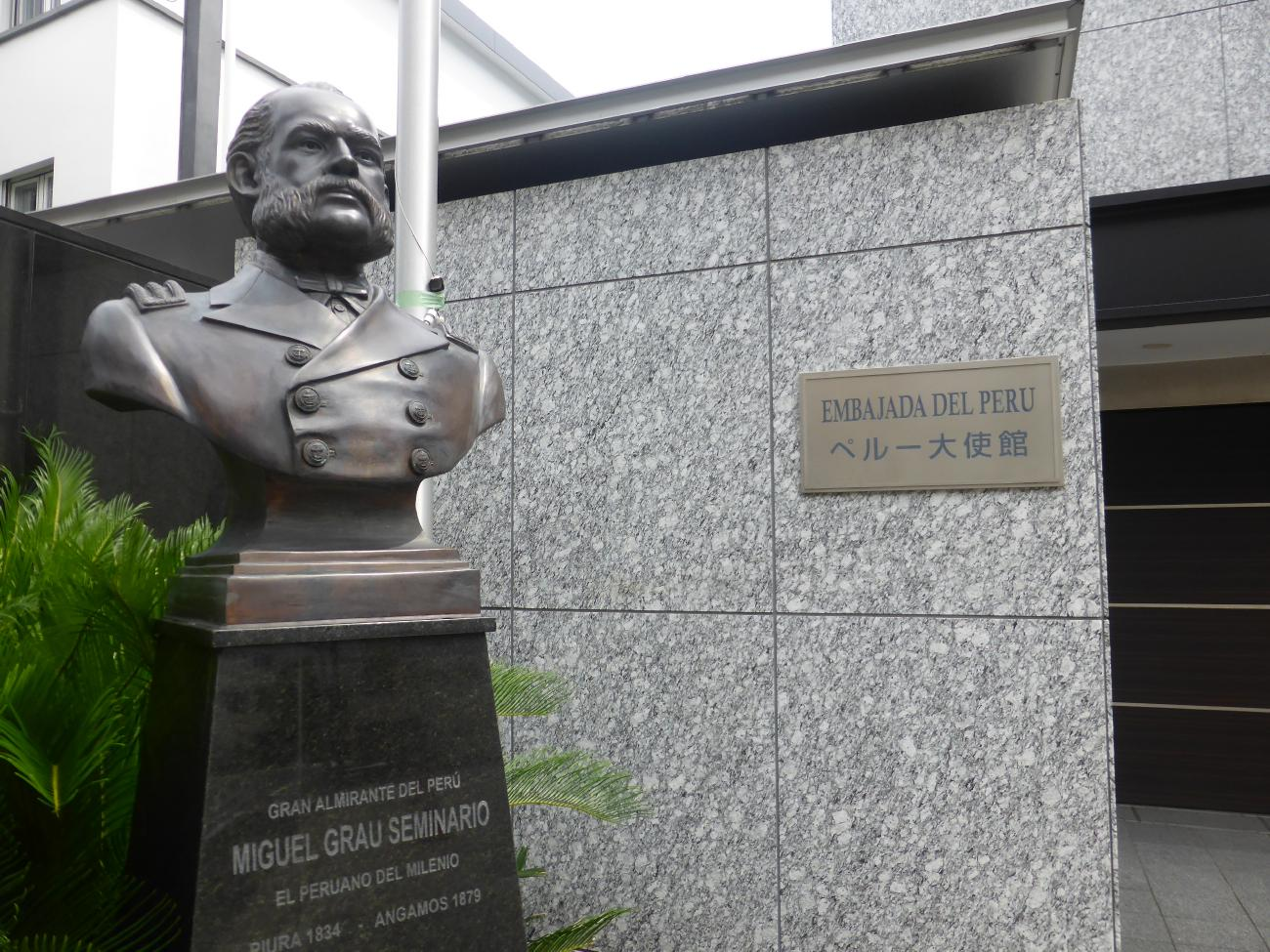
Bust of Miguel Grau at the embassy

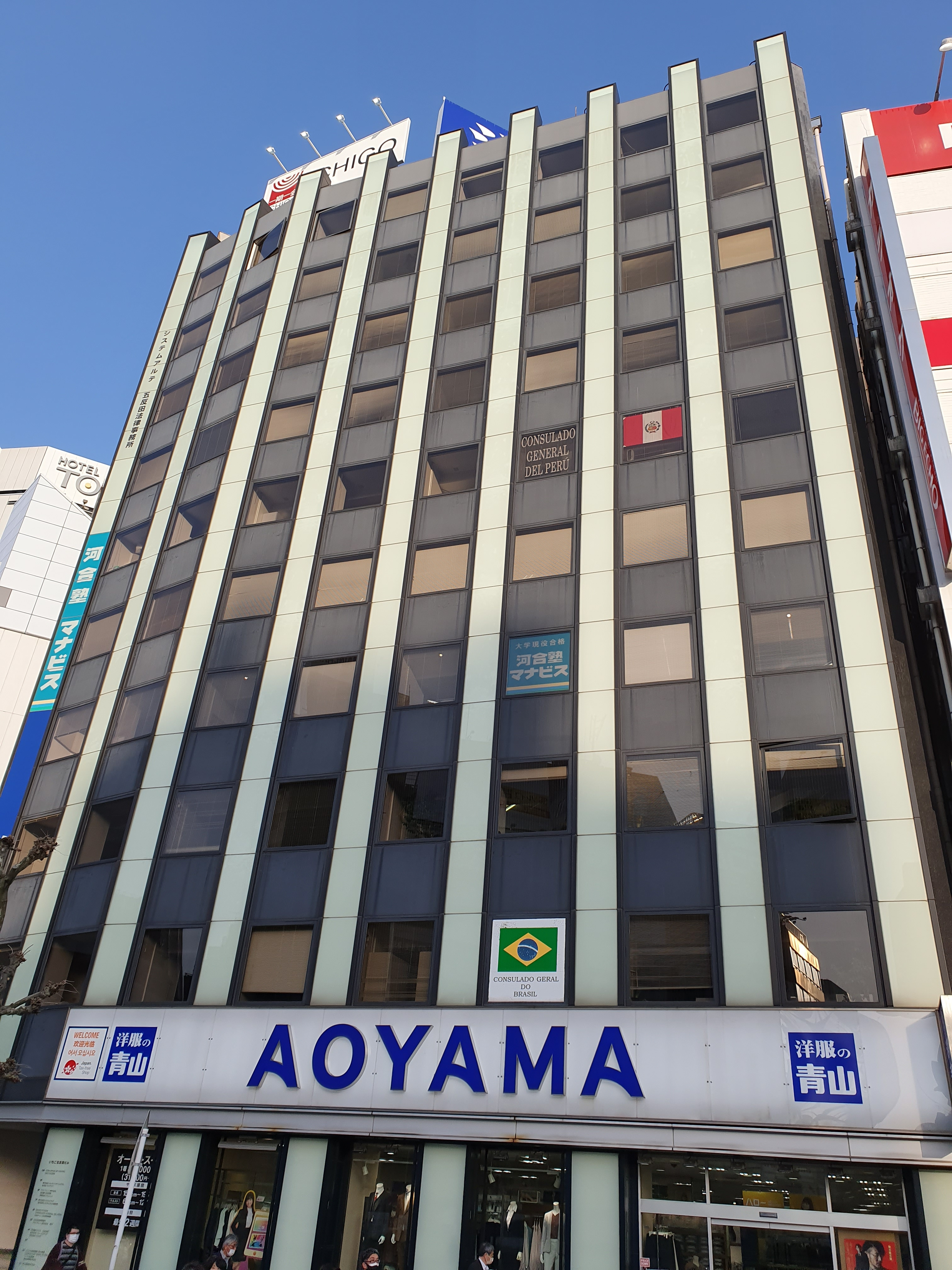
Consulate in Tokyo

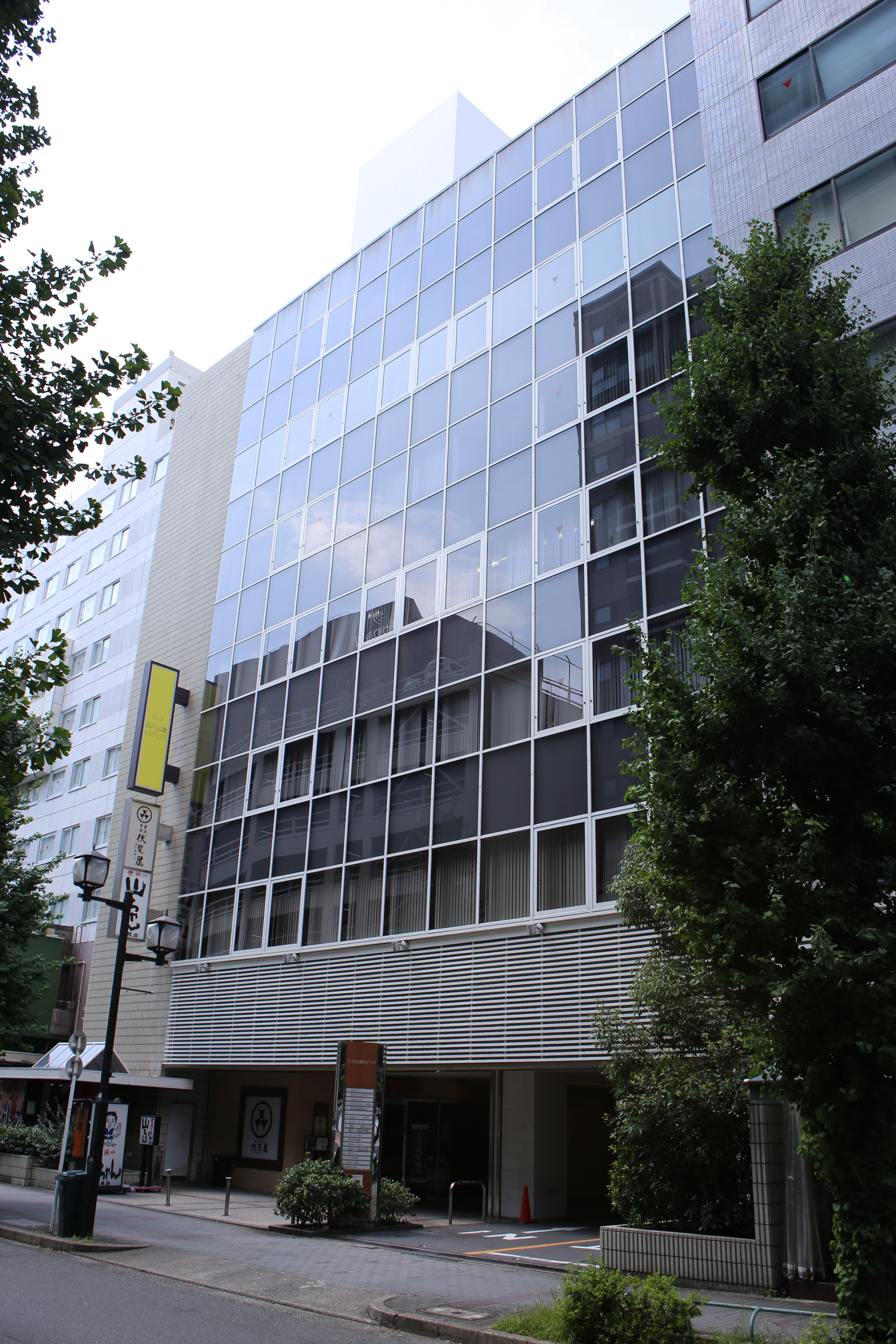
Consulate in Nagoya

== List of representatives ==
=== Consuls-General ===
==== Tokyo ====
Consulate-General of Peru in Tokyo (Note: Japanese: 在東京ペルー総領事館, Spanish: Consulado General del Perú en Tokio)
Consul-General	Period
Edgar Eduardo Gómez-Sánchez Gutti	until 2002
Carlos Alberto Yrigoyen Forno	2002–2003
Héctor Francisco Matallana Martínez	2004–2007
Edgar Eduardo Fernando Gómez-Sánchez Gutti	2007–2011
Julio Arturo Cárdenas Velarde	2011–2014
Jorge Arturo Jallo Sandoval	2014–2019
Alexis Paul Aquino Albengrin	2019–2021
Anne Maeda Ikehata	2021–present

==== Nagoya ====
Consulate-General of Peru in Nagoya (Note: Japanese: 在名古屋ペルー総領事館, Spanish: Consulado General del Perú en Nagoya)
Consul-General	Period
Eduardo Manuel Alfredo Llosa Larrabure	2008
Luis Gilberto Mendívil Canales	2008–2010
Carlos Alberto Ríos Segura (interim)	2010–2011
Gustavo Adolfo Peña Chamot	2011–2017
Antonio Pedro Miranda Sisniegas	2017–2022
Julissa de Jesús Alegre (interim)	2022
Luis Alfredo Espinoza Aguilar	2022–present

== See also ==
- Embassy of Japan, Lima
- Japan–Peru relations

== Bibliography ==
- Lausent-Herrera, Isabelle (1991). PASADO Y PRESENTE DE LA COMUNIDAD JAPONESA EN EL PERU (PDF) (in Spanish) (1st ed.). Peru: IFEA. ISBN 84-89302-01-4.
