= List of ambassadors of Japan to Peru =

Ambassador of Japan to Peru
- Incumbent; Tsuyoshi Yamamoto since October 24, 2023
- Style: His Excellency
- Appointer: Naruhito
- Website: Embassy of Japan in Peru

The Ambassador of Japan to Peru is an officer of the Japanese Ministry of Foreign Affairs and the head of the Embassy of Japan to the Republic of Peru.

Both countries established relations in 1873, and 790 Japanese immigrants arrived in Peru 20 years later in 1899. Today, Peru has the second largest Japanese population in Latin America after Brazil.

Relations have been warm, although incidents have occurred. Before the establishment of relations, a diplomatic incident occurred between both countries, and after Alberto Fujimori (whose presidency was marked by events such as the Japanese embassy hostage crisis) faxed his resignation to the Presidency of Peru, Japan refused to extradite him as he had become a Japanese citizen, only arrested in Chile after his attempt to return to Peru. Peru severed relations with Japan only once, in January 1942, due to the attack on Pearl Harbor during World War II.

== List of representatives ==
| Name | Portrait | Term begin | Term end | Emperor | Notes |
|---|---|---|---|---|---|
| Yoshifumi Murota (室田義文) | | 1897 | 1900 | Meiji | |
| Sato Aimaro (佐藤愛麿) | | 1900 | 1902 | Meiji | |
| Sugimura Toraichi (杉村虎一) | | 1902 | 1906 | Meiji | |
| Arakawa Mi-ji (荒川巳次) | | 1906 | 1908 | Meiji | |
| Hioki Eki (日置益) | | 1908 | 1914 | Meiji | |
| Kondo Sunaokichi (近藤愿吉) | | 1914 | 1914 | Taishō | |
| Iijima Kametaro (飯島亀太郎) | | 1914 | 1917 | Taishō | |
| Tatsuki Nana Futoshi (田付七太) | | 1917 | 1917 | Taishō | |
| Amari Zoji (甘利造次) | | 1917 | 1921 | Taishō | |
| Shimizu Tadashi Saburō (清水精三郎) | | 1921 | 1925 | Taishō | |
| Yamazaki Kaoruichi (山崎馨一) | | 1925 | 1929 | Taishō | |
| Saburō Kurusu (来栖三郎) | | 1929 | 1933 | Shōwa | |
| Yoshiharu Murakami (村上義温) | | 1933 | 1938 | Shōwa | |
| Kitada Seimoto (北田正元) | | 1938 | 1940 | Shōwa | |
| Ryūki Sakamoto (龍騎坂本) | | March 1941 | 1942 | Shōwa | The legation in Lima closed in 1942 due to World War II. |
| Takeo Ozawa (武雄小沢) | | 1953 | | Shōwa | The mission reopened in 1952. |
| Kohei Teraoka (康平寺岡) | | February 28, 1956 | June 14, 1957 | Shōwa | |
| {{{last}}} (康平寺岡) | | June 14, 1957 | 1958 | Shōwa | As ambassador. |
| Kazuichi Miura (和一三浦) | | 1958 | 1961 | Shōwa | |
| Fumio Miura (文雄三浦) | | February 20, 1961 | 1964 | Shōwa | |
| Tatsuo Ban (達夫禁止) | | 1970 | ? | Shōwa | |
| Eijiro Noda (野田英二郎) | | 1981 | 1983 | Shōwa | |
| Masaki Seo (正樹ソ) | | 1989 | ? | Akihito | |
| Morihisa Aoki (青木盛久) | | 1994 | 1997 | Akihito | Hostage and homeowner during the Japanese embassy hostage crisis. |
| Konishi Yoshizo (小西芳三) | | 1997 | 2000 | Akihito | |
| Takashi Kiya (木谷隆) | | 2000 | 2002 | Akihito | |
| Narita Yubun (成田右文) | | 2002 | 2005 | Akihito | |
| Hitohiro Ishida (石田仁宏) | | 2005 | 2008 | Akihito | |
| Megata Shūichirō (目賀田周一郎) | | 2008 | 2011 | Akihito | |
| Masahiro Fukukawa (福川正浩) | | May 13, 2011 | 2014 | Akihito | |
| Tatsuya Kabutan (株丹達也) | | 2014 | 2018 | Akihito | |
| Sadayuki Tsuchiya | | 2018 | | Akihito | |
| Kazuyuki Katayama (和幸片山) | | July 2020 | 2023 | Naruhito | |
| Tsuyoshi Yamamoto | | October 24, 2023 | Incumbent | Naruhito | |

== See also ==
- List of ambassadors of Peru to Japan
