= Hirohito (disambiguation) =

Hirohito (1901–1989) posthumously Emperor Shōwa of Japan; reigned 1926 to 1989.

Hirohito may also refer to:

- Emperor Fushimi (1287–1298), birth name Hirohito
- Hirohito Furui (b. 1967), a Japanese keyboardist, music arranger, and musician
- Hirohito Gotō (born 1969), Japanese director, playwright, and actor
- Hirohito Ōta (born 1970), Japanese freelance writer
- Hirohito Nakamura (born 1974), Japanese footballer

== See also ==
- Emperor Fushimi (1265–1317), Japanese emperor from 1287 to 1298; personal name was Hirohito
