= Embassy of Japan, Lima =

Japanese diplomatic mission to Peru

Embassy of Japan
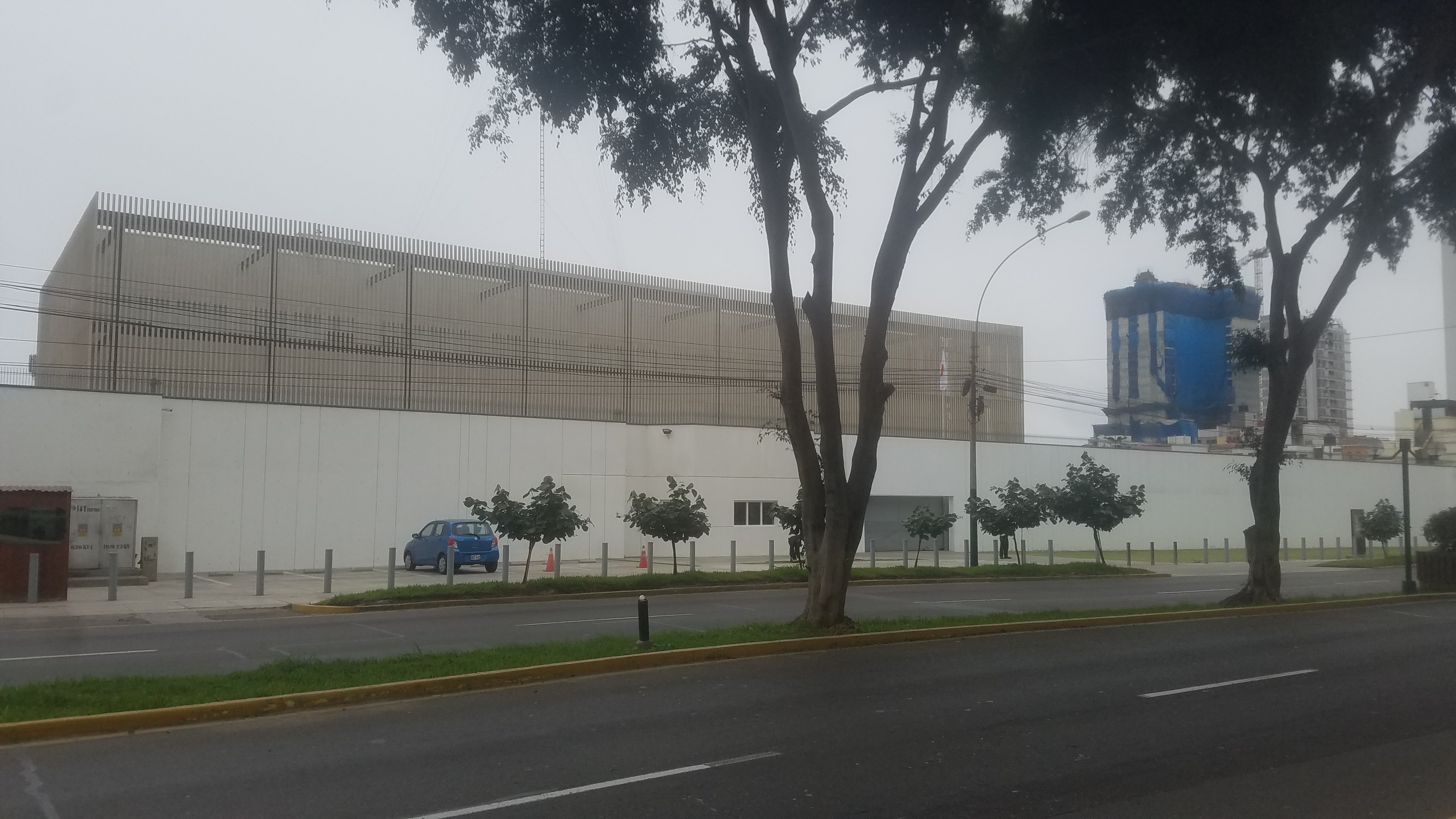
- Location: Jesús María District, Lima, Peru
- Address: Avenida San Felipe 356
- Opening: June 8, 1952
- Website: Official website

The Embassy of Japan in Lima (Japanese: 在ペルー日本国大使館; Spanish: Embajada del Japón en el Perú) is the official diplomatic mission of Japan to the Republic of Peru.

The current Japanese ambassador to Peru is Kazuyuki Katayama.

== History ==
Peru and Japan first established diplomatic relations in 1873, with Peru being the first Latin American country to establish diplomatic relations with the East Asian state.

=== 20th century ===
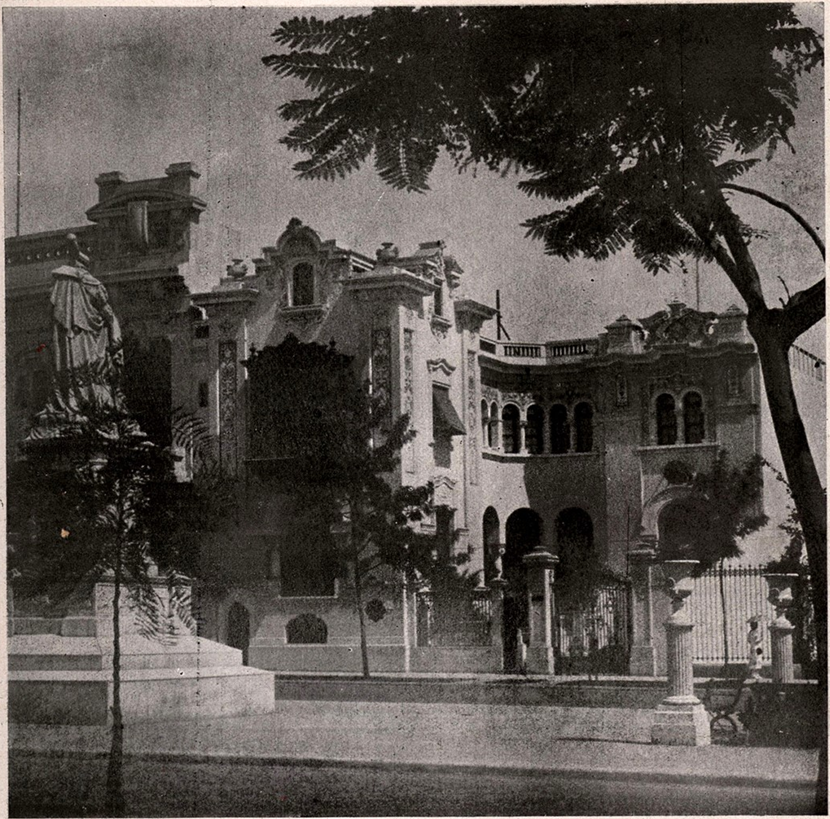
The Legation at Paseo Colón in 1925.

The Imperial Legation in Lima was closed in 1942 due to the rupture of relations between both countries as a result of World War II. It had previously occupied the Quinta Heeren of Barrios Altos, after which it had moved to the Casa Menchaca of the Paseo Colón, built in 1920 and designed by French architect Claude Sahut, known for its azulejos.

After the end of the war, the Legation in Peru was reopened on June 8, 1952, becoming a Consulate on December 26 of the same year, and finally being upgraded to an Embassy.

During the internal conflict in Peru, like other embassies, the embassy was targeted, as it was affected by a series of embassy bombings that took place on February 21, 1986 and also targeted the Chinese, German, Romanian, Spanish, Chilean and Argentine embassies. It was again targeted in 1992 with a car bomb that wounded 25 people when it exploded.

=== 21st century ===
The embassy, located in a traditional house in Jesús María, was revamped during a five-year period. For this reason, its offices temporarily moved to Magdalena del Mar District, functioning at the 15th and 16th floors of the SkyTower757 building, located at number 757 of Javier Prado Oeste Avenue. This move took place on November 18–19, 2017. With the new building concluded, the embassy moved again to its original address starting on March 21, 2021, and concluding on the 28th.

=== Residence ===
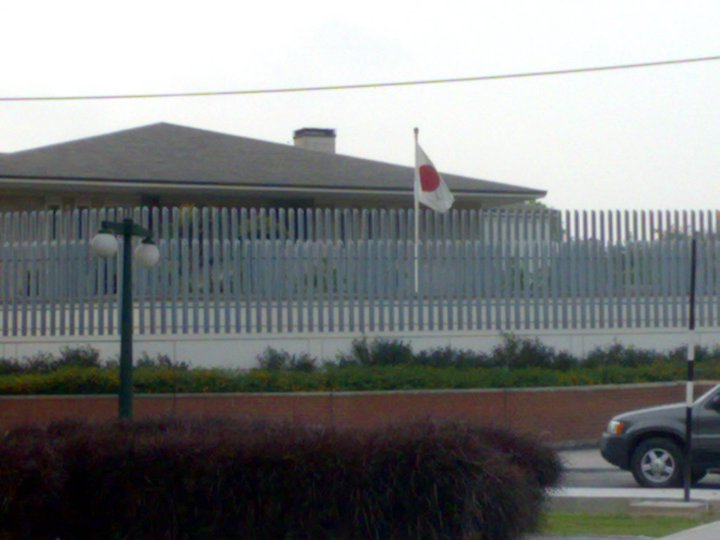
The embassy's residence.

The embassy's residence is located at the intersection of Salaverry and Javier Prado Oeste avenues, in San Isidro, an upper-class district of Lima.

==== Hostage crisis ====
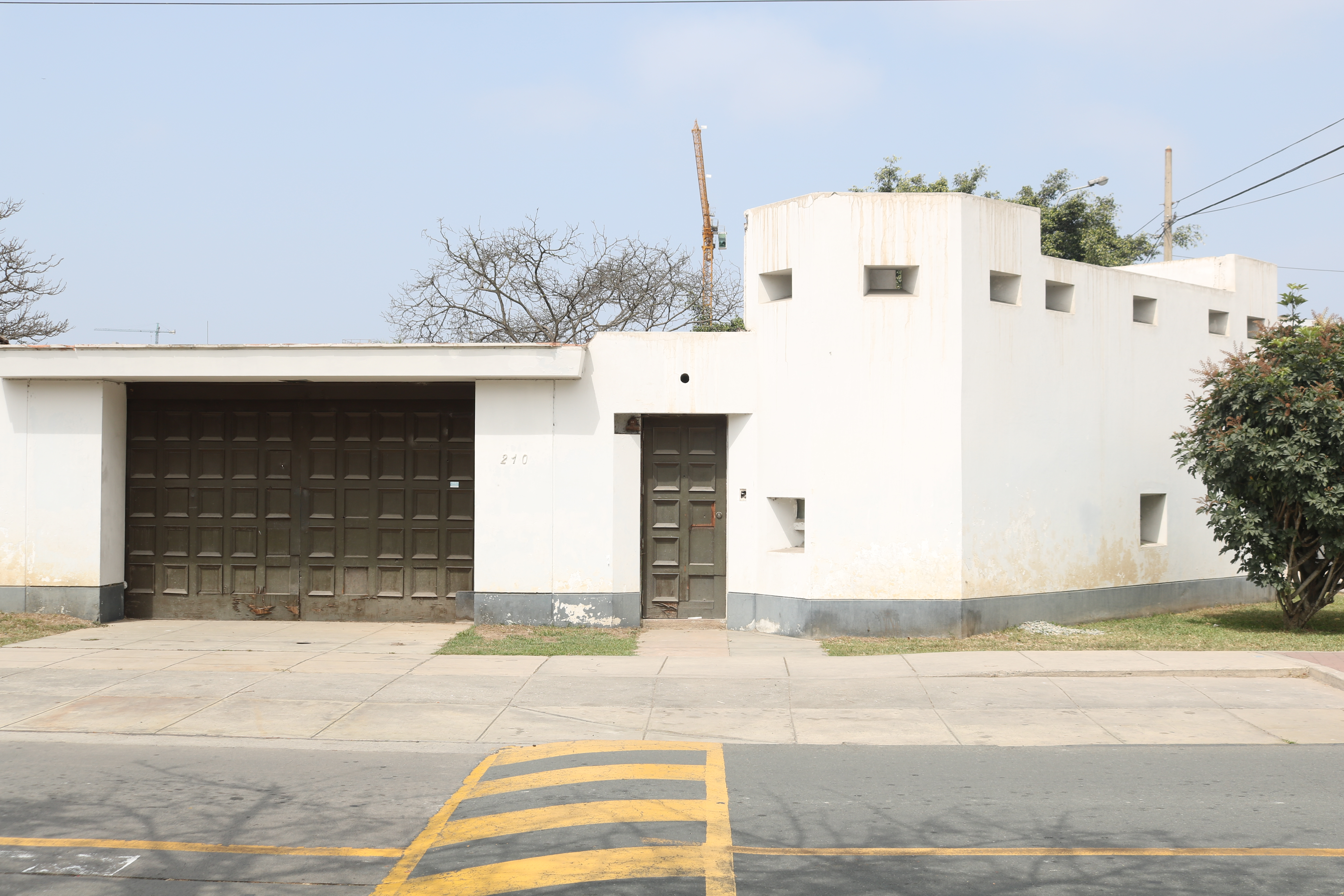
The (former) residence in 2018.

In 1974, the Japanese government acquired a palace in San Isidro District built in 1942 by Antenor Rizo-Patrón Araoz for his wife, Graciela Basurco Gonzáles, to serve as the embassy's residence. The building was located at number 210 of Tomás Edison street, at the street's corner with Barcelona street, and was sold to the Japanese by the couple's children. It was based on the palace featured in Gone with the Wind.

In December 1996, terrorists from the Túpac Amaru Revolutionary Movement stormed the residence of the Japanese ambassador, Morihisa Aoki, and held the attendees of a party celebrating the birthday of emperor Akihito hostage for several months in what became known as the Japanese embassy hostage crisis. The situation would end with the execution of Operation Chavín de Huántar, a successful raid by the Peruvian Armed Forces on April 22, 1997.

The 6,223-square-metre (66,980 sq ft) location of the former embassy implicated in the hostage crisis was eventually demolished in October of the same year, starting on the 13th, with only the outside walls remaining. Aoki's replacement, Yoshizo Konishi, was housed in a hotel while a replacement was sought. The terrain was sold to a local company in 2012, with an employee claiming in 2022 that there were no plans to use it for the foreseeable future.

== See also ==
- Japan–Peru relations
- List of ambassadors of Peru to Japan
