= Shinki =

Shinki may refer to:

- Busou Shinki, a product line of small, armored women action-figure toys manufactured in Japan
- Venancio Shinki (1932–2016), Peruvian painter
- Shinki Bus
