= Iso Mutsu =

British writer (1867–1930)

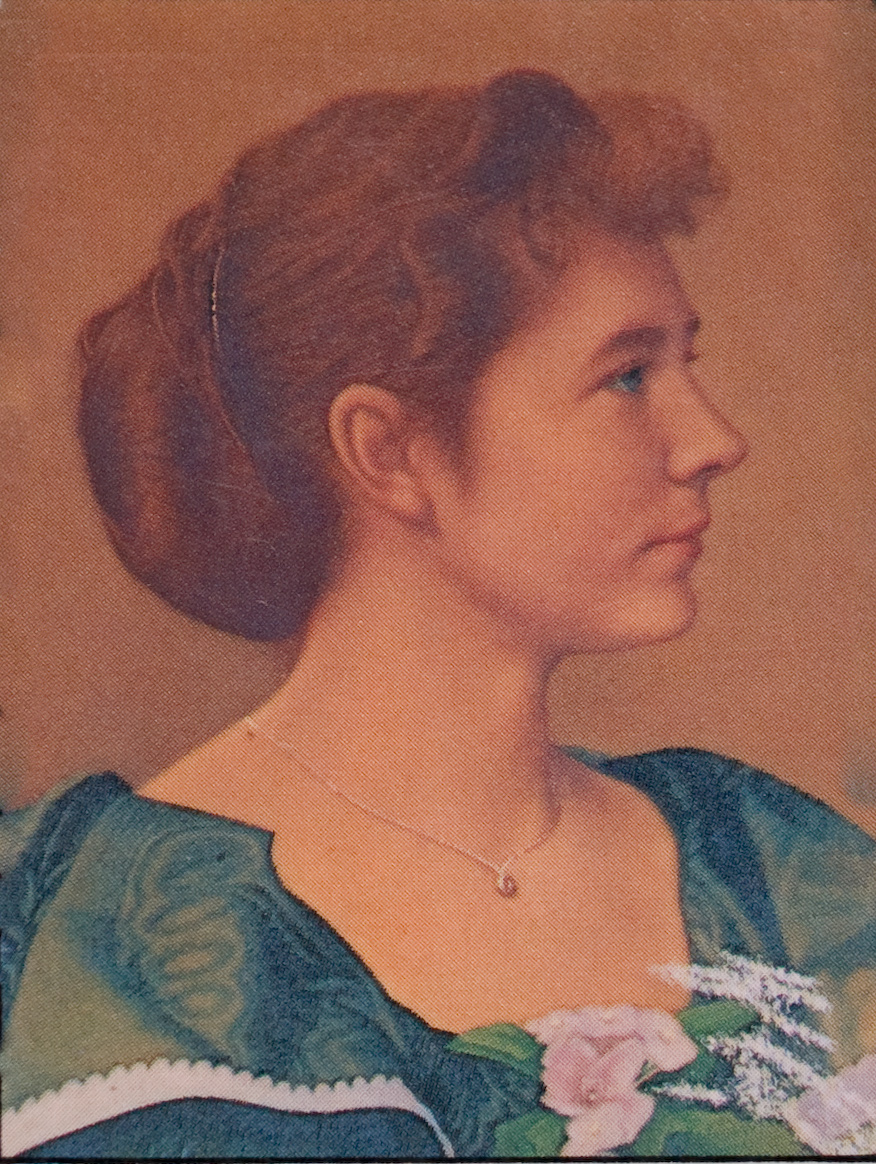
- Mutsu in her book Kamakura: Fact and Legend's cover
- Born: Gertrude Ethel Passingham; 1867; Oxford, Oxfordshire, England
- Died: 1930 (aged 62–63); Kamakura, Japan
- Occupation: Writer
- Spouse: Hirokichi Mutsu
- Children: Ian Mutsu

Countess Iso Mutsu (陸奥 イソ, Mutsu Iso; 1867 – 1930), born Gertrude Ethel Passingham, was a British writer. She married a Japanese nobleman and diplomat, came with him to Japan in 1910 and lived in Kamakura until her death in 1930. In 1918 she wrote the classic guide Kamakura: Fact and Legend.

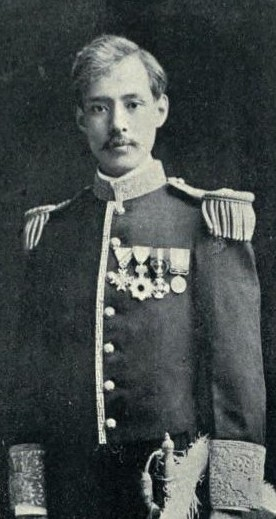
Husband, Mutsu Hirokichi, 1910

== Life ==
She was born in Oxford. Her father was the landlord of Count Hirokichi Mutsu, son of the then Japanese foreign minister Munemitsu Mutsu, who was studying at Cambridge, and they fell in love. His father strongly opposed his wedding to a foreigner and a commoner. Her family was contrary to the union too. The two didn't give up and, after his father died, when Hirokichi was appointed Consul in San Francisco, he managed to convince her to join him there. This in spite of the fact they hadn't met in over five years.

Because he was a diplomat, marriage still had to wait, and to stay with him she finally had to pretend to be a child's governess. It was with that role that she first arrived in Japan in 1901. Four years later, the imperial authorization to wed arrived and, after 17 years of courtship and subterfuges, the couple finally married in London in 1905. For reasons of protocol, she took Japanese citizenship and a Japanese name. Her husband suggested Iso (磯), meaning seaside, because she loved the beach so much and because it sounded a little like Ethel. After the wedding she followed him around the world, finally returning to Japan with him, never to leave again. She liked the country and successfully adapted to it, even giving English lessons to members of the Imperial Family, among them Prince Chichibu, brother of Emperor Hirohito.

She died in 1930 in Kamakura and her funeral was held in a Christian Methodist church. After the Christian ceremony, the Vice Abbot from the great Engaku-ji Zen temple took the pulpit, pronounced a eulogy and recited a sūtra for her soul. She is buried in the Mutsu family's yagura in the Jufuku-ji temple's graveyard in Kamakura, not far from the cenotaphs of great historical figures Hōjō Masako and Minamoto no Sanetomo. Her son Ian Mutsu became a famous newsman and documentary director.

== Kamakura: fact and legend ==
Iso Mutsu was one of the first foreigners in Japan to understand that Kamakura's attraction lies in its extraordinary past and in its temples. She wrote her work after years of research, during which she interviewed temple abbots, high priests and monks. She also consulted Japanese texts, among them the famous Azuma Kagami, a medieval book that describes in great detail 80 years in the life of the city, and the Taiheiki, a medieval war epic.

The book contains a condensed history of the city of Kamakura and an introduction to over 40 historical locations and temples ranging from Enoshima to Ofuna. She was swimming in Sagami Bay when the Great Kanto earthquake of 1923 struck, and she described the experience in the 1930 edition of her guide. Mutsu's book was republished first in 1930, then in an updated version in 1995 thanks to a grant from the Tokyo Club, and finally in 2006.

== Family tree ==
Count Mutsu Munemitsu	Countess Mutsu Ryōko
Countess Iso Mutsu	Count Mutsu Hirokichi
Ian Mutsu
