= Ōe Taku =

Japanese politician

- 大江 卓
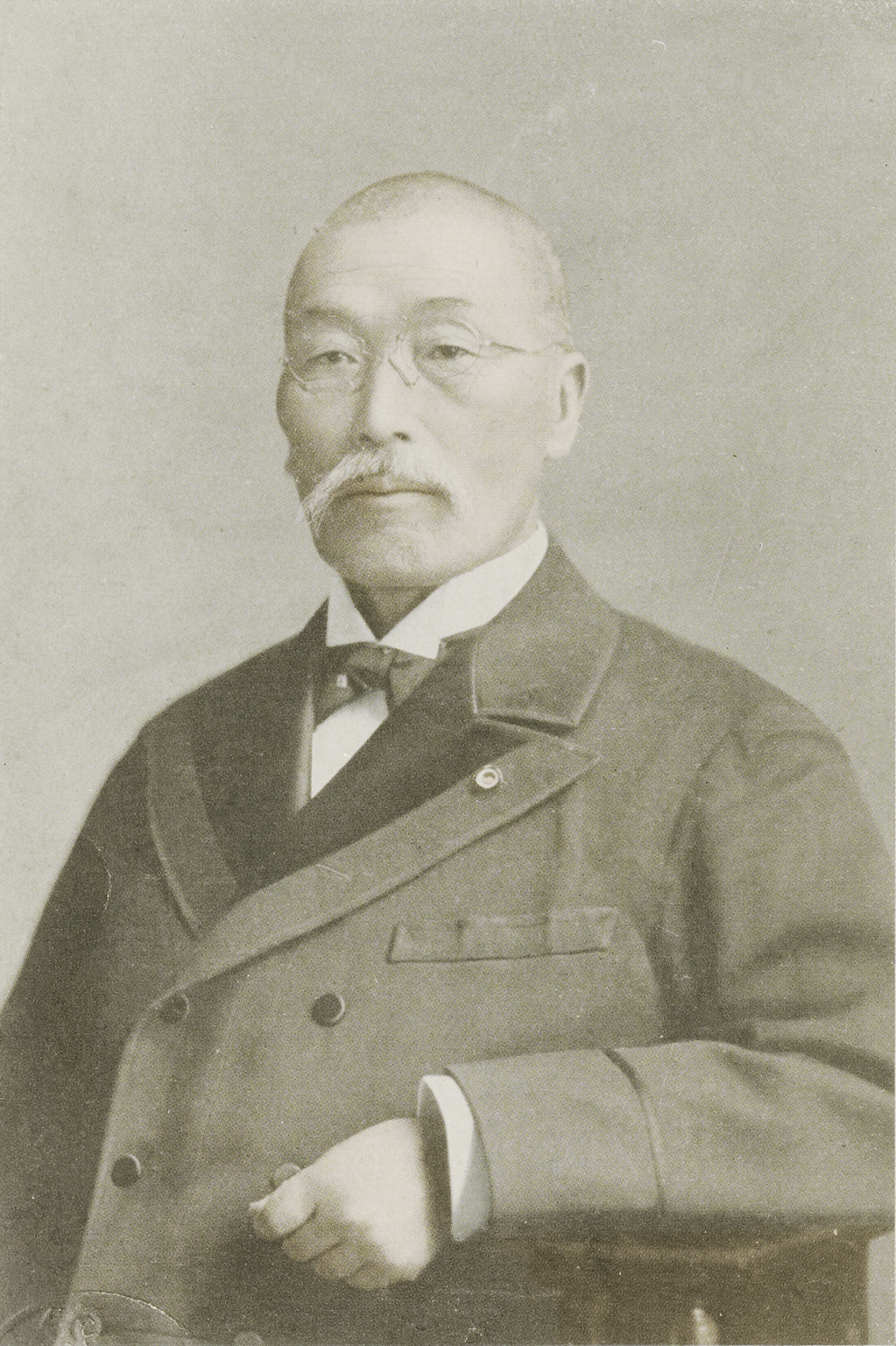

Member of the House of Representatives
- In office 1 July 1890 – 25 December 1891
- Preceded by: Constituency established
- Succeeded by: Tagaya Shinkei
- Constituency: Iwate 5th

Governor of Kanagawa Prefecture
- In office 17 August 1872 – 15 January 1874
- Monarch: Meiji
- Preceded by: Mutsu Munemitsu
- Succeeded by: Nakajima Nobuyuki

Personal details
- Born: 2 November 1847 Ōtsuki, Kōchi, Japan
- Died: 21 September 1921 (aged 73) Tokyo, Japan
- Party: Liberal
- Relatives: Gotō Shōjirō (father-in-law); Gotō Taketarō (brother-in-law); Iwasaki Yanosuke (brother-in-law)
- Known for: Maria Luz Incident

Ōe Taku (大江 卓; 2 November 1847 – 21 September 1921) was a samurai, bureaucrat, politician, entrepreneur and social activist in the late Meiji and Taishō period Empire of Japan. He is noted as one of the more progressive figures of the early Meiji period, although his record is complex. His wife was the younger daughter of Gotō Shōjirō.

== Biography ==
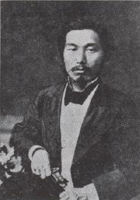
Ōe Taku at time of the Maria Luz Incident

Ōe was born in Hata District, Tosa Domain, what is now Ōtsuki, Kōchi. He grew up in Nagasaki, but towards the end of the Bakumatsu period returned to his native Tosa to join the Rikuentai, a paramilitary group of Tosa samurai supporting the Sonnō jōi movement and dedicated to the overthrow of the Tokugawa shogunate. His fellow members included Sakamoto Ryōma, Nakaoka Shintarō and Mutsu Munemitsu. In 1868, he participated in an attack against the foreign consulates in Kobe.

After the Meiji Restoration, Ōe left Tosa for Tokyo in 1871 and joined the new Meiji government. Somewhat ironically for his xenophobic background, he was assigned as a judge to assist Mutsu Munemitsu (who had been appointed governor of Kanagawa Prefecture) in the management of foreign affairs at the port of Yokohama. Ōe played a central role in the María Luz Incident, in which the Japanese government took steps to rescue 232 Chinese indentured laborers from a Peruvian ship, over the vehement protests by the Western nations. The incident also led to legislation in 1872, emancipating burakumin outcasts, prostitutes and other forms of bonded labor in Japan.

In 1877, Ōe returned to Tosa, in an attempt to encourage his countrymen to rise up against the central government in support of the Satsuma Rebellion. After the failure of the rebellion, he was arrested for treason, and sentenced to twelve years in prison.

Ōe returned to Tokyo in 1890, having been elected a member of the lower house in the Diet of Japan in the 1890 General Election as one of the founding members of the Liberal Party. He spoke out strongly against increasing government corruption, and the ever increasing military expenditures. He left the government in 1892 to become President of the Tokyo Stock Exchange. In 1899, he became one of the founders of the Keifu Railway Company, which aimed at establishing a railway connecting the Korean capital of Seoul with the southern port city of Busan.

However, in 1914, Ōe retired from all business and political activities, took the tonsure and became a Buddhist priest of the Sōtō Zen sect, and traveled around the country. In his final years, he became an outspoken proponent of ending all discrimination with regards to the burakumin outcasts. He died of stomach cancer in 1921; his grave was at the Aoyama Cemetery in Tokyo.
