= Japan–Peru relations =

- Japan: Peru

Diplomatic mission
- Embassy of Japan, Lima: Embassy of Peru, Tokyo

Japan–Peru relations are the historical and bilateral ties between Japan and the Republic of Peru. Both countries are members of the Asia-Pacific Economic Cooperation, Comprehensive and Progressive Agreement for Trans-Pacific Partnership, the Forum of East Asia–Latin America Cooperation, the World Trade Organization and the United Nations.

== History ==
=== Early relations ===
Early knowledge of Japan and Peru would have been through Spanish merchants who traded via the Manila Galleon from Acapulco, Mexico and Manila, Philippines as well as through Spanish missionaries. In Manila, the Spanish traded with Japanese merchants and brought their products to Spanish America (as Peru was part of the Spanish Empire at the time). In 1821, Peru declared its independence from Spain and in October 1868, Japan entered the Meiji period and began fostering diplomatic relations with several nations, after decades of isolation.

=== 19th century ===
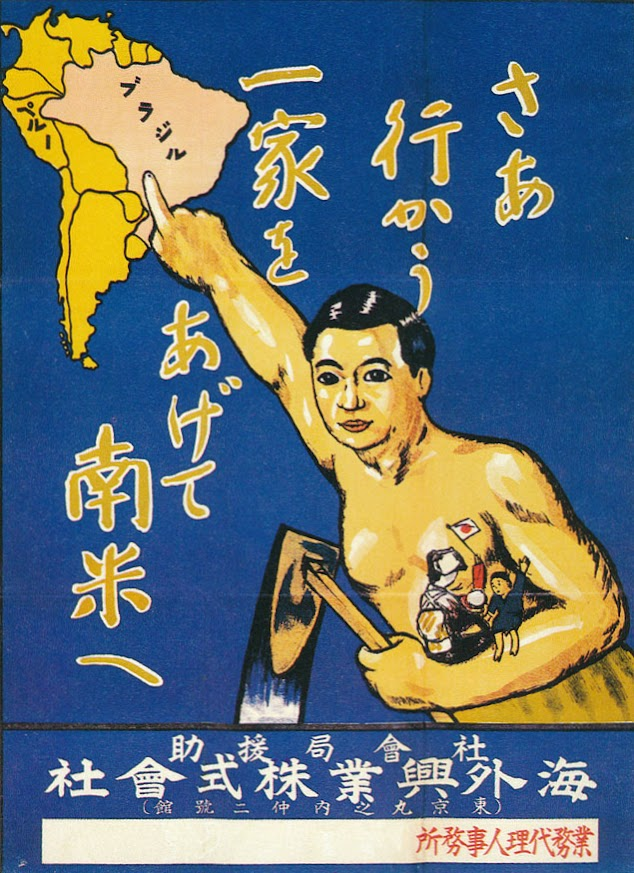
A poster was used to attract Japanese immigrants to Peru and Brazil. It reads: "Join your Family, Let's Go to South America."

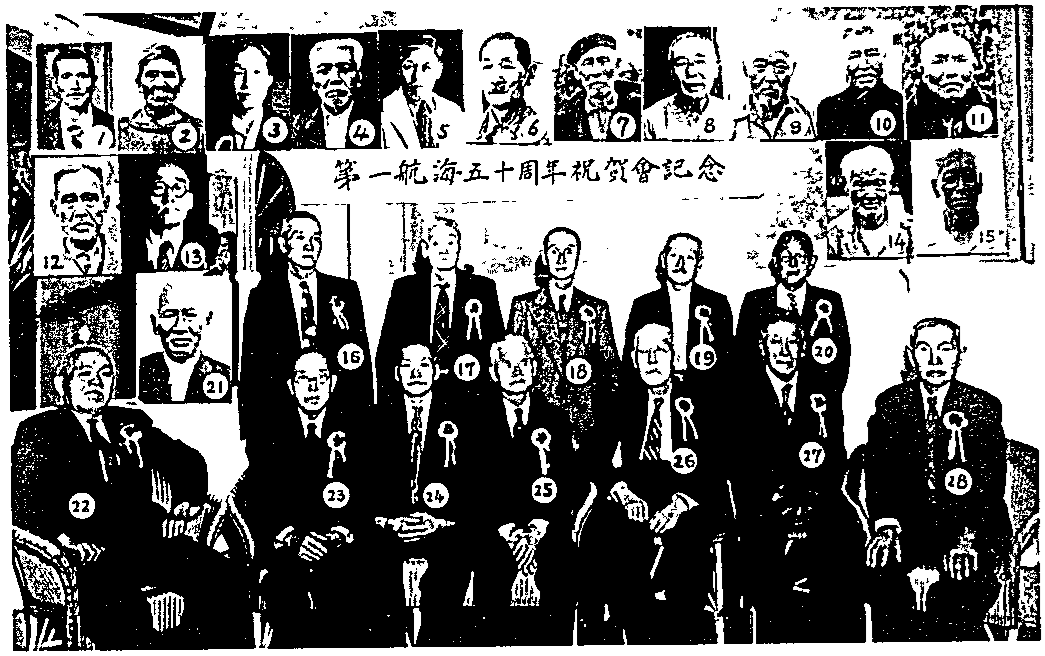
1949 photograph of the Sakura Maru's immigrants to Peru

Prior to establishing formal diplomatic relations; in June 1872, Japan and Peru had a diplomatic incident when a Peruvian ship called the María Luz set sail from Macau to Callao carrying 232 Chinese indentured labourers for Peruvian plantations. On the way to Peru, the ship encountered a severe storm which caused some damage to the ship and called on the Japanese port of Yokohama for repairs. At port, one Chinese laborer managed to escape and jumped to shore. Once on shore, the laborer complained about severe mistreatment and asked for protection and the rescue of his fellow laborers on board. After a second laborer escaped from the ship, Japanese authorities boarded the ship and discovered that the Chinese nationals were being confined against their will under inhumane conditions. Many had been kidnapped, and most had no idea of the location of their final destination. The Japanese courts charged the captain, Ricardo Herrera, of the María Luz with wrongdoing and in violation of international law and set free the Chinese nationals. A year later, in 1873, Japan and Peru formally established diplomatic relations by signing a Treaty of Friendship and Navigation.

In 1899, 790 Japanese migrants, aboard the Sakuramaru arrived to Peru. Most of the migrants came to the country to work on the various plantations. By 1936, 23,000 Japanese migrants immigrated to Peru.

=== 20th century ===
==== Furuya Incident ====
As a result of the large-scale Japanese immigration to Peru, the Peruvian government had to implement a limit to the number of immigrants. However, this was not implemented. As a result, a monopoly among the 22,560 Japanese nationals, accounting for 46.7% of all foreigners in the country, began to develop in contrast to Peruvian businesses, leading to tension between Peruvians and the Japanese, as the former started to develop a dislike for the latter which peaked in the years preceding World War II. Japanese support for the Manchurian Incident and their athletes at the 1936 Summer Olympics did not assist in their situation.

The Japanese legation at the time had great authority over its subjects at the time, having the capacity to forcibly remove them if necessary. Nevertheless, it attempted to negotiate with the Peruvian government when it started cracking down on Japanese businesses due to their unsanitary conditions. Tokijiro Furuya, a Japanese national, managed to negotiate with Peruvian authorities and resist attempts by the Japanese Central Society so that his business could remain open. The latter had been part of an attempt to try and improve the public image of the Nikkei among nationals, also cracking down on unruly businesses and attempting to avoid a monopoly or the idea among locals of the existence of one.

After the Japanese Consul Shun Sato, who opposed the situation of Furuya's businesses, personally wrote a deportation request to Peruvian authorities, he received an answer by the Ministry of the Interior allowing Furuya's deportation. As a result, a crowd arrived at Furuya's house and forcibly removed him, taking him to Callao to be deported to Japan aboard the Ginyo Maru. The event left an unfavorable view of the Japanese by both the Peruvian government and press. The former expected the Consul to resign due to his poor handling of the situation, which did not happen.

==== 1940 Lima riots ====
In 1940, a series of race riots against the businesses of Japanese nationals took place, as their businesses were looted and the Japanese themselves attacked. The district of Jesús María was notably targeted due to its larger Japanese population, with the entire event causing an estimated loss of S/.7 million. The 1940 Lima earthquake took place during the events, worsening the situation.

==== World War II and aftermath ====
During World War II, Peruvians sacked, looted, and burned more than 600 Japanese homes and businesses in Lima, killing 10 Japanese and injuring dozens. In January 1942, Peru broke diplomatic relations with Japan over the Attack on Pearl Harbor. Soon afterwards, Peru deported over 1,700 Japanese Peruvians to the United States where they were placed in internment camps after growing pressure from the U.S. to secure Latin America from "dangerous enemy aliens." After the war, Peru re-established diplomatic relations with Japan and in 1959, Japanese Prime Minister Nobusuke Kishi paid an official visit to Peru. In 1961, Peruvian President Manuel Prado Ugarteche became the first Peruvian and Latin-American head of state to visit Japan.

==== Presidency of Alberto Fujimori ====
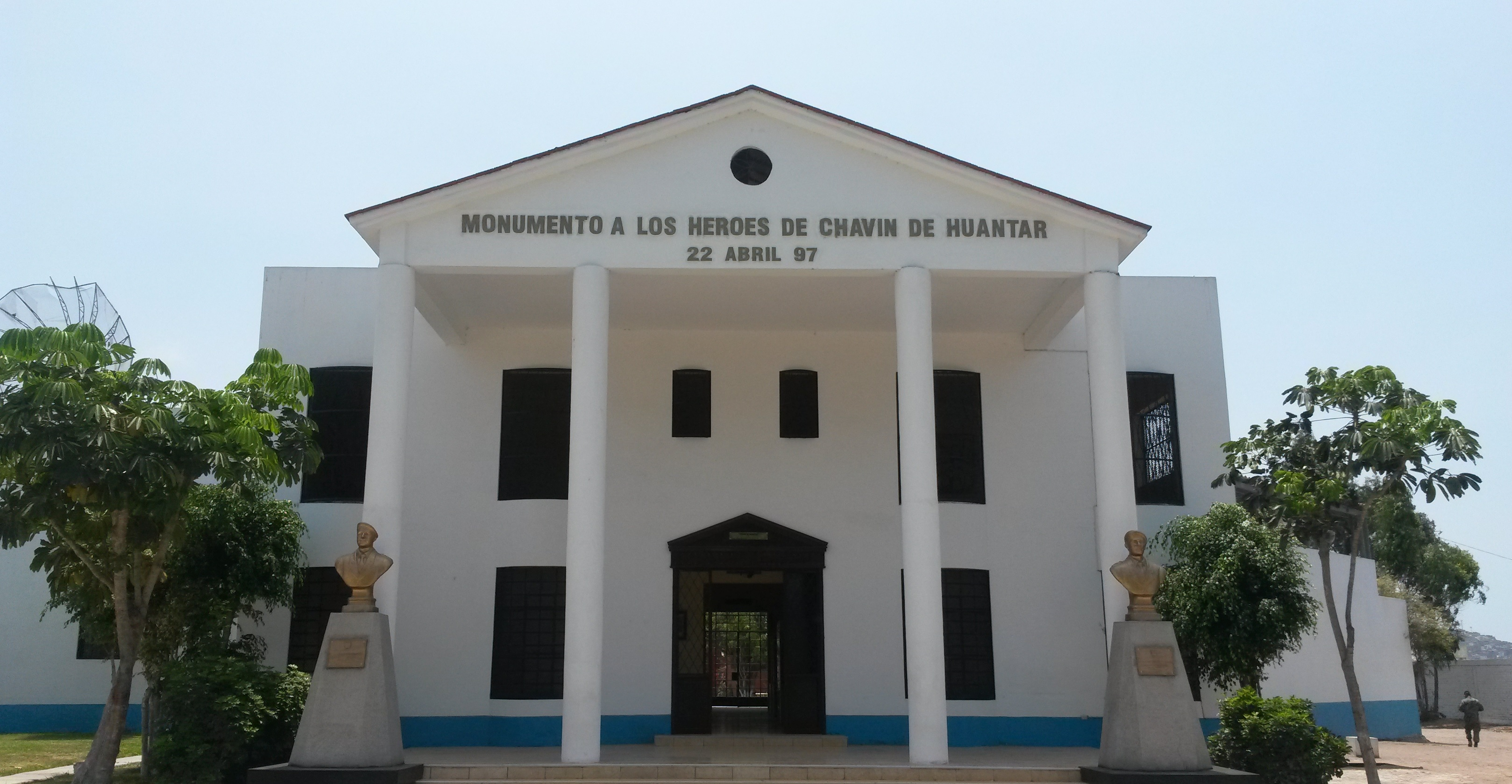
Monument to the Japanese embassy hostage crisis in Lima

In July 1990, Alberto Fujimori became the first Peruvian President of Japanese origin. Some months after President Fujimori's election, several Japanese and Peruvians of Japanese origin were assaulted, kidnapped or killed by Peru's two main guerrilla groups, the Shining Path and the Túpac Amaru Revolutionary Movement. In 1992, President Fujimori paid a visit to Japan.

On 17 December 1996, 14 members of the Túpac Amaru Revolutionary Movement stormed the Japanese Ambassador's residence in Lima as they were celebrating Japanese Emperor Akihito's 63rd birthday, and took hostage more than 400 diplomatic, governmental and military officials. The insurgents believed that President Fujimori would be in attendance at the party. When they discovered that he was not present, they demanded from the Peruvian government the release of 300 jailed comrades. The incident became known as the Japanese embassy hostage crisis and lasted until 22 April 1997 when Peruvian commandos entered the residence and killed all 14 insurgents. During the siege, supreme court judge Carlos Giusti died in the operation and two soldiers were killed. Japanese Prime Minister, Ryutaro Hashimoto, thanked Peru for the release of the hostages

In November 2000, President Fujimori flew to Brunei to attend the 12th APEC summit. After the summit, he flew to Japan and faxed his resignation of the Presidency as a corruption scandal was collapsing his government. In Japan, Fujimori requested and was granted Japanese citizenship based on his origins. The Peruvian government, under President Alejandro Toledo requested Japan to extradite Fujimori to face 20 criminal charges, however, Japan refused to extradite one of its citizens, which harmed relations between both nations. In 2006, Fujimori left Japan and flew to Mexico and to Chile where he was arrested; he had been trying to return to Peru to run for President.

In the 1990s, Japan changed their immigration law and allowed the return of "Dekasegi" (people of Japanese origin born abroad) to return to Japan and receive permanent residency. Approximately 60,000 Peruvians of Japanese descent left the country for Japan, making them the second largest Latin American community in Japan (after Brazil).

=== 21st century ===
In 2013, Japan and Peru celebrated 140 years of diplomatic relations. From 2017 to 2021, the embassy's building, a traditional building in Jesús María, was revamped during a five-year period.

== High-level visits ==
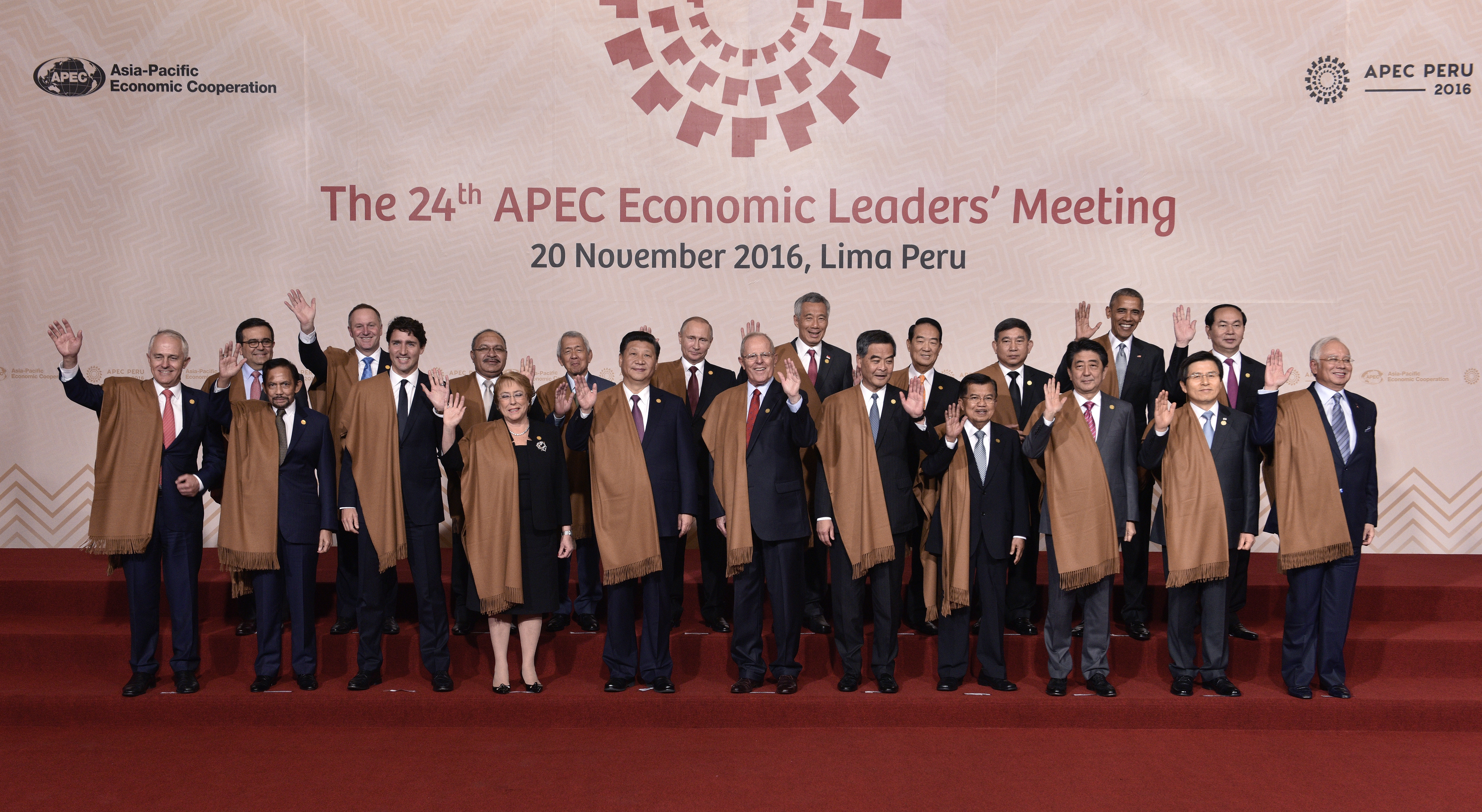
Japanese Prime Minister Shinzō Abe attending the 28th APEC Summit in Peru hosted by Peruvian President Pedro Pablo Kuczynski; November 2016.

High-level visits from Japan to Peru

- Prince Takahito (1958)
- Prime Minister Nobusuke Kishi (1959)
- Crown Prince Akihito (1963, 1967)
- Prime Minister Zenkō Suzuki (1982)
- Prime Minister Ryutaro Hashimoto (1996, 1997)
- Princess Sayako Kuroda (1999)
- Prime Minister Tarō Asō (2008)
- Prince Masahito (2009)
- Prince Fumihito (2014)
- Prime Minister Shinzō Abe (2016)
- Princess Mako (2019)
- Princess Kako (2023)
- Prime Minsiter Shigeru Ishiba (2024)

High-level visits from Peru to Japan

- President Manuel Prado Ugarteche (1961)
- President Alberto Fujimori (1992, 1995)
- President Alan García (2008, 2009, 2010)
- President Ollanta Humala (2012)
- President Dina Boluarte (2025)
- President Keiko Fujimori (2026)

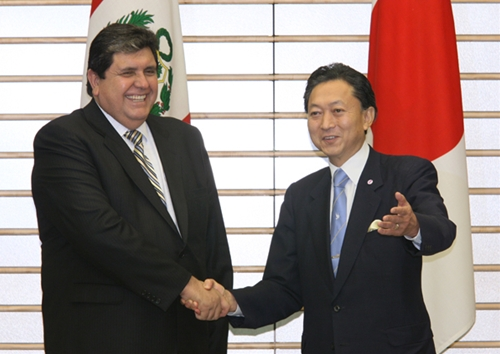
President Alan García and Prime Minister Yukio Hatoyama in Tokyo; November 2009.

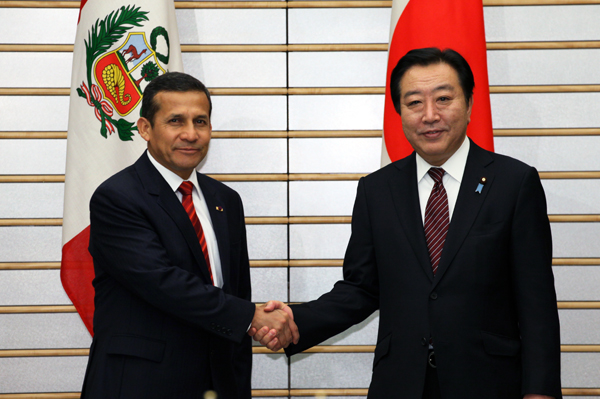
President Ollanta Humala and Prime Minister Yoshihiko Noda in Tokyo; May 2012.

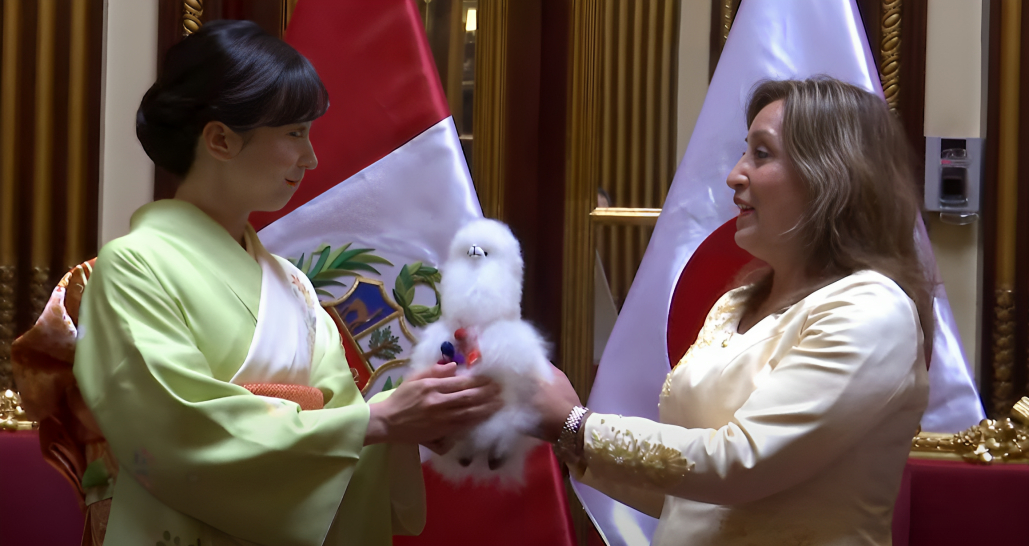
Princess Kako and President Dina Boluarte in Lima; November 2023.

== Bilateral relations ==
Japan and Peru have signed several bilateral agreements/treaties such as a Trade and Financial Agreement (1949); Agreement on the elimination of visas (1971); Technical Cooperation Agreement (1979); Cooperation Agreement on Agriculture Development (1987); Agreement on the Promotion and Protection of Investments (2008); and an Agreement on Japanese donations on the protection of Peruvian Archeological sites (2016).

== Trade ==
In 2013, trade between Japan and Peru totaled US$3.5 billion. Japan's main exports to Peru include automobiles, auto parts, tires and steel; ane Peru's main exports to Japan include copper, fish meal, silver and zinc. That same year, Japanese direct investment in Peru totaled US$238 million. Several well known multinational Japanese companies such as Honda, Sony, Toshiba and Toyota (among others) operate in Peru. In 2010, Japan and Peru signed an Economic Partnership Agreement. Both nations were party to the Trans-Pacific Partnership.

Japanese cultural and media exports to Peru include anime, J-pop, video games, language education, and food, all of which have had a significant impact on many young Peruvians.

== Resident diplomatic missions ==
of Japan in Peru

- Lima (Embassy)

of Peru in Japan

- Tokyo (Embassy)
- Tokyo (Consulate-General)
- Nagoya (Consulate-General)

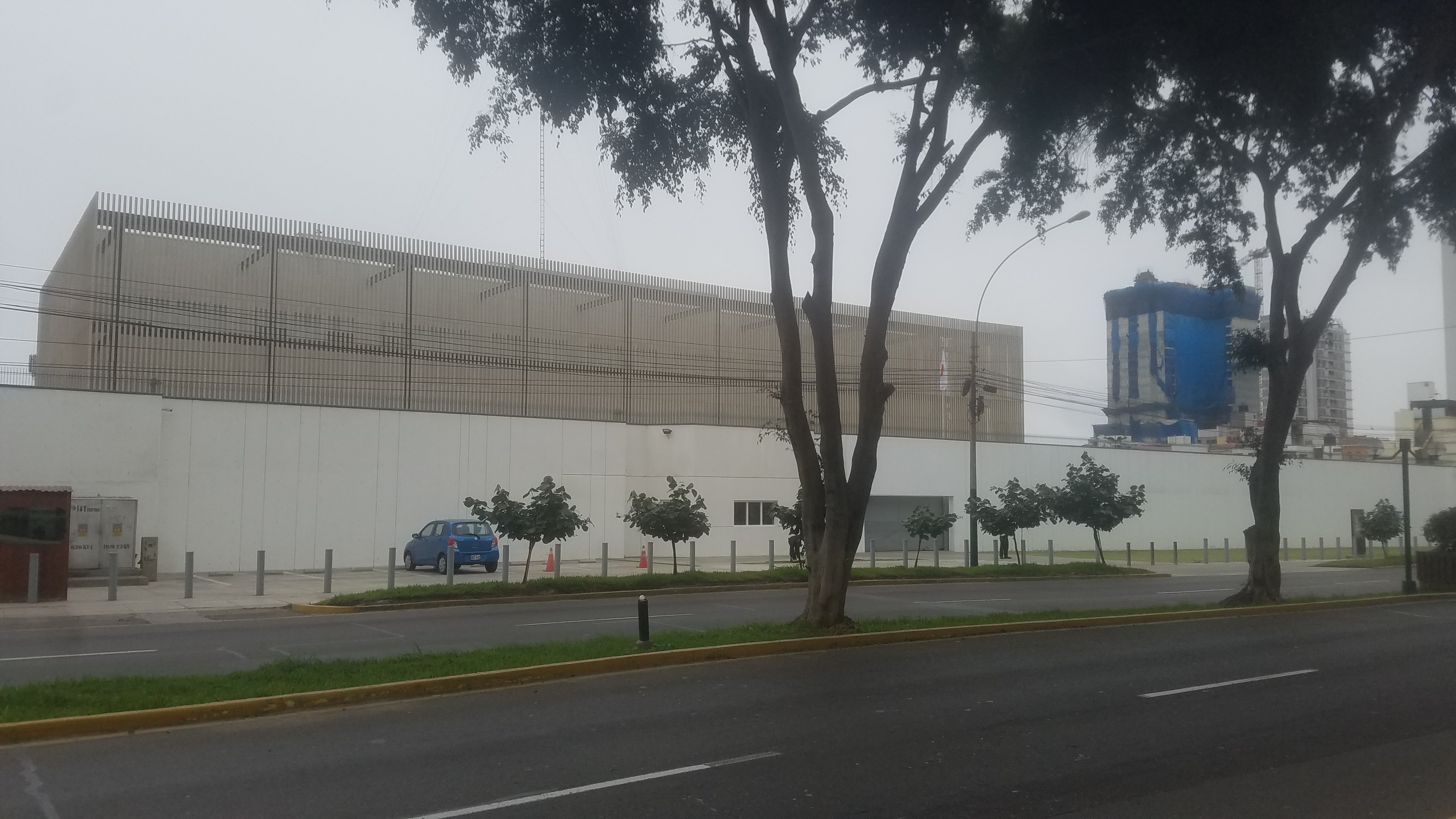
Embassy of Japan in Lima

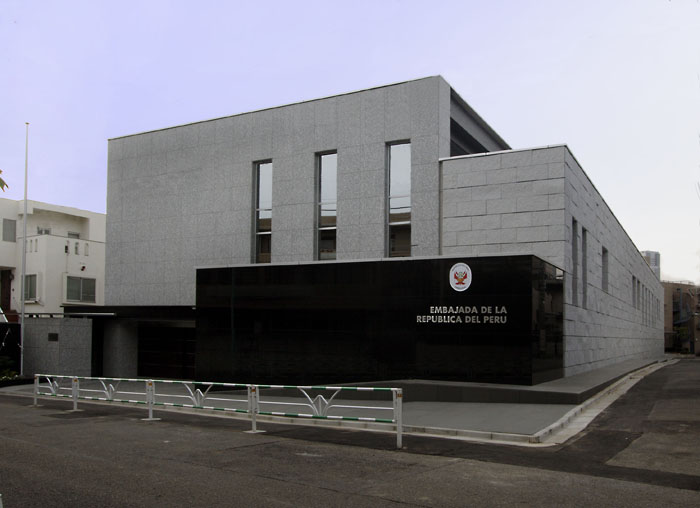
Embassy of Peru in Tokyo

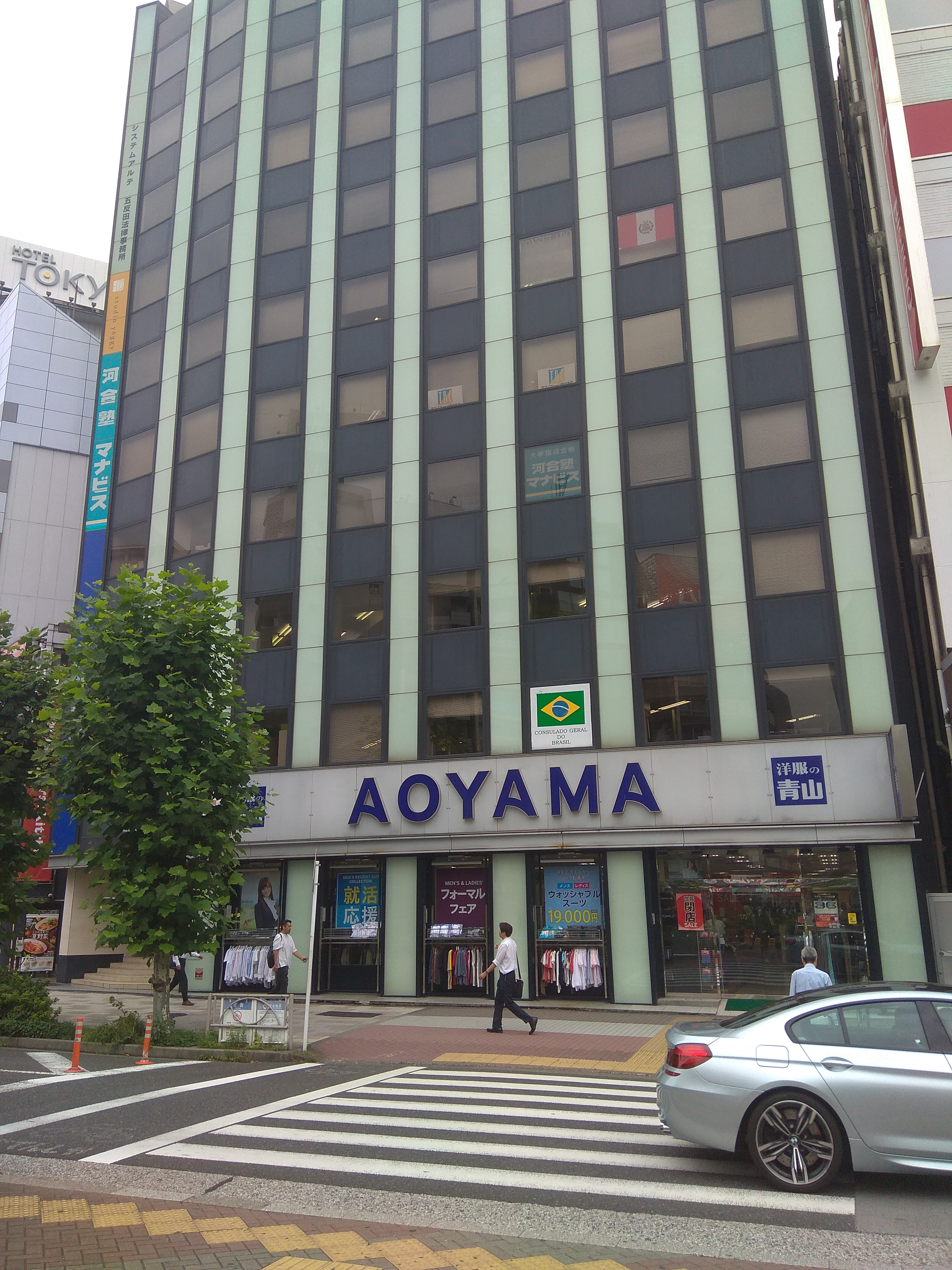
Consulate-General of Peru in Tokyo

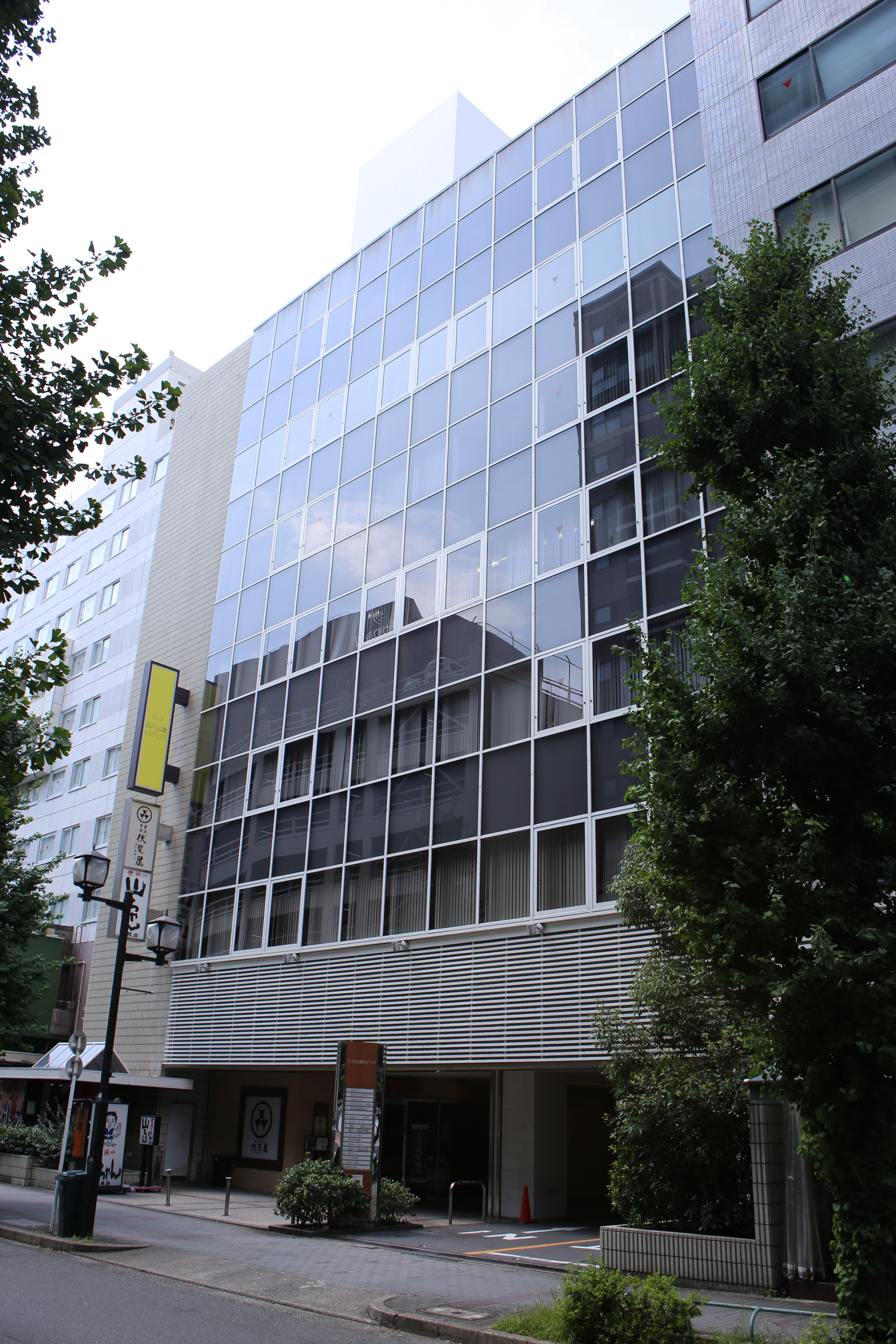
Consulate-General of Peru in Nagoya

== See also ==
- Japanese embassy hostage crisis
- Japanese Peruvians
- María Luz Incident
- Peruvian migration to Japan
- List of ambassadors of Peru to Japan
- List of ambassadors of Japan to Peru
