= Mutsu Hirokichi =

Japanese diplomat and educator (1869–1942)

Mutsu Hirokichi 陸奥 広吉
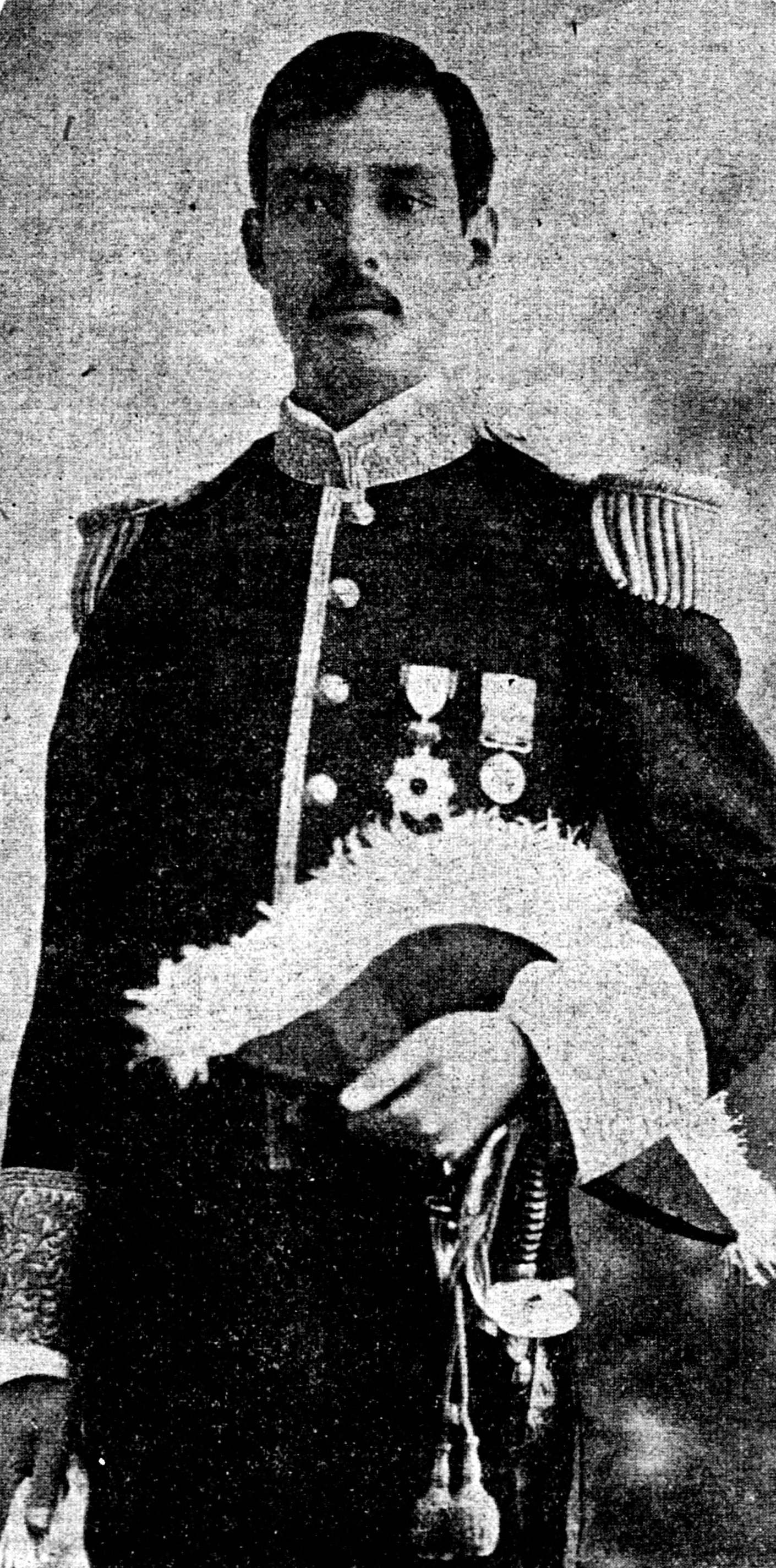
- Mutsu in 1899
- Born: March 5, 1869; Japan
- Died: 1942 (aged 72–73); Kamakura, Japan
- Occupation(s): Diplomat, Educator
- Spouse: Mutsu Iso
- Children: Mutsu Ian Younosuke, Mutsu Sonna

Count Mutsu Hirokichi (陸奥 広吉; March 5, 1869 – November 19, 1942) was a Japanese diplomat and an educator in Meiji- and Taishō-period Japan.

He was the oldest son of Mutsu Munemitsu who was Minister for Foreign Affairs. He was sent to the U.K. to study in 1887 as a barrister and by 1895 was appointed to diplomatic positions, residing in London, Washington, DC and Rome. While in Europe he met Gertrude Ethel Passingham whom he later married in 1905. She took the Japanese name Mutsu Iso and followed him back to Japan 1910 where she created a name for herself as a writer.

Mutsu was again called upon to serve as a diplomat in 1914 and was appointed Envoy to Brussels but with failing health he retired to Kamakura in Kanagawa Prefecture until his death in 1942. Count Mutsu and his wife were financial sponsors of Kamakura-jo-gakkō, a girl's high school in Kamakura (now Kamakura-jo-gakuin girl's junior high and high school), and exerted themselves to conserve historic site.

== Family tree ==
Count Mutsu Munemitsu	Countess Mutsu Ryōko
Countess Iso Mutsu	Count Mutsu Hirokichi
Ian Mutsu
Sonna Mutsu
