= List of ambassadors of Peru to Japan =

Ambassador of Peru to the State of Japan
- Great Seal of Peru
- Ministry of Foreign Affairs; 2-3-1, Hiroo, Shibuya–ku, Tokyo
- Appointer: The president of Peru
- Inaugural holder: Aurelio García y García
- Formation: November 1872
- Website: Embassy of Peru in Japan

The extraordinary and plenipotentiary ambassador of Peru to the State of Japan is the official representative of the Republic of Peru to Japan. Until 1971, the ambassador to Japan was also accredited to China.

Both countries established relations in 1873, and 790 Japanese immigrants arrived in Peru 20 years later in 1899. Today, Peru has the second largest Japanese population in Latin America after Brazil.

Relations have been warm, although incidents have occurred. Before the establishment of relations, a diplomatic incident occurred between both countries, and after Alberto Fujimori (whose presidency was marked by events such as the Japanese embassy hostage crisis) faxed his resignation to the Presidency of Peru, Japan refused to extradite him as he had become a Japanese citizen, only arrested in Chile after his attempt to return to Peru. Peru severed relations with Japan only once, in January 1942, due to the Attack on Pearl Harbor during World War II.

== List of ambassadors ==
Name	Portrait	Term begin	Term end	President	Notes
Aurelio García y García		November 1872	1874	Manuel Pardo	Appointed as Envoy Extraordinary to deal with the María Luz incident. Under his tenure, Peru and Japan established relations in 1873.
Manuel Elías Bonnemaison		August 9, 1929	October 1936	Augusto B. Leguía	Also accredited to China.
Ricardo Rivera Schreiber		1936	1941	Óscar R. Benavides	As Minister plenipotenciary, also accredited to China. Relations with Japan were severed in January 1942.
Julio Fernández Dávila		1957	1960	Manuel Prado Ugarteche	As Envoy Extraordinary and Minister Plenipotentiary, then first Ambassador to Japan.
Aníbal Ponce Sobrevilla		January 6, 1961	March 11, 1965	Manuel Prado y Ugarteche	Also accredited to China.
José Carlos Ferreyros Balta		July 18, 1966	1969	Nicolás Lindley López	Also accredited to China.
José Carlos Mariátegui Arellano		1971	1974	Juan Velasco Alvarado	
César Espejo Romero		1979	July 1, 1981	Francisco Morales Bermúdez	
Luis José Macchiavello Amorós		1985	1989	Alan García	
Víctor Hiroshi Aritomi Shinto		August 15, 1991	November 22, 2000	Alberto Fujimori	
Luis José Macchiavello Amorós		February 2001	2005	Valentín Paniagua	
Hugo Ernesto Palma Valderrama		2006	2008	Alan García	
Juan Carlos Capuñay Chávez		2009	2011	Alan García	
Elard Alberto Escala Sánchez-Barreto		2011	2017	Ollanta Humala	
Harold Forsyth		2017	May 27, 2021	Pedro Pablo Kuczynski	
Roberto Hernán Seminario Portocarrero		December 6, 2021	December 7, 2022	Pedro Castillo	

== See also ==
- List of ambassadors of Peru to China
