= María Luz incident =

1872 Japan-Peru diplomatic incident

The María Luz incident (マリア・ルス号事件, Maria-Rusu-Gō Jiken) was a diplomatic incident between the early Meiji government of the Empire of Japan and the Republic of Peru over a merchant ship holding Chinese indentured labourers in slavery-like conditions in Yokohama in 1872. It was an early test of the independence of the Japanese judiciary system and a challenge to the extraterritoriality provisions of the unequal treaties then in force between Japan and the western powers.

== History ==
On July 9, 1872, the María Luz, a Peruvian cargo ship en route from Macao to Callao, Peru, with a cargo of Chinese indentured labourers for Peruvian plantations, called on the treaty port of Yokohama, Japan, to repair damage suffered during a severe storm. While anchored at Yokohama, one Chinese coolie aboard escaped by jumping overboard and swimming to the nearby British warship HMS Iron Duke. When he was turned over to Japanese authorities at Yokohama port, he complained about severe mistreatment and asked for protection and the rescue of 231 other Chinese aboard who were suffering from the same fate. The captain of the María Luz, Ricardo Herrera, was summoned by Japanese authorities and strongly admonished to treat the escapee with leniency and to take better care of his indentured charges.

However, another Chinese indentured labourer soon escaped, and word reached acting British consul Robert Grant Watson that the first escapee had been brutally treated by the Peruvian captain on his return to the ship. Together with a boarding party of British Marines, Watson personally inspected the vessel, and found that the rumor was true, and that the Chinese passengers were being treated in conditions similar to slavery. Watson formally approached Japanese Foreign Minister Soejima Taneomi to take action.

The Japanese government was initially hesitant to take action, as Japan had no formal diplomatic relations with Peru, whose interests in Japan were being handled by the United States. Kanagawa governor Mutsu Munemitsu was strongly opposed to any intervention which might damage Japanese relations with the western nations; however, Justice Minister Etō Shimpei felt that, for humanitarian reasons, the issue could not be ignored. The head of the State Council, Sanjō Sanetomi, authorized Soejima to proceed, and Mutsu resigned his position in protest.

Soejima took steps to prevent the María Luz from leaving port, and after reviewing the ship's records and interviewing the officers, found that its cargo of illiterate indentured laborers had been deceived in Macao into signing contracts, the contents of which they could not read or understand, and were being confined against their will under inhumane conditions. Many had been kidnapped, and most had no idea of the location of their final destination. At a preliminary hearing presided over by Ōe Taku, a court order allowing the Chinese to go ashore at Yokohama was issued, and the court declared that the shipping company owning the María Luz was guilty of wrongdoing. All of the foreign countries represented in Japan at the time were informed of the decision and their opinions were solicited.

However, every country with the exception of the United Kingdom responded negatively, charging that Japan had overstepped the bounds of various treaties to rule against a foreign company and foreign captain. In addition, the incident had arisen within the borders of Yokohama, which was at the center of the extraterritorial zone granted by treaty. Ōe turned to Soejima, who upheld the court's decision despite foreign opposition and charges of lack of jurisdiction, and on August 30, Ōe ruled that the Chinese labourers were freed of their contracts.

Herrera challenged the decision in an appeal with English barrister F.V. Dickins (who was fluent in classical Japanese and a translator of Japanese poetry) as his legal advisor. Dickins countered with the argument that involuntary servitude was practiced in Japan in the form of the sale of prostitutes and in the contractual debts of apprenticeship, and was thus not illegal. He further charged that since the Chinese labourers had been hired in Macao, the case fell within the jurisdiction of Portugal due to extraterritoriality agreements between Japan and Portugal, and was supported in this stance by letters from the Portuguese ambassador to Japan. However, Dickens' arguments were not accepted by Ōe, and he lost in a court decision on September 26, with the Japanese judge ruling that the Peruvian captain and contractor were in violation of international law, and not Japanese law. After the ruling, Herrera fled from Yokohama to Shanghai on another vessel, abandoning the María Luz at Yokohama.

The Qing dynasty Chinese government issued an official letter thanking the Japanese government for its strong stance and assistance rendered to Chinese subjects. However, most European nations remained displeased with the court's rulings, and supported official diplomatic protests from the Peruvian government. In June 1873, the Japanese government requested that Tsar Alexander II of Russia arbitrate the issue as a neutral party, and in 1875, he confirmed Japan's position.

== Significance ==
The María Luz incident was a diplomatic victory for Japan in asserting itself against the unequal treaties. The outcome of the incident accelerated the decline of the "coolie trade" in Peru and elsewhere. In Japan, the incident also led to new legislation in late 1872, emancipating burakumin outcasts, prostitutes, and other bonded laborers in Japan.

A recent article by historian Bill Mihalopoulos has challenged the view of the María Luz incident as an early milestone in human rights emancipation. Mihalopoulos argues that the court hearings presided over by Ōe Taku did not center on emancipating the Chinese laborers. Instead, drawing on the legal protocols of prize law and abolitionist mixed commissions established to suppress the transatlantic slave trade, the court primarily focused on determining ownership and control over the laborers' labour.

Additionally, Mihalopoulos contends that the emancipation of Japanese licensed prostitutes following the trial was an unintended byproduct of legal strategy. To assert jurisdiction, British representatives and Japanese authorities relied on a legal fiction: that the Japanese legal system was inherently compatible with British common law regarding employment contracts. The subsequent 1872 decree releasing licensed prostitutes from their debt contracts was designed to align Japanese law with this assertion. According to Mihalopoulos, attempting to graft Anglo-American concepts of individual consent onto traditional Japanese indenture contracts (nenki hōkō) forced Meiji administrators into an encounter with a core, unresolved dilemma of liberalism: whether the terms of an employment contract override a person's basic right not to be held in conditions resembling slavery.

== See also ==
- Terashima Munenori, key negotiator for Japan during the incident
- Chinese Peruvian
- Japan–Peru relations

== Reference and further reading ==
- Clark, Douglas (2015). Gunboat Justice: British and American Law Courts in China and Japan (1842-1943), Vol 1, Ch. 10. Hong Kong: Earnshaw Books. ISBN 978-988-82730-8-9.
- Downer, Leslie (2002). Women of the Pleasure Quarters: The Secret History of the Geisha. Broadway. ISBN 0-7679-0490-7.
- Erdstrom, Burt (2002). Turning Points in Japanese History. RoutledgeCurzon. ISBN 1-903350-05-0.
- Keene, Donald (2005). Emperor of Japan: Meiji and His World, 1852–1912. Columbia University Press. ISBN 0-231-12341-8.
