= Hirohito Ōta =

Japanese writer and Zen monk (1970–2018)

Hirohito Ōta (太田宏人, ōta hirohito; April 1, 1970 – 2018) was a Japanese freelance writer and Zen monk.

Hirohito was a researcher of Japanese graves and missionary history in South America with a focus on Peru. He was the Japanese editor for the Japanese-language Peru newspaper Peru Shinpō. He graduated from Kokugakuin University with a degree in Shintō studies. He was devoted to the study of Suika Shintō, a branch of Shintō developed by Yamazaki Ansai, religious sociality, and the religious activities of Lafcadio Hearn.

Many of his articles dealt with Japanese Peruvians, Japanese Buddhism, and Peruvians in Japan.

== Publications ==
- Sōtōshū Jion-ji (perū kyōwakoku) ihai list
- Shirarezaru Nihonjin
- Nombres en japonés - Nihongo no Namae
