= Date Munehiro =

Japanese samurai, writer and historian

Date Chihiro
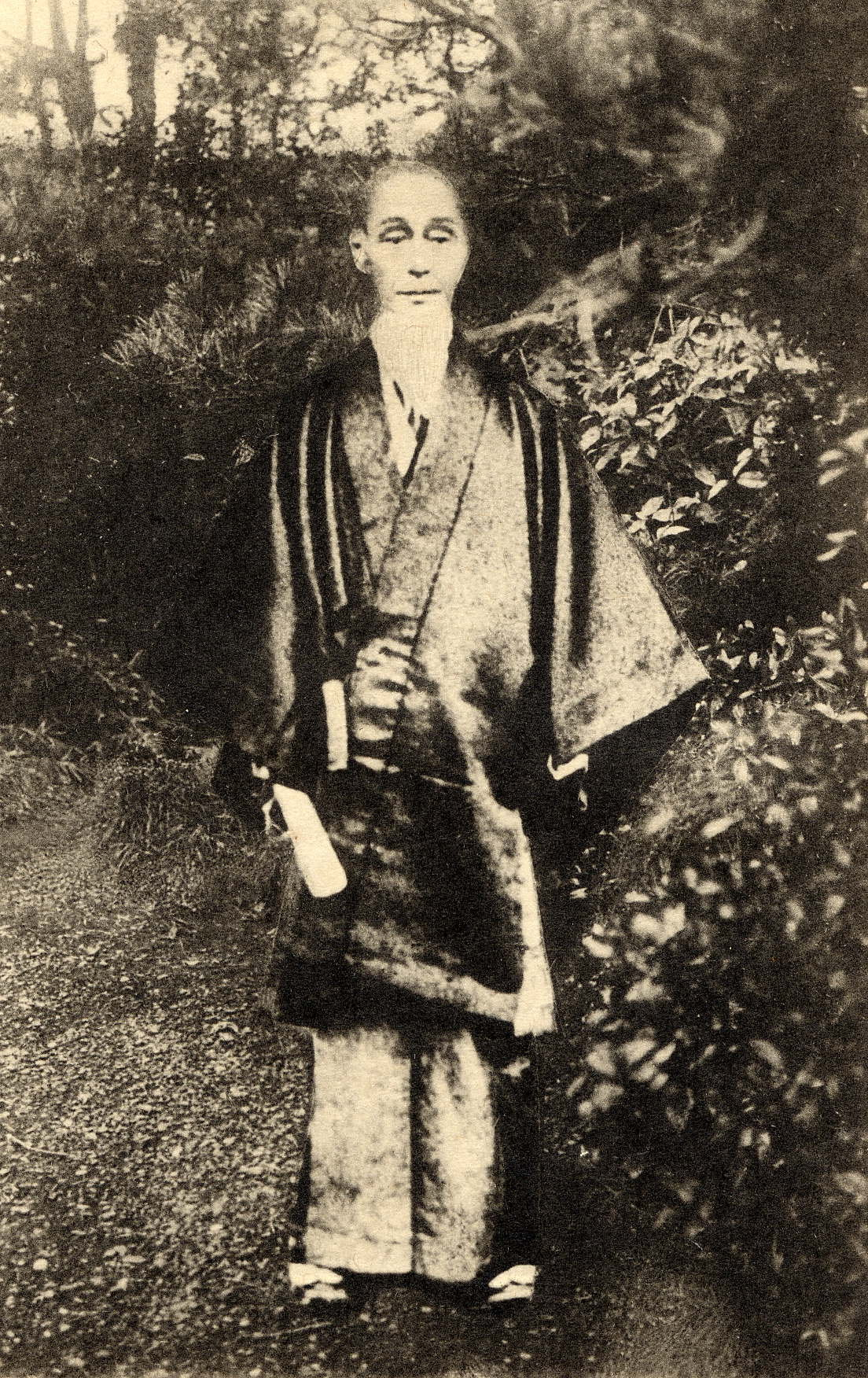
- Born: May 24, 1802; Japan
- Died: May 18, 1877 (aged 74)
- Other names: 伊達 千広, 伊達 宗広
- Occupation: Scholar of Kokugaku
- Children: Mutsu Munemitsu

Date Munehiro or Chihiro (Japanese:伊達 宗広 or 千広; June 24, 1802 – May 18, 1877) was a Japanese samurai of Kii Domain and Scholar of Kokugaku, living during the late Edo and early Meiji periods. He was father of Mutsu Munemitsu (陸奥 宗光). His penname was Jitoku (自得).

== Life ==
In 1802, he was born the son of Usami Sukenaga (宇佐美 祐長), a samurai of Kii Domain, and he became an adoptive son of his uncle, Date Moriaki (伊達 盛明). He inherited a patrimony by 12 years old, and was appointed "Kansatsu (監察)" by 18 years old. He assisted Karō of Kii Domain, and promoted the reform of that domain, and took the lead in the Sonnō jōi movement. In 1852, he was arrested by an opponent for his dangerous Sonnō jōi activity and was imprisoned for nearly 10 years in the town of Tanabe (紀伊 田辺). In 1861, he was released by the agency of Yamanouchi Yōdō (山内 容堂), who was a daimyō of Tosa Domain (土佐). He transferred his patrimony to his adoptive son, Date Muneoki (伊達 宗興) and retired. But he returned to the Sonnō jōi movement with Muneoki. They were arrested by Kii Domain officials, and were imprisoned again in 1865. After the Meiji Restoration, he was released in 1869. In his later years, he lived in Fukagawa, Tokyo with his son, Mutsu Munemitsu.

== Works and books ==
Almost all of Date Munehiro's works were formed while in confinement. He learned at Motoori Ōhira (本居大平) when he was young. He despised Buddhism because he was a very active person. But when he was imprisoned in Kii Tanabe, he borrowed the Issai-Sūtra (一切経) from a temple in the neighborhood and read it every day. One day he experienced Buddhist enlightenment.

- "Taisei Santenkō": Japanese name (大勢三転考) The essay on history
- "Waka zenwa": Japanese name (和歌禅話) It explains Buddhism in the form of a Waka
- "Manimani Gusa": Japanese name (随々草) Essays on Buddhism, waka poetry, and Chinese poetry
- "Yomigaeri": Japanese name (余身帰) Essays and memoirs
- "Zui En syū": Japanese name (随縁集) Anthology of waka poems
- "Kareno syū": Japanese name (枯野集) Essays on history and literature
- "Date Jitoku Ō Zen syū": Japanese name (伊達自得翁全集) His complete works published in 1926

== See also ==
- Date clan
