= Morihisa Aoki =

Japanese diplomat (1938–2024)

- 青木 盛久
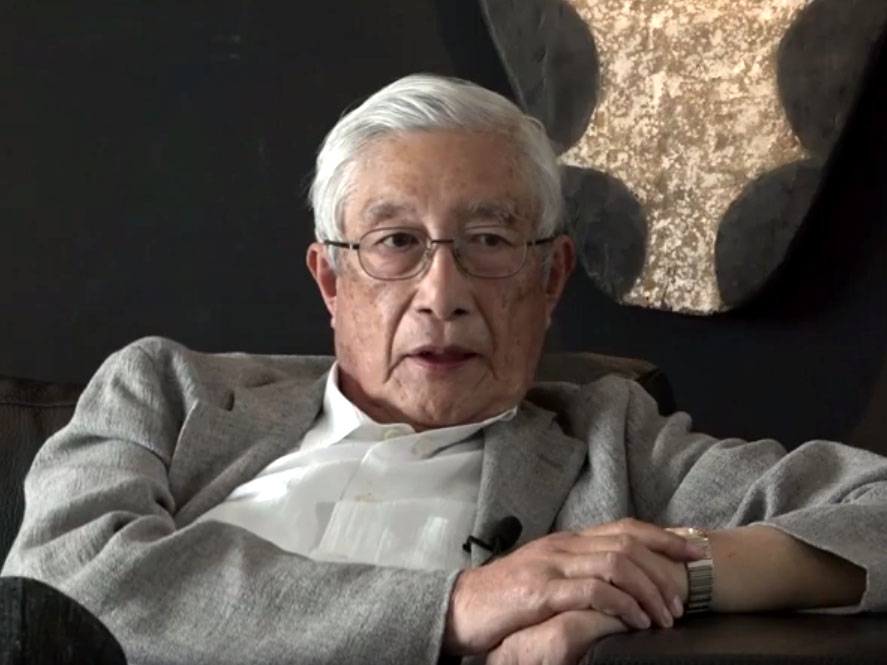
- Aoki in 2017

Japanese ambassador to Peru
- In office 1994–1997
- Monarch: Akihito
- Prime Minister: Ryutaro Hashimoto
- Preceded by: Masaki Seo
- Succeeded by: Konishi Yoshizo

Personal details
- Born: November 23, 1938 Nasushiobara, Tochigi, Empire of Japan
- Died: November 9, 2024 (aged 85) Ōta City, Tokyo, Japan
- Occupation: Diplomat

Morihisa Aoki (Japanese: 青木 盛久, romanized: Aoki Morihisa, November 23, 1938 – November 9, 2024) was a Japanese diplomat and president of the Aoki Shūzō Memorial Scholarship Foundation.

Aoki was the ambassador to Peru and homeowner of the diplomatic residence that served as the location of the Japanese embassy hostage crisis.

== Early life ==
Aoki was born in Nasushiobara, Tochigi Prefecture. His father was Morio Aoki, a diplomat who served as Ambassador Extraordinary and Plenipotentiary of Japan to the International Organizations in Geneva and Ambassador Extraordinary and Plenipotentiary of Japan to South Vietnam. His maternal grandfather was Yotaro Sugimura, who served as Under-Secretary-General of the League of Nations, Ambassador to France, and IOC member. His great-grandfather was Shuzo Aoki, who served as Minister of Foreign Affairs during the Meiji period.

After that, he moved to Kanagawa Prefecture, where he attended Eiko Gakuen Junior and Senior High School before graduating from the University of Tokyo's Faculty of Law in 1963. In 1962, while still enrolled at the same school, he passed the advanced civil service examination, and entered the Ministry of Foreign Affairs in 1963 after graduation.

== Diplomatic career ==
After entering the ministry, Aoki studied French at the University of Dijon, and in 1965 became the third secretary of the Embassy of Japan in France, later working in the Japanese embassies in Vietnam and the United States. In 1984, he became the Consul General of Japan in Hong Kong and in the same year, he became a minister of the Permanent Mission of Japan to the United Nations. In 1987, he was a minister to the Philippines and Consul General of Manila. In 1990 he served as secretary-general and as a director of the Japan International Cooperation Agency. In 1994 he was appointed Ambassador Extraordinary and Plenipotentiary to Peru.

== Japanese embassy hostage crisis ==
In November 1996, Aoki was taken captive in the occupation of the Japanese ambassador's residence in Peru by the Tupac Amaru Revolutionary Movement (MRTA), a far-left terrorist group in Peru. Initially, he asked the perpetrators to release all the other hostages with only him remaining, but his request was refused by the militants.

On April 22, 1997, the president of Peru, Alberto Fujimori, who had previously organised the construction of a tunnel to the ambassador's residence, ordered the execution of Operation Chavín de Huántar: the military operation in which a team of 142 commandos rushed the residence. Two members of the Special Forces and a hostage, a Peruvian Supreme Court judge, were killed during the attack. Aoki suffered serious injuries to his chest and legs during the rescue, but was rescued along with the hostage embassy staff, Peruvian government officials, and representatives of Japanese companies.

Public opinion of Aoki in Japan was mixed, leading to his resignation after the hostage crisis.

== Later life and death ==
In 1998, Aoki was appointed the ambassador extraordinary and plenipotentiary to Kenya. A month after his appointment, he witnessed the bombings of the United States embassies in Kenya and Tanzania. In August 2001, he received a severe reprimand on the grounds of improper receipt of various allowances by a staff member of the Embassy of Japan in Kenya. He became a pending ambassador, and later retired from the Ministry of Foreign Affairs.

After retiring from the Ministry of Foreign Affairs, he served as the executive director and vice chairman of the Japan Cooperation Volunteers Association. On May 23, 2005, he was interviewed by Ungirls and co-starred in Nippon Television's "Shinken". He was the president of Shuzo Aoki Memorial Scholarship Foundation and the director of Ashigin International Foundation. Aoki died on November 9, 2024, at the age of 85.

== See also ==
- Japanese embassy hostage crisis
