= Venancio Shinki =

Peruvian painter

- Born: April 1, 1932; Supe, Barranca, Lima, Peru
- Died: November 17, 2016 (aged 84)
- Education: National School of Fine Arts
- Known for: Abstract art
- Awards: Gold Medal and Special Painting Award “Sérvulo Gutiérrez” (1962); Tecnoquímica Bi-annual Award (1966); National Award Ignacio Merino from the Peruvian National Culture Institute (1967)

Venancio Shinki (April 1, 1932 – November 17, 2016) was a Peruvian painter. Born in Lima to a Japanese immigrant father from Hiroshima Prefecture and a Peruvian mother, Shinki was raised on the Hacienda San Nicolás in Supe, north of Lima.

== Education and career ==
When he was 15, Shinki traveled to Lima to work as a photographer apprentice, and at 21 he opened his own photographic studio. Over the years, he also worked as a professor in the Architecture Faculty of the UNI (Universidad Nacional de Ingenieria), as a graphic artist in the Expreso newspaper and as a public servant in the Ministry of Industry and Tourism.

He later enrolled at the National School of Fine Arts of Peru, where he was taught by, among others, Sabino Springuett, Ricardo Grau and Juan Manuel Ugarte Elespuru. He graduated as the valedictorian in 1962 and received the Sérvulo Gutiérrez award for painting. His work was inspired by travels through Ecuador, Mexico and Peru, as well as by artists like Hieronymus Bosch, El Greco, Paul Klee and Joan Miro. In addition, the paintings display influences from his Japanese Peruvian heritage, with a mixture of Eastern, Western and Andean themes, along with compositions and figures inspired by Surrealism.

He started participating in collective expositions in 1963. In 1966 he won the Teknoquimica award. In 1967 he received the National Award in Painting "Ignacio Merino" He has received many accolades and has participated in a variety of individual and group exhibits in Peru, Japan, Italy, the United States, Colombia, Ecuador, Brazil, Venezuela, Panama and Mexico, among others. He also participated in the VII and XII Bi-annual in São Paulo, Brazil; the II Bi-annual of American Art in Argentina; the I and II Bi-Annual in Havana, Cuba; and the Bi-annual in Quito, Ecuador.

In 1999, the year of the centenary marking Japanese migration to Peru, he was invited to exhibit his work in the Museum of Man in Nagoya, Japan. His works were displayed in November 2006 during the 34th Annual Japanese Cultural Week in Lima, Peru.

Shinki's painting "Lanzon" (1993) is owned by the Inter-American Development Bank. In 2013, some of his artworks were put up for sale in order to fund a project to form a children's symphony orchestra in Iquitos, Peru.

== Death ==
Shinki died on November 17, 2016, aged 84.
