= Mutsu Ryōko =

Japanese humanitarian

Countess Mutsu Ryōko 陸奥亮子
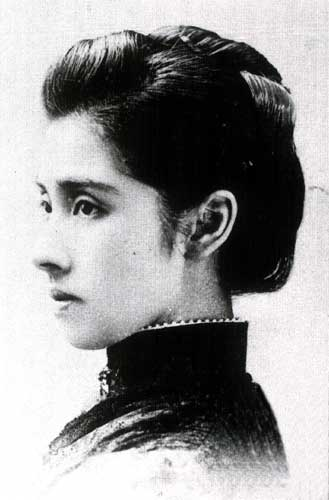
- Mutsu Ryōko in 1888 (aged 33)
- Born: November 1856; Edo, Japan
- Died: August 15, 1900 (aged 45)
- Occupation: Humanitarian
- Spouse: Mutsu Munemitsu

Countess Mutsu Ryōko (陸奥 亮子, November 1856 - August 15, 1900) was a Japanese noblewoman and humanitarian. She was a member of the Japanese Red Cross Society and the wife of Count Mutsu Munemitsu. She was called "the flower of Washington society" for her beauty and intelligence.

== Life ==
Mutsu was born in November 1856, in Edo, the eldest daughter of samurai bannerman (hatamoto) Kaneda Shitomi and his concubine.

In the early Meiji era, she worked as a geisha at Kashiwaya in Shinbashi, Tokyo, and went by the name of Kosuzu. She was called one of the "two beauties of Shinbashi", along with Kosei, who was the lover of Count Itagaki Taisuke.

Although she lived in the geisha district (hanamachi), she had a reputation as a man-hater and a chaste woman. However, after Mutsu Munemitsu's first wife Renko died in February 1872, she married him in May of the same year, at the age of 17, becoming his second wife.

Munemitsu had two sons from his previous marriage, the first son Hirokichi and the second son Junkichi. In 1873, Ryōko and Munemitsu had their first daughter, Sayako. In 1877, Munemitsu's father Date Munehiro died.

After the Meiji Restoration (1868), Munemitsu was sentenced to five years in prison for his alleged role in the movement to overthrow the government, and was imprisoned in Yamagata Prison (later Miyagi Prison). Mutsu moved in with the Tsuda family, friends of Munemitsu, to serve her mother-in-law Masako, and supported Munemitsu in prison while raising her children. Munemitsu wrote many letters to her, and during his imprisonment in Miyagi Prison, he wrote a Chinese poem about their love for each other.

In 1882, Munemitsu was allowed to leave prison under a special pardon, and he went to Europe to study, advised by Itō Hirobumi. During his stay abroad, Munemitsu wrote more than 50 letters to Ryōko. In 1886, Munemitsu returned to Japan and entered government service. Ryōko joined the social circles and was called "the flower of Rokumeikan" together with Kyōko, the wife of Count Toda Ujitaka.

In 1888, she came to the United States with Munemitsu, who became the ambassador to the United States. With her beauty, personal charm, and eloquence, she was called "the flower of Washington society" and "the flower of the Japanese legation to the U.S.". In 1893, their daughter Sayako died, still in her early twenties.

After Munemitsu's death in 1897, she took in and raised Kaneda Fuyuko, a child born to Munemitsu and a Gion geisha.

Mutsu died on August 15, 1900, at the age of 45 due a to a metastasized tumor. After her death, Fuyuko was adopted by Mutsu's eldest son, Hirokichi, and joined the Mutsu family, where she died on May 22, 1904.

== In popular culture ==
=== Literature ===
- Futarō Yamada (1983). Edo no butōkai. Bungeishunjū.
- Futarō Yamada (1997). Yamada Futarō Meiji shōsetsu zenshū 8: Edo no butōkai. Chikuma Shobō. ISBN 4480033483.
- Kazuko Ōji (2006). 〜Sōshi munashiku: Mutsu Munemitsu no tsuma Ryōko〜. Shin-Jinbutsuōraisha. ISBN 4404034377.

=== Theater ===
- Tsumatachi no Rokumeikan (Meiji-za, etc.). Based on Edo no butōkai.

== See also ==
- Japanese Red Cross Society
- Mutsu Munemitsu
- Mutsu Hirokichi
