= Mutsu, Estonia =

Village in Estonia

Mutsu
- Location within Estonia
- Coordinates: 57°46′56″N 27°17′46″E
- Country: Estonia
- County: Võru County
- Municipality: Võru Parish

Population
  - Total: 9

Mutsu is a village in Estonia, in Võru Parish, which belongs to Võru County.
