= Mutsu Munemitsu =

Japanese politician

Senior Second Rank Count Mutsu Munemitsu
- 陸奥 宗光
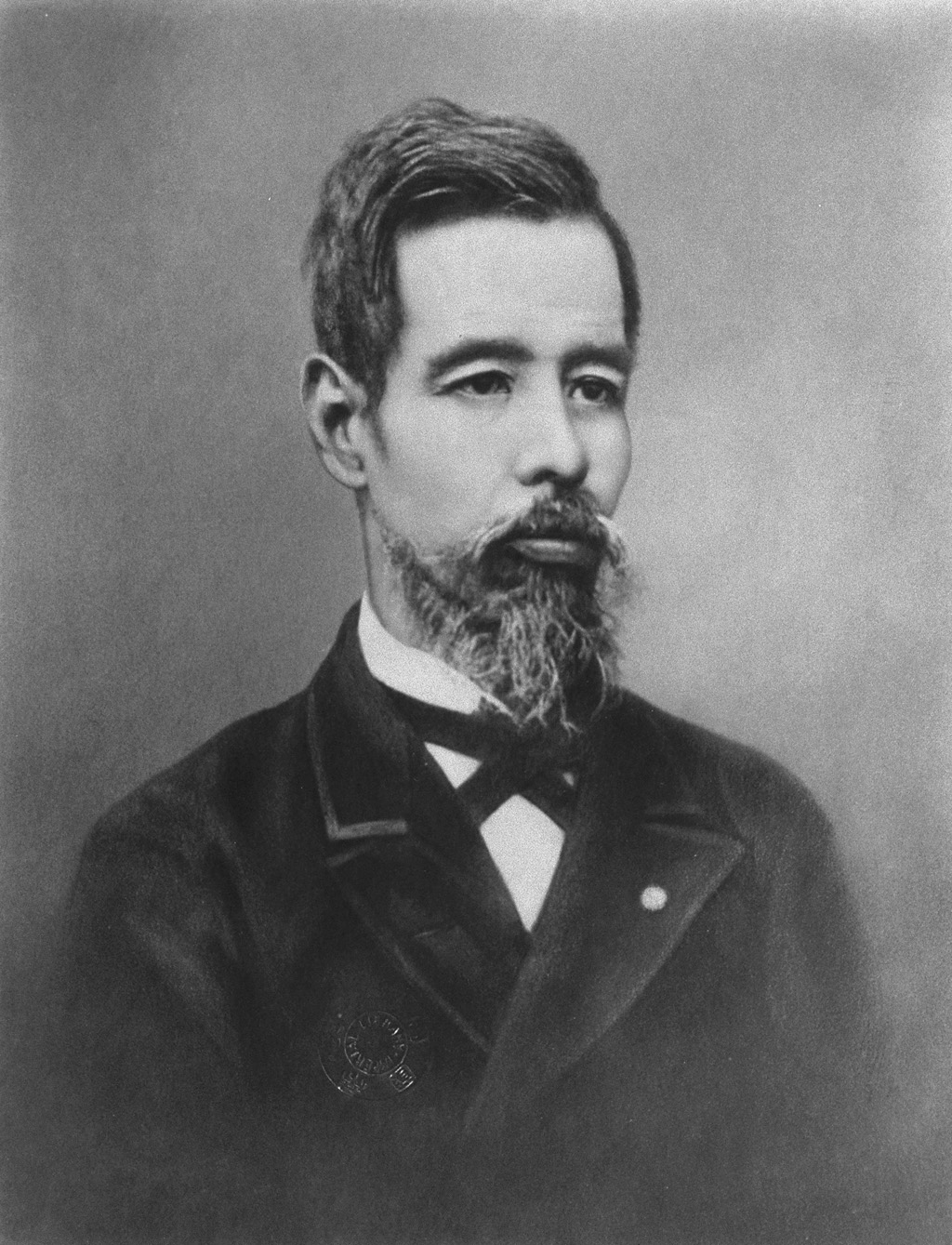

Minister for Foreign Affairs
- In office 8 August 1892 – 30 May 1896
- Prime Minister: Itō Hirobumi
- Preceded by: Enomoto Takeaki
- Succeeded by: Saionji Kinmochi

Minister of Agriculture and Commerce
- In office 17 May 1890 – 14 March 1892
- Prime Minister: Yamagata Aritomo; Matsukata Masayoshi
- Preceded by: Iwamura Michitoshi
- Succeeded by: Kōno Togama

Member of the House of Representatives
- In office 1 July 1890 – 25 December 1891
- Preceded by: Constituency established
- Succeeded by: Okazaki Kunisuke
- Constituency: Wakayama 1st

Member of the Genrōin
- In office 25 April 1875 – 28 November 1875

Governor of Kanagawa Prefecture
- In office 5 October 1871 – 17 August 1872
- Monarch: Meiji
- Preceded by: Terashima Munenori
- Succeeded by: Ōe Taku

Governor of Hyōgo Prefecture
- In office 28 July 1869 – 24 August 1869
- Monarch: Meiji
- Preceded by: Nakajima Masutane
- Succeeded by: Saisho Atsushi

Personal details
- Born: 20 August 1844 Wakayama, Kii, Japan
- Died: 24 August 1897 (aged 53) Takinogawa, Tokyo, Japan
- Spouse: Mutsu Ryōko
- Children: Mutsu Hirokichi
- Parent: Date Munehiro (father)
- Relatives: Okazaki Kunisuke (cousin)
- Education: Kobe Naval Training Center
- Occupation: Diplomat, Cabinet Minister
- Nickname: Mutsu Yonosuke

Count Mutsu Munemitsu (陸奥 宗光; August 20, 1844 – August 24, 1897) was a Japanese diplomat and politician. He became Minister of Foreign Affairs in 1890 and worked to revise unequal treaties. He served as plenipotentiary at the peace conference in Shimonoseki after the First Sino-Japanese War.

== Early life ==
Mutsu Munemitsu was born in Wakayama domain, Kii Province as the sixth son of Date Munehiro, a samurai retainer of the Kii Tokugawa Clan. His father was active in the Sonnō jōi movement, and Mutsu Munemitsu joined forces with Sakamoto Ryōma and Itō Hirobumi in the movement to overthrow the Tokugawa shogunate.

== Career ==
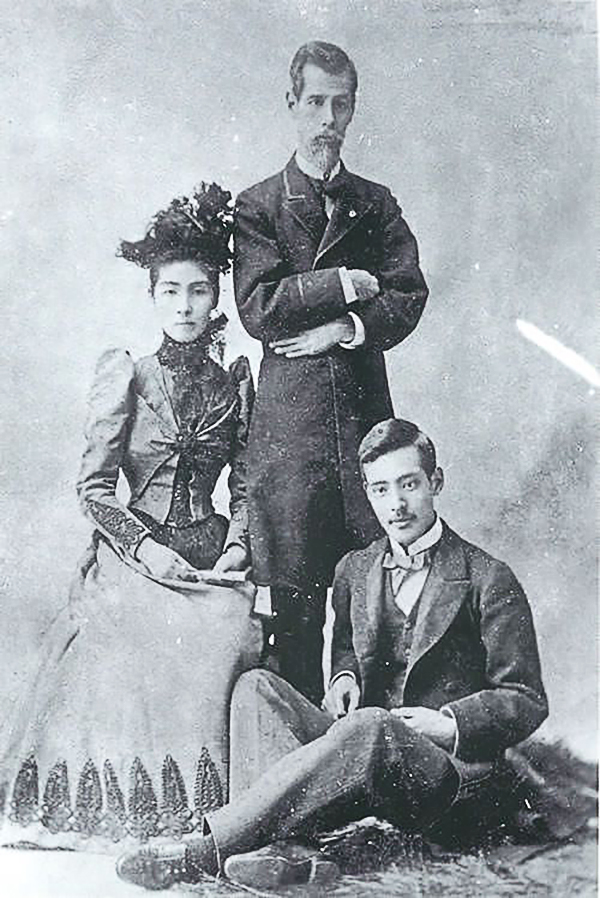
The Mutsu family

After the Meiji Restoration, Mutsu held a number of posts in the new Meiji government, including that of governor of Hyōgo Prefecture and later governor of Kanagawa Prefecture, both of which were host to foreign settlements. He was head of the Land Tax Reform of 1873–1881, and served on the Genrōin. He conspired to assist Saigō Takamori in the Satsuma Rebellion and was imprisoned from 1878 until 1883. While in prison he translated Jeremy Bentham's Utilitarianism into Japanese.

After he left prison, he rejoined the government as an official of the Foreign Ministry, and in 1884 was sent to Europe for studies. Later he became Japanese Minister to Washington D.C. (1888–1890), during which time he established formal diplomatic relations between Japan and Mexico, and partially revised the unequal treaties between Japan and the United States.

On his return to Japan in 1890, he became Minister of Agriculture and Commerce. He was also elected to the House of Representatives of Japan from the 1st Wakayama District for a single term in the 1890 General Election. In 1892, he became Foreign Minister in the Itō Hirobumi cabinet. In 1894, he concluded the Anglo-Japanese Treaty of Commerce and Navigation of 1894, which finally ended the unequal treaty status between Japan and Great Britain.

Mutsu was the lead Japanese negotiator in the Treaty of Shimonoseki, which ended the First Sino-Japanese War (1894–1895). In the wake of an attempt on the life of the Chinese leading negotiator Li Hongzhang by a Japanese fanatic, the Japanese government voluntarily reduced the size of the indemnity it planned to claim from China, and Mutsu famously remarked, 'Li's misfortune is the good fortune of the Great Ch'ing Empire'. The Triple Intervention by France, Germany and Russia reversed the gains that Mutsu had negotiated from China in the Treaty of Shimonoseki, and the Japanese public blamed Mutsu for the national humiliation. He resigned all government posts in May 1896 and moved to Ōiso, Kanagawa, where he wrote his personal diplomatic memoirs Kenkenroku (蹇々録) after the treaty was signed to explain his views and actions. However, his memoirs could not be published until 1923 due to the diplomatic secrets they contained.

Mutsu lived in what is now Kyu-Furukawa Gardens. Mutsu died of tuberculosis in Takinogawa, Tokyo Prefecture in 1897.

Mutsu was ennobled with the title of hakushaku (count) under the kazoku peerage system at the end of the Sino-Japanese War.

== Honors ==
- Grand Cordon of the Order of the Rising Sun (1895)
- Senior Second Rank (1897)

== Family tree ==
Count Mutsu Munemitsu	Countess Mutsu Ryōko
Countess Iso Mutsu	Count Mutsu Hirokichi
Ian Mutsu

== Notes ==
Political offices
Preceded by Enomoto Takeaki	Minister of Foreign Affairs; Aug 1892 – May 1896	Succeeded by Saionji Kinmochi
Preceded by Iwamura Michitoshi	Minister of Agriculture & Commerce; May 1890 – Mar 1892	Succeeded by Kōno Togama
