= Japanese Peruvians =

Ethnic group in Peru

Total population
- 22,534 by self-reported ancestry according to the Peruvian National Census (2017). 200,000 have been estimated by the Ministry of Foreign Affairs of Japan (2023)

Regions with significant populations
- Lima, Trujillo, Huancayo, Chiclayo

Languages
- Spanish • Japanese

Religion
- Predominantly Roman Catholicism, Buddhism, Shintoism

Related ethnic groups
- Chinese Peruvians, Japanese Americans, Japanese Canadians, Japanese Brazilians, Japanese Bolivians, Asian Latinos

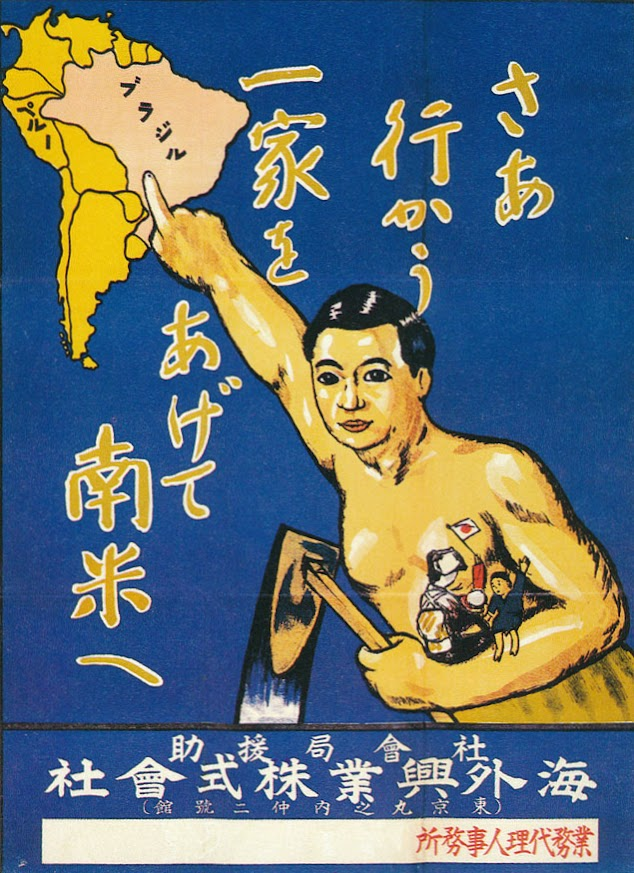
A poster used in Japan to attract immigrants to Peru and Brazil. It reads: "Join your Family, Let's Go to South America."

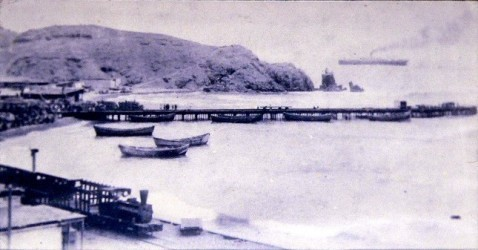
Arrival of the Sakura Maru to Peru with the first 790 new immigrants, 1899

Japanese Peruvians (Spanish: peruano-japonés or nipo-peruano; Japanese: 日系ペルー人, Nikkei Perūjin) are Peruvian citizens of Japanese origin or ancestry.

Peru has the second largest ethnic Japanese population in South America after Brazil. This community has had a significant cultural influence on the country, and as of the 2017 Census in Peru, 22,534 people or 0.2% of the Peruvian population self reported themselves as having Nikkei or Japanese ancestry, though the Japanese government estimates that at least 200,000 Peruvians have some degree of Japanese ancestry.

Peru was the first Latin American country to establish diplomatic relations with Japan, in June 1873. Peru was also the first Latin American country to accept Japanese immigration. The Sakura Maru carried Japanese families from Yokohama to Peru and arrived on April 3, 1899, at the Peruvian port city of Callao. This group of 790 Japanese became the first of several waves of emigrants who made new lives for themselves in Peru, some nine years before emigration to Brazil began.

Most immigrants arrived from Okinawa, Gifu, Hiroshima, Kanagawa and Osaka prefectures. Many arrived as farmers or to work in the fields but, after their contracts were completed, settled in the cities. In the period before World War II, the Japanese community in Peru was largely run by issei immigrants born in Japan. "Those of the second generation [the nisei] were almost inevitably excluded from community decision-making."

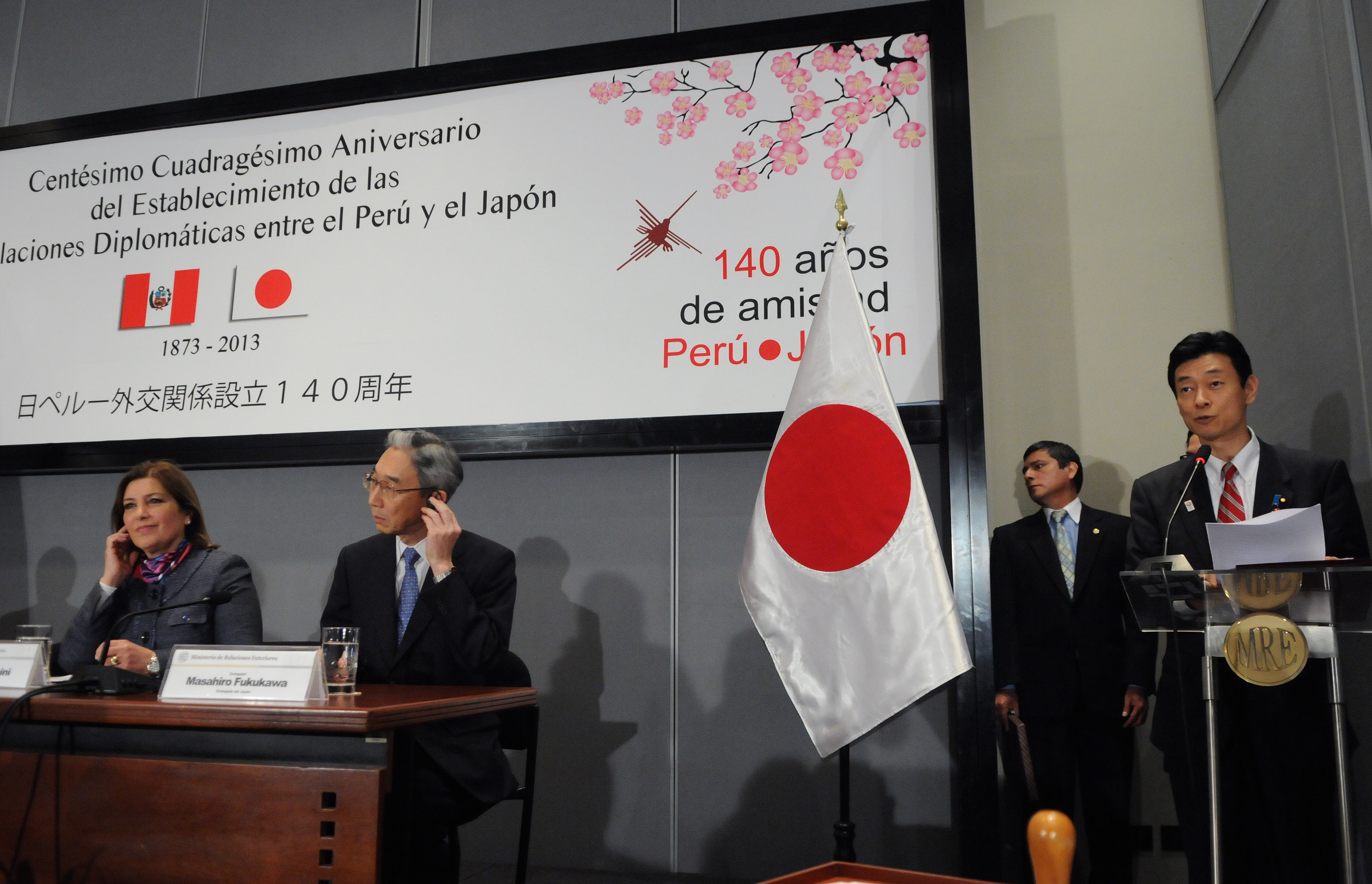
Peru and Japan celebrate the 140th anniversary of diplomatic ties (2013).

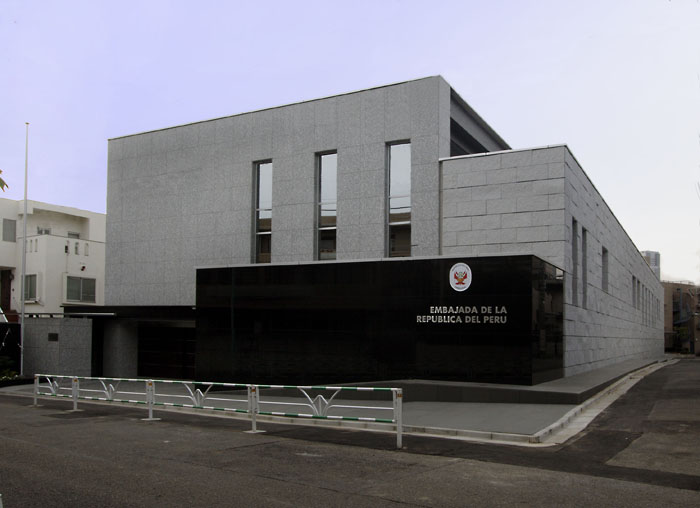
Embassy of Peru in Tokyo, Japan

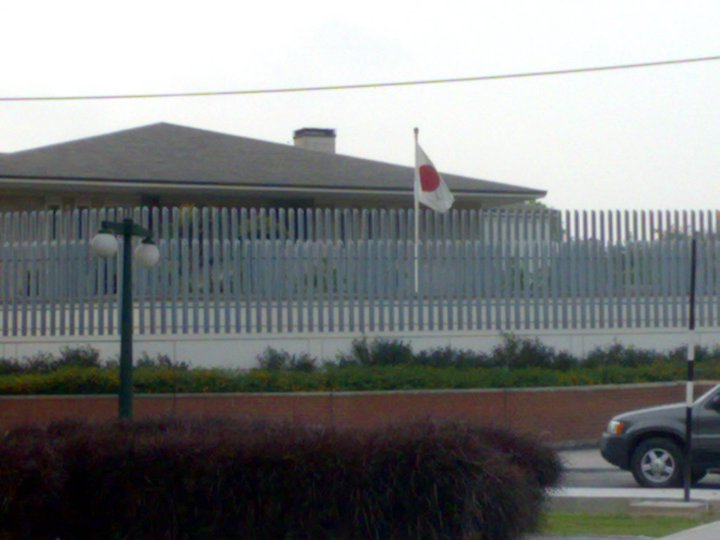
Embassy of Japan in Lima, Peru

== Japanese schools in Peru ==
Peru's current Japanese international school is Asociación Academia de Cultura Japonesa in Surco, Lima.

== World War II ==
Although there had been ongoing tensions between non-Japanese and Japanese Peruvians, the situation was drastically exacerbated by the war. Rising tensions ultimately led to a series of discriminatory laws being passed in 1936, the results of which included stigmatization of Japanese immigrants as "bestial", "untrustworthy", "militaristic", and "unfairly" competing with Peruvians for wages.

Fueled by legislative discrimination and media campaigns, a massive race riot (referred to as the "Saqueo") began on May 13, 1940, and lasted for three days. During the riots Japanese Peruvians were attacked and their homes and businesses destroyed. Despite its massive scale, the saqueo was underreported, a reflection of public sentiment towards the Japanese population at the time.

By 1941, there were around 26,000 immigrants of Japanese nationality in Peru. In December of that year, the Japanese Attack on Pearl Harbor would mark the beginning of the Pacific War campaign for the United States of America in World War II. After the Japanese air raids on Pearl Harbor and the Philippines, the U.S. Office of Strategic Services (OSS), formed during World War II to coordinate secret espionage activities against the Axis powers for the branches of the United States Armed Forces and the United States State Department, were alarmed at the large Japanese Peruvian community living in Peru and were also wary of the increasing new arrivals of Japanese nationals to Peru.

Fearing the Empire of Japan could sooner or later decide to invade the Republic of Peru and use the Southern American country as a landing base for its troops and its nationals living there as foreign agents against the US, in order to open another military front in the American Pacific, the U.S. government quickly negotiated a political–military alliance agreement with Lima in 1942. This alliance provided Peru with new military technology such as military aircraft, tanks, modern infantry equipment, and new boats for the Peruvian Navy, as well as new American bank loans and new investments in the Peruvian economy.

In return, the Americans ordered the Peruvians to track, identify and create ID files for all the Japanese Peruvians living in Peru. Later, at the end of 1942 and during all of 1943 and 1944, the Peruvian government on behalf of the U.S. Government and the OSS organized and started the massive arrests, without warrants and without judicial proceedings or hearings and the deportation of many of the Japanese Peruvian community to several American internment camps run by the U.S. Justice Department in the states of Nevada, New Mexico, Texas, Georgia and Virginia.

Racism and economic self-interest were major motivating factors in Peru's eager compliance with American deportation requests. As noted in a 1943 memorandum, Raymond Ickes of the Central and South American division of the Alien Enemy Control Unit had observed that many ethnic Japanese had been sent to the United States "... merely because the Peruvians wanted their businesses and not because there was any adverse evidence against them."

The enormous groups of Japanese Peruvian forced exiles were initially placed among the Japanese Americans who had been excluded from the US west coast; later they were interned in the Immigration and Naturalization Service (INS) facilities in Crystal City, Texas; Kenedy, Texas; and Santa Fe, New Mexico. The Japanese Peruvians were kept in these "alien detention camps" for more than two years before, through the efforts of civil rights attorney Wayne M. Collins, being offered "parole" relocation to the labor-starved farming community in Seabrook, New Jersey. The interned Japanese Peruvian nisei in the United States were further separated from the issei, in part because of distance between the internment camps and in part because the interned nisei knew almost nothing about their parents' homeland and language.

The deportation of Japanese Peruvians to the United States also involved expropriation without compensation of their property and other assets in Peru. At war's end, only 790 Japanese Peruvian citizens returned to Peru, and about 400 remained in the United States as "stateless" refugees. The interned Peruvian nisei who became naturalized American citizens would consider their children sansei, meaning three generations from the grandparents who had left Japan for Peru.

== Dekasegi Japanese Peruvians ==
In 1998, with new strict laws from the Japanese immigration, many fake-nikkei were deported or went back to Peru. The requirements to bring Japanese descendants were more strict, including documents as "zairyūshikaku-ninteishōmeisho" or Certificate of Eligibility for Resident, which probes the Japanese bloodline of the applicant.

With the onset of the global recession in 2008, among the expatriate communities in Japan, Peruvians accounted for the smallest share of those who returned to their homelands. People returning from Japan also made up the smallest share of those applying for assistance under the new law. As of the end of November 2013, only three Peruvians who had returned from Japan had received reintegration assistance. The law provides some attractive benefits, but most Peruvians (as of 2015, there were 60,000 Peruvians in Japan) were not interested in returning to Peru.

Peruvians in Japan came together to offer support for Japanese victims of the devastating March 2011 earthquake and tsunami. In the wake of the disaster, the town of Minamisanriku in Miyagi Prefecture lost all but two of its fishing vessels. Peruvians raised money to buy the town new boats as a service to Japan and to express their gratitude for the hospitality received in Japan.

== The Japanese press in Peru ==
In June 1921, Nippi Shimpo (Japanese Peruvian News) was published.

== Cuisine ==
The cuisine of Peru is a heterogeneous mixture of the diverse cultural influences that enriched the South American country. Nikkei cuisine, which fuses Japanese cuisine with other regional traditions, has become a gastronomic sensation in many countries. Peru, alongside Brazil, is particularly known for Nikkei cuisine.

The origins of Nikkei cuisine relied on the wide variety of fresh ingredients in Peru, the prosperous fishing industry of Peru, the Japanese know-how using fresh seafood, and adopting ceviche, which is the Peruvian flag dish, and Chifa dishes as well (fusion cuisine that came from the Chinese community in Peru). Japanese fusion dishes like Acevichado maki sushi rolls were created by incorporating the recipes and flavors from the indigenous Peruvians. Some examples of chefs who use Nikkei cuisine include Nobu Matsuhisa, Ferran Adrià and Kurt Zdesar.

== Notable people ==
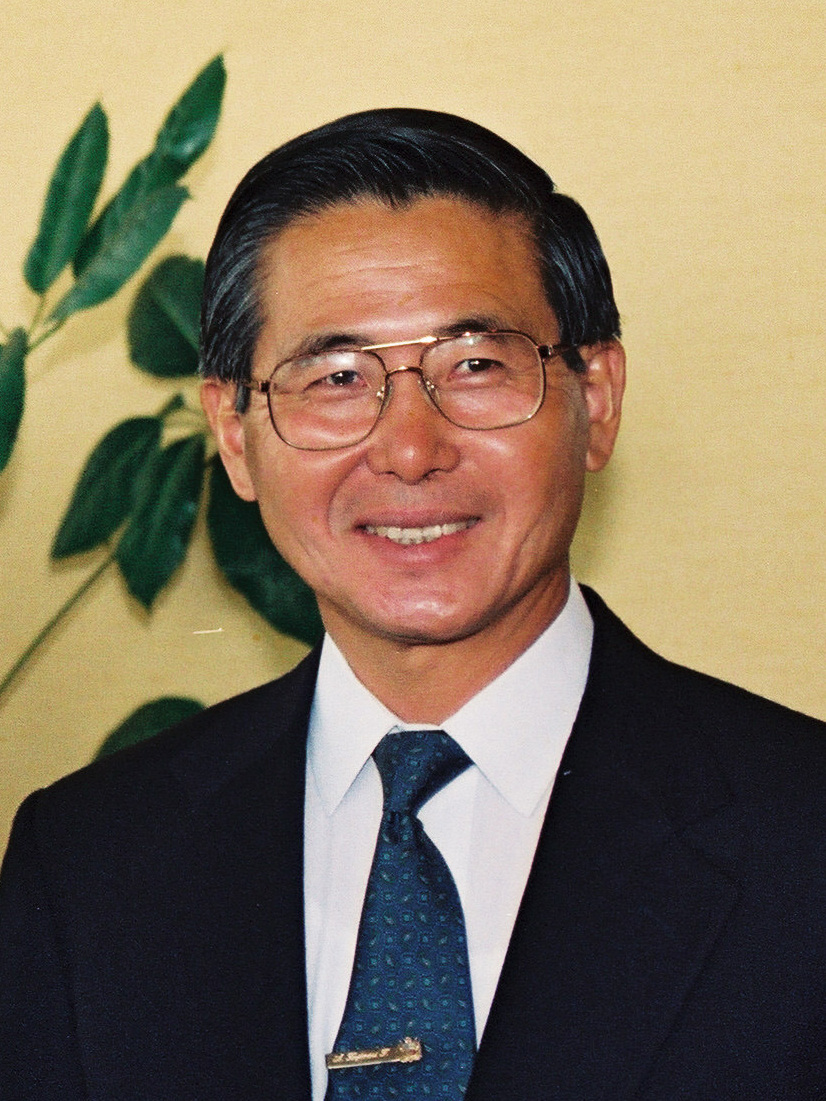
Alberto Fujimori (left) was the first president of Peru of Japanese descent from 1990 to 2000. His daughter, Keiko Fujimori (right), has served as president since 2026.
- Anthony Aoki: Peruvian footballer and midfielder
- Koichi Aparicio: Peruvian footballer
- Ernesto Arakaki: International footballer
- Hideyoshi Arakaki: Peruvian footballer
- Alberto Fujimori: Former President of Peru
- Keiko Fujimori: President, Former First Lady, Congresswoman and businesswoman (daughter of Alberto Fujimori)
- Kenji Fujimori: Former congressman (son of Alberto Fujimori)
- Santiago Fujimori: Lawyer (younger brother of Alberto Fujimori)
- Susana Higuchi: Politician, former First Lady, ex-spouse of Alberto Fujimori
- Jorge Hirano: International footballer
- Fernando Iwasaki: Writer
- José Pereda Maruyama: Retired international footballer, having notably played for Argentinian powerhouse Boca Juniors
- Aldo Miyashiro: Writer, TV host and celebrity
- Augusto Miyashiro: Former Mayor of the City of Chorrillos, an important middle-class southern suburban district of Metropolitan Lima
- Kaoru Morioka: Japanese futsal player
- Kazuyoshi Shimabuku: Japanese football player
- Venancio Shinki: Artist
- Tony Succar: percussionist and music producer
- Akio Tamashiro: Karate athlete. Pan American Gold medalist. Head of the Peruvian Karate Federation
- Eduardo Tokeshi: Plastic artist
- Víctor García Toma: Former Minister of Justice
- Tilsa Tsuchiya: Artist
- José Watanabe: Poet
- Arturo Yamasaki: Football referee, famous for officiating the Match of the Century in the 1970 FIFA World Cup
- Rafael Yamashiro: Peruvian Congressman and politician
- David Soria Yoshinari: International footballer
- Jaime Yoshiyama: Former Prime Minister, former Cabinet Minister, former vice president and former President of the Peruvian Congress
- Carlos Yushimito (Yoshimitsu): Writer and analyst

== See also ==
- Asian Latin Americans
- Chinese Peruvians
- Japan–Peru relations
- Hirohito Ōta
