= Hidetaka Ogura =

Japanese sociologist, educator and political advisor (1951–2023)

- 小倉 英敬

Personal details
- Born: 1951 Japan
- Died: September 5, 2023 (aged 71–72) Shizuoka, Japan
- Citizenship: Japanese
- Education: Aoyama Gakuin University
- Occupation: Educator, diplomat

Hidetaka Ogura (Japanese: 小倉 英敬, Hepburn: Ogura Hidetaka; 1951 — September 5, 2023) was a Japanese sociologist, educator and political advisor. As an advisor, he worked as at Japan's embassies in Havana, Lima, and Mexico City, after which he worked as a university professor at a number of universities in Tokyo and Osaka. He died of cancer in Shizuoka at the age of 72.

From 1996 to 1997, he was one of several hostages held at the Japanese ambassador's residence in Peru, a period of captivity that concluded with a military raid on April 22, 1997. Following this event, Ogura formally denounced the Chavín de Huántar Command, accusing them of the extrajudicial executions of three militants during the rescue operation.

== Biography ==
Ogura was born in Japan in 1951. He lived in Peru in the late 1970s, where he studied the works of José Carlos Mariátegui at the National University of San Marcos, also carrying out investigation works at the Centro Rural Andino Bartolomé de las Casas. He worked at Japan's embassy in Havana, where he met Fidel Castro and the Che Guevara. He started working at Japan's embassy in Lima as an employee, eventually being promoted to advisor.

In 1996, Ogura was one several people taken hostage by the Túpac Amaru Revolutionary Movement (MRTA) who, headed by Néstor Cerpa Cartolini, took over the ambassador's residence over a nearly five-month long period. According to other former hostages, Ogura met the militants daily, with whom he would have friendly talks about politics, also having lunch and coffee with them. After an escape plan was discovered by the terrorists, other hostages suspected Ogura of having leaked the plan to Cerpa, head of the militant group.

On April 22, 1997, prior to Operation Chavín de Huántar (the raid that put an end to the hostage situation), Ogura was playing a card game with MRTA members, after which they went to the first floor to play futsal. Ogura was forcibly taken to a room by the rest of the hostages, and a signal was given to execute the raid. Following his liberation, Ogura expressed disdain at the rescue operation, stating that he wished that a negotiated solution would've taken place instead. After leaving Lima, Ogura worked as a political advisor at Japan's embassy in Mexico City. He quit in 1998 to work as a college professor. He would go on to work at Tokyo's Kanagawa University, International Christian University and J. F. Oberlin University, as well as Osaka's Tokiwakai Gakuen University.

In 2000, Ogura spoke to Peruvian newspaper El Comercio, claiming that three MRTA members—Eduardo Nicolás Cruz Sánchez (Tito), Herma Luz Meléndez Cueva (Cynthia), and Víctor Salomón Peceros Pedraza—were captured and executed, which contradicted the government's official story. The claim was repeated in 2001 and, despite the denial of Ogura's statement by other hostages named by him as witnesses to the events, an investigation was officially launched into his claims. APRODEH, a human rights NGO, supported the families of the deceased MRTA members. Following the accusation, critics of Ogura connected him to the Japanese government's suspicion that someone had assisted the MRTA by giving the group insider information on the embassy, although nothing was ultimately proven. The Peruvian government denied the claims.

Ogura died of colorectal cancer on September 5, 2023. He was married with two children.

== See also ==
- Truth and Reconciliation Commission (Peru)
- Morihisa Aoki
