= Chavín De Huántar: The Rescue of the Century =

- Theatrical release poster
- Directed by: Diego de León
- Written by: Diego de León
- Produced by: Carlos Linares; Jorge Olivas
- Starring: Rodrigo Sánchez Patiño
- Cinematography: Miguel Valencia
- Edited by: Roberto Benavides; Diego de León
- Music by: Elton Pacho
- Production companies: Colibri Producciones; Ningún Creativo
- Distributed by: BF Distribución
- Release date: October 30, 2025
- Running time: 96 minutes
- Country: Peru
- Languages: Spanish; Quechua

Chavín De Huántar: The Rescue of the Century (Spanish: Chavín de Huántar: el rescate del siglo) is a 2025 Peruvian historical action thriller film written, co-edited and directed by Diego de León in his directorial debut. It is inspired by Operation Chavín de Huántar, considered the most successful hostage rescue operation in history, starring Rodrigo Sánchez Patiño as Colonel Juan Valer Sandoval, leader of the operation.

== Synopsis ==
In 1996–1997, the takeover of the Japanese embassy in Lima by the Túpac Amaru Revolutionary Movement triggered a 126-day crisis. During this siege, dozens of soldiers faced a challenge that tested their courage and humanity.

== Cast ==
- Rodrigo Sánchez Patiño as Colonel Juan "Chizito" Valer Sandoval
- André Silva as Mayor Rivera
- Miguel Iza as Néstor Cerpa Cartolini
- Connie Chaparro as Marina
- Sergio Galliani as Colonel José Williams
- Alfonso Dibós as Chancellor Francisco Tudela
- Martín Martínez as Ricardo Rivas
- Cristhian Esquivel as Colonel Ortiz
- Baldomero Cáceres as Giusti
- Carlos Thornton as Admiral Rinaldi
- Nicolás Fantinato as Ambassador of Bolivia
- Aníbal Lozano Herrera as Tito
- Víctor Acurio
- Sandro Calderón
- Zoe Fernández

== Production ==
The film's production lasted seven years; and its filming, carried out in the replica built as a training center for the original commandos and at the Chorrillos Military School, concluded after several weeks in November 2024.

== Marketing ==
The first teaser trailer for the film was released on April 21, 2025. The trailer, released on YouTube on July 28 of that same year, accumulated more than 1.8 million views in less than 1 week and surpassed 3.7 million views by the end of August, becoming the most viewed trailer of a Peruvian feature film.

== Release ==
The film premiered on October 30, 2025, in Peruvian theaters.

== Box office ==
On its opening day, the film attracted 37,000 viewers. Over its opening weekend, the film was seen by more than 200,000 viewers. On its tenth day in theaters, the film reached half a million viewers. A week later, the film surpassed 1 million viewers. By December 2025, it had attracted a total of 1.5 million viewers, becoming the highest-grossing Peruvian film of the year, surpassing Single, Married, Widowed, Divorced 2, as well as the fifth highest-grossing Peruvian film of all time, surpassing Locos de amor (2016).
