= Carlos Giusti =

Peruvian judge (1944–1997)

President of the Supreme Court of Lima
- In office 1988–1988
- President: Alan García
- Preceded by: Jorge Morales Arnao
- Succeeded by: Manuel E. Marull Gálvez

Personal details
- Born: January 28, 1944 Lima, Peru
- Died: April 22, 1997 (aged 53) Lima, Peru
- Cause of death: Gunshot wound
- Resting place: Jardines de la Paz
- Spouse: Iris Pareja (m. 1969)
- Children: 3
- Education: National University of San Marcos

Carlos Ernesto Giusti Acuña (January 28, 1944 — April 22, 1997) was a Peruvian magistrate who served as president of the Supreme Court of Lima in 1988, and as a justice of the Supreme Court of Peru. He was the only hostage to be killed during Operation Chavín de Huántar, which put an end to the Japanese embassy hostage crisis.

== Biography ==
Giusti was born in Lima on January 28, 1944. He studied at the Faculty of Law and Political Science of the Pontifical Catholic University of Peru, later transferring to the National University of San Marcos. He married Iris Pareja (died 2010), with whom he had three children.

He began his professional career as a legal advisor for a number of banks in the country. In 1976, he worked as a substitute judge in one of Lima's courts and, in 1977, he worked as an ad hoc judge for the income fraud case of the Seguro Social del Empleado and became a titular judge of the First Civil Court of Callao. In 1981, he was assigned to the Internal Control Body of the country's Judiciary and, in 1982, he was appointed a Full Member of the Superior Court of Justice of Lima, serving in the Second and Fourth Civil Chambers, and in the Second, Third and Sixth Correctional Courts. In 1984 and 1985, he was chosen as president of the National Magistrates Association, also being assigned as secretary of the Latin American Federation of Magistrates (FLAM) and forming part of the commission of the American Jurist Association.

Giusti was one of the attendees at a party held in honour of Emperor Akihito on December 17, 1996, at the Japanese ambassador's residence in San Isidro District, Lima. At 8:20 pm PET, 14 members of the Túpac Amaru Revolutionary Movement (MRTA) took over the residence, gradually reducing the number of hostages to a final 72 over the following months. Giusti turned 56 in 1997, with his family sending him a Mariachi singer who sang Las Mañanitas outside of the residence. Two MRTA members, Néstor Cerpa Cartolini and Roli Rojas, greeted him and conversed about the three's shared support of the Club Universitario de Deportes.

On April 22, 1997, a military operation to release the hostages began at 3:23 pm, carried out by the Chavín de Huántar Command. Giusti was located on "Room H," located at the house's second floor, hiding in a wardrobe once the explosions began. being shot in the femoral vein during the events by one of the rebels, who was wielding an AKM. Raúl Jiménez Chávez, a member of the command, was positioned at the room's entrance, being fatally shot. He went into cardiac arrest, being immediately treated and evacuated alongside lieutenant Raúl Jiménez by doctor Juan Chuquichaico. He was taken to the Central Military Hospital, but did not survive.

Giusti was buried at Jardines de la Paz, a cemetery in La Molina District. Although initial reports claimed that Giusti and Jiménez were the victims of friendly fire, these claims were later discredited. He was declared a "civil martyr and hero of democracy and justice" through Law No. 26779 on July 26, 2011, under the second presidency of Alan García.

== See also ==
- Juan Valer
