= Lori Berenson =

American political activist and former prisoner (born 1969)

- Born: November 13, 1969 (age 56); New York City, U.S.
- Occupations: Interpreter, secretary
- Spouse: Aníbal Augusto Apari Sánchez (divorced)
- Parent(s): Rhoda Kobeloff Berenson and Mark Berenson
- Criminal charge: Collaboration with a terrorist organization
- Penalty: 20 years imprisonment

Lori Helene Berenson (born November 13, 1969) is an American who served a 20-year prison sentence for collaboration with a guerrilla organization in Peru in 1996. Berenson was convicted of collaborating with the Túpac Amaru Revolutionary Movement (MRTA), a group which advocated the overthrow of the Peruvian government by force and was considered to be a terrorist organization by the Peruvian government, and which was also on the U.S. State Department's official "terrorist organization" list from 1997–2001. Her arrest and conviction, and the circumstances surrounding her trials, drew considerable attention in both the United States and Peru.

== Early life and education ==
Berenson was born and raised in New York City to Rhoda and Mark Berenson, both college professors. Her family moved into a three-bedroom duplex apartment at East Midtown Plaza in the early 1970s. After graduating from LaGuardia High School of Music and Art, she enrolled at Massachusetts Institute of Technology (MIT) in Cambridge, Massachusetts, in the fall of 1987. On her web site, she states that she volunteered for soup kitchens and blood banks and also worked as a mother's helper in the Hamptons as a teenager. While an undergraduate at MIT, she volunteered with the Committee in Solidarity with the People of El Salvador (CISPES). She dropped out of MIT in 1988 as a sophomore majoring in archeology and anthropology and continued to volunteer for CISPES. Later, she went to El Salvador and became secretary and interpreter for Leonel González, a leader of the Farabundo Martí National Liberation Front (FMLN), during negotiations that achieved peace in 1992. FMLN was at that time an umbrella organization associated with various leftist guerrilla organizations and the Salvadoran Communist Party and working to overthrow the Salvadoran military dictatorship. FMLN transitioned during the peace process in order to become a legal political party. González (aka Salvador Sánchez Cerén) would become the President of El Salvador in 2014.

== Activities in Peru and arrest ==
In Peru, Berenson met members of the Túpac Amaru Revolutionary Movement (MRTA), a group that committed attacks in Peru including kidnapping, bank robberies, extortion, hostage taking, and bombings. During these attacks some 400 people died in attacks planned by the MRTA. Berenson initially denied knowing that they were MRTA members. After acknowledging that her associates were members she maintained that she did not know the group was planning to conduct an attack on Peru’s Congress or planning any other act of violence.

Berenson obtained press credentials for herself and her photographer to the Congress of Peru to interview some of its members and attend sessions where she took notes and sketched a seating plan. Afterwards, the media reported these to be "false journalist credentials". Berenson and those who supported her contended that she was on assignment from two U.S. publications, Modern Times and Third World Viewpoint, to work as a freelance journalist writing articles about the effects of poverty on women in Perú. Her photographer, Nancy Gilvonio, was actually the wife of Néstor Cerpa, the MRTA second-in-command — although Berenson maintained she was unaware of this connection, saying that she knew her only as a Bolivian photographer. Berenson had entered the main Congress building with Gilvonio several times during 1995 to interview members of Congress. Gilvonio was alleged to have provided the information she collected to the MRTA including detailed information on the floor plans of Congress, its security and members. The alleged plan was for the MRTA to invade the Congress building, kidnap the legislators, and exchange the hostages for MRTA prisoners.

On November 30, 1995, Berenson and Gilvonio were arrested on a public bus in downtown Lima. Berenson was accused of being a leader of the MRTA, which had been officially classified as a terrorist group by the government. Berenson was further accused of aiding the MRTA with her house being used as a meeting house and arms depot, and of using her connections to facilitate arms purchases, she was also implicated in participating in the planned attack on the Peruvian congress.

Within hours after Berenson's arrest, the government launched an all-night siege of the MRTA safe house in an upscale neighborhood in Lima which Berenson had co-rented with an associate. At the end of the siege, three MRTA guerrillas and one police officer had died and 14 guerrillas were captured. The upper floors of the house were found to contain an "arsenal of weapons" and ammunition including 3,000 sticks of dynamite.

Diagrams, notes, weapons, and police and military uniforms found at the safe house suggested that the group was planning to seize members of Congress and trade them for captured guerrillas. Police also seized a floor plan and a scale architectural model of the Congress building.

Berenson said that she was unaware of what was happening on the upper floors and had even moved out some months prior to her arrest. She denied knowing of the presence of either the weaponry or the guerrillas, and she also denied knowing that the documents she prepared would be used for terrorism. She later admitted that she had learned that her associates were MRTA members and she said: "It might not have been intentional, but the bottom line is: I did collaborate with them." In the same interview she maintained that she had not been aware that weapons were being amassed in the upper floors of her house which she had sublet to the MRTA members, and she also maintained that she was unaware that violent actions were being planned at the Congress, stating that "at that time in Fujimori's dictatorship, Congress was the only place that there was some sort of democratic process."

On January 8, 1996, the DINCOTE (División Nacional Contra el Terrorismo, or National Counterterrorism Division) hosted a news event in which they showed Berenson to the press. At the event, she shouted in Spanish, with her fists clenched to her sides, in a statement to the local reporters:

I am to be condemned for my concern about the conditions of hunger and misery which exists in this country. Here nobody can deny that in Perú there is much injustice. There is an institutionalized violence that has killed the people's finest sons and has condemned children to die of hunger. If it is a crime to worry about the subhuman conditions in which the majority of this population lives, then I will accept my punishment. But this is not a love of violence! This is not to be a criminal terrorist because in the MRTA there are no criminal terrorists! It is a revolutionary movement! I love this nation. I love this nation and although this love is going to make (cost) me years in prison, I will never stop loving, and never will lose the hope and confidence that there will be a new day of justice in Perú!

The image of Berenson defiantly shouting to the press continues to make her unpopular in Peru. Her supporters later offered the explanation that her vehement defense of MRTA came about because she was angry over the treatment of a wounded cell mate and that she was instructed by authorities to shout in order to be heard.

== Trials ==
After she was tried in 1996 and sentenced to life imprisonment, Berenson became, as The Guardian put it, a "cause celèbre for human rights campaigners and a symbol for leftwing social activists around the world", except in Peru, where parties and newspapers across the political spectrum condemned her actions, and criticized the unwillingness of European and American media, even progressive ones, to apply the label "terrorist" to citizens of "First World" countries.

Elements of her trial were criticized in statements from institutions ranging from the US State Department to Amnesty International to be violations of human rights and lacking in impartiality, provoking controversy in the United States and other countries. In particular, she was allegedly denied the right to examine the government's evidence and witnesses.

In accordance with anti-terrorism legislation enacted during a state of emergency declared by the authoritarian government of President Alberto Fujimori, Berenson was tried in a closed courtroom by a military tribunal on a charge of treason against the fatherland for leadership of a terrorist organization. This charge did not require Peruvian citizenship as an element.

The proceedings were conducted by a hooded military judge who spoke through a voice distortion apparatus (judges often concealed their identities to protect themselves from assassination). On January 11, 1996, six weeks after her arrest and three days after her presentation to the media, Berenson was convicted of all charges and sentenced to life in prison without parole. An appeal lodged against the conviction was dismissed on January 30. Due to the nature of the closed military court, human rights campaigners protested her conviction and disputed the fairness of the proceedings.

In February 1999, after three years of fact-finding, the U.N. Working Group on Arbitrary Detention found that Ms. Berenson had been arbitrarily deprived of her liberty in violation of various articles of the Universal Declaration of Human Rights, of which Peru is a signatory. According to the Carter Center among the violations of international legal standards and due process, "Ms. Berenson's trial was in a secret military court, where her lawyer was not allowed to cross-examine witnesses or challenge evidence," and former president Carter stated directly that he was "deeply concerned that Lori Berenson has not been afforded her rights of due process by law."

In 2000, following a change of government in Peru and after years of political pressure from the United States and the human rights community, Peru's Supreme Military Council overturned Berenson's treason conviction and life sentence and remanded her case to the civilian court for retrial. On June 20, 2001, a three-judge panel convicted Berenson of collaboration with terrorists, but ruled she was not a terrorist. She was sentenced to 20 years, with consideration given for time already served under her prior conviction.

In 2002, the Inter-American Commission on Human Rights of the Organization of American States condemned the system under which Berenson was tried. Alleging violations of the American Convention on Human Rights, to which Peru is a party, Berenson's case was referred to the Inter-American Court of Human Rights of the Organization of American States when the government of Peru refused to accept the Commission's recommendations.

On November 25, 2004, the Inter-American Court upheld the conviction and sentence. The Court did condemn the judicial system under which Berenson was originally tried, and also condemned Berenson's earlier incarceration at Yanamayo Prison. Peruvian President Alejandro Toledo hailed the verdict, and The New York Times noted that few Peruvians have any sympathy for Berenson.

== Efforts to free Berenson and interest in Peru ==
Over the years, there were several efforts made on behalf of Berenson, stemming from concerns she did not obtain a fair trial or was not receiving humanitarian treatment, or simply to obtain her release. Various endeavors came from Presidents Jimmy Carter, Bill Clinton, and George W. Bush.

In December 1996, the MRTA seized the Japanese Ambassador's residence in Lima and demanded that MRTA prisoners be released in exchange for the release of their hostages. MRTA leader Nestor Cerpa, Nancy Gilvonio's husband, led the takeover of the Embassy. Berenson was third on a list of MRTA prisoners whose release was sought by the hostage-takers. After 126 days, the standoff ended in a raid by Peruvian special forces in which all hostage-takers were killed. Two military personnel, commander EP Juan Valer Sandoval and captain EP Raúl Jiménez Chávez, and one of the seventy-two hostages, Carlos Giusti, were also killed.

On July 21, 1999, the United States House of Representatives voted against an amendment sponsored by US Rep. Maxine Waters described as "to express the sense of Congress concerning support for democracy in Peru and the release of Lori Berenson". The vote failed 189 to 234.

Her arrest led to press interest with some in the U.S. Congress embracing Berenson's description of the MRTA as "revolutionary," not "terrorist." Berenson argued that "the whole social stigma around the word 'terrorism' has to be changed".

In January 2002 Thomas Gumbleton, Bishop of Archdiocese of Detroit and founder of Pax Christi USA, visited with Berenson to work with Peruvian government officials "for her release."

Columns were written for American newspapers, such as The Washington Post and The New York Times, calling on the US to pressure Peru to free Berenson. Other writers, however, took the contrary position, including the Wall Street Journal online edition.

== Imprisonment ==
Berenson spent her early years in prison at facilities high in the Andes, the first of which the Inter-American Court ruled is operated inhumanely. The Yanamayo prison where Berenson was initially held for about three years lies at about 3,800 metres (12,500 ft) above sea level near Lake Titicaca in the Puno Region, in southern Peru.

On October 7, 1998, Berenson was moved to another prison in Socabaya. She remained there until August 31, 2000, when she was transferred to the women's prison of Chorrillos in Lima. Then, on December 21, 2001, she was relocated to the maximum-security Huacariz Penitentiary in Cajamarca, 560 kilometres (350 mi) north of Lima.

In February 2002, Berenson took part in a 25-day hunger strike of "political prisoners" in an attempt to influence the government of Peru to improve prison conditions and revise its anti-terrorism laws. The strike ended without reaching its goals, though less than a year later, Peru revised many of those laws.

In October 2003, Berenson married Aníbal Apari Sánchez, 40, whom she had met in 1997 when they were both incarcerated at Yanamayo prison. Apari Sánchez was convicted of being a member of the MRTA. When he was released in 2003 on conditional liberty (parole) in Lima, his travel was restricted, and he was accordingly not present at the wedding in Cajamarca and had to be represented by his father. Later he was allowed conjugal visits. Apari Sánchez is now a practicing attorney in Lima and directs a non-governmental organization (NGO) that assists individuals formerly imprisoned on charges of assisting or being members of the MRTA in their rehabilitation into society. He is also co-founder of a political party, Patria Libre, that participated in the 2011 national elections.

From 2003 through 2008 Berenson worked in and co-managed the bakery at Huacariz Prison which served the inmate population and the Cajamarca community.

Periodically, through her freelori.org web page entitled "Lori's Words", Berenson issued advice to youth as well as criticism of the policies of the World Bank and the International Monetary Fund, the war in Iraq, the "American Way of Life", the Peruvian "political class", and allegations of maltreatment and torture of prisoners. Berenson's commentaries on capitalism, globalism, and the environmental impact of mining companies have also appeared on the Internet.

On September 16, 2008, her father announced that she was pregnant with her first child. In January 2009, Berenson was transferred to a prison in Lima owing to a serious back problem which complicated her pregnancy. In May 2009, she gave birth to a boy, whom she named Salvador, and who lived with her while she was in prison. In Peru, children are allowed to remain with their incarcerated mothers until age 3.

== Release ==
Peru's Justice Minister Victor García Toma on May 3, 2010, stated that "I don't think Lori Berenson can create harm for society, but she has created anger among citizens", and recommended that the remaining five years of her sentence be commuted and that she be expelled from Peru to the U.S., indicating that his recommendation was based on a legal and political analysis of the circumstances.

On May 25, 2010, after serving 15 years, Berenson was granted a conditional release, with the judge stating that she would have to remain in Peru on parole for the remaining five years of her sentence, but would be freed from prison.

Berenson's attorneys submitted documents to the court indicating that she "recognized she committed errors" by associating herself with the MRTA. She was freed two days later, a release which attracted a media circus. She was driven to an apartment in the upscale Miraflores area of Lima, where her new neighbors welcomed her by shouting "terrorist" at her. Berenson's parents indicated that she would separate from Apari and raise her son, Salvador, as a single mother. Peru's Minister of Justice, García Toma, stated that the Cabinet might commute Berenson's sentence and expel her from the country.

With protesters gathering daily outside her Lima apartment building, lighting candles and demanding that she be either deported from Peru or reimprisoned, Berenson sent a letter to President Alan García acknowledging her "criminal responsibility for terrorist collaboration", and further writing, "I would also like to say that I very much regret the harm I have caused Peruvian society, and I ask forgiveness from people who have been affected by my actions or words." She then requested that her sentence be commuted so she could return to the United States.

On June 8, 2010, former U.S. president Bill Clinton, speaking while on a visit to Peru, expressed his support for Berenson's release. Peru's state attorney for counterterrorism, Julio Galindo, appealed Berenson's parole, depicting her as a calculating, unrepentant extremist who posed a continuing threat to the Peruvian public. On August 16, 2010, Berenson appeared before the appeals court to request she be allowed to remain free on parole. In responding to Galindo's allegations, she stated that she was not a threat to society:

I was sentenced for the crime of collaboration with terrorism, and I did collaborate with the MRTA. I have never been a leader, nor a militant. I have never participated in acts of violence nor of bloodshed, nor have I killed anyone. And what I would like to clarify here is that I know that my mere participation, even though it was secondary in one incident, if it contributed to the violence in society, I am deeply sorry and I regret it ... I was in prison for almost 15 years. I have reflected a great deal over it, and I understand that violence did harm to society; I understand it and I regret that I participated in it. I believe that things, a better society, are achieved by building and not by destroying ... Also, I have a different vision of life. It has been almost 15 years. I am now a 40-year-old woman. I left home when I was young. But I have a family who have sacrificed everything for me, and I would like to pay them back somehow. And more than that, I have a child, a 15-month-old son and he is a child I would like to be close to, like any mother. I would like to bring up my son to be a good man. That is now my objective.

On August 18, 2010, the appeals court annulled Berenson's parole and returned her to prison while technical aspects of the parole were considered. On November 5, a Peruvian judge ordered that she be released from prison. On November 8, she was again released on parole, still required to remain in Peru until her sentence ended. In January 2011, an appeals court rejected a prosecutor's attempt to revoke her parole. Berenson and her attorney told reporters that the ruling was final and could not be appealed by prosecutors, ending eight months of legal uncertainty.

Constitutional law expert Mario Amoretti, while agreeing that the ruling should be final, remarked that the state conceivably could file a challenge, claiming some constitutional violation, but he said he did not see grounds for such an appeal. Berenson was required to remain in Peru on supervised parole until her 20-year sentence ended in 2015, unless the sentence was commuted by the President. When he was President, Alan García said he would consider a commutation only after the legal case had run its course.

In December 2011, a Peruvian court issued Berenson a three-week travel permit to visit her family in New York City. Authorities at the airport initially blocked her leaving, prompting fresh calls from her lawyer for Peruvian authorities to respect the decision of the Peruvian judiciary. She finally arrived on December 20. After spending Christmas and New Year's Day visiting her parents in New York, she returned to Lima, Peru on January 6, 2012. She remained on parole until the completion of her 20-year sentence on November 29, 2015, whereupon she was permitted to leave Peru permanently.

At midnight on December 2, 2015, Berenson left Lima on a flight to New York.

== In popular culture ==
The 2021 novel The Gringa by American author Andrew Foster Altschul is based on Berenson.
