= Petruzzi =

Petruzzi is an Italian surname. Notable people with the surname include:

- Fabio Petruzzi (born 1970), Italian footballer
- Jaime Castillo Petruzzi, Chilean communist militant
