= Mladen Mladenov =

Mladen Mladenov may refer to:

- Mladen Mladenov (wrestler)
- Mladen Mladenov (diplomat)
