= Japanese embassy hostage crisis =

1996–1997 hostage crisis in Lima, Peru

- Part of the internal conflict in Peru
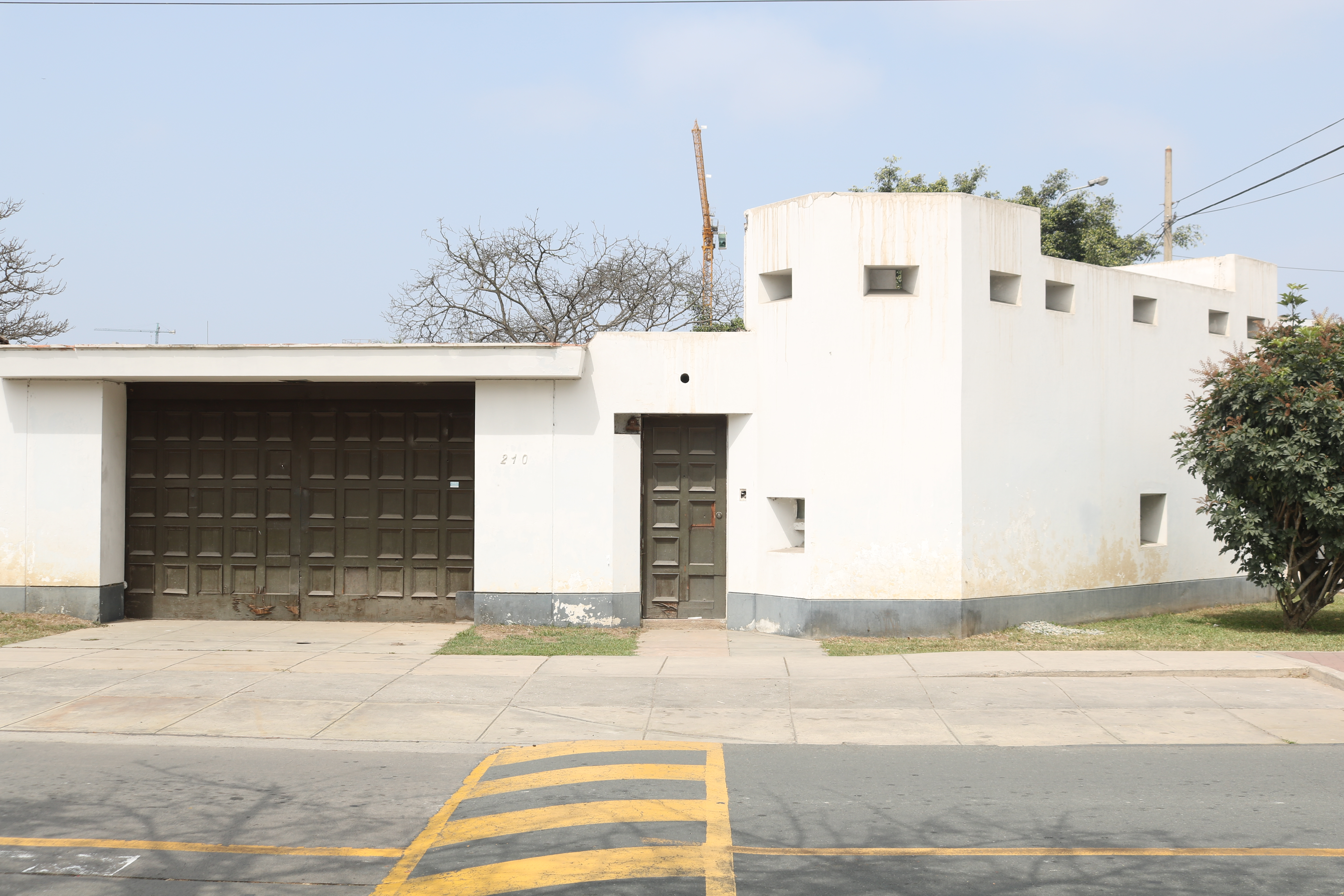
- The former building's entrance in 2018
- Location: 12°05′29″S 77°02′58″W: San Isidro, Lima, Peru
- Date: 17 December 1996 – 22 April 1997
- Target: Japanese embassy residence
- Attack type: Hostage-taking
- Deaths: See Operation Chavín de Huántar
- Injuries: 8
- Perpetrator: Túpac Amaru Revolutionary Movement
- Motive: Liberation of all emerretistas captured

The Japanese embassy hostage crisis (Spanish: Toma de la residencia del embajador de Japón en Lima, Japanese: 在ペルー日本大使公邸占拠事件, romanized: Zai Perū Nihon taishi kōtei senkyo jiken) began on 17 December 1996, when hundreds of high-level diplomats, government, and military officials and business executives, were taken hostage at the Japanese ambassador's residence in San Isidro District, Lima, Peru. The incident occurred after 14 members of the Túpac Amaru Revolutionary Movement (MRTA) blasted a hole through one of the residence's less-defended walls, interrupting a celebration of Emperor Akihito's 63rd birthday. Although the crisis took place at the ambassadorial residence rather than at the chancery, it is often referred to as the "Japanese embassy" hostage crisis.

Foreign female hostages were released during the first night and most foreigners were let go after five days of constant death threats. After being held hostage for 126 days, the remaining 72 dignitaries, which included then Japanese ambassador Morihisa Aoki, were freed on 22 April 1997, in a raid by Peruvian Armed Forces commandos, during which one hostage, two commandos, and all the MRTA militants were killed. The operation was perceived by most Peruvians to be a great success, and it gained worldwide media attention. President Alberto Fujimori initially received much credit for saving the lives of the hostages.

Reports later emerged alleging that a number of the insurgents were summarily executed after surrendering. Japanese diplomat Hidetaka Ogura testified that three of the rebels were tortured. Two of the commandos maintained that they saw Eduardo "Tito" Cruz alive and in custody before he was found with a bullet wound in his neck. These findings prompted civil suits against military officers by the relatives of dead militants. In 2005, the Attorney General's office in Peru allowed the charges and hearings were ordered. After public outcry, all charges were dropped; however, further investigations were referred to the Inter-American Court of Human Rights. It ruled in 2015 that Cruz had been the victim of an extrajudicial killing and that the Peruvian government violated international law. The court also named 25-year-old Victor Peceros and 17-year-old Herma Meléndez as victims deprived of their human rights.

== Hostage crisis ==
On the night of 17 December 1996, a party was held at the Japanese ambassador's residence in San Isidro District, Lima, Peru. The event was headed by ambassador Morihisa Aoki and commemorated the birthday of Emperor Akihito of Japan. In parallel, a group of 14 members of the Túpac Amaru Revolutionary Movement (MRTA) led by Néstor Cerpa Cartolini—formally the "Edgar Sánchez Command"—prepared to execute their plan, nicknamed "Operation Torre Condesú." The date had been carefully chosen by the group due to the number of important guests attending.

=== Beginning of the siege ===
At 8 pm PET (1:00 CST), an ambulance belonging to the Emergencia Clave 3 with the license plate OI-1359 arrived at the office of the Deutscher Entwicklungsdienst (DED, locally the Servicio Alemán de Cooperación Social-Técnica), located at number 255 of Guillermo Marconi, a street located behind the residence. The ambulance had reached the street after being let through by a police unit at the corner of the Clínica Italiana. The house's security guard, Jesús Sarase Prado, answered the doorbell, with two of the ambulance's occupants—in reality members of the MRTA—stating that they had arrived to transfer a patient. When Sarase replied that the house was empty, one of the men asked him to sign a document to verify that an error had been made. Once the door was opened, Sarase was threatened with a revolver and tied down, with the ambulance backing up hide the entrance of the ambulance's 12 other occupants and their equipment, which included AKM rifles, grenades, rocket launchers, ammo and mines. The ambulance was a 1992 Chevrolet model, sold to three men for US$ 13,500 by Homero Alva Bobadilla, a 42-year old former Edelnor worker born in Cajamarca who had invested his severance pay in an ambulance sold by the company. Alva had placed two adverts, first in September and then on the 10th of November. He was detained on the 18th due to him still being the vehicle's legal owner, and taken to the police's central building at Spain Avenue but being ultimately released due to having no connection to the three men who purchased the vehicle.

The group then headed towards the house's wall shared with the residence, placing an explosive charge that detonated at about 8:20 pm, allowing them access to the garden where the event was taking place. The men entered the event and subdued the people inside the residence, which was made easier due to a security protocol at the time that effectively made the embassies of Japan around the world gun-free zones. During the events, one of the rebels—Eduardo "Tito" Nicolás Cruz Sánchez—shot himself in the leg with his own AKM rifle, being treated by physicians Víctor Lucero and Ariel Frisancho.

The immediate panic led the security detail outside the residence to launch tear gas, and a shootout began between both parties. One of the rebels asked the ambassador to identify himself, which he did. Aoki was then given a loudspeaker to ask for a ceasefire, partially instructed by a member due to his poor Spanish. The hostages were then taken inside into the already crowded building. Soon after, Michael Minning, representative of the International Committee of the Red Cross (ICRC) in Peru, identified himself, asking to speak with the MRTA's representative. Minning spoke to Cerpa, explaining that the number of hostages would be an issue, and suggested that he let the women, elderly and ill leave, also offering to be a mediator between the group and the government. After deliberating with three other members, he accepted, with the selected hostages leaving at midnight. Also included in the group was José Buendía, a justice of the Supreme Court, due to the insistence of his wife. With the group gone, 381 men remained in the building, and the rebels turned more violent in their treatment of the hostages, demanding that nobody move.

The surprise ambush and seizure of the Japanese ambassador's residence was the highest profile operation of the group in its 15-year history. The attack propelled Peru in general, and the MRTA in particular, into the world spotlight for the duration of the crisis. The Japanese ambassador's residence had been fortified by the Japanese government. It was surrounded by a 12-foot wall, and had grates on all windows, bullet-proof glass in many windows, and doors built to withstand the impact of a grenade; therefore it was easily defendable from within.

News of the assault caused the Lima Stock Exchange to close three hours early, as domestic stocks plummeted. One newspaper political columnist commented, "It is a setback of at least four years. We've returned to being a country subject to terror." The news came during a period of low popularity for President Fujimori (down to 40% from a 1996 high of 75%), who had until then been credited with restoring peace to the country after terrorist activity largely ceased through the country during his first presidential term.

The Clínica Italiana, a clinic located on the same block of the residence, was closed due to the hostage crisis and never re-opened, being ultimately demolished in 2013.

=== Government's reaction ===
On 22 December, Peruvian president Alberto Fujimori made his first public announcement on the hostage-taking in a televised four-minute speech. In his speech, he condemned the assailants, calling the MRTA assault "repugnant" and rejecting all MRTA demands. He did not rule out an armed rescue attempt, but said that he was willing to explore a peaceful solution to the situation. He also publicly indicated that he did not need help from foreign security advisors, following speculation that Peru was turning to foreign governments for assistance. Fujimori made his speech shortly after Cerpa announced that he would gradually release any hostages who were not connected to the Peruvian government. During the months that followed, the rebels released all female hostages and all but 72 of the men.

=== Demands ===
In the days immediately following the takeover, the ICRC acted as an intermediary between the government and members of the guerrilla group. Among the hostages were high officials of Peru's security forces, including Máximo Rivera, the chief of Peru's anti-terrorist police, DIRCOTE, and former chief Carlos Domínguez. Other hostages included Alejandro Toledo, who later became President of Peru, and Javier Diez Canseco, a socialist Peruvian congressman. The 24 Japanese hostages included President Fujimori's own mother and younger brother.

The insurgents made a series of demands:

- The release of their members from prisons around Peru (including recently convicted US activist Lori Berenson and Cerpa's wife).
- A revision of the government's neoliberal free market reforms.
- They singled out Japan's foreign assistance program in Peru for criticism, arguing that this aid benefited only a narrow segment of society.
- They also protested against what they claimed were cruel and inhumane conditions in Peru's jails.

Leftist politician Javier Diez Canseco was among the 38 men who were released soon after the hostages were taken. He defended the MRTA and called for the government to negotiate a settlement. Diez Canseco said that the hostage-takers are "18 to 20 years old, maybe 21 ... They're a group of special forces, commandos. I think they're young men who want to live. They don't want to die."

Upon being freed, Alejandro Toledo said that what the MRTA really wanted was an amnesty that would allow its members to participate in public life. He said that any attempt to rescue the hostages by force would be "insane," as they were "armed to the teeth." Rooms in the building, he said, were wired with explosives, as was the roof. He added that the militants had anti-tank weapons and wore backpacks that were filled with explosives that could be detonated by pulling a cord on their chest.

=== Negotiations ===
In search for a peaceful solution, Fujimori appointed a team to hold talks with the MRTA, including the Canadian ambassador Anthony Vincent, who had briefly been a hostage, Archbishop Juan Luis Cipriani, and a Red Cross official. Fujimori even talked with the Cuban leader Fidel Castro, raising media speculation that a deal was being worked out to let the MRTA guerrillas go to Cuba as political exiles. However, it was reported on 17 January that negotiations with the MRTA had stalled.

In early February, a new squad of Peruvian troops with heavy equipment took over the embassy vigil. They played loud military music and made provocative gestures to the rebels, who unleashed a burst of gunfire. This prompted the Prime Minister of Japan, Ryutaro Hashimoto, to publicly urge Peru to refrain from taking any unnecessary risks that could endanger the hostages' lives. Japanese leaders pressured Fujimori to reach some sort of negotiated settlement with the MRTA in order to ensure the hostages' safe release.

Fujimori subsequently met Hashimoto in Canada. The two leaders announced that they were in agreement on how to handle the hostage situation but provided few details.

On 10 February, Fujimori travelled to London, where he announced that the purpose of his trip was to "find a country that would give asylum to the MRTA group." Observers noted that his request that the MRTA group be given political asylum contradicted his previously stated position that the MRTA were not guerrillas but terrorists. On 11 February, Fujimori declared that "Peruvian prisons are built in accordance with international standards for terrorists." He also attended business meetings, which he described to his domestic audience as an "exercise in reassuring the international investors."

=== Military solution ===
In February, Peruvian newspaper La República reported the existence of a secret government "intervention plan," involving the direct participation of U.S. military forces. The plan was reportedly devised by Navy Admiral and Director of Peru's Army Intelligence Agency, Antonio Ibarcena and submitted to Fujimori. On 17 February, The New York Times wrote, "United States participation in the assault is crucial, according to the plan, which said that the commandos would come from the Peruvian Army's School of Commandos and the United States Southern Command, based in Panama."

The MRTA called off the talks with the government in March when they reported hearing loud noises coming from beneath the floor of the residence. Peruvian newspapers confirmed the MRTA suspicions, reporting that the police were digging tunnels underneath the building. The police tried to cover up noise from the digging by playing loud music over loudspeakers and carrying out noisy tank maneuvers through the nearby streets.

According to the New York Times, Canadian ambassador Anthony Vincent stated "in hindsight, some believed that the commission of guarantors [of which he was a member] had served as little more than a cover to give [Fujimori] time to put in place the physical and political elements for a raid;" he believed that "both sides were close to settlement" when Fujimori opted instead for a military assault.

== Operation Chavín de Huantar ==
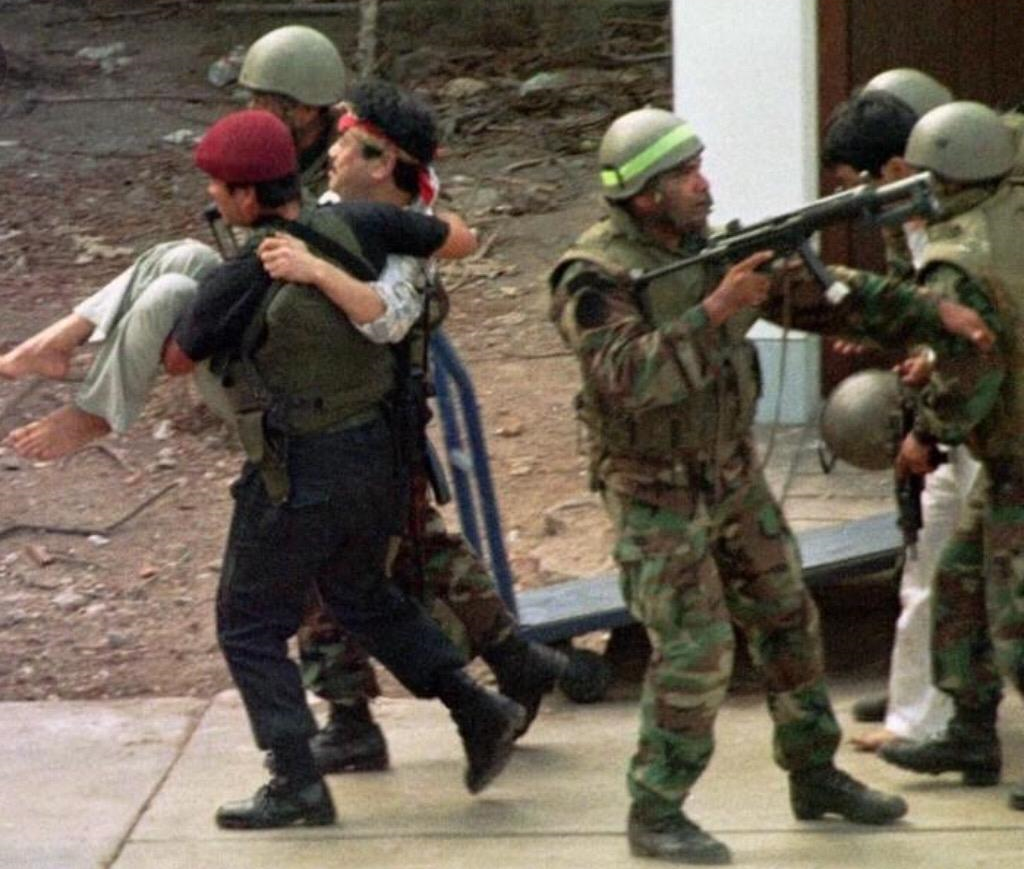
Peruvian forces rescuing a Japanese diplomat.

=== Preparations ===
In preparation for the raid, Peruvian Navy Admiral and former commander of a special operations group, Antonio Ibarcena distributed hundreds of bugged items to the hostages. One of which included his personal guitar given to hostage Luis Giampietri (later elected Vice President of Peru for the term 2006–2011) to help pass the time in which Antonio Ibarcena installed a miniature two-way radio and gave encrypted instructions to warn the hostages ten minutes before the military operation began, telling them to stay as far away as possible from the MRTA members.

Light-colored clothes were systematically ferried in to the hostages, so that they could be distinguished easily from the dark-clad insurgents during the planned raid. Cerpa himself unwittingly helped with this part of the project when, upon hearing noises that made him suspect that a tunnel was being dug, he ordered all the hostages placed on the second floor.

In addition, sophisticated miniature microphones and video cameras had been smuggled into the residence, concealed in books, water bottles, and table games. Giampietri and other military officers among the hostages were given the responsibility for placing these devices in secure locations around the house. Eavesdropping on the MRTA commandos with the help of these high-tech devices, military planners observed that the insurgents had organized their security carefully, and were particularly alert during the night hours. However, early every afternoon, eight of the MRTA members, including the four leaders, played indoor football for about one hour.

Fujimori later unveiled a scale model of the building that was especially built to prepare for the rescue operation, which included the tunnels from adjacent houses used by commandos to enter the building.

=== Special forces raid ===
On 22 April 1997, more than four months after the beginning of the siege, a team of 140 Peruvian commandos, assembled into a secret ad hoc unit given the name Chavín de Huantar (in reference to a Peruvian archaeological site famous for its underground passageways), mounted a dramatic raid on the residence. At 15:23:00 that afternoon, Operation Chavín de Huántar began.

Three explosive charges exploded almost simultaneously in three different rooms on the first floor. The first explosion hit in the middle of the room where the football game was taking place, killing three of the hostage-takers; two of the men involved in the game and one of the women watching. Through the hole created by that blast and the other two explosions, 30 commandos stormed into the building, chasing the surviving MRTA members in order to stop them before they could reach the second floor.

Two other moves were made simultaneously with the explosions. In the first, 20 commandos launched a direct assault at the front door in order to join their comrades inside the waiting room, where the main staircase to the second floor was located. On their way in, they found the two other female MRTA militants guarding the front door. Behind the first wave of commandos storming the door came another group of soldiers carrying ladders, which they placed against the rear walls of the building.

In the final prong of the coordinated attack, another group of commandos emerged from two tunnels that had reached the back yard of the residence. These soldiers quickly scaled the ladders that had been placed for them. Their tasks were to blow out a grenade-proof door on the second floor, through which the hostages would be evacuated, and to make two openings in the roof so that they could kill the MRTA members upstairs before they had time to execute the hostages.

At the end, all 14 MRTA guerrillas, one hostage (Carlos Giusti Acuña, a member of the Supreme Court, who had pre-existing heart health problems) and two soldiers (Colonel Juan Valer Sandoval and Captain Raúl Jiménez Chávez) died in the assault.

According to the U.S. Defense Intelligence Agency (DIA), MRTA member Roli Rojas was discovered attempting to walk out of the residence mixed with the hostages. A commando spotted him, took him to the back of the house, and executed him with a burst that blew off Rojas' head. The DIA cable says that the commando's intent had been to shoot just a single round into Rojas' head and that, due to the mistake of many rounds being fired, the commando had to partially hide Rojas' body under that of Cerpa, who had also died in the raid. The cable also says that another (female) MRTA member was executed after the raid.

=== Fujimori's role ===
According to a Defense Intelligence Agency report, Fujimori personally ordered the commandos participating in the raid to "take no MRTA alive."

As the commandos tore down the flag of the MRTA that had been flying at the roof of the embassy, Fujimori joined some of the former hostages in singing the Peruvian national anthem. Peruvian TV also showed Fujimori striding among the dead guerrillas; some of the bodies were mutilated. Fujimori was famously photographed walking past the bodies of Cerpa and Rojas in the main staircase of the residence, and Rojas' destroyed head is noticeable in the photograph. Shortly thereafter President Fujimori was seen riding through Lima in a bus carrying the freed hostages.

The military victory was publicized as a political triumph and used to bolster his hard-line stance against armed insurgent groups. His popularity ratings quickly doubled to nearly 70 percent, and he was acclaimed a national hero. "You had to live in the climate of the time. The operation was so successful that there was no opposition. Peruvians loved it", said historian Luis Jochamowitz, author of a biography of Fujimori. Reflecting on the raid a few days afterwards, Antonio Cisneros, a leading poet, said it had given Peruvians "a little bit of dignity. Nobody expected this efficiency, this speed. In military terms it was a First World job, not Third World."

Fujimori also took personal credit for the operation. In an interview with the 17 December 1997 edition of El Comercio, Fujimori stated that shortly after the embassy residence was seized, he had planned the operation together with the National Intelligence Service headed by Julio Salazar and Vladimiro Montesinos, and the Joint Command of the Armed Forces under Army Commander General Nicolás de Bari Hermoza Ríos.

=== MRTA corpses detained ===
When the operation was over, the bodies of the guerrillas were removed by military prosecutors; representatives from the Attorney General's Office were not permitted entry. The corpses were not taken to the Institute of Forensic Medicine for autopsy as required by law. Rather, the bodies were taken to the morgue at the Police Hospital. It was there that the autopsies were performed. The autopsy reports were kept secret until 2001. Next of kin of the deceased were not allowed to be present for the identification of the bodies and the autopsies. The bodies were buried in secrecy in cemeteries throughout Lima.

Eligia Rodríguez Bustamante, the mother of one of the guerrillas, and the Deputy Director of APRODEH asked the Attorney General's Office to take the necessary steps to identify those who died during the rescue, but the Attorney General's Office conceded its jurisdiction over identification of the deceased MRTA members to the military justice system.

=== International reaction ===
In general, the military operation was viewed with positive eyes by other governments. Several Andean Presidents (Ernesto Samper of Colombia, Gonzalo Sánchez de Lozada of Bolivia and Rafael Caldera of Venezuela) supported Alberto Fujimori's decisions. This was made a public declaration of the IX Andean Presidential Council. However, there were some exceptions:

- On 25 April there were protests at the Peruvian Embassy in Santiago, Chile. Riot police tear gassed demonstrators and pushed them to the ground outside the embassy. Some protesters told television reporters, "We absolutely reject these acts of such cruelty, which should never happen again."
- On the same date, the Chilean Ministry of Foreign Affairs declared: "The Chilean Government has manifested its satisfaction with the outcome of this crisis. It is true that we must regret the death of several human lives, but is also important to acknowledge that there was no other possible outcome."
- In Mexico City on 23 April, scores of people gathered at the Peruvian Embassy to protest. Demonstrators hurled red paint and tomatoes at the building, shouting "Fujimori murderer" and "Latin America is in mourning."
- On 28 April, an article in The New York Times commented on the government's dependency on the military, describing Fujimori, Montesinos and armed forces head Gen. Nicolás Hermoza Ríos as "Peru's ruling troika".

=== MRTA view ===
In an interview in the 24 April edition of the German newspaper Junge Welt, MRTA spokesperson Norma Velasco assessed the developments leading up to the raid, saying that "The goal of the MRTA unit was not to murder the embassy prisoners," but rather to achieve their demand to free the 450 MRTA prisoners held in Peru's prisons. Saying that "we had no illusions" that Fujimori wanted a peaceful solution, Velasco added, "we did have some bit of hope that international public opinion in many countries would increase pressure on the Peruvian government and force them to give in." Alluding to the underlying economic conditions of the country, she observed: "A vast segment of the population still suffers from poverty, hunger and a lack of proper medical care, and these problems are increasing. The end of the crisis at the ambassador's residence showed that Fujimori exclusively relies on military means."

== Hostages ==
The hostages, initially in the hundreds, were eventually reduced to a final 72. Among them were:

=== Executive branch ===
- Francisco Tudela van Breugel-Douglas, Minister of Foreign Affairs
- Rodolfo Muñante Sanguinetti, Minister of Agriculture.
- Dante Córdova Blanco, former Minister of Education.
- Sandro Fuentes Acurio, former Minister of Labour.
- Jorge San Román de la Fuente, Vice Minister of Energy.
- Felipe Ramírez Delpino, Vice Minister of Regional Development.
- Rodolfo Matsuda, Vice Minister of Agriculture.
- Juan Mendoza Marsano, Vice Minister of Mines.
- Carlos Tsuboyama Matsudo, Vice Minister of the Presidency
- Ricardo Kamiya, Secretary General of the Presidency.
- Máximo Rivera Díaz, head of the National Directorate Against Terrorism.
- Juan Carlos Domínguez, former head of the National Directorate Against Terrorism.

=== Judicial branch ===
- Moisés Pantoja, president of the Supreme Court.
- Luis Serpa Segura, former president of the Judiciary.
- Moisés Pantoja Rodulfo, former president of the Judiciary.
- Mario Urrelo Álvarez, Member of the Supreme Court.
- Nelson Reyes Ríos, Member of the Supreme Court.
- Hugo Sivina Hurtado, Member of the Supreme Court.
- Carlos Ernesto Giusti Acuña, Member of the Supreme Court (ultimately the only hostage killed in the 1997 raid).
- Alipio Montes de Oca Begazo, Member of the Supreme Court.
- Mario Urrelo Álvarez, Member of the Supreme Court.
- José Garrido Garrido, Member of the Supreme Court.

=== Congress ===
- Javier Díez-Canseco Cisneros, congressman.
- Luis Chang Ching, third vice president of congress, president of the economy commission.
- Carlos Blanco Oropeza, congressman.
- Gilberto Siura Céspedes, congressman.
- Eduardo Pando Pacheco, congressman.
- Samuel Matsuda Nishimura, congressman.

=== Academics and businesspeople ===
- Alejandro Toledo Manrique, economic analyst, former presidential candidate.
- Gustavo Saberbein, former Minister of Economy.
- Luis Giampietri Rojas, Admiral of the Peruvian Navy.
- Alexander Kouri Bumachar, Mayor of Callao.
- Fernando Andrade, mayor of the district of Miraflores.
- Francisco Sagasti, academic, engineer, later president (2020-21).
- Javier Sota Nadal, then Rector of the National University of Engineering.
- Manuel Paredes Manrique, Rector of San Marcos University.
- Juan Julio Wicht, Jesuit priest.
- Mutsue Inomoto, Mother of then President Alberto Fujimori.
- Juana Fujimori Fujimori, sister of then President Alberto Fujimori.
- Rosa Fujimori Fujimori, sister of then President Alberto Fujimori.
- Pedro Fujimori Fujimori, brother of then President Alberto Fujimori.
- Juan Günther Doering, architect.
- Alvaro Chocano, president of the National Jury of Elections
- Ramiro de Valdivia Cano, member of the National Jury of Elections.
- Rómulo Muñoz Arce, member of the National Jury of Elections.
- Alfredo Torres Guzmán, director of the polling company Apoyo.
- Manuel Torrado, Spanish businessman, president of the polling company Datum.
- Juan Assereto Duharte, then director of COPRI.
- Samuel Gleiser Katz, President of the Lima Chamber of Commerce.
- Juan Enrique Pendavis Perales, president of the Association of Exporters (ADEX)
- Sally Bowen, President of the Foreign Press Association in Peru.

=== Diplomats ===
- Estanislao de Grandes, Chargé d'affaires (a.i), Spanish Embassy in Peru.
- Heribert Woeckell, German ambassador to Peru.
- Artur Schuschnigg, Austrian ambassador to Peru.
- Ambassadors of Belgium, the Netherlands and Romania in Peru.
- Juan Antonio Ibañez Echeverría, consul of Argentina.
- Dimitar Stanoev, Bulgarian ambassador to Peru.
- Wojciech Tomaszewski, Polish ambassador to Peru.
- Jorge Gumucio Granier, Bolivian ambassador to Peru.
- Antonio Araníbar, brother of the Bolivian chancellor.
- Carlos Luiz Coutinho Perez, Brazilian ambassador to Peru.
- Anthony Vincent, Canadian ambassador to Peru and head of the "guarantors commission" in charge of negotiations between the MRTA and the government.
- Lee Won-Young, South Korean ambassador to Peru.
- Pedro Díaz Arce, Cuban ambassador to Peru.
- José Raúl Silva, Cuban councillor in Peru.
- Samy Tawfik Ismail, Egyptian ambassador to Peru.
- Alkiviades Karokis, Greek ambassador to Peru.
- José María Argueta, Guatemalan ambassador to Peru.
- Eduardo Martell, Honduran ambassador to Peru.
- Joel Salpak, Israeli ambassador to Peru.
- Morihisa Aoki, Japanese ambassador to Peru (as well as 17 other embassy diplomats and the ambassador's German Shepherd, Emma).
- Ahmad Mokhtar Selat, Malaysian ambassador to Peru.
- Carlos Luis Linares, Panamanian ambassador to Peru.
- José Ramón Díaz Valdeparez, Dominican ambassador to Peru.
- João Melo de Sampaio, Chargé d'affaires of the European Union.
- Tabaré Bocalandro Yapeyú, Uruguayan ambassador to Peru.
- Horacio Arteaga, Venezuelan ambassador to Peru.
- Ľubomír Hladík, Chargé d'affaires (a.i) of the Czech Republic to Peru.
- Július Grančák, Chargé d'affaires (a.i) of Slovakia to Peru.
- Jorge Gillighan, United Nations coordinator.
- Seven American representatives.
- Michel Minning, president of the International Red Cross delegation.
- Hyacinthe D'Montera, Cultural Attaché of France
- Hidetaka Ogura, Japanese diplomat.
- Armando Lecaros de Cossío, Peruvian diplomat.
- José Luis de Cossío y Ruiz de Somocurcio, Peruvian diplomat.
- José Carlos Mariategui Arellano, Peruvian diplomat.
- Jorge Morelli Pando, Peruvian diplomat.
- Manuel Roca Zela, Peruvian diplomat.

=== Distribution of the final 72 hostages ===
Room A		Room B	
Hostage	Occupation	Hostage	Occupation
Arturo López Pardo Figueroa	General EP	Carlos Domínguez Solís	General PNP
Máximo Rivera Díaz	General PNP	Julio Pinto Samanez	General PNP
Guillermo Bobbio Zevallos	General PNP	Hugo Vera Veliz	General PNP
Francisco Salinas Guerrero	Colonel PNP	Orlando Denegri Ayllón	Colonel FAP
Rowel Rivas Crisostomo	Colonel PNP	Jorge Negrete Salas	Colonel PNP
Alberto Castillo Mendivil	Colonel PNP	Jorge Villacorta Meza	Colonel PNP
Rómulo Zevallos Solano	Colonel PNP	Jaime Valencia Voyset	Colonel PNP
Gerardo Haro Iparraguirre	Colonel PNP	Marco Miyashiro Arashiro	Colonel PNP
Room C		Carlos Dall'orso de La Peña	Navy Cpt. AP
Hostage	Occupation	Alberto Heredia Ugarte	Fgt. Cpt. AP
Luis Giampietri Rojas	Vice Admiral AP	Room D	
Carlos Blanco Oropeza	Congressman	Hostage	Occupation
Julio Rivera Chávez	Colonel FAP	Francisco Tudela	Minister of Foreign Affairs
Roberto Fernández Frantzen	Lt. Col. EP	Morihisa Aoki	Japanese Ambassador to Peru
Luis Chang Ching	Congressman	Juan Julio Wicht Rosell	Priest
Felipe Ramírez Delpino	Viceminister - Regional Development	Samuel Matsuda Nishimura	Congressman
Juan Mendoza Marsano	Viceminister - Mines	Gilberto Siura Céspedes	Congressman
Rodolfo Muñante Sanguineti	Minister of Agriculture	Jorge San Román de La Fuente	Viceminister - Energy.
Eduardo Pando Pacheco	Congressman	Jorge Gumucio Granier	Bolivian Ambassador to Peru
Oscar Pajares Merino	Major PNP	Jorge Valdez Carrillo	Peruvian ambassador
Rodolfo Matsuda Matsuda	Viceminister - Agriculture	Misahiro Sakai	1st Japanese Secretary
Room E		Pedro Fujimori Fujimori	Businessman
Hostage	Occupation	Akihisa Oguiyama	2nd Japanese Secretary
José Hamagushi Sakagushi	Executive at Fujita Gumi	Pedro Aritomi Aritomi	Peruvian businessman
Tadashi Iwamoto	Executive at Tomen Perú	Dante Córdova Blanco	Former Minister of Production
Tadeo Kawahami	Executive at Pesquera FED	Room H	
Akira Miyashita	Executive at Mitsubishi	Hostage	Occupation
Yutaka Morizomo	Executive at Kanematsu	Carlos Tsuboyama Matsudo	Viceministro - Presidency
Keichi Saito	Executive at Marubeni	Carlos Giusti Acuña	Member of the Supreme Court
Yoshihiki Saki	Executive at Ajinomoto	Hugo Sivina Hurtado	Member of the Supreme Court
Shiguenori Sato	Executive at Nisho Iwai	Luis Serpa Segura	Member of the Supreme Court
Masa Nori Sugimaru	Executive at Nikko	Mario Urrelo Álvarez	Member of the Supreme Court
Shigeru Taki	Executive at Panasonic	Alipio Montes de Oca Begazo	Member of the Supreme Court
Masaru Tomita	Executive at Toyota	Moisés Pantoja Rodulfo	Member of the Supreme Court
Room I		José Garrido Garrido	Member of the Supreme Court
Hostage	Occupation		
Yoshiaki Kitagawa	Businessman		
Masami Kobayashi	Businessman		
Hiroyuki Kimoto	Japanese Minister Counselor		
Fumio Sunami	1st Japanese Secretary		
Haruo Mimura	1st Japanese Secretary		
Hajime Nakae	1st Japanese Secretary		
Hidetaka Ogura	1st Japanese Secretary		
Katsumi Itagaki	2nd Japanese Secretary		
Hideo Nakamura	2nd Japanese Secretary		
Iroto Morozumi	2nd Japanese Secretary		
Sinji Yanamoto	Cultural attache		

== Executions controversy ==
Doubts about the official version of events soon began to arise. Some aspects of what happened during the rescue operation remained secret until the fall of the Fujimori government. Rumors began to circulate not long after the rescue operation that surrendered MRTA members had been executed extrajudicially:

- One Japanese hostage, Hidetaka Ogura, former first secretary of the Japanese Embassy, who published a book in 2000 on the ordeal, stated that he saw one rebel, Eduardo Cruz ("Tito"), tied up in the garden shortly after the commandos stormed the building. Cruz was handed over alive to Colonel Jesús Zamudio Aliaga, but along with the others he was later reported as having died during the assault.
- Former agriculture minister Rodolfo Muñante, declared in an interview eight hours after being freed that he heard one rebel shout "I surrender" prior to taking off his grenade-laden vest and turning himself over. Later, however, Muñante denied having said this.
- Another hostage, Máximo Rivera, then head of Peru's anti-terrorism police, said, in 2001, that he had heard similar accounts from other hostages after the raid.

Media reports also discussed a possible breach of international practices on taking of prisoners, committed on what they considered, under rules of diplomatic extraterritoriality, the equivalence of sovereign Japanese soil, and speculated that if charged, Fujimori could face prosecution in Japan. However, under the Vienna Convention, embassies and residencies do not enjoy extraterritoriality, but inviolability (immunity from search).

=== Initial legal proceedings ===
On 2 January 2001, the Peruvian human-rights organization APRODEH filed a criminal complaint on behalf of MRTA family members against Alberto Fujimori, Vladimiro Montesinos, Nicolás De Bari Hermoza Ríos, Julio Salazar Monroe and anyone found to be guilty of the crime of the qualified homicide of Eduardo Nicolás Cruz Sánchez and two other MRTA militants.

Special Provincial Prosecutor Richard Saavedra was put in charge of the preliminary inquiry into the complaint. Non-commissioned National Police officers Raúl Robles Reynoso and Marcial Teodorico Torres Arteaga corroborated Hidetaka Ogura's testimony, telling investigators that they took Eduardo Cruz Sánchez alive as he was attempting to escape by mingling with the hostages when they were at the house behind the residence.

In an interview in March, Ad Hoc Deputy Attorney Ronald Gamarra Herrera told CPN radio that Fujimori should face murder charges over the alleged executions: "[We have] information regarding how post-mortems were conducted on the dead MRTA rebels, which in opinion could corroborate accusations of extrajudicial killings." He said unofficial post-mortems plus reports by the UN, the U.S. State Department and rights groups, suggested rebels had been executed with a shot in the head. The state prosecutors ordered the exhumation of the insurgents' bodies.

Others, however, have stated that the investigation is just another attempt by Fujimori's political enemies to destroy his legacy. "Not giving in to terrorist blackmail is the only good thing remaining from the previous government. And now they want to destroy that like everything else," said Carlos Blanco, an independent congressman and one of the hostages.

=== Investigation ===
The bodies of the deceased MRTAs were exhumed and examined by forensic physicians and forensic anthropologists, experts from the Institute of Forensic Medicine, the Criminology Division of the National Police, and the Peruvian Forensic Anthropology Team, some of whom have served as experts for the International Criminal Tribunal for the Former Yugoslavia. Statements were taken from various officers who took part in the rescue operation and from some of the rescued hostages.

The examination done by the forensic anthropologists and forensic physicians revealed that Cruz Sánchez had been shot once in the back of the neck while in a defenseless posture vis-à-vis his assailant. Other forensic examinations established that it appears that eight of the guerrillas were shot in the back of the neck after capture or while defenseless because of injuries.

=== Prosecution against the army officers ===
On 13 May 2002, judge Cecilia Polack Boluarte issued warrants for the arrest of 11 senior army officers who participated in the raid. The warrants allowed the accused to be held for 15 days before formal charges were filed. The judge's decision provoked an outcry; the ministers of defense, justice and the interior all criticized the arrest orders. However, Attorney General Nelly Calderón supported the measure. In a statement made on 20 May 2002, to Radio Programas del Perú (RPP) she said, "We prosecutors are supporting the action taken by prosecutor Saavedra, because he has done a careful investigation (and) unfortunately the evidence suggests culpability. That evidence has to be collated to determine what degree of responsibility each arrested officer bears."

=== Amnesty ===
On 16 May 2002, two amnesty proposals were announced in congressional committees, one submitted by the American Popular Revolutionary Alliance party (APRA) of former president Alan García, the other by the National Unity party (UN). The UN bill "granted amnesty" to army General José Williams Zapata, who headed up the operation, and to the "official personnel who participated in the freeing and rescue of the hostages."

Human rights organizations such as Human Rights Watch (HRW) strongly protested the move. "The successful rescue of the hostages turned these commandos into national heroes, but the evidence of illegal killings is compelling. National gratitude is no reason for shielding them from justice." the organization argued in a press release. HRW argued that the amnesty proposals clearly conflicted with the principles enunciated by the Inter-American Court of Human Rights in its March 2001 ruling against the Peruvian government in the case of the 1991 Barrios Altos massacre. In that case, which involved the amnesty law passed in 1995 by the Fujimori government, the Court declared the amnesty null and void because it conflicted with Peru's human rights treaty obligations; it later interpreted that ruling as applicable to all similar cases.

=== Military and the judicial system ===
On 7 June 2002, at a ceremony organized by the army to commemorate loyalty to the national flag, the commandos were honored and decorated, including those whom the judicial branch had under investigation for alleged involvement in the extrajudicial executions. On 29 July, the Chavín de Huántar commando squad was selected to lead the independence day military parade. This appeared to have been done to exert more pressure on the Supreme Court justices who had to decide the jurisdiction question raised by the military court, in order to make certain that it would be the military court that investigated the extrajudicial executions.

On 16 August 2002, the Supreme Court convened to hear the oral arguments of the parties to the jurisdictional challenge brought by the military tribunal. The military prosecutor heading up the parallel inquiry being conducted in the military court, who had to bring the charges and prove them, was the person arguing the military's challenge. However, in his arguments he made a defense for the commandos, stating that "heroes must not be treated like villains." The Supreme Court subsequently ruled that the military court system had jurisdiction over the 19 officers, thus declining jurisdiction in favor of the military tribunal. It held that the events had occurred in a district that at the time was under a state of emergency, and were part of a military operation conducted on orders from above. It further held that any crimes that the 19 officers may have committed were the jurisdiction of the military courts. It also ruled that the civilian criminal courts should retain jurisdiction over anyone other than the commandos who may have violated civilian laws.

=== Inter-American Commission on Human Rights ===
On 3 February 2003, APRODEH, on behalf of MRTA family members, filed a petition with the Inter-American Commission on Human Rights against the Peruvian state, alleging that Peru violated certain rights recognized in the American Convention on Human Rights to the detriment of MRTA members Eduardo Nicolás Cruz Sánchez, David Peceros Pedraza and Herma Luz Meléndez Cueva, by detaining them and then summarily executing them. The Commission determined the petition was admissible.

=== Trial of Montesinos, Hermoza and Huaman ===
In 2007 the former head of Peru's security services, Vladimiro Montesinos, the former chief of the armed forces, Nicolas de Bari Hermoza, and retired Colonel Roberto Huaman went on trial for allegedly having ordered the extra-judicial killings of the MRTA hostage-takers. If convicted, Montesinos and the two former military officers faced up to 20 years in prison. Montesinos, Hermoza and Huaman were acquitted of those charges in 2012, as the court found that a chain of command linking the accused to the killings had not been proven.

== Chronology ==
- 17 December 1996: MRTA members take the Japanese ambassador's residence in Peru with more than 600 hostages. They soon release about half of the hostages.
- 20 December (day 3): Another 38 hostages are released.
- 21 December (day 4): Fujimori declares that there will be no talks.
- 22 December (day 5): 255 hostages are released.
- 26 December (day 9): An explosion is heard in the residence. Police say that an animal detonated a mine.
- 28 December (day 11): 20 hostages released.
- 31 December (day 14): A group of reporters are allowed into the mansion.
- 21 January (day 35): Police and MRTA members exchange shots.
- 2 March (day 75): MRTA members refused asylum to Cuba and Dominican Republic.
- 22 April (day 126): Peruvian special forces storm the residence. One hostage, two commandos and all 14 MRTA members were killed in action.

== Dramatisations and documentaries ==
- Endgame: The Untold Story of the Hostage Crisis in Peru (1999). A documentary that was broadcast as part of CNN's "Perspective" series.
- Black Ops: The Japanese Embassy Siege (2014). The hostage crisis was portrayed in episode 7 of season 2 of the documentary series "Black Ops".
- Lima: Breaking the Silence (1999 film)
- Tom Clancy's Rainbow Six: Rogue Spear's add-on "Black Thorn" included a stage of the military operation
- The hostage crisis is dramatized in an episode of the third season of the Canadian television series Zero Hour titled "The Lima Siege", aired in 2006.

=== Literary works ===
- Peruvian playwright Gaston Herrera Cagigao wrote the screenplay for a 2010 movie called "Rehenes" with Director Bruno Ortiz Leon in 2010 based on the events (see the four-minute trailer in Spanish on YouTube).
- Bel Canto by Ann Patchett is a novel loosely based on the events of the crisis. It was adapted under the same title into an opera and a film.
- The Ambassador's Word: Hostage Crisis in Peru 1996–97 by David J. Goldfield. A narrative account of the hostage taking focusing on the role of Canadian Ambassador Anthony Vincent, who initially was a hostage but was released to act as a mediator between the MRTA and the government.
- Japanese musician Miyuki Nakajima's song 4.2.3 in album be my child please in 1998 gives her opinion about this event.

== See also ==
- Japan–Peru relations
- FN P90
- Lima syndrome
- List of attacks on diplomatic missions
- List of hostage crises
- 1987 North Korean embassy attack in Lima
