= Jaime Castillo =

Jaime Castillo may refer to:

- Jaime Castillo (Canada), Canadian politician
- Jaime Castillo Petruzzi, Chilean militant active in the internal conflict in Peru
- Jaime Castillo Velasco (1914–2003), Chilean politician, Minister of Justice

== See also ==
- Jaime
