= List of ambassadors of Bulgaria to Peru =

Ambassador of Bulgaria to Peru
- Coat of arms of Bulgaria
- Ministry of Foreign Affairs
- Appointer: The president of Bulgaria
- Inaugural holder: Hristo Hristov (as chargé d'affaires (a.i.))
- Formation: October 15, 1969

The extraordinary and plenipotentiary ambassador of Bulgaria to the Republic of Peru is the official representative of the Republic of Bulgaria to the Republic of Peru.

A Bulgarian embassy operated in Lima until 1998, with the ambassador in Brasília being accredited since then.

== List of representatives ==
Name	Bulgarian	Term begin	Term end	Head of state	Notes
Hristo Hristov	Христо Христов	October 15, 1969	1970	Todor Zhivkov	As chargé d'affaires (a.i.).
Liuben Avramov	Любен Аврамов	December 11, 1970	1973	Todor Zhivkov	As ambassador.
Mladen Nikolov	Младен Николов	February 28, 1973	1978	Todor Zhivkov	As ambassador. Accredited to Bolivia from 1975 to 1979.
Nisim Koen	Нисим Коен	May 10, 1978	1982	Todor Zhivkov	As ambassador, a farewell ceremony was held at the National University of San Marcos.
Stoyan Venev	Стоян Венев	December 7, 1982	1986	Todor Zhivkov	As ambassador.
Tsanko Grigorov	Цанко Григоров	October 8, 1986	1990	Todor Zhivkov	As ambassador. He presented his credentials in October 1986.
Hristo Botsev	Христо Боцев	1990	1991	Todor Zhivkov	As chargé d'affaires (a.i.). Final representative of the People's Republic of Bulgaria.
Dimitar Sachkov	Димитър Сачков	1991	1992	Zhelyu Zhelev	As chargé d'affaires (a.i.).
Atanas Budev	Атанас Будев	1992	1995	Zhelyu Zhelev	As chargé d'affaires (a.i.).
Dimitar Stanoev	Димитър Станоев	1995	1998	Zhelyu Zhelev	Last resident chargé d'affaires (a.i.). He was a hostage during the 1996 Japanese embassy hostage crisis.
1998–present: Represented by the ambassador in Brasília

== See also ==
- List of ambassadors of Peru to Bulgaria
