= List of ambassadors of Peru to the Dominican Republic =

Ambassador of Peru to the Dominican Republic
- Great Seal of Peru
- Ministry of Foreign Affairs
- Appointer: The president of Peru
- Website: Embassy of Peru in the Dominican Republic

The extraordinary and plenipotentiary ambassador of Peru to the Dominican Republic is the official representative of the Republic of Peru to the Dominican Republic.

The ambassador in Santo Domingo is also accredited to Haiti. Prior to 1991, the ambassador resided in Port-au-Prince, with the first such representative being Alberto Pérez Sáez, named on October 6, 1955.

Both countries established relations on April 6, 1874, and have maintained them since. They were raised from legation to embassy level in 1956.

== List of representatives ==
Name	Portrait	Term begin	Term end	President	Notes
Juan de Osma y Pardo		?	1941	Óscar R. Benavides	As Envoy Extraordinary and Minister Plenipotentiary.
Eduardo Garland		1941	1943	Manuel Prado Ugarteche	As Envoy Extraordinary and Minister Plenipotentiary.
Luis Alvarado Garrido		1948	?	José Luis Bustamante y Rivero	As ambassador.
Julio Vargas-Prada		1964	1967	Fernando Belaúnde	As ambassador.
Benjamín Alejandro Ruiz Sobero		1994	1999	Alberto Fujimori	As ambassador.
Alberto Gálvez de Rivero		2000	2005	Alberto Fujimori	As ambassador.
Vicente Rojas Escalante		2005	2006	Alejandro Toledo	As ambassador.
Vicente Alejandro Azula de la Guerra		2007	2011	Alan García	As ambassador.
Enrique Alejandro Palacios Reyes		April 1, 2012	2017	Ollanta Humala	As ambassador.
Augusto Carlos Wilfredo Freyre Layzequilla		June 1, 2017	2021	Pedro Pablo Kuczynski	As ambassador.
María Cecilia Rozas Ponce De León		March 1, 2022	2026	Pedro Castillo	As ambassador.

== See also ==
- Dominican Republic–Peru relations
- List of ambassadors of the Dominican Republic to Peru
- List of ambassadors of Haiti to Peru
