= Francisco Soberón =

Peruvian human rights activist

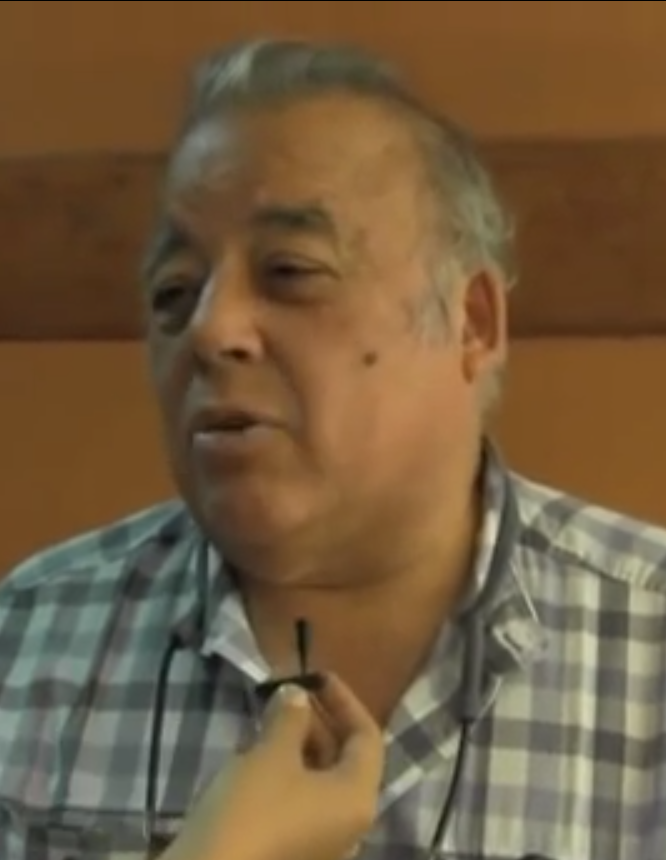
Francisco Soberón Garrido in 2012

Francisco Ricardo Soberón Garrido was a human rights activist in Peru. In 1983 he founded APRODEH, the non-governmental organization of which he is became a director. He also led the National Human Rights Coordinator's Office and was a member of the steering committee of the Coalition for the International Criminal Court. He was Vice President for South America of the International Federation of Human Rights from 1997 to 2001. He was awarded the National Order of Merit by the French government and the Letelier-Moffitt Human Rights Award by the Institute for Policy Studies. He died on October 7, 2022.
