= List of ambassadors of Haiti to Peru =

Ambassador of Haiti to Peru
- Coat of arms of Haiti
- Incumbent; Jean-Víctor Harvel Jean-Baptiste since September 17, 2015
- Style: His Excellency
- Residence: Santiago

The Haitian ambassador to Peru is the highest representative of the Republic of Haiti to the Republic of Peru. The ambassador is accredited from Santiago, formerly resident in Lima prior to the 1991 Haitian coup d'état.

== Background ==
Relations between both countries were established in the 20th century, elevated to embassy level on August 26, 1955. Both countries maintained resident diplomatic missions during this period until the 1990s, when the Peruvian embassy in the Haitian capital closed a few days prior to the 1991 Haitian coup d'état, with the embassy in Lima also closing soon after. Peru is since accredited to Haiti from its embassy in Santo Domingo, and has an honorary consulate in Port-au-Prince.

A small number of Haitians live in Peru, with most of them aiming to reach neighbouring countries instead of staying there. Meanwhile, blue helmets make up a significant part of Peruvian presence in Haiti.

== List of representatives ==
Name	Title	Term start	Term end	President	Notes
Léon Laleau				Sténio Vincent	
1955: Relations elevated to embassy level
Dantés Destinobles Adé	Amb.	November 18, 1955		Paul Magloire	First to serve as ambassador.
Arséne Pompée	Amb.	1961	1968	François Duvalier	
Roland Augustin	Amb.	December 11, 1989	June 17, 1994	Prosper Avril	Augustin delivered his credentials on December 11, 1989, and ceased to be recognised by Peruvian government in 1994 at the request of Jean-Bertrand Aristide.
1991: Resident embassies closed due to the coup d'état; the ambassador in Santiago becomes accredited instead
Jean-Víctor Harvel Jean-Baptiste	Amb.	September 17, 2015	Incumbent	Michel Martelly	Accredited from Santiago.

== See also ==
- List of ambassadors of Peru to Haiti
