= List of ambassadors of the Dominican Republic to Peru =

Ambassador of the Dominican Republic to the Republic of Peru
- Embajador de la República Dominicana en la República del Perú
- Coat of arms of the Dominican Republic
- Incumbent; César Florentino de Jesús Herrera Díaz since April 30, 2024
- Ministry of Foreign Affairs of the Dominican Republic; Embassy of the Dominican Republic in Peru
- Style: His/Her Excellency (formal); Mr./Madam Ambassador (informal)
- Type: Head of mission
- Reports to: Minister of Foreign Affairs of the Dominican Republic
- Residence: Los Álamos 562, San Isidro District, Lima
- Seat: Embassy of the Dominican Republic in Peru
- Nominator: President of the Dominican Republic
- Appointer: President of the Dominican Republic; with Senate advice and consent
- Term length: At the pleasure of the president
- Inaugural holder: Ernesto Sánchez Rubirosa
- Salary: US$5,000 (monthly)
- Website: per.mirex.gob.do

The Ambassador of the Dominican Republic to the Republic of Peru is the highest representative of the Dominican Republic to Peru.

Both countries established relations on April 6, 1874, and have maintained them since. They were raised from legation to embassy level in 1956.

== List of representatives ==
| Ambassador | Term start | Term end | President | Notes |
|---|---|---|---|---|
| Ernesto Sánchez Rubirosa | 1955 | | Héctor Trujillo | Sánchez presented his credentials on February 9, 1955. |
| Manuel del Cabral | ? | ? | Héctor Trujillo | |
| José Ramón Díaz Valdeparez | October 1993 | | Joaquín Balaguer | As ambassador. In 1996, he was a hostage during the Japanese embassy hostage crisis. |
| Iván Tomás Báez Brugal | 2000 | | Leonel Fernández | |
| Alfonso Tobal Ureña | January 2005 | 2007 | Leonel Fernández | |
| Rafael Antonio Julián Cedano | August 23, 2007 | 2017 | Leonel Fernández | |
| Daniel Guerrero Taveras | October 24, 2017 | 2021 | Danilo Medina | Died the same year after leaving office in Santo Domingo. |
| Alejandro Arias Zarzuela | March 22, 2021 | 2024 | Luis Abinader | |
| César Florentino de Jesús Herrera Díaz | April 30, 2024 | Incumbent | Luis Abinader | |

== See also ==
- Dominican Republic–Peru relations
- List of ambassadors of Peru to the Dominican Republic
