= Juan Valer =

Peruvian army lieutenant colonel (1958–1997)

Juan Valer Sandoval
- Born: September 1, 1958; Tumbes, Peru
- Died: April 22, 1997 (aged 38); Lima, Peru
- Cause of death: Gunshot wound
- Burial place: Jardines de la Paz
- Alma mater: Bartolomé Herrera School; Chorrillos Military School
- Spouse: Marina Collado (m. 1982)
- Children: 2
- Military career
- Allegiance: Peru
- Branch: Peruvian Army
- Service years: 1978–1997
- Rank: Lieutenant colonel Colonel (posthumous)
- Nickname: Chizito
- Unit: Chavín de Huántar Command
- Conflicts: Internal conflict in Peru: Operation Chavín de Huántar †

Juan Alfonso Valer Sandoval (September 1, 1958 — April 22, 1997) was a Lieutenant colonel of the Peruvian Army who served as a member of Chavín de Huántar Command, a unit of the Peruvian Armed Forces created in response to the Japanese embassy hostage crisis, being killed during the military operation that successfully put an end to the siege. He was subsequently elevated to colonel and declared a national hero of Peru.

== Biography ==
Valer was born on September 1, 1958, in Tumbes, Peru. He studied at Bartolomé Herrera, a public school in San Miguel District, Lima. He married Marina Collado Escuza in 1982, with whom he had two children: Valeria and Giovanni. The family lived at Cueva Street, located in Pueblo Libre, later renamed after Valer.

Following the start of the Japanese embassy hostage crisis, Valer volunteered to join the command in December 1996, being put in charge of the security group, whose foremost goal was the rescue of Foreign Minister Francisco Tudela, who had a personally assigned rebel with orders to immediately shoot him if a military action was attempted. During the rescue operations of April 22, 1997, Valer was fatally shot while evacuating the hostages, including Tudela, being evacuated by the command's support group and ultimately dying en route to the city's Military Hospital. Prior to entering the tunnels that led to the residence, he left behind a note to his family.

Valer was buried at Jardines de la Paz, a cemetery in La Molina District. His son, Giovanni, was a participant in Chavín De Huántar: The Rescue of the Century, a 2025 film based on the events.

== See also ==
- José Williams
- Francisco Tudela
