= APRODEH =

Peruvian non-governmental organization

Association for Human Rights
- Asociación Pro Derechos Humanos
- Abbreviation: APRODEH
- Formation: 1983; 43 years ago
- Founder: Francisco Soberón
- Founded at: Lima
- Headquarters: Jirón Pachacutec 980, Lima
- Director: Francisco Soberón
- Website: aprodeh.org.pe

The Association for Human Rights (Spanish: Asociación Pro Derechos Humanos; APRODEH) is a Peruvian human rights non-governmental organization. APRODEH works with many organizations both within and outside of Peru. Its current directors are Francisco Soberón and Miguel Jugo.

== History ==
The group was established in 1983 by a group of professionals who had been providing information to Peruvian congressmen involved with the Congressional Human Rights Commission, such as Javier Diez Canseco. The group supported legislative work in view of the growing human rights violations during the internal conflict in Peru. In 1985, APRODEH was among the founding members of the Coordinadora Nacional de Derechos Humanos del Perú.

The group has been controversial in the country, as it has been accused of being a political wing of the now defunct Revolutionary Vanguard. The group supported Japanese diplomat Hidetaka Ogura's claim of summary executions of three members of the Túpac Amaru Revolutionary Movement in 1997.

== See also ==
- Human rights in Peru
