= Dominican Republic–Peru relations =

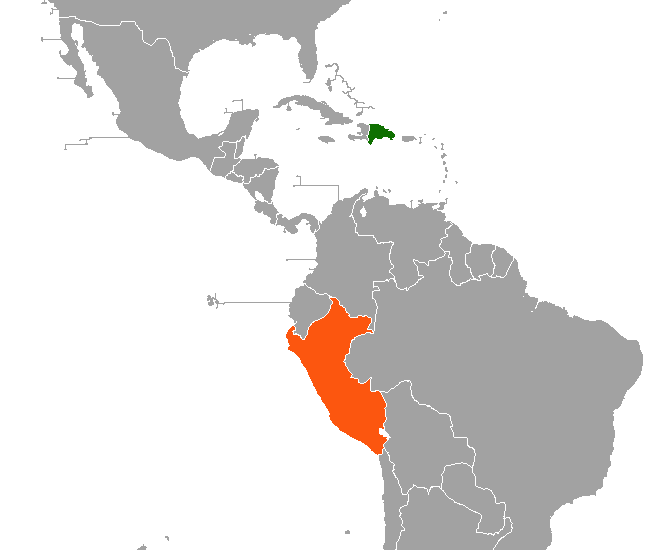
- Dominican Republic: Peru

Diplomatic mission
- Embassy of the Dominican Republic, Lima: Embassy of Peru, Santo Domingo

Dominican Republic–Peru relations are the bilateral relations between the Dominican Republic and Peru. Both countries are members of the Organization of American States and the United Nations, and embassies are maintained in both capital cities. Relations are described as friendly.

== History ==
Diplomatic relations between the Dominican Republic and Peru were formally established on April 6, 1874.

Bilateral meetings were held in September 2018 and March 2019, and a commercial office was opened by Peru in 2020.

== Tourism ==
Punta Cana's International Airport is one of the destinations serviced by Peru's flag carrier, LATAM Perú. It is also one of the most popular destinations por Peruvian tourists. After the restrictions of the COVID-19 pandemic were lifted and commercial travel was allowed again, Peruvian interest in Punta Cana increased by 122%, with prices lowering by 33%. In the first months of 2022, the island country received over 55 thousand Peruvian tourists, a 32% increase compared to 2019.

Both countries also cooperate to prevent drug trafficking.

== Trade ==
From January to August 2022, Dominican exports to Peru were valued at US$ 11.4 million in comparison to 2021, where they were valued at US$12.2 million. Peruvian imports were valued at US$69.6 million during this period and at US$117.9 in 2021. That year, Peru was the Dominican Republic's 24th trading partner worldwide, and the 8th in Latin America. The DR is Peru's main commercial destination to the Caribbean.

== Resident diplomatic missions ==
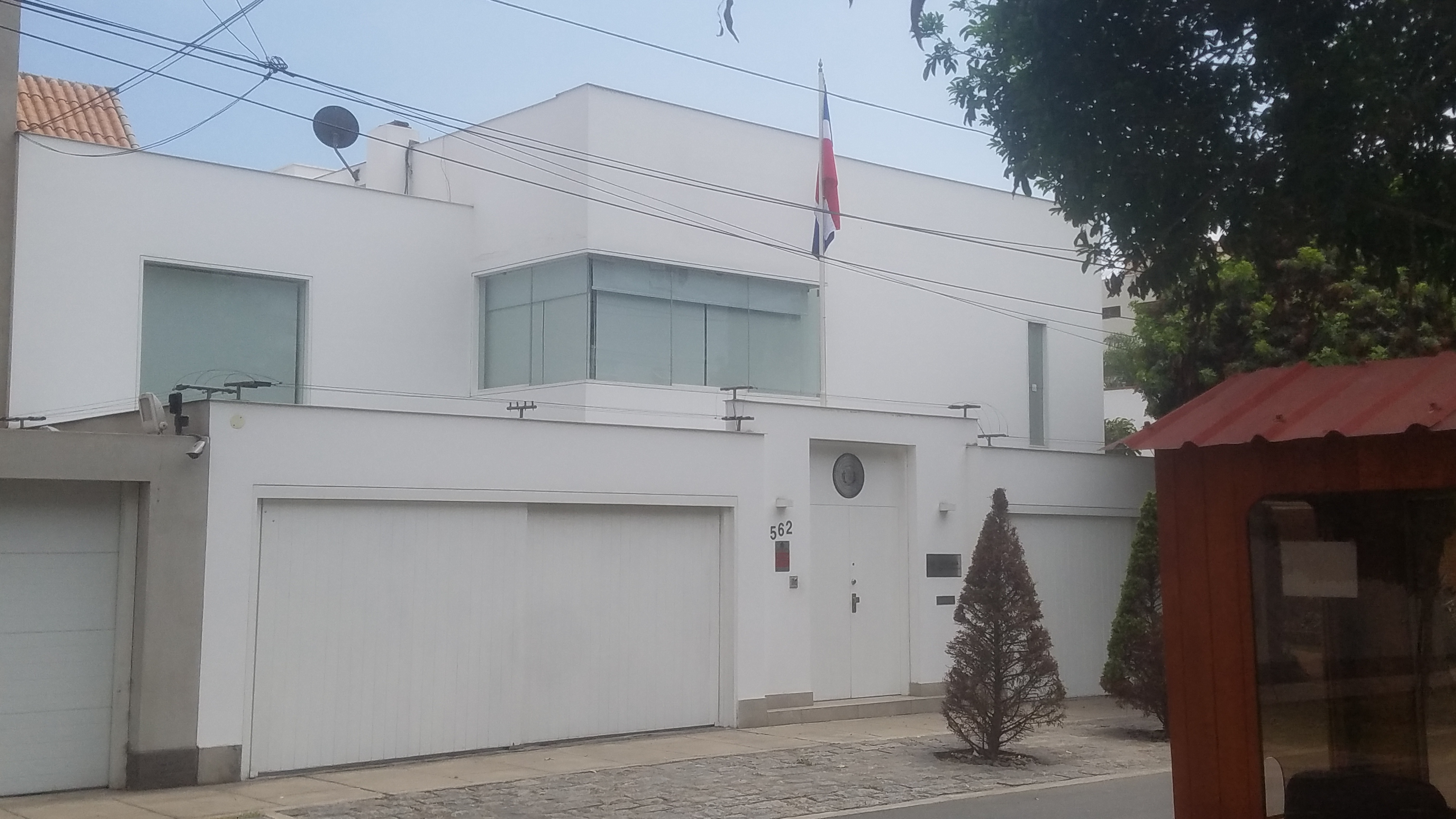
Dominican embassy in Lima

- The Dominican Republic has an embassy in Lima.
- Peru has an embassy and a commercial office in Santo Domingo.

== See also ==
- Foreign relations of the Dominican Republic
- Foreign relations of Peru
- List of ambassadors of the Dominican Republic to Peru
- List of ambassadors of Peru to the Dominican Republic
