= Chavín de Huántar Command =

Unit of the Peruvian Armed Forces

- Comando Chavín de Huántar
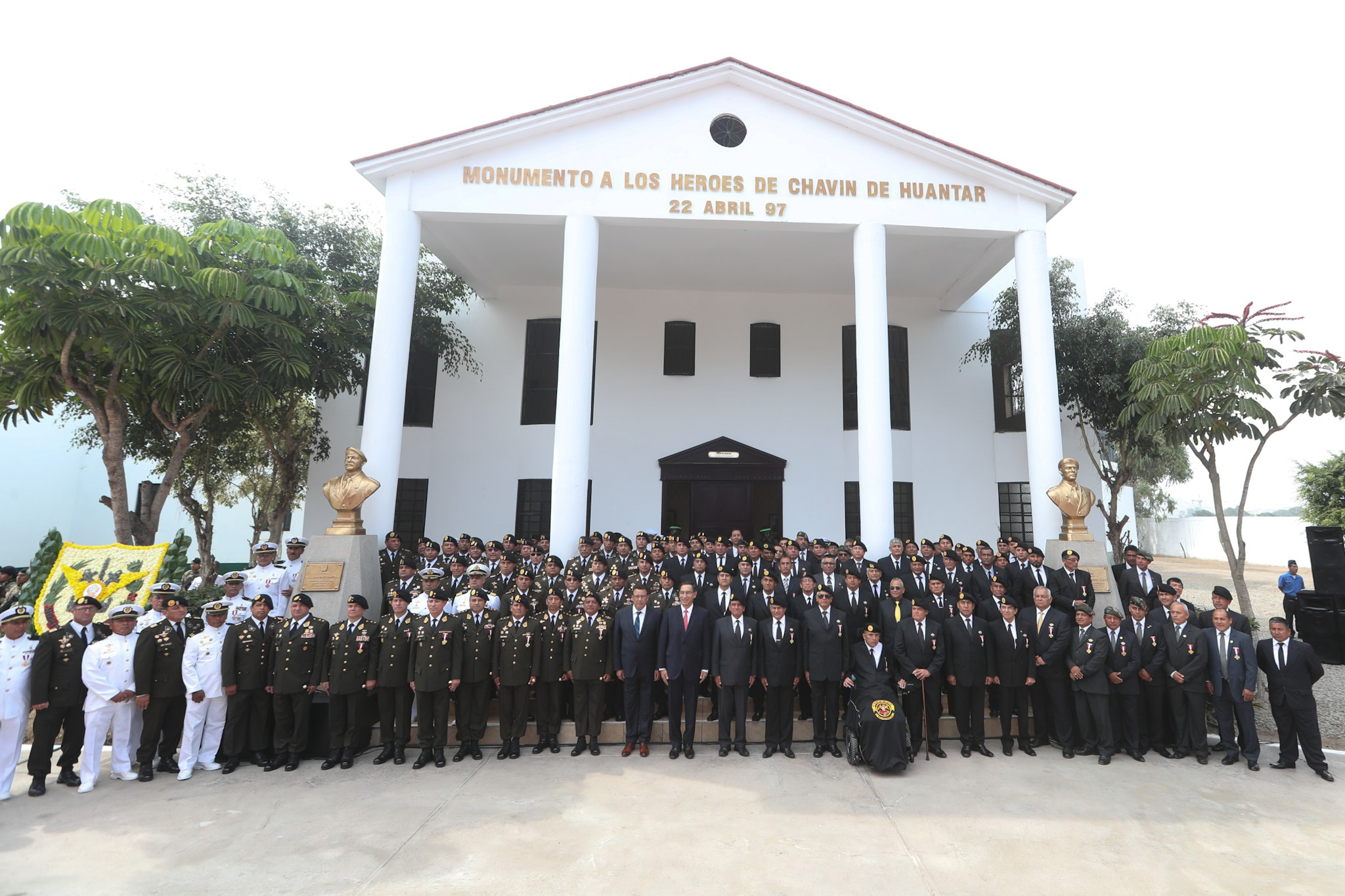
- Members during 21st anniversary celebrations
- Active: January 1, 1997
- Country: Peru
- Branch: Peruvian Armed Forces: Peruvian Army; Peruvian Navy
- Type: Special forces
- Role: Counterterrorism
- Size: 148 men
- Garrison/HQ: Chorrillos Military School
- Patron: Inca Pachacútec
- Motto(s): We did it for Peru
- Anniversaries: 22 April
- Engagements: Peruvian conflict: Japanese embassy hostage crisis; Operation Chavín de Huántar
- Decorations: See list

Commanders
- Notable commanders: José Williams

The Special Counterterrorist Company "Chavín de Huántar" No. 61, commonly known as Chavín de Huántar Command (Spanish: Comando Chavín de Huántar), is the elite unit of Peru's special forces. It is made up of members of the Peruvian Army and Navy. They became known internationally after successfully rescuing the 72 hostages captured by the Túpac Amaru Revolutionary Movement during the Japanese embassy hostage crisis, on April 22, 1997, which has been described as one of the most successful military rescue operations in history. For their work, they have been legislatively declared “Heroes of Democracy.”

== Decorations ==
- 2017: Heroes of Democracy (Spanish: Héroes de la Democracia), granted by the Congress of Peru.
- 2018: Military Order of Ayacucho, granted by president Pedro Pablo Kuckzynski.
- 2018:Defenders of Democracy, shared with tunnel engineers. Granted by Congress.
- 2019: Order of Merit, Grand Cross and Grand Officers, granted by president Martín Vizcarra.

== See also ==
- Peruvian conflict
- Japanese embassy hostage crisis
