= Luis Jochamowitz =

Peruvian journalist and writer (born 1953)

Luis Jochamowitz (born 1953 in Lima) is a Peruvian journalist and writer.

Jochamowitz has worked for the Peruvian magazines Variedades and Caretas. In 1993, while Alberto Fujimori was president of Peru, he published Ciudadano Fujimori ("Citizen Fujimori"). He has also published El descuartizador del Hotel Comercio ("The Dismemberer of Hotel Comercio", 1995) and Vladimiro (2002, about Vladimiro Montesinos). Jochamowitz's work also includes fiction such as Contra Dicciones ("Against Dictions") and Última Noticia ("Last News").
