= Operation Chavín de Huántar =

1997 Peruvian military rescue operation

- Part of the Japanese embassy hostage crisis
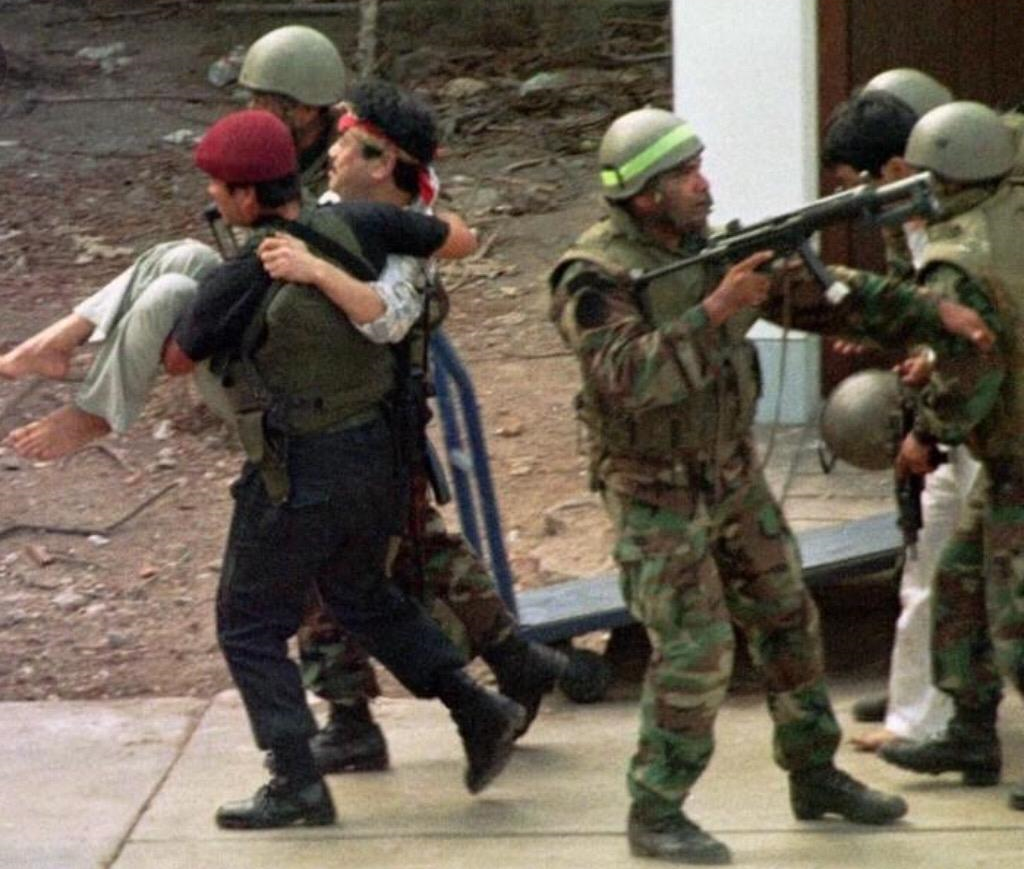
- A Japanese diplomat is evacuated during the events
Date	April 22, 1997; 3:23 pm PET (8:23 CST)
Location	Japanese embassy residence in Lima
Result	Government victory; All 72 hostages rescued (Note: One of the hostages would die of his injuries while en route to a hospital.); Effective dissolution of the MRTA

Belligerents
Peruvian Armed Forces	Túpac Amaru Revolutionary Movement

Commanders and leaders
Alberto Fujimori; José Williams	Néstor Cerpa †; Roli Rojas †

Strength
148 special forces	14 MRTA rebels

Casualties and losses
2 members killed 25 members wounded	All 14 rebels killed 1 flag captured
- 1 Peruvian hostage killed

Operation Chavín de Huántar, (Note: Spanish: Operación Chavín de Huántar; Japanese: チャビン・デ・ワンタル作戦) originally Operation Nipón 1996, was a military operation organised by the government of Peru and carried out by a special joint command of the Peruvian Armed Forces on April 22, 1997. It ended the 126-day Japanese embassy hostage crisis through a raid that rescued all remaining 72 hostages held by the Túpac Amaru Revolutionary Movement (MRTA) at the Japanese embassy's residence in San Isidro District, Lima. It is considered one of the most successful hostage rescues in history.

In parallel to the talks held by representatives of both parties during the siege, a replica of the ambassadorial residence was built in Las Palmas Air Base on the orders of Vladimiro Montesinos, who assigned Army commander Roberto Huamán Azcurra as supervisor of the project. The building served as a training ground for the newly formed Chavín de Huántar Command, named after the planned operation and headed by José Williams.

The operation saw the deaths all MRTA members involved in the siege, which led to the group's effective dissolution and a subsequent investigation into reports of summary executions. Two members of the 148-member command, Juan Valer and Raúl Jiménez, were also killed in action, with 25 others wounded. The sole hostage to be killed was Carlos Giusti, a member of the Supreme Court of Peru, who died en route to the city's Military Hospital.

== Operation ==
=== Preparation ===
The name Chavín de Huántar was chosen for the operation because to make the incursion possible, tunnels were to be dug under the ambassador's residence from adjacent buildings. Chavín de Huántar is an archeological site in the central highlands of Peru which is famous for its underground passageways. It is said that President Alberto Fujimori himself came up with the name.

The rescue operation was prepared and exercised in an exact replica of the residence located at the nearby Chorrillos Military School; there the commandos practiced every detail of the operation, including the weight of the explosives to be used to open the floor of the residence.

Key to the operation was the intelligence provided by Luis Giampietri, admiral of the Peruvian Navy at the time and former commander of a special operations group. He received and distributed hundreds of bugged items in the building and himself communicated by radio with the Peruvian military.

=== Assault ===
Over the course of the assault on 22 April 1997, 19-year-veteran Colonel Juan Alfonso Valer Sandoval, 11-year-veteran Captain Raúl Gustavo Jiménez Chávez, and Supreme Court Justice Dr. Carlos Ernesto Giusti Acuña were killed. All fourteen of the rebels were killed by Peruvian special forces operators armed with FN P90s. The success of the operation was tainted by subsequent claims, backed by several witnesses, that at least three and possibly eight of the rebels had been summarily executed by the operators after surrendering. There are also rumours that Vladimiro Montesinos, Chief of Military Intelligence, ordered the execution of Supreme Court Justice Dr. Carlos Giusti, the only hostage who died, and Francisco Tudela, who nonetheless survived, who were political rivals of Alberto Fujimori. Colonel Juan Valer was killed after being shot seven times while trying to protect Tudela (who was seriously injured as well) and Captain Raúl Jimenez was killed by a grenade thrown by the same rebel who killed Valer and injured Tudela. Supreme Court Justice Dr. Carlos Giusti Acuña was shot in the leg and died of his wounds.

== Legal actions ==
In 2000, the relatives of the aforementioned terrorists filed a criminal complaint with the Public Prosecutor's Office, alleging that their relatives were extrajudicially executed. In 2002, the case was taken up by public prosecutors, but the Peruvian Supreme Court ruled that the military tribunals had jurisdiction. A military court later absolved them of guilt, and the "Chavín de Huántar" soldiers led the 2004 military parade. In response, MRTA family members filed suit in 2003 at the Inter-American Commission on Human Rights (IACHR) accusing the Peruvian state of human rights violations, namely that the MRTA rebels had been denied "right to life, the right to judicial guarantees and the right to judicial protection". The IACHR accepted the case in 2004, deciding in 2015 that the MRTA members (in particular, Eduardo Nicolás Cruz Sánchez) had the right under international humanitarian law to not be summarily executed and that Peru was responsible for violating that right and for delaying investigation into the deaths. However, they did not decide in favor of any compensations to the families; instead ruling that the investigation, some familial rehabilitation, and the IACHR decision was reparation enough.

== Commemoration ==
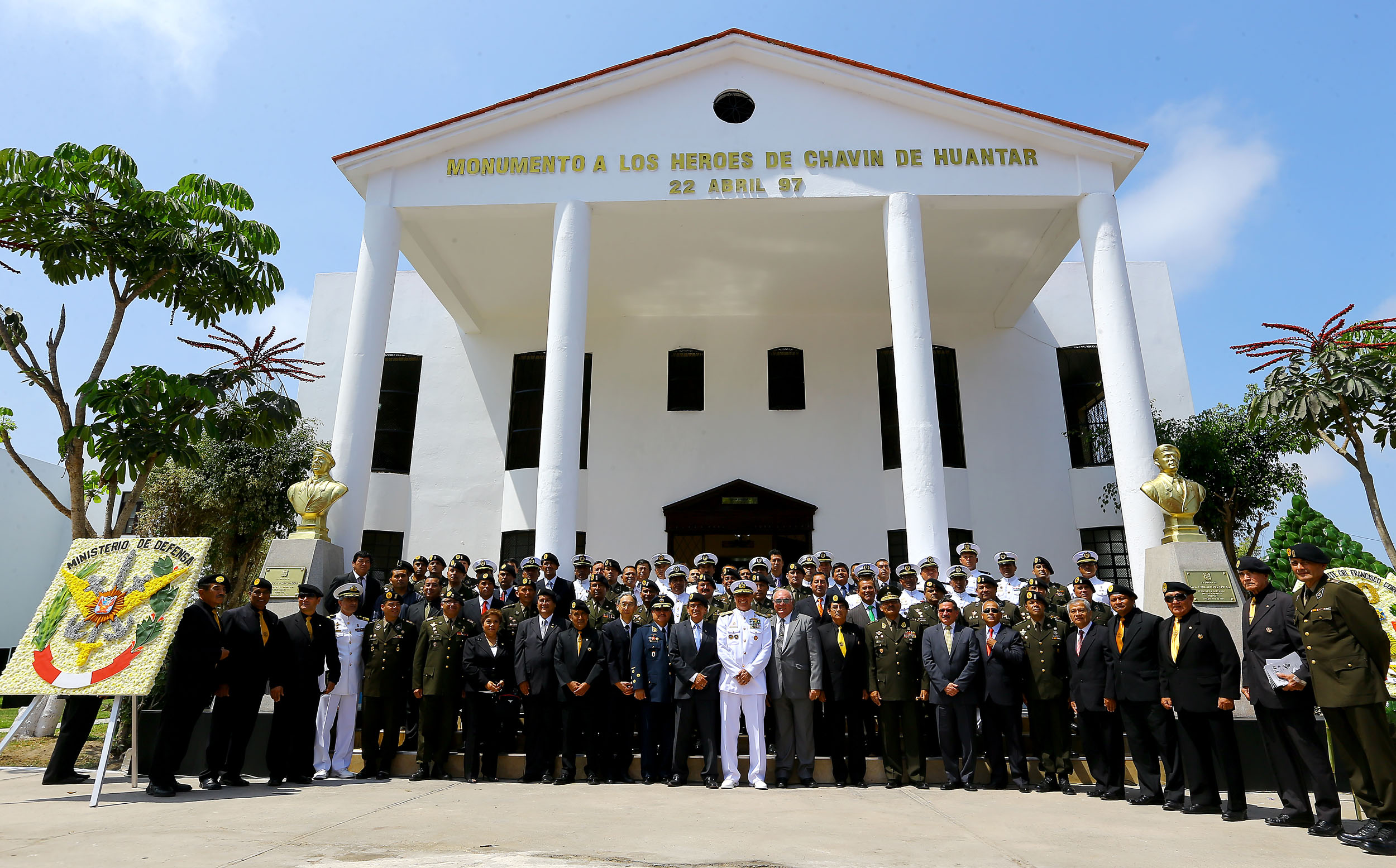
Peruvian Ministry of Defense and military personnel commemorating the operation in 2013.

Alan García, then president of Peru, ruled that every year on April 22, the country would commemorate the day of "military bravery" in honor of the Operation Chavín de Huántar, considered one of the most successful military rescues in a hostage crisis in the world. The government of Ollanta Humala honored the soldiers who took part of the successful operation.

On April 19, 2017, the servicepeople who carried out the operation were awarded the Military Order of Ayacucho, Grand Cross grade, by the Peruvian president Pedro Pablo Kuczynski, according to Supreme Resolution Number 031-2017-DE. On April 21, 2017, Law Number 30554 was enacted by the Peruvian Congress, which proclaimed the Chavín de Huántar commandos "Heroes of Democracy".

== See also ==
- Chavín De Huántar: The Rescue of the Century, a 2025 film inspired by Operation Chavín de Huántar
