= Mladen Mladenov (diplomat) =

Bulgarian diplomat (1921–1996)

Mladen Nikolov Mladenov (Bulgarian: Младен Николов Младенов; Gorna Verenitsa, 1921 — Montana, 1996) was a Bulgarian diplomat. He was the uncle of politician Nickolay Mladenov.

== Career ==
He was born in the village of Gorna Verenitsa, in what was then the Kingdom of Bulgaria. He later graduated from the Higher Party School in Sofia.

During his diplomatic career, he represented the People's Republic of Bulgaria in Peru and Bolivia (1973–1978; accredited to the latter 1975–1979), the Democratic Republic of Afghanistan (1980–1982) and Argentina (1982–1986).

He died in Montana, Bulgaria in 1996.
