= Ronald Gamarra Herrera =

Peruvian politician and lawyer

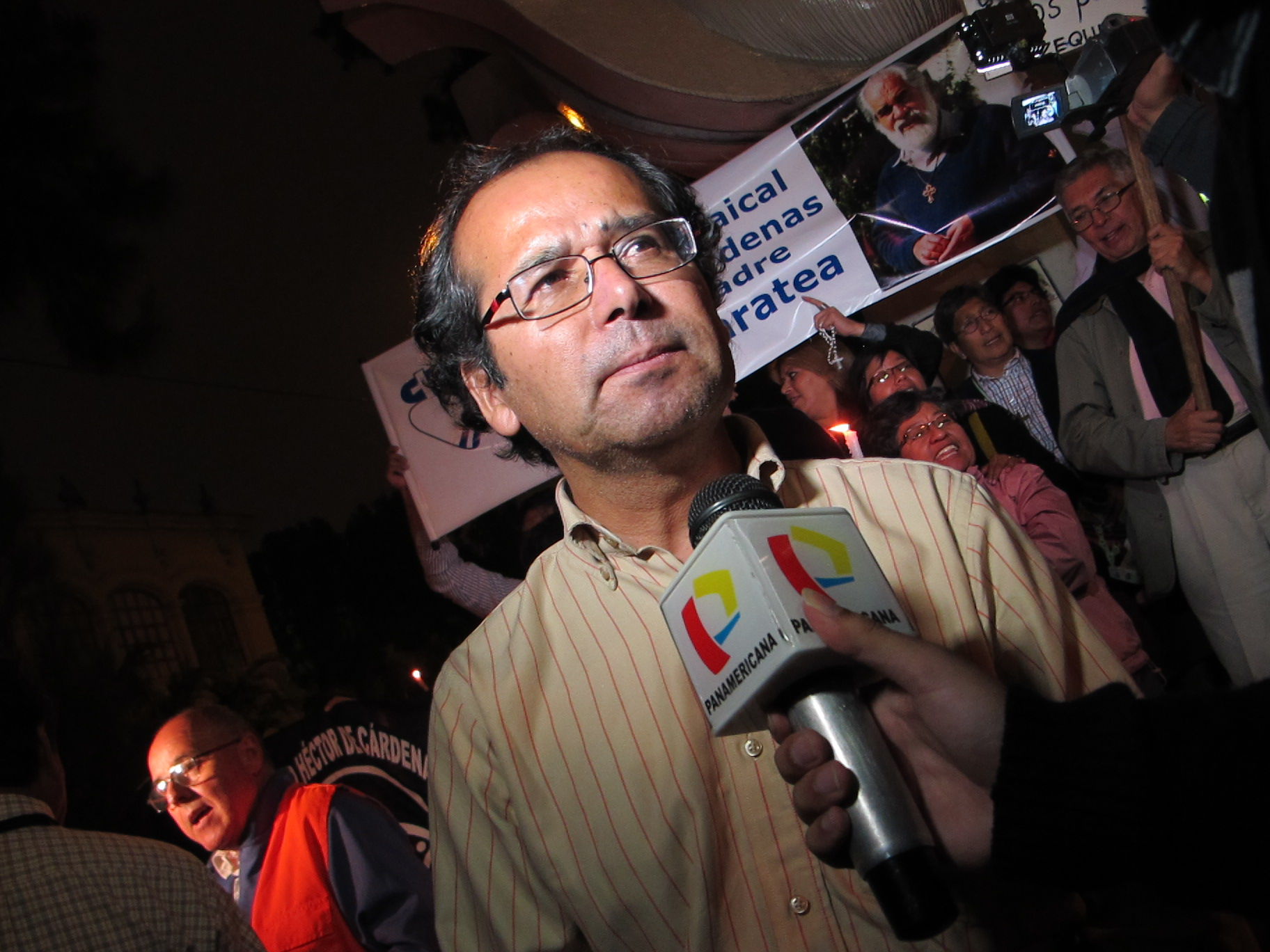

Ronald Álex Gamarra Herrera is a Peruvian politician and lawyer specializing in human rights issues. During 2008 to 2010, Gamarra was Executive Secretary of the Coordinadora Nacional de Derechos Humanos (National Coordinator for Human Rights of Peru) and one of the lawyers representing the civil parties -the families of the Barrios Altos and La Cantuta victims- in the proceedings against former president Alberto Fujimori. Between 2001 and 2004, he served as Ad Hoc Deputy Attorney General for corruption cases and human rights violations attributed to Fujimori and his principal adviser, Vladimiro Montesinos. Gamarra also participated in the process of extraditing the former president back to Peru from Chile. From 1988 to 2000, he directed the Justice Program at the Instituto de Defensa Legal (Legal Defense Institute). Gamarra Herrera writes a weekly column in the Lima daily La República and teaches at Universidad Mayor de San Marcos.
