= Jaime Castillo Petruzzi =

Chilean former militant

Jaime Francisco Sebastián Castillo Petruzzi, known as Torito (Little Bull), is a Chilean former militant of the left-wing organization Movimiento de Izquierda Revolucionaria who worked with the Túpac Amaru Revolutionary Movement during the internal conflict in Peru. He was convicted by a Peruvian military tribunal of high treason in 1993 and sentenced to life in prison. In 2003, after a new trial in accordance with a ruling by the Inter-American Court of Human Rights, Castillo was sentenced to 23 years in prison. He was released on 14 October 2016 and expelled to Chile.

== Associations and joining the MRTA ==
Castillo joined the MIR in the 1960s. After the victory of Salvador Allende, he was employed by the Government, sent to Cuba to train, and eventually became a guard of the Palacio de La Moneda. In 1973, immediately after Augusto Pinochet's coup d'état he fled to Paris to study. In the University of Paris he met fellow students, future MRTA leader Víctor Polay Campos and ex-president of Peru, Alan García. From Paris, he traveled to El Salvador and fought in the civil war there for two years. After this, he went to Nicaragua to aid the government in fighting Contra rebels supported and armed by the CIA (USA). Around 1987, the military failure and numerous inside political differences that plagued the MRTA led Polay to contact Castillo and urge him to go to Peru and join his organization.

Along with a few others, he formed a group of Chilean internationalist fighters who entered the ranks of the Peruvian terrorist group. Castillo was condemned by the Peruvian State for kidnapping prominent businessmen during this period, who were kept in cárceles del pueblo (people's jails) and usually exchanged for money to buy modern weaponry and equipment.

== Trials and convictions ==
He was captured in 1993 after his involvement in a failed kidnapping operation. He allegedly lost his cool and fired his gun in the heat of a fight that broke out during the kidnapping operation of Pedro Miyasato Miyasato, killing businessperson David Ballón Vera and one of his brothers in arms.

After a three-hour trial, Castillo was summarily sentenced to life in prison by a special military court of masked judges for traición a la patria (high-treason). He was imprisoned in the high-security Yanamayo prison in Puno, Peru. In 1999, the Inter-American Court of Human Rights ruled that the trial against Chilean citizens Jaime Francisco Sebastián Castillo Petruzzi, María Concepción Pincheira Sáez, Lautaro Enrique Mellado Saavedra, and Alejandro Luis Astorga Valdez was invalid due to a violation of nine articles of the Inter-American Convention on Human Rights by the Peruvian State. The court ordered the defendants guaranteed a new trial with full observance of due legal process. The Court also ordered the Peruvian State to pay to their families a total sum of US $10,000.00 (ten thousand dollars USA) or its equivalent in Peruvian national currency.

In April 2001, Castillo and five other Chileans imprisoned in Yanamayo began a hunger strike asking to be repatriated to Chile. The following month they were transferred to Lima, and the new Peruvian government (Valentín Paniagua) decided to rejoin the Inter-American Commission for Human Rights and accepted its verdict in the case of Castillo Petruzzi. In June, the life sentence was overturned and a new trial began. In September 2003, Jaime Castillo was sentenced to 23 years in prison and civil damages of 250,000 Soles (Peruvian currency). The two other Chileans were released, one on probation.

However, on October 14, 2009, Castillo and ten other prisoners were taken in the early morning hours to the special closed-regime prison of Ancon I (Piedras Gordas), on the outskirts of Lima. This was a radically different regime from Miguel Castro Castro prison, in Lima, where he had studied communication science, taught French and Italian, and worked as an craftsman. The same day, the government of Alan García enacted a new law eliminating prison benefits.

After a year in Ancon I, Castillo was sent back to Castro Castro. The 29 April 2011 he was attacked along with other political prisoners in Hall 5 by dozens of common criminals, in order to evict them and take control of the pavilion. The medical report says Castillo suffered from multiple bruises, 55 cuts to the head, a ruptured meniscus in his right knee and sharps injuries in the body. Following the incident, he was transferred back to prison Ancon I. After five months is surgery on his right knee and reconstructed ligaments, he was operated on while remaining handcuffed to the bed in the presence of police officers in the operating room, as is a common practice in Peru. He was discharged within 24 hours and sent back to Ancon I. Exercise therapy and recovery prescribed by doctors was 25% fulfilled, because of prison authorities' refusal.

In Ancon I prison he had severe restrictions: he remained locked from 9 pm to 7 am, no TV or radio. The light went off at 10 pm and their access to the yard was reduced to four hours. He was not allowed outside communication.

== Release and return to Chile ==
After three quarters of his sentence was served, in February 2010, advocates for Castillo complained that he could have been released with credit for work and study under extant Peruvian rules. His girlfriend, Maite Palacios, and his father, as well as numerous friends of Castillo in Chile and Peru, argued in favor of this. Instead, Castillo was released after completing his sentence on 14 October 2016. That same day, he was promptly expelled from the country and returned to Chile. After his return, he was asked by La Tercera whether he considered MRTA to be a terrorist organization, to which he responded that calling them terrorists was an insult because they were actually resistance fighters following the "rules of war".

In February 2020, the government of Chile filed suit against Castillo, accusing him of inciting a subversion of the public order.

== See also ==
- Internal conflict in Peru
- Chile-Peru relations
- Nestor Cerpa Cartolini
- Víctor Polay Campos
