= Chorrillos Military School =

Peruvian Army officer education institution

Coordinates: 12.163°S 77.014°W

- Spanish: Escuela Militar de Chorrillos
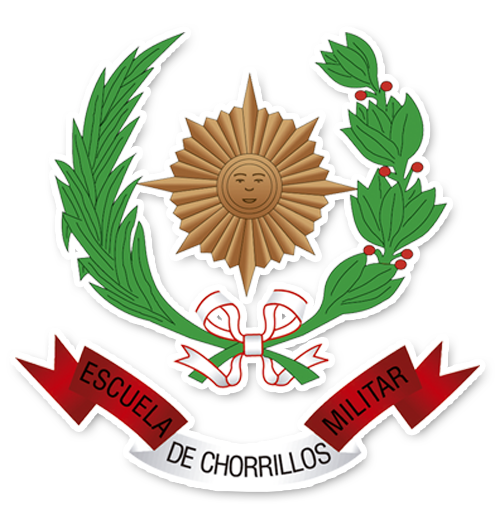
- Motto: Spanish: Disciplina, Moral y Equidad
- Motto in English: Discipline, Moral and Equity
- Type: Military academy
- Established: January 30, 1830; 196 years ago
- President: Brig. Gen. Carlos Alberto Rabanal Calderon
- Location: Av. Escuela Militar S/N, Chorrillos, Lima, Peru
- Website: www.escuelamilitar.edu.pe

The Chorrillos Military School (Spanish: Escuela Militar de Chorrillos) is the institution in charge of the undergraduate education of officers of the Peruvian Army.

== Overview ==
The school was opened in 1830 during the first government of Agustín Gamarra and was relocated to Chorrillos, Lima, Peru, in 1888, hence its name.

As of 2019, its director was Brigade General Carlos Rabanal Calderon.

It was also the alma mater of Manuel Noriega (1962), Vladimiro Montesinos (1966), and Hugo Chávez Frías (1974).

It contains the Escuela de Comandos (Commando School). In 1997, a replica of the Japanese Diplomatic Residency was secretly built there. Tunnels were dug and the rescue plan was practiced again and again until perfect for the Operation Chavin de Huantar that ended the Japanese embassy hostage crisis. As of 2008 it still existed and was considered a monument to those who took part in the rescue, and sometimes still used in training.
