= Néstor Cerpa Cartolini =

Peruvian guerrilla leader (1953–1997)

- Born: 14 August 1953; Lima, Peru
- Died: 22 April 1997 (aged 43); Lima, Peru
- Cause of death: Killed in Operation Chavín de Huántar
- Occupations: Guerrilla, political activist
- Years active: 1970s–1997

Néstor Cerpa Cartolini (14 August 1953 – 22 April 1997) was a member, then leader of the revolutionary group self-named Túpac Amaru Revolutionary Movement (MRTA). He was sometimes known by the nom de guerre "Evaristo". He was killed by Peruvian government forces during the hostage release Operation Chavín de Huántar in 1997.

== Biography ==
=== Early years ===
Cerpa was born in the Lima working class district of La Victoria. As a union leader in the 1970s he was involved in the takeover by workers of the Cromotex textile factory in December 1978, which was violently ended by the military government in February 1979, resulting in the deaths of several workers. Following the release of the survivors in late 1979, Cerpa organized a sit-in at the United Nations communications office in Lima.

=== Terrorism ===
In the early 1980s he became involved with the nascent MRTA and quickly rose to be the leader of the San Martín Zone Committee, and thence to the national leadership of the MRTA. As an MRTA militant he is alleged to have led and/or participated in:

- Takeover of the Lima head offices of El Nacional newspaper, forcing its workers to print an MRTA communiqué.
- Arson at the Plaza Unión, in Lima, on 9 September 1984.
- Putting a terrorism flag by the KFC on Avenida Benavides, Surco, Lima, on 20 March 1985.
- Attempted attack on the office of Sedapal, located in the intersection of Avenida Benavides and La Paz in Miraflores.
- Assault and armed robbery against the San Borja Galleria on 30 March 1985, also in Lima.
- Assault on the Julio C. Tello Technological Institute in Villa el Salvador on 6 May 1985.
- Assault and armed robbery against Electro Perú, Lima, on 25 May 1985.

In late 1985 Cerpa travelled to Colombia, where he headed the "Leoncio Prado" Squad, one of three MRTA squads that participated in a joint terrorist venture with Colombia's M-19 movement and Ecuador's ¡Alfaro Vive, Carajo! and Quintín Lame guerrillas.

After his return to Peru, and following the capture of Victor Polay, Cerpa became the most prominent leader within the MRTA and one of the few publicly known faces within the movement.

Following the April 1992 "self-coup" by Peruvian President Alberto Fujimori, the MRTA suffered heavy losses at the hands of the Peruvian police and military, which coupled with internal problems, had brought the organization to the brink of defeat. In this context, Cerpa and the MRTA leadership looked to a horrifying action to break the MRTA out of its growing isolation.

In December 1996, Cerpa led an MRTA commando squad in seizing the Japanese ambassador's residence in Lima, which started what is now called the Japanese embassy hostage crisis. The MRTA's main demand was for the exchange of the hostages for 465 members of the MRTA in prison, including Cerpa's wife Nancy Gilvonio, the Chilean members of the organization, and U.S. citizen Lori Berenson. The government rejected the demands, and on 22 April 1997, after 126 days, a 140-man team of commandos of the Peruvian Armed Forces stormed the Japanese ambassador's residence to rescue all the hostages. One hostage and two soldiers died in the assault, as did Cerpa along with the rest of the MRTA squad.

On 24 April 1997, Cerpa's body was interred without ceremony in Nueva Esperanza Cemetery, located in the Lima suburb of Villa María del Triunfo.
