= Túpac Amaru Revolutionary Movement =

1982-1997 Marxist–Leninist terrorist group in Peru

Túpac Amaru Revolutionary Movement Movimiento Revolucionario Túpac Amaru
- Leaders: Víctor Polay (POW); Néstor Cerpa Cartolini †
- Dates active: 1982–1997
- Country: Peru
- Ideology: Communism; Marxism–Leninism; Guevarism; Foco theory; Left-wing nationalism; Revolutionary socialism; Indigenismo
- Political position: Far-left
- Status: Delisted as a Foreign Terrorist Organization by the US State Department
- Size: 1,000 (1991)

The Túpac Amaru Revolutionary Movement (Spanish: Movimiento Revolucionario Túpac Amaru, abbreviated MRTA) was a Peruvian Marxist-Leninist guerrilla army which started in the early 1980s. Their self-declared goal was to demonstrate the viability of radical revolution to leftist groups in Peru that sought change through the current government. The MRTA also aimed to provide an alternative to another militant group, the Shining Path, which placed them in direct competition. The group was led by Víctor Polay Campos until he was sentenced to 32 years' imprisonment in 1992 and by Néstor Cerpa Cartolini ("Comrade Evaristo") until his death in 1997.

The MRTA took its name in homage to Túpac Amaru II, an 18th-century rebel leader who was himself named after his claimed ancestor Túpac Amaru, the last indigenous leader of the Inca people. The MRTA was designated as a terrorist organization by the Peruvian government, the US Department of State, and the European Parliament but was later removed from the United States State Department list of Foreign Terrorist Organizations on 8 October 2001.

At the height of its strength, the movement had several hundred active members. Its stated goals were to establish a socialist state and rid the country of all imperialist elements.

== Ideology ==
The ideology of the MRTA is informed by both Peruvian nationalism and Marxism-Leninism. The MRTA takes its name from Sapa Inca Tupac Amaru, the last Inca emperor who led a failed rebellion against the Spanish colonial government and was executed in 1572. One of his descendants, Jose Gabriel Condorcanqui, took the name Tupac Amaru II and led another popular revolt against the Spanish (1780–1782). The MRTA considered itself the vanguard of ideas that already had popular support among oppressed groups, much like the indigenous leader. In their official statements, the MRTA drew a connection to the anti-colonial struggle against the Spanish to the twentieth century, arguing that Peru was still a subordinate economy to the west especially the United States. Despite the inspiration from the past struggles of Indigenous peoples of Peru, MRTA was not founded by Indigenous leaders, it was not an ethnically focused Indigenous organization, and it did not primarily focus on Indigenous rights.

The MRTA argues that globalization is the mechanism of neo-colonialism, even that there is no real difference. The MRTA saw the IMF and World Bank as important instruments of neo-colonialism, and argued that the policies enforced by these organizations on Peru had caused unemployment and stalled development. In their first radio transmission, the MRTA said, "the war which we begin today is a continuation of the open and clandestine war we Peruvians have waged against foreign and internal oppressors (for centuries)." Drawing upon the works of Jose Carlos Mariategui's Seven Interpretive Essays on Peruvian Reality, the MRTA combines an appreciation for Peru's indigenous history with the works of Karl Marx. Peruvian Marxists differ from traditional Marxists in a few ways. Notably, the Peruvian Marxist tradition holds that non-industrial workers could become politically conscious and begin a popular uprising, a notion dismissed by European Marxists in Mariategui's time. Peruvian Marxists are less concerned with achieving the key precursors of traditional Marxist revolutions, and instead focus on the daily experiences of Peruvians. Revolution, they argue, is the only way to improve the conditions of the Peruvian people.

Peruvian Marxists also valorize Indigenous societies for their communal organization, which is seen as a precursor to socialism. Effectively, Peruvian Marxists equate the establishment of a socialist state in Peru with a return of an Indigenous state, which is considered more just and representative of Peruvian peoples and interests.

In order to achieve their vision, the MRTA declared the necessity of forgoing legal reform in favor of violent revolution. Accordingly, the MRTA aimed to escalate preexisting conflicts and create new ones to demonstrate the feasibility of revolution to a critical mass of Peruvians. Conflict would further deteriorate conditions in Peru, hopefully leading to a transition from a pre-revolutionary state to revolutionary state. The MRTA believed that political organization would be important to a successful revolution, but criticized preexisting leftist groups as naive for believing in a peaceful reform movement. "Reformism" in general was considered by the MRTA to have stalled the progress towards global socialist revolution by preventing the rise of class consciousness.

The MRTA simultaneously preached Peruvian nationalism while arguing they were part of a larger Latin American effort to remove North American interference on the continent. The prominence of Peru's Indigenous past in the MRTA's rhetoric meant they never aspired to fully merge with a global movement, only that they wished to aid like-minded allies.

== History ==
=== Origins ===
The MRTA formed between 1980 and 1982 with merging of the Revolutionary Socialist Party (Marxist–Leninist) (PSR-ML) and the militant faction of the Revolutionary Left Movement, MIR El Militante (MIR-EM). The former gathered several ex-members of the Peruvian armed forces that participated in the leftist government of Juan Velasco Alvarado (1968–1975), and the latter represented a subdivision of the Revolutionary Left Movement, a Castroist guerrilla faction which was defeated in 1965. The MRTA attempted to ally with other leftist organizations following the first democratic elections in Peru after a military government period (1968–1980). in the Period of 1982–1984, the MRTA continued to organize its military and political structures internally.

The MRTA maintained an alliance with MIR until 1987.

=== Operations ===
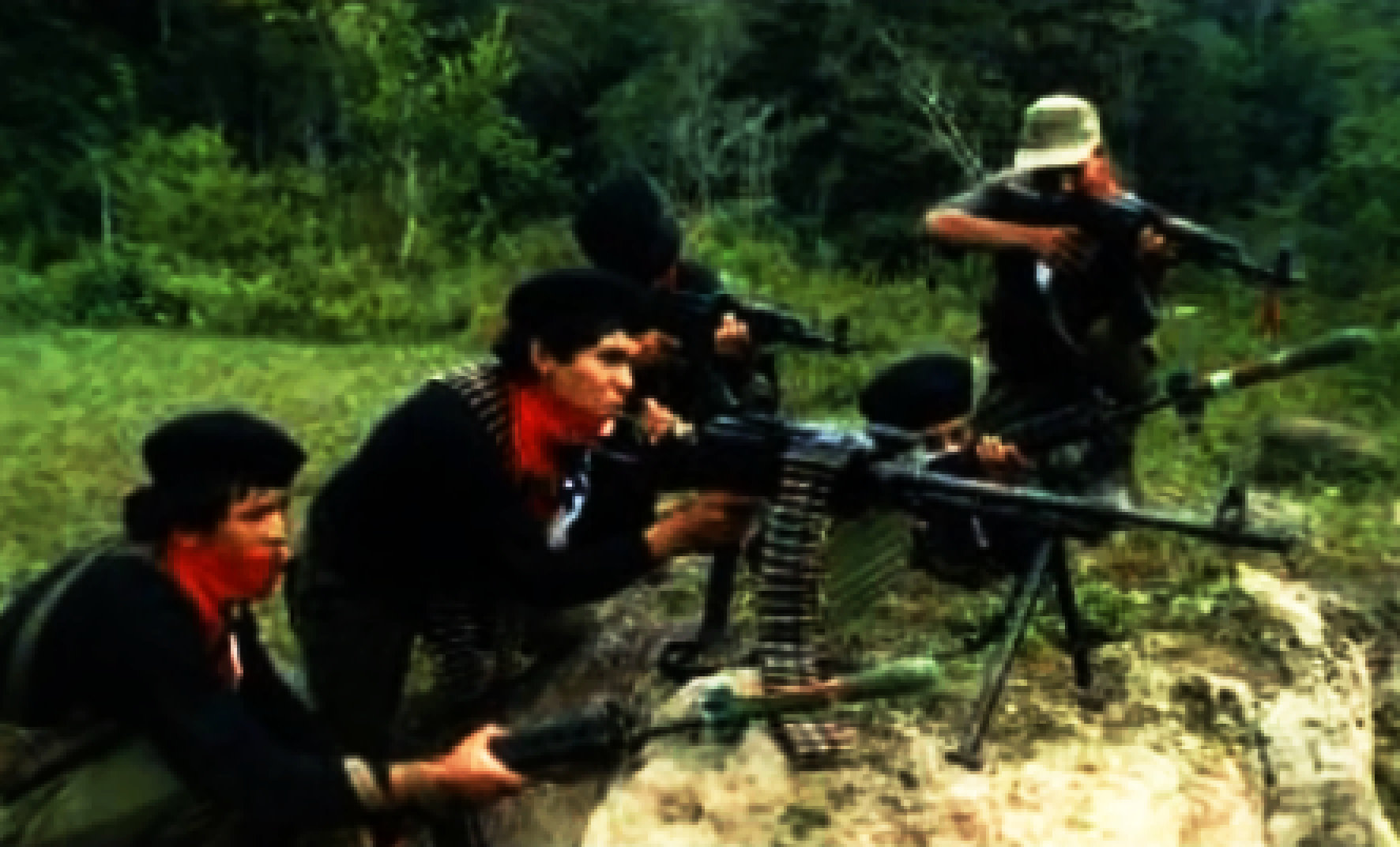
Self-published photo of MRTA guerrillas training

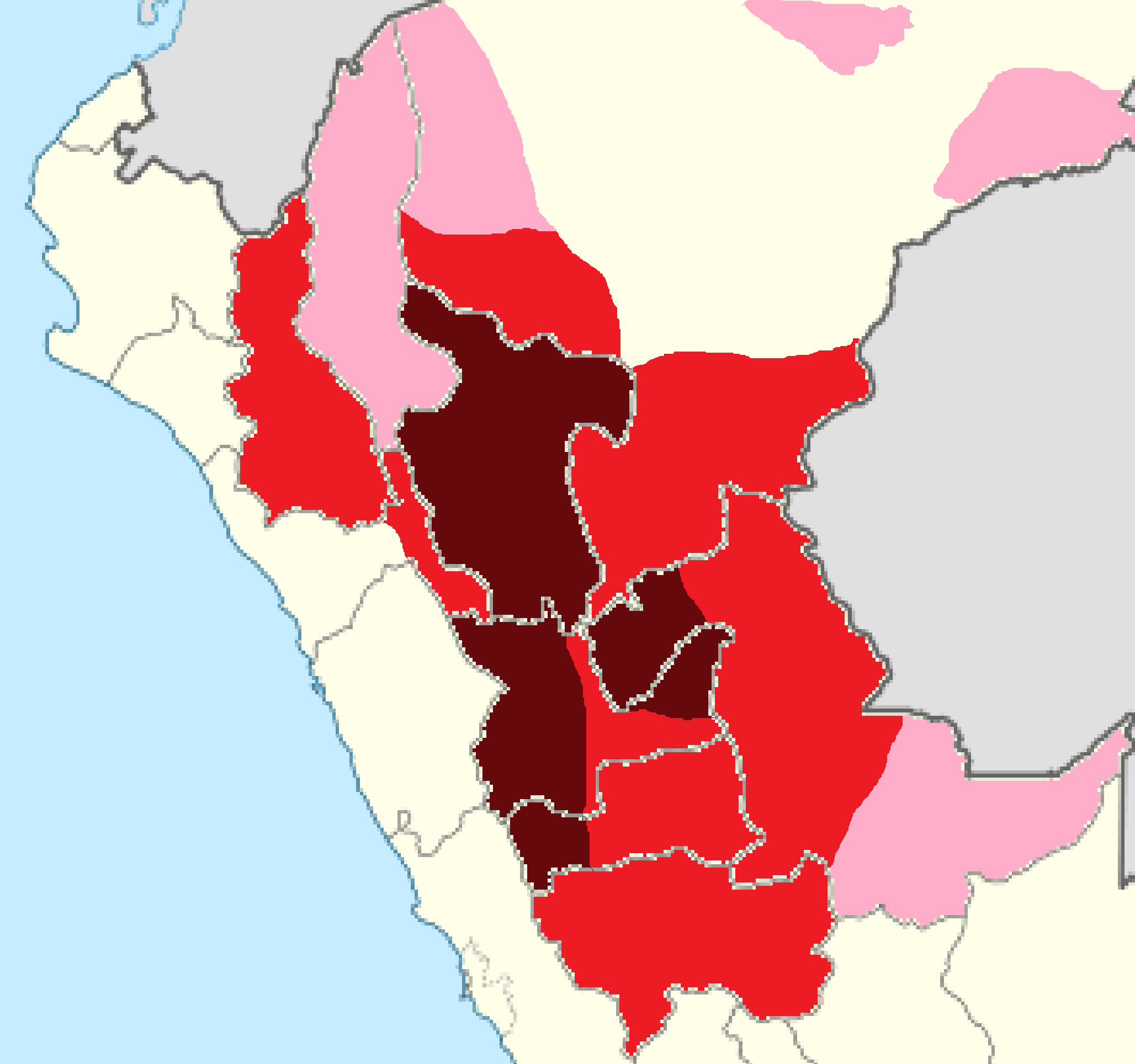
Areas where the MRTA was active

The first action by the MRTA occurred on 31 May 1982, when five of its members, including Victor Polay Campos and Jorge Talledo Feria (members of the Central Committee) robbed a bank in La Victoria, Lima. During the hold up, Talledo was killed by friendly fire.

On the midnight of 28 September 1984, members of the MRTA fired on the United States Embassy, causing damage but no casualties. The MRTA members were disguised as police, and fled after receiving returning fire from Peruvian guards. The MRTA claimed responsibility for the attack in a message sent to the United States embassy. The group was also linked to further attacks to the Embassy premises in late 1985, April 1986 (protesting US' Operation Eldorado Canyon) and in February 1990, as well as to a series of attacks to USIS Binational Centers.

Peru's counterterrorist program diminished the group's ability to carry out guerrilla attacks, and the MRTA suffered from infighting as well as violent clashes with Maoist rival Shining Path, the imprisonment or deaths of senior leaders, and loss of leftist support. The MRTA's attempt to expand in to rural areas put them in conflict with the Shining Path, where they failed to compete with the more radical group. Shining Path's strength in the countryside forced the MRTA to largely remain in their urban and middle-class base.

On 6 July 1992, MRTA fighters staged a raid on the town of Jaen, Peru, a jungle town located in the northern department of Cajamarca. Two policemen including, Eladio Garcia Tello, responded to the calls for help. After an intense shootout, the guerrillas were driven out of the town. Eladio Garcia Tello perished, after a bullet to the chest.

MRTA's last major action resulted in the 1997 Japanese embassy hostage crisis. In December 1996, 14 MRTA members occupied the Japanese Ambassador's residence in Lima, holding 72 hostages for more than four months. Under orders from then-President Alberto Fujimori, armed forces stormed the residence in April 1997, rescuing all but one of the remaining hostages and killing all 14 MRTA militants. Fujimori was publicly acclaimed for the decisive action, but the affair was later tainted by subsequent revelations that at least three, and perhaps as many as eight, of the MRTistas were summarily executed after they surrendered. The Japanese embassy hostage crisis marked the end of MRTA as any threat to the Peruvian state and effectively dissolved the group.

In 2001, several MRTA members remained imprisoned in Bolivia.

=== Trials and convictions ===
In September 2003, four Chilean defendants, including Jaime Castillo Petruzzi, were retried and convicted of membership in the Túpac Amaru Revolutionary Movement and participation in an attack on the Peruvian North American Cultural Institute and a kidnapping-murder in 1993.

On 22 March 2006, Víctor Polay, the guerrilla leader of the MRTA, was found guilty by a Peruvian court on nearly 30 crimes committed during the late 1980s and early 1990s.

In a case that attracted international attention, Lori Berenson, a former MIT student and U.S. socialist activist living in Lima, was arrested on 30 November 1995, by the police and accused of collaborating with the MRTA. She was subsequently sentenced by a military court to life imprisonment (later reduced to 20 years by a civilian court).

=== Truth and Reconciliation Commission ===
Peru's Truth and Reconciliation Commission determined that the group was responsible for 1.5% of the deaths investigated. In its final findings published in 2003, the Commission observed:

Unlike Shining Path, and like other armed Latin American organizations with which it maintained ties, the MRTA claimed responsibility for its actions, its members used uniforms or other identifiers to differentiate themselves from the civilian population, it abstained from attacking the unarmed population and at some points showed signs of being open to peace negotiations. Nevertheless, MRTA also engaged in criminal acts; it resorted to assassinations, such as in the case of General Enrique López Albújar, the taking of hostages and the systematic practice of kidnapping, all crimes that violate not only personal liberty but the international humanitarian law that the MRTA claimed to respect.

The Truth and Reconciliation Commission goes on to note one of the MRTA's goals was to legitimize politically motivated violence in Peru. The Truth and Reconciliation Commission both condemns this justification of violence, and argues it contributed to the ability of other organizations to inflict greater violence then they might have otherwise. Further, the existence of groups like MRTA, the Truth and Reconciliation Commission argues, legitimized the authoritarian, militaristic, and repressive policies of the government of Alberto Fujimori.

== People's Democratic Front ==
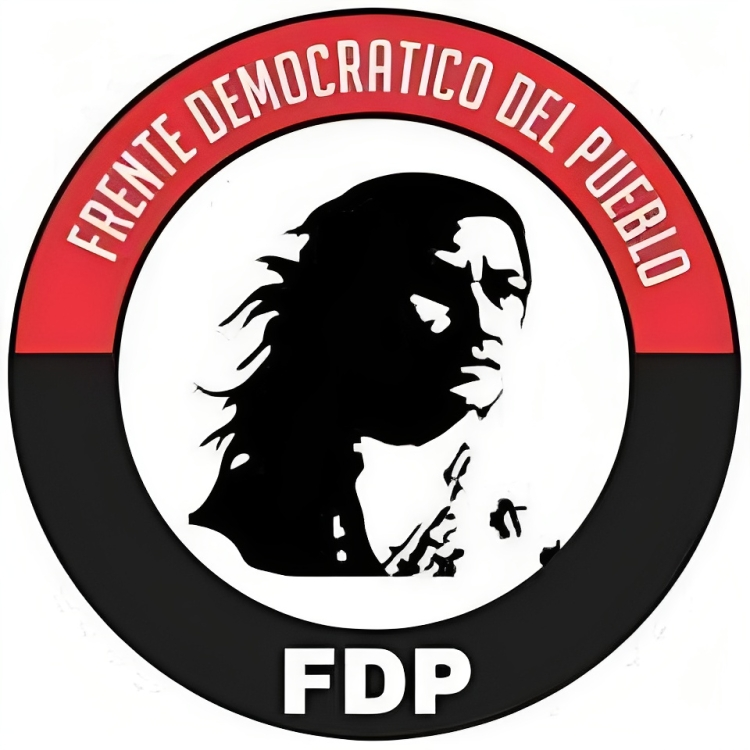
Logo used by the FDP.

The People's Democratic Front (Spanish: Frente Democrático del Pueblo, FDP) is a far-left political organisation formed by former members of the group, as well as sympathisers. It is headed by Luis Gordon Iglesias (convicted of terrorism in 1991 and sentenced to 20 years), Bernardo Roque (coordinator of Revista Túpac Amaru), and Gabriel Vásquez. Its members follow Marxism–Leninism, also showing admiration for Che Guevara's ideology and Túpac Amaru's figure.

The FDP has claimed responsibility for the actions and figures of the MRTA. On 17 December 2016, the FDP, together with the Chilean Guevarist Left collective, paid tribute to the militants who died during Operation Chavín de Huántar. On 24 April 2017, the FDP paid tribute to Néstor Cerpa Cartolini. During the 2021 presidential elections, the FDP announced its support for Pedro Castillo's candidacy.

== Notable people ==
- Peter Cárdenas Schulte (born 1955), Peruvian terrorist and former convict, co-founder and the second-in-command of the Túpac Amaru Revolutionary Movement (MRTA)

== See also ==
- Revolutionary Left Movement
- List of military units named after people
