= Escola Alegria de Saber =

- Japanese: エスコーラ・アレグリア・デ・サベール

Information
- Established: 1995; 31 years ago
- Head teacher: Tomu Kurahashi
- Enrollment: 2000 (2015)

Escola Alegria de Saber (エスコーラ・アレグリア・デ・サベール, Esukōra Areguria de Sabēru; EAS) is a network of Brazilian international schools in Japan. It has campuses in Aichi, Gunma, Mie, and Shizuoka prefectures. The campuses, which have about 2,000 students as of 2015, serve the ensino fundamental (primary through lower secondary) and ensino médio (upper secondary or senior high school/sixth form college) levels.

As of 2015 Tomu Kurahashi is the head of EAS.

The school system began in 1995.

== Campuses ==
Aichi Prefecture

- EAS Hekinan - Unit IV
- EAS Toyohashi - Unit VI
- EAS Toyota - Unit I

Shizuoka Prefecture

- EAS Hamamatsu: Chūō-ku, Hamamatsu - Unit V

Mie Prefecture

- EAS Suzuka - Unit II

Gunma Prefecture

- Unidade Colegio EAS Rede Pitágoras in Ota

Previously there were two campuses in Toyohashi: Toyohashi I and Toyohashi II.

== See also ==
- Brazilians in Japan
- Hamamatsu Municipal Senior High School - Japanese municipal high school with a large non-Japanese enrollment

Japanese international schools in Brazil:

- Escola Japonesa de São Paulo
- Associação Civil de Divulgação Cultural e Educacional Japonesa do Rio de Janeiro
- Escola Japonesa de Manaus
