= Elementary schools in Japan =

Primary education in Japan

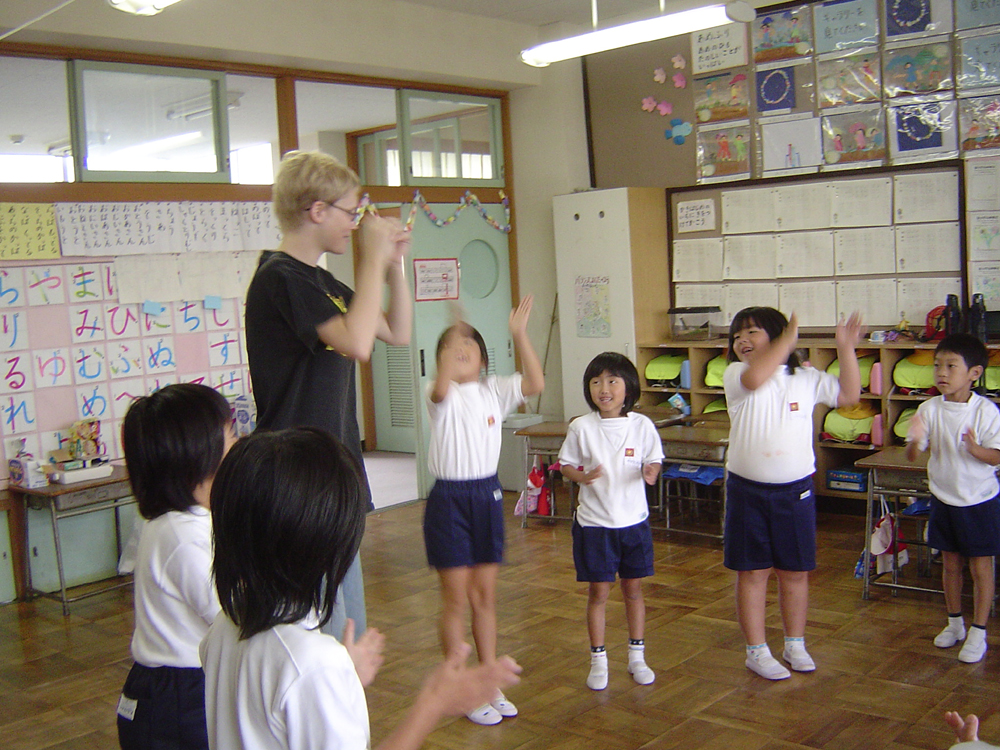
An elementary school class in Japan

In Japan, elementary schools (小学校, Shōgakkō) are compulsory to all children that begin first grade in the April after they turn six. Although not mandatory, kindergarten is growing increasingly popular, as starting school is considered an important event in a child's life. Elementary schools have a six-year curriculum. Together with junior high schools they constitute nine years of compulsory education.

== History ==
In the Edo period, some children attended terakoya or temple schools where they learned practical methods of reading, writing, and calculation.

In 1886, the modern elementary school system started as compulsory education. Until 1947, only elementary schools were compulsory. Immediately before and during World War II, state education was used as a propaganda tool by the Japanese fascist government.

Today, virtually all elementary education takes place in public schools. Tuition to these schools is free, although families have to pay for school lunches, supplies, and non-school expenses, such as extra books or lessons.

Less than 1% of the schools are private, partly because of the latter's expense. Some private elementary schools are prestigious, and they serve as a first step to higher-level private schools with which they are affiliated and thence to a university. Competition to enter some of these "ladder schools" is quite intense.

Elementary school classes are large, typically between thirty and forty students each. Students are usually organized into small work groups, which have both academic and disciplinary functions.

== Course of Study ==
The ministry's Course of Study for Elementary Schools is composed of a wide variety of subjects both academic and nonacademic.

Academic subjects include Japanese language, social studies, arithmetic, and science. Japanese language is an emphasized subject due to the complexity of the written language and the diversity of its spoken forms in formal speech to seniors (keigo). The English language is taught at some schools especially in the higher grades; it is now mandatory at 5th and 6th grade from 2011. As of 2002, TOEFL scores in Japan were the worst in Asia after North Korea.

Nonacademic subjects taught include art (including Japanese calligraphy) and handicrafts, music, haiku or Japanese traditional poetry, homemaking, physical education, and moral education. Children also take part in "special activities," scheduled time each week to take care of class business, plan for field trips and ceremonies, and similar tasks. "Special activities" also serve as an arena for students to take an active role as members of the school community and to cultivate a sense of responsibility and willingness to work together. This is linked back to moral education classtime lessons, which are used as a context for "reflection on desirable practice, particularly in reference to special activities" and through which students can learn how to consider other peoples' perspectives and cultivate a sense of "omoiyari" (consideration of others).

"Information technology is increasingly being used to enhance education, and most schools have access to the Internet." There is a system of educational television and radio, and almost all elementary schools use programs prepared by the School Education Division of Japan's ex Broadcasting Corporation (Nippon Hoso Kyokai—NHK).

== Daily life ==
Both Japanese elementary and middle schools begin around 7:50 am, with lessons starting at 8:30 am. Japanese schools do not have school buses, both because of the small size of most school districts and because of the availability of public transportation.

The first fifteen minutes of each day is set aside for either a schoolwide assembly (on Monday mornings) or attendance and announcements in homeroom.

Classes are between 40 and 45 minutes each, with a break of 5 to 10 minutes in-between.

=== Lunch ===
After four morning classes, at about 12:30 pm, students are sent to pick up their homeroom's lunches from the school kitchens. Lunches are typically served in bento boxes, with small portions of a variety of freshly prepared foods.

These include "a whole range of meats, fishes, vegetables, and sea plants. A typical meal consists of stew or curry, boiled vegetables, a sandwich, and salad. Milk is served with each meal. Usually, there is also dessert, such as gelatin, ice cream, and fruit."

Because there are relatively few cafeterias in elementary schools, meals are taken in the classroom with the teacher, providing another informal opportunity for teaching nutrition, health, good eating habits and social behavior. All students eat the same lunch, and are assigned to shifts for serving lunch to their homeroom. Lunch lasts about 40 minutes.

=== Afternoons ===
In some lower elementary schools, classes are over after lunch and children are allowed to go home. Upper elementary students in those schools have one more class after lunch. However, other schools have a five or six classes per day, with only the youngest students not having a sixth period. Some schools allow for a 20-minute recess in-between, which is sometimes used for cleaning the classrooms: sweeping, mopping, throwing away trash, etc. Students then usually leave school around three o'clock.

After-school clubs like sports and English club are offered at elementary schools, but unlike middle and high school clubs these usually meet only once a week.

== Problems ==
Japanese elementary schooling is seen as effective, but not without some problems, notably increasing absenteeism and school refusal and a troublesome amount of bullying (77,630 reported cases in 2010 throughout the school system) In addition, special provision for the young children returning to Japan from long periods spent overseas is an issue. The government also is concerned with the education of Japanese children residing abroad. However, in most urban centers there are at least private international schools which can accommodate such returnees.

=== Controversies ===
A new course of study was established in 1989, partly as a result of the education reform movement of the 1980s and partly because of ongoing curriculum review. Important changes scheduled were an increased number of hours devoted to Japanese language, the replacement of the social sciences course with a daily life course — instruction for children on proper interaction with the society and environment around them — and an increased emphasis on moral education. New emphasis also was to be given in the curriculum to the national flag and the Japanese national anthem. The ministry suggested that the flag be flown and the national anthem sung at important school ceremonies. Because neither the flag nor the anthem had been legally designated as national symbols, and because of the nationalistic wartime associations the two had in the minds of some citizens, this suggestion was greeted with opposition.

== See also ==
- Sports day
- Fushūgaku
- Juku
- Terakoya
- Education in Japan
- History of education in Japan
- Education in the Empire of Japan
- Triangular eating
