= Mundo de Alegría =

- 学校法人 ムンド・デ・アレグリア

Location
- 9611-1 Ubumi, Yūtō-chō, Chūō-ku; Hamamatsu, Shizuoka Prefecture, 431-0102; 34.6944°N 137.6307°E

Information
- Established: 2003
- Website: www.mundodealegria.org

C.E.P. Mundo de Alegría (学校法人 ムンド・デ・アレグリア, Gakkō Hōjin Mundo de Areguria) is a Peruvian international school (ペルー学校) in Chūō-ku, Hamamatsu, Japan. The school, which has primary and secondary levels, uses Spanish as the medium of instruction. In 2013 the Embassy of Peru celebrated the school's 10 year anniversary. It was established on February 2003.

The school also has a Brazilian primary school section.

== See also ==
- Peruvian migration to Japan
- Brazilians in Japan
- Hamamatsu Municipal Senior High School - Japanese municipal high school with a large non-Japanese enrollment
- Colegio Hispano Americano de Gunma - Peruvian international school in Isesaki, Gunma
- Asociación Academia de Cultura Japonesa (Japanese international school in Lima, Peru)

Japanese international schools in Brazil:

- Escola Japonesa de São Paulo
- Associação Civil de Divulgação Cultural e Educacional Japonesa do Rio de Janeiro
- Escola Japonesa de Manaus
