= Pseudophobia =

- Specialty: Psychology

A pseudophobia is a purported irrational aversion or fear whose existence is as yet unproven.

Examples of pseudophobia include schoolphobia and separation anxiety. The term has also been applied to first time fathers and mothers who have an exorbitant fear of hurting their own infant child due to an exaggerated perception of their fragility. John Bowlby has described the agoraphobic condition as a pseudophobia. These features may in actuality encompass a reaction to a lack of a secure refuge or other underlying pathological processes. Its origin typically derives from some dreaded memory.
