= Instituto Educacional Centro Nippo Brasileiro =

- 日伯学園

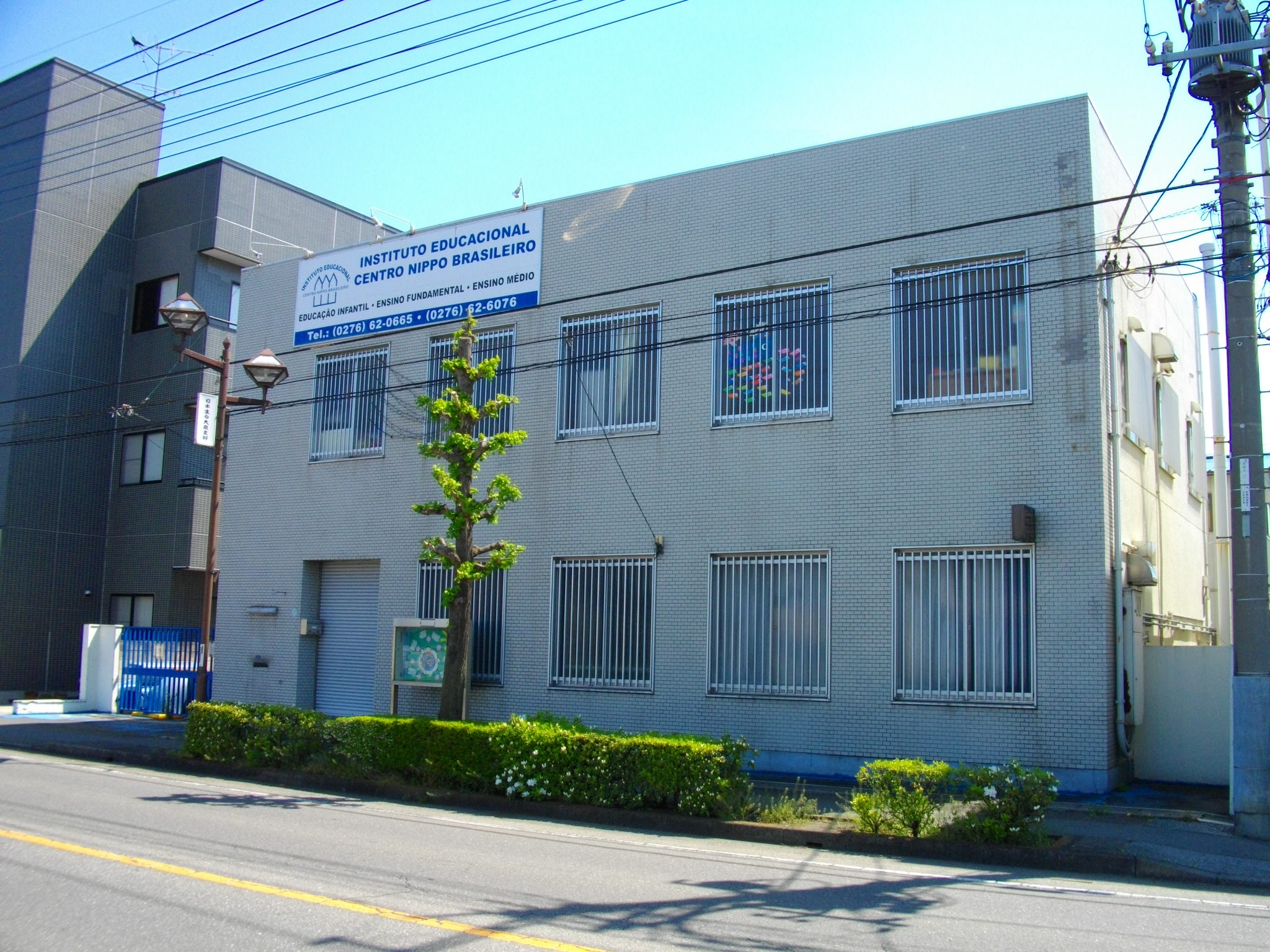
- Instituto Educacional Centro Nippo Brasileiro (2010)

Location
- 1-12-17 Nishi-Koizumi; Ōizumi, Gunma Prefecture, 370-0517; Japan

Information
- Type: Brazilian School
- Established: 1996
- Closed: 2023
- Director: Midori Inoue
- Grades: Kindergarten - 12th grade
- Enrollment: 185 students (2008)
- Accreditation: Accredited by the Brazilian government

Instituto Educacional Centro Nippo Brasileiro (日伯学園, Nippaku Gakuen; literally "Japanese Brazilian Center Educational Institute") was a Brazilian school in Oizumi, Gunma which served kindergarten through 12th grade.

It was accredited by the Brazilian government. As of 2019 the center's director was Midori Inoue.

In 2008 the school had 185 students. In 2007, 45 students who had dropped out of Japanese public schools began attending Nippaku Gakuen.

The school closed in January 2023 due to financial difficulties.

== See also ==
- List of Brazilian schools in Japan

Japanese schools in Brazil:

- Escola Japonesa de São Paulo
- Associação Civil de Divulgação Cultural e Educacional Japonesa do Rio de Janeiro
- Escola Japonesa de Manaus
