= Language minority students in Japanese classrooms =

Minority (non-Japanese) students can be found throughout the entire Japanese education system. An incomplete list of possible cultural and or language minorities represented in Japanese schools include:

- other Asians, particularly Koreans, Chinese, Filipinos, Indonesians, Nepalis, Thais, Mongolians and Vietnamese
- Europeans
- North Americans
- Latin American, particularly Brazilian and Peruvian
- Returnee children
- bicultural children whose parents are from separate cultures and/or who speak separate languages
- Ryukyuan people
- Ainu people

Okinawans and Ainu are considered to be speakers of Japanese, and as a result are not considered language minorities. Descendants of Koreans and Chinese who have lived in Japan for many generations also speak Japanese as their first language. However, other non-Japanese-speaking children, such as the children of Japanese World War II orphans raised in China, who have been returning to Japan in the past decades, have introduced an element of language minorities to schools in Japan since the late 1970s.

== Policy ==
=== Obligations ===
The International Convention on the Protection of the Rights of All Migrant Workers and Members of Their Families from the 69th plenary meeting of the United Nations in 1990 states the following:

- State of employment shall pursue a policy ... aimed at facilitating the integration of children of migrant workers in the local school system, particularly in respect of teaching them the local language.
- States of employment shall endeavor to facilitate for the children of migrant workers the teaching of their mother tongue and culture.
- States of employment may provide special schemes of education in the mother tongue of children of migrant workers.

=== Reality ===
Despite the presence of large numbers of non-Japanese or non-Japanese speaking students in the Japanese school system, the education system is designed to teach all students equally, despite their abilities, in what is known as the assimilationist model.

Education in Japan is compulsory for Japanese students up through the ninth grade. All children of Japanese parents automatically receive notification when they are about to begin school. However, for children of foreigners living in Japan, only those children whose parents have informed the local town office that they want their children to be enrolled in school receive a notification. As a result, the onus for educating language minorities in Japan falls on the local school or school board and not the Ministry of Education, Culture, Sports, Science and Technology (MEXT).

A 1996 MEXT study group decided: "there is no need for [language minorities'] native language education" (Vaipae, p. 199 in Noguchi and Santos).

== Students ==
=== Numbers ===
Noguchi (in Noguchi and Fotos) wrote that the number of language minority students in Japanese schools "surpassed 17,000 in 1998" (p. 15). Of these students, the majority speak Portuguese, Chinese, Spanish, Tagalog, Korean, Vietnamese or English (in descending order). According to a MEXT survey that Vaipae studied, 39 other languages are represented in Japanese public schools (p. 187). Most of these students are concentrated in industrial centers and urban areas; however, all prefectures had language minority students. Akita had the lowest number of these students, while Gunma had the highest concentration.

=== Needs ===
The language needs of these children vary from student to student, and are dependent on a number of factors, including: length of stay in Japan; contact with Japanese prior to, during and after school; their parents' own ideas about the Japanese language and Japanese schooling; and services available to them in their first language (L1) and in Japanese - the second language (L2) - at their schools.

Cummins and Swain (1986) argued that by not allowing for L1 support in the L2 environment of a minority-language-student will significantly affect the student's linguistic, cognitive, social and psychological development.

In the Cummins & Swain model, bilingualism within each bilingual child must be seen as complementary languages. Providing support to the L1 will allow for cognitive transfer to the L2. (In immersion programs, the opposite has also been shown: as those majority-language students are together learning in their L2, the L1 also improves significantly.)

Yet, for minority language students in an L2 classroom situation, learning in an L2 does not imply that knowledge transfer will occur. It is possible that instead of having bilinguals or monolinguals, schools could produce half-linguals - half-literate in one or two languages. Early research by Cummins (1979) has shown that an ability to use the L2 in the playground does not imply that the student has the academic language to perform in the classroom. A distinction between Basic Interpersonal Communicative Skills (BICS) and Cognitive Academic Language Proficiency (CALP) needs to be made therefore by educators and administrators to assist minority language students in the classroom.

Furthermore, Japanese children learn a writing system that involves both phonetic syllabaries (hiragana and katakana) and a pictographic writing system (kanji). Minority students who enter Japanese schools are starting with a large deficit in reading skills. The student must catch up and then keep up without the prerequisite knowledge-base of the spoken language.

Cook (1999) writes: "[t]he moral for teaching is to make the L2 non-threatening and to allow the learner to persevere long enough to feel the benefits." However, Cummins (cited in Fujita, p. 17) writes: "[s]chools reflect the societal power structure by eradicating minority students' language and identity and then attributing their school failure to inherent deficiencies."

=== Goals ===
Fujita (2002) argues there is no goal to maintain the L2 in "returnee" children because Japan as yet has no clear "consensus as to the purpose of learning English in Japan [...] Returnees were once thought to be able to trigger a change in monolithic Japanese educational system by introducing diversity however it seems that this has not happened." (Fujita, p. 19)

Since there is no goal for maintaining either the L2 of returnee children nor the L1 of minority language students, with the exceptions of a few schools, immersion (or bilingualism) is not a Japanese educational reality. However, for the majority of minority language students in Japan, submersion is more appropriate (see Language immersion for more information on submersion in the classroom).

With much linguistic support from society, school, and the family, returnee children are able to at least make the transition to the L1 (Japanese) channel, with various shades of ease and difficulty. For non-Japanese students, the situation is much different.

=== Consequences ===
Noguchi and Fotos (2001) studied bilingualism and bilingual education in Japan in which many authors commented that schools reflect the First language (L1) culture and in doing so have a tendency to minimise minority language students' home language, culture and identity. Decisions to ignore the home culture and language of minority students, or of the Second language (L2) of returnee children, create a number of problems within the language minority student related to self, including cognitive development and language proficiency. (See also Richard, 2001.)

Vaipae discusses an American junior high school student who is without any language support from his school. The student was a bilingual (Spanish and English) and biliterate eighth grader when he arrived in Japan. Unfortunately, the school provided no Japanese as a second language instruction. She writes: "[i]ronically, he received a failing grade in English because he could not read the Japanese instructions on the term test. Although his parents had requested that the readings of the Chinese characters be provided in the easily-mastered hiragana syllabary, the [Japanese] English teacher refused to provide this linguistic support, pointing out that it would be unfair to other students if the tests were not identical."

Another struggling minority student in Japan, a Peruvian sixth-grader, tells Vaipae: "[i]n my country I had a good life... everything goes as I like, for instance, soccer, volleyball, swimming, running, talking and studying. I was really good at these things and I also had many friends. Now I am good at nothing."

Hirataka, Koishi, & Kato (in Noguchi and Fotos) studied the children of Brazilian workers in and around Fujisawa in Kanagawa where they lived with their laborer parents. The parents of the children from the study speak L1-Portuguese and have little to no Japanese language ability. The schools that the subjects attend provide very little L1 language support. Portuguese remains the L1 at home, but the students' productive abilities in Portuguese has attrited in varying degrees depending on among other things, age of arrival in Japan and parental support. Japanese is the language of the school and the surrounding community. As a result, children are shifting from Portuguese to Japanese. Communication between parent and child is increasingly difficult.

Cummins & Swain write: "there may be threshold levels of linguistic competence which a bilingual child must attain both in order to avoid cognitive disadvantages and to allow the potentially beneficial aspects of becoming bilingual to influence his cognitive functioning" (p. 18).

Richard (2001) argued that as Japan welcomes unskilled laborers for the menial 3K jobs: kitsui, kitanai and kikenna—in English, Dirty, Dangerous and Demeaning—not to mention the thousands of foreign female sex workers, that Japan also has a legal and moral obligation to welcome those workers' children.

== See also ==
- Education in Japan
- Ethnic issues in Japan
- Demographics of Japan
- Koreans in Japan
- Chinese in Japan
- First language
- Language acquisition
- Language attrition
- Minorities
- Multilingualism
- Second language
- Knowledge divide
