= Brazilian schools =

Brazilian schools may refer to:

- Education in Brazil
- Brazilian schools in Japan
