= Hamamatsu Municipal Senior High School =

School in Hamamatsu, Japan

Coordinates: 34.7164°N 137.7182°E

- Japanese: 浜松市立高等学校

Location
- 1-21-1 Hirosawa, Chūō-ku; Hamamatsu, Shizuoka, 432-8013; Japan

Information
- Established: 1901 (founded); 1948 (established)
- Website: www.city.hamamatsu-szo.ed.jp/ichiritsu-h/

Hamamatsu Municipal Senior High School (浜松市立高等学校, Hamamatsu-shiritsu Kōtōgakkō) is a senior high school in Hamamatsu, Japan, operated by the city government.

Because the city of Hamamatsu has one of the largest non-Japanese populations in the country, 60% of which is composed of expatriates of Brazilian descent, there is a significant enrollment of students who do not speak Japanese as a primary language. Non-Japanese students are placed in special classes.

== See also ==
- Brazilians in Japan
- Language minority students in Japanese classrooms
- Mundo de Alegría - Brazilian and Peruvian international school in Hamamatsu
