= Portuguese in Asia =

Portuguese in Asia may refer to:

- Portuguese colonization in Asia
- Portuguese presence in Asia
- Present Portuguese people who live in Asia
- Luso-Asians
- The Portuguese language in Asia
