= Reserva (brand) =

Brazilian fashion company

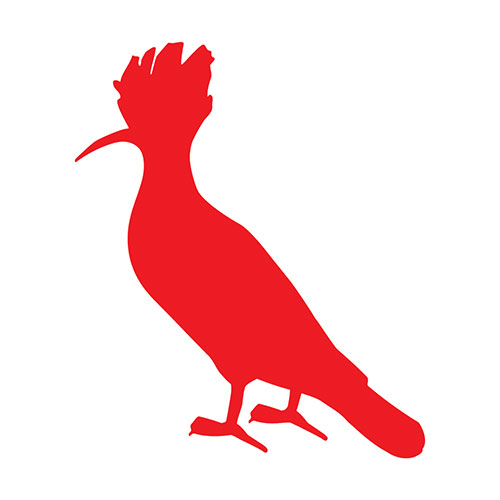
- Company type: Private
- Industry: Clothing
- Founded: 2004
- Headquarters: Rio de Janeiro, Brazil
- Products: Apparel
- Website: https://www.usereserva.com/

Reserva is a Brazilian fashion company specialising in clothing and accessories. The brand is based in Rio de Janeiro and focuses on men's wear. It is currently part of Azzas 2154, the largest fashion company in Latin America, founded in 2024 as a merger between Arezzo&Co and Grupo Soma.
