= List of Brazilian schools in Japan =

This is a list of Brazilian schools in Japan. The Brazilian schools on Japanese soil, aimed at the hundreds of thousands of Brazilians in Japan, number more than 80.

== Gifu Prefecture ==
- Ōgaki
  - Hirogakuen
- Kakamigahara
  - Educacional Nova Etapa
- Minokamo
  - Isaki Nyuton College
- Kani
  - Sociedade Educacional Brazilian School (Gifu)

== Shizuoka Prefecture ==
- Kikugawa
  - Centro de Ensino Nippo-Brasileiro (Colégio Nippo-Objetivo de Kikugawa)
- Hamamatsu
  - Escola Alcance
  - Escola Alegria de Saber Hamamatsu
  - Escola Brasileira de Hamamatsu
  - Escola Cantinho Feliz
  - Mundo de Alegría
- Fuji
  - Escola Fuji

== Aichi Prefecture ==
- Toyohashi
  - Continho Brasileiro (Toyohashi)
  - Escola Alegria de Saber Toyohashi
- Toyota, Aichi
  - Escola Alegria de Saber Toyota
- Hekinan
  - Escola Alegria de Saber Hekinan

== Mie Prefecture ==
- Yokkaichi
  - Escola Nikken (Yokkaichi)
- Suzuka
  - Escola Alegria de Saber Suzuka

== Gunma Prefecture ==
- Ōta, Gunma
  - Colégio Pitágoras Ota
  - Escola Paralelo
- Ōizumi
  - Instituto Educacional Centro Nippo Brasileiro (Nippaku Gakuen; closed in 2023)

== See also ==
- Brazilian schools in Japan
- Brazilians in Japan
- Japanese Brazilian
- Fushūgaku (not attending school)
