= Cognitive academic language proficiency =

Advanced vocabulary

Cognitive academic language proficiency (CALP) is a language-related term developed by Jim Cummins which refers to formal academic learning, as opposed to basic interpersonal communicative skills (BICS). In schools today, the terms BICS and CALP are most frequently used to discuss the language proficiency levels of students who are in the process of acquiring a new language. These students typically develop proficiency in BICS well before they acquire a strong grasp of CALP or academic language. As a result, students may initially appear fully proficient and fluent while still struggling with significant language gaps.

In 1996, ethnographic study of Salvadorean students in Washington, D.C., Carolyn Vincent found that the students' language attainments were "largely deceptive". Students were less proficient than they appeared because they were able "to converse on a few every day, frequently discussed subjects" but often lacked proficiency in academic language. Carolyn Edelsky was an early critic of the BICS/CALP distinction, arguing that academic language is measured inaccurately by relying on "test-wiseness". Cummins countered this by noting that academic language proficiency does not rely "on test scores as support for either its construct validity or relevance to education". Further, it is tempting for teachers and administrators to move students with a high BICS (Basic Interpersonal Communication Skills/Social Language Proficiency) level into a 'mainstream' class because they 'sound' like the other kids on the playground.

== BICS ==
Basic interpersonal communicative skills (BICS) are language skills needed to interact in social situations, for example, when chatting to a friend. BICS refers primarily to context-bound, face-to-face communication, like the language first learned by toddlers and preschoolers, which is used in everyday social interaction. This term is often credited to Jim Cummins' research related to language acquisition and learning.

== CALP ==
CALP refers to the highly abstract, decontextualized communication that takes place in the classroom, especially in the later elementary grades. CALP involves the "language of learning," which enables children to problem-solve, hypothesize, imagine, reason and project into situations with which they have no personal experience. It is a prerequisite for learning to read and write and for overall academic success. The implications of the BICS and CALP concepts for children are that the second language or language of the classroom needs to be sufficiently well-developed for her or him to be able to meet the cognitive demands of the academic setting. Students typically are thought to acquire BICS in 2–3 years, but take 5–7 years to develop the CALP needed to be on the same level with their native speaking counterparts in the classroom.

== Conversational and academic language ==
Although the terms BICS and CALP are still widely used, Cummins has more recently used the terms conversational language and academic language. Instructors in bilingual educational environments, Cummins tells us, should be mindful that a student's apparent ability to interact at a high cognitive level on the 'street' does not necessarily imply the same cognitive or communicational ability in the 'class'. Cummins insists that a more thorough assessment of the student's academic language abilities be performed before moving the student out of a 'sheltered' language development environment.
