= Asociación Academia de Cultura Japonesa (Peru) =

International school in Lima, Peru

- リマ日本人学校

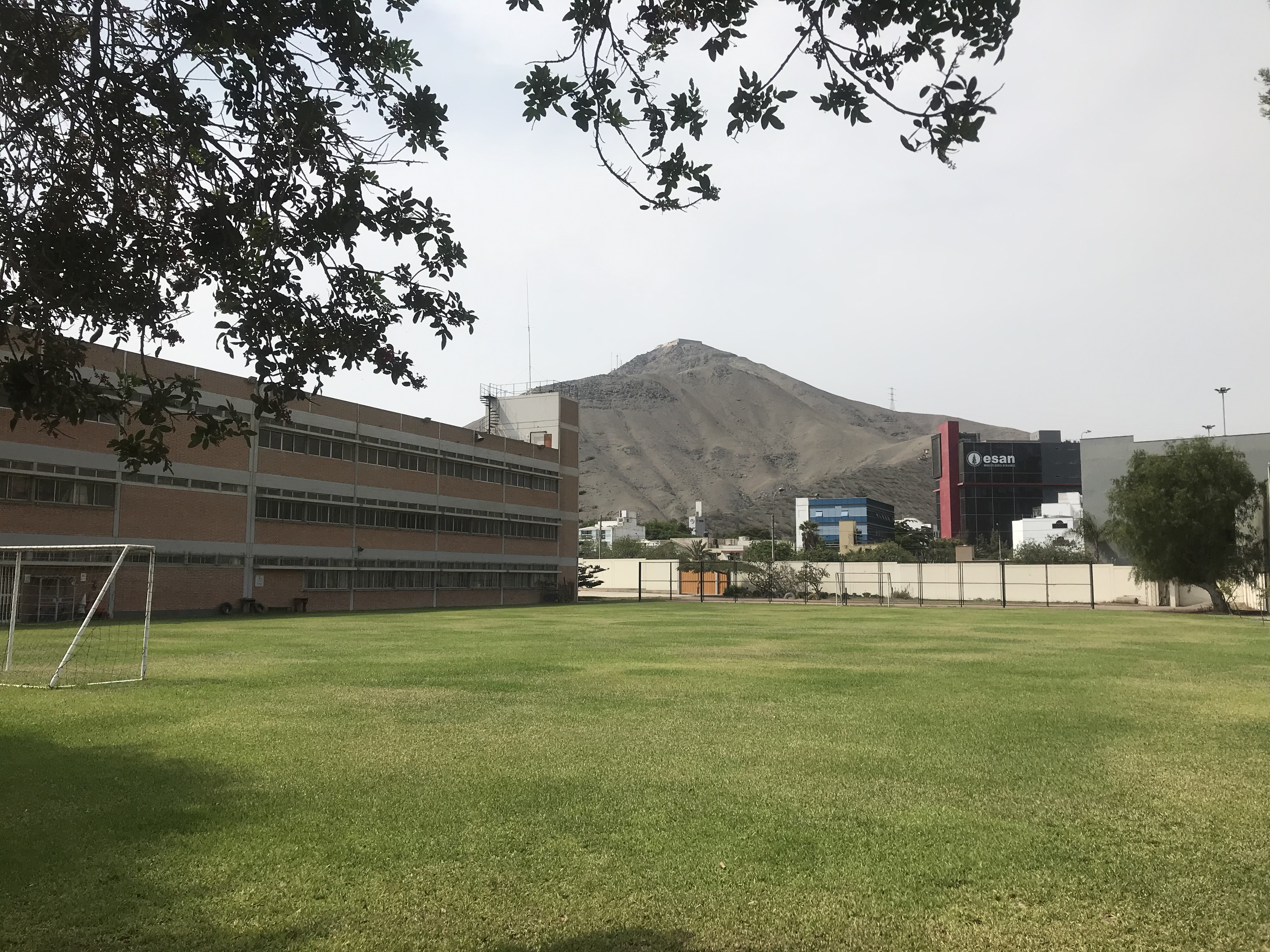
- Lima Japanese School

Location
- Calle Las Clivias 276, Urb. Pampas de Santa Teresa; Santiago de Surco, Lima; 12.10671°S 76.96352°W

Information
- Type: Japanese International School
- Established: 1969
- Website: acjlima.wixsite.com/acjlima-peru

Asociación Academia de Cultura Japonesa (リマ日本人学校, Lima Nihonjin Gakkō) is a Japanese international school in Surco, Lima, Peru. It is under the Asociación Academia de Cultura Japonesa (社団法人日本文化協会, Shadan Hōjin Nippon Bunka Kyōkai), which has the same Spanish name but a different Japanese name. It serves elementary and junior high school levels.

The リマ日本語講習会 opened in 1969. The Instituto Nacional de Cultura of Peru gave approval for the establishment of the day school in June 1971.

== Notable alumni ==
- Toshiki Koike, footballer

== See also ==
- Japanese Peruvian

Peruvian schools in Japan:

- Mundo de Alegría - Hamamatsu
- Colegio Hispano Americano de Gunma - Isesaki, Gunma
