= Colegio Hispano Americano de Gunma =

Peruvian international school in Gunma, Japan

- イスパーノ・アメリカーノ学院

Location
- 10-13 Heiwachō; Isesaki, Gunma Prefecture, 372-0041; Japan

Information
- Established: 1999
- Founder: Luis Angel Gallo Shimabukuro
- Age: 6 months to 18
- Language: Spanish
- Website: Archived school website

Colegio Hispano Americano de Gunma (イスパーノ・アメリカーノ学院, Isupāno Amerikāno Gakuin) is a Peruvian international school (ペルー学校) in Isesaki, Gunma, Japan. A part of the Centro de Desarrollo Hispano Americano, it serves levels six months through preschool, primary school (years 1-6) and secondary school (years 1-5). It was established in 1999.

== See also ==
- Peruvian migration to Japan
- Mundo de Alegría (Peruvian and Brazilian international school in Hamamatsu)
- Asociación Academia de Cultura Japonesa (Japanese international school in Lima, Peru)
