= The School Refusal Assessment Scale-Revised =

- Purpose: evaluate school refusal disorder

The School Refusal Assessment Scale-Revised (SRAS-R), developed by Christopher Kearney and Wendy Silverman, is a psychological assessment tool designed to evaluate school refusal disorder symptoms in children and identify their reasons for avoiding school. This self-report inventory, which is also available in parent response form, consists of 24 questions that measure the frequency with which a child experiences emotions and behaviors related to school attendance. Respondents are asked to answer each of the 24 items on a scale of 0 ("never") to 6 ("always").

The questionnaire takes about 10 minutes to complete and it is designed for use with children ages 5 and up. Several research studies support the SRAS-R as a reliable and valid measure of children's school refusal symptoms.

== Scoring and interpretation ==
Scoring the SRAS-R is based on a 0–6 scale, with each question being scored as follows based on participant response:

- 0 points: 0, meaning "never"
- 1 point: 1, meaning "seldom"
- 2 points: 2, meaning "sometimes"
- 3 points: 3, meaning "half the time"
- 4 points: 4, meaning "usually"
- 5 points: 5, meaning "almost always"
- 6 points: 6, meaning "always"

Each item in the question set contributes to a different function which may be contributing to the child's school refusal behavior. Total scores may be computed by adding the scores of each of four functions on both the parent and child versions. These function scores are each divided by 6 (the number of scores in each set). Parent and child function scores are then summed and divided by 2 to determine the mean function score. The function with the highest mean score is considered the primary cause of the child's school avoidance. The function divisions are as follows:

- Function one ("avoidance of stimuli provoking negative affectivity"): items 1, 5, 9, 13, 17, and 21
- Function two ("escape from aversive social and/or evaluative situations"): items 2, 6, 10, 14, 18, and 22
- Function three ("attention seeking"): items 3, 7, 11, 15, 19, and 23
- Function four ("tangible rewards"): items 4, 8, 12, 16, 20, and 24
