= Japanese School of Manaus =

Escola Japonesa de Manaus
- マナオス日本人学校

Location
- R. Waldemar Jardim Maués, 441 - Aleixo, Manaus - AM, 69083-015, Brazil; Manaus, Amazonas; Brazil; 3.0718126°S 59.982617800000014°W

Information
- Type: Japanese international school
- Website: manausnihon.justhpbs.jp

Japanese School of Manaus (Portuguese: Escola Japonesa de Manaus; Japanese: マナオス日本人学校 Manaosu Nihonjin Gakkō) is a Japanese international school in Manaus, Brazil. The school, which has students between the ages of 6 and 15, has 15 Brazilian Japanese students and 12 Japanese students as of 2013. It was established to educate children of Japanese businesspersons working in the Manaus area.

== See also ==
- Brazilian schools in Japan
  - List of Brazilian schools in Japan
