= Peruvian migration to Japan =

Peruvians in Japan Peruanos en Japón 在日ペルー人 Zainichi Perūjin
Total population
- 49,020 (in December, 2025)

Regions with significant populations
- Greater Tokyo Area, Isesaki, Chūkyō Metropolitan Area (near Nagoya)

Languages
- Japanese and Peruvian Spanish

Related ethnic groups
- Peruvians, Japanese Argentines, Japanese Uruguayans, Japanese Brazilians

There were 49,020 Peruvian residents in Japan in December 2025. The majority of them are descendants of earlier Japanese immigrants to Peru who have repatriated to Japan.

== Migration history ==
In 1990, Japan introduced a new ethnicity-based immigration policy which aimed to encourage Japanese descendants overseas to come to Japan and fill Japan's need for foreign workers. From 1992 to 1997, Japan was the fourteenth-most popular destination for Peruvian emigrants, behind the Netherlands and ahead of Costa Rica.

Among the expatriate communities in Japan, Peruvians accounted for the smallest share of those who returned to their homelands after the global recession began in 2008. In January 2013, a number of Peruvian organizations came together to form the Asociacion de Peruanos en Japon (Association of Peruvians in Japan), dedicated to facilitating integration into Japanese society.

== Media ==
- International Press (newspaper)
- IPC (television station)

== Education ==
There are the following Peruvian international schools (ペルー学校) in Japan:

- Mundo de Alegría - Hamamatsu
- Colegio Hispano Americano de Gunma - Isesaki, Gunma

== See also ==
- Japan–Peru relations
- Migration in Japan
