= Triangular eating =

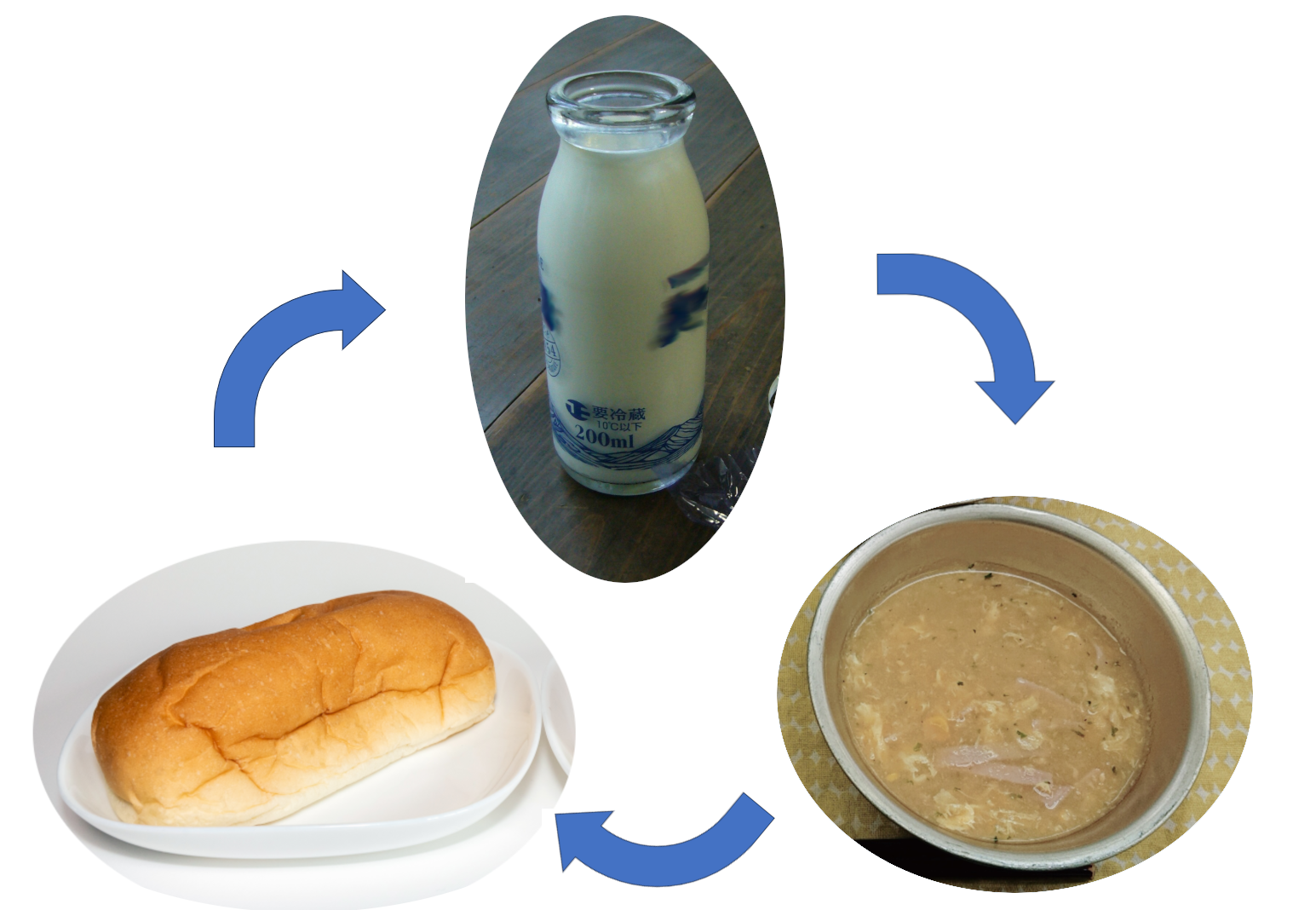
In Japanese elementary schools, there used to be a set rotation of eating each bite.

Triangular eating, Triangle eating (Japanese: sankakutabe, 三角食べ) is a Japanese custom popularized after World War II in which soup, rice, and side dishes are eaten in order. The custom initially started with school lunches, and at that time, the method was to eat bread, milk, and side dishes in order.

In the past, some teachers have been criticized for forcing this method on their pupils. On the other hand, it is recommended to ensure unbiased nutritional intake.

Its antonym is "batch eating."

== Overview ==
Traditionally, the Japanese had the custom of alternating between rice and side dishes, mixing the lightly flavored rice in the mouth to enjoy the complex tastes of the rice. Triangular eating is considered to be a habit with this in mind.

It is said that triangular eating was recommended in some area schools around the 1970s.

Some believe that it is a method of eating milk, bread, and side dishes, in that order, after school lunches began in the 1950s. It is believed that this method was used to encourage Japanese elementary school students, many of whom disliked milk at the time, to drink it. In the 1950s, Japanese elementary school students drank not pure milk but skimmed milk powder dissolved in water for school lunches.

Although this is a relatively recent custom, many of today's Japanese have eaten school lunches as children, and triangular eating is said to be the preferred eating style of many Japanese.

== Advantages ==
If elementary school children are allowed to eat freely, they may eat what they like first and fill up their bellies, resulting in unbalanced nutrition. Triangular eating can prevent this.

Triangular eating also has the meaning of in-mouth seasoning. The idea is that by alternately eating rice, soup, and side dishes, the flavors that remain in the mouth will mingle and make the meal more palatable.

== Criticism ==
Teachers sometimes forced children to eat triangular meals, which was criticized as "too much management" education. Therefore, it is no longer emphasized as an official guideline.

Some children were forced by their teachers to eat triangular meals, causing some children to consider school lunches painful.

Some children do not like the mixing of flavors when eating triangles.

It is also known that many children eat triangular meals but do not have in-mouth seasoning.

It is also theorized that triangular eating can cause elevated blood sugar levels, too much salt, and overeating.

== Response to criticism ==
It is said that the cause of the increase in blood glucose levels with triangular eating is not so much the triangular eating itself, but rather the fact that too much food is put in the mouth at one time or swallowed without chewing.

For this reason, a method of eating a vegetable dish first, followed by a triangular meal, has been suggested.

Some believe that eating a triangular diet will help reduce satiety with smaller portions and moderate the degree of blood glucose increase.

Some studies also suggest that triangular eating, along with the method of eating meat first, is effective in controlling blood glucose levels, while eating vegetables first is less effective.
