= Escola Japonesa de São Paulo =

- サンパウロ日本人学校

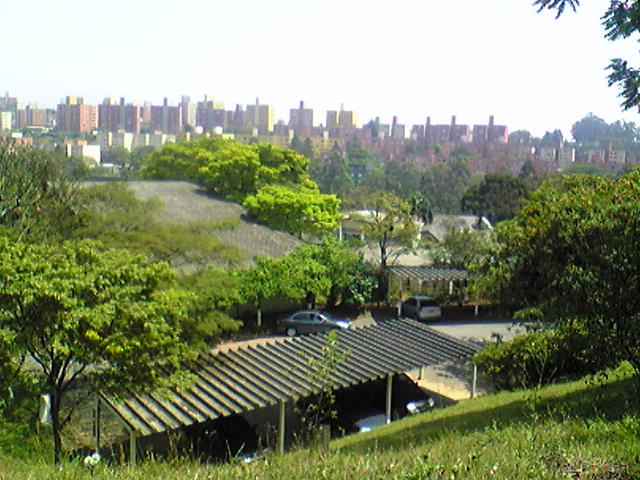

Location
- Estrada do Campo Limpo,1501, São Paulo-SP; São Paulo, São Paulo; Brazil
- Coordinates: 23°38′42″S 46°45′57″W

Information
- Type: Japanese international school
- Website: admsjec.wixsite.com/sjechome

The Escola Japonesa de São Paulo (Portuguese: [isˈkɔlɐ ʒɐpoˈnezɐ dʒi sɐ̃w ˈpawlu], "São Paulo Japanese School"; Japanese: サンパウロ日本人学校, romanized: Sanpauro Nihonjin Gakkō) is a Japanese international day school in Vila Prel, Capão Redondo, Subprefecture of Campo Limpo, São Paulo, operated by the Sociedade Japonesa de Educação e Cultura. It serves students from 6 to 15 years of age in grades 1 through 9. Most of the students have Japanese company executives as parents. The school uses the Japanese curriculum.

== History ==
The school opened on August 14, 1967. From the time of opening until 1981, school enrollment increased due to a corresponding increase in Japanese corporate operations. Enrollment decreased after 1981. In 1997 it had 205 students. Due to an increase in Japanese corporate involvement, from 2011 the student population has increased. As of January 17, 2014 the school has 238 students including 178 elementary school students and 60 junior high students.

== See also ==
- Japanese community of São Paulo
- Brazilian schools in Japan
  - List of Brazilian schools in Japan
