= Jim Cummins (professor) =

Canadian professor (born 1949)

James Cummins (born July 3, 1949) is a professor at the Ontario Institute for Studies in Education of the University of Toronto where he works on language development and literacy development of learners of English as an additional language. In 1979 Cummins coined the acronyms BICS and CALP to refer to processes that help a teacher to qualify a student's language ability.

== BICS (Basic Interpersonal Communicative Skills) ==
BICS refers to the basic communicative fluency achieved by all normal native speakers of a language. It is cognitively undemanding and contextual and is better understood as the language used by students in informal settings, say, on a playground or cafe. Research by Cummins as well as Virginia Collier suggest that it typically takes language learners 1–3 years to develop BICS if they have sufficient exposure to the second language, "with the exception of severely retarded and autistic children".

== CALP (Cognitive Academic Language Proficiency/Academic Language Proficiency) ==
CALP refers to the ability to manipulate language using abstractions in a sophisticated manner. CALP is used while performing in an academic setting. CALP is the ability to think in and use a language as a tool for learning. Cummins's and Collier's research suggest that K-12 students need 5 to 7 years to acquire CALP in the second language if the learner has native language literacy. Learners who do not have strong native language literacy often need 7–10 years to acquire CALP in the second language.

== Bibliography ==
- Cummins, Jim. (1979). Cognitive/Academic Language Proficiency, Linguistic Interdependence, the Optimum Age Question and Some Other Matters. Working Papers on Bilingualism, No. 19.
- Cummins, Jim. (1986). Empowering minority students: A framework for intervention. Harvard educational review, 56(1), 18-37.
- Cummins, Jim, (2003) Bilingual Children's Mother Tongue: Why Is It Important for Education? (fiplv.org).
- Cummins, Jim. (2005) Teaching for Cross-Language Transfer in Dual Language Education: Possibilities and Pitfalls. (achievementseminars.com).
- Cummins, Jim. (2005) Affirming Identity in Multilingual Classrooms. (ascd.org).
- Cummins, Jim. (2008) ELL Students Speak for Themselves: Identity Texts and Literacy Engagement in Multilingual Classrooms. (achievementseminars.com).
- Cummins, James (Jim). Die Bedeutung der Muttersprache mehrsprachiger Kinder für die Schule. (kompetenzzentrum-sprachfoerderung.de).
