= Portuguese language in Asia =

According to the most comprehensive and updated scientific work done about the topic, the 2025 Ethnologue, The Portuguese language is spoken in Asia exclusively by a very small community of speakers, generally L2 speakers, which amount to approximately 320.000 total users. These speakers are distributed through regions which formerly served as colonies to Portugal, notably Macau and East Timor where the language is official albeit not widely spoken, or spoken by immigrants, notably the Brazilians in Japan, where quite possibly the greatest native Portuguese speaking community in Asia is located, as well as by some Afro-Asians and Luso-Asians. In Larantuka, Indonesia and Daman and Diu, India, Portuguese has a religious connotation. According to the Damanese Portuguese-Indian Association, there are 10 – 12,000 Portuguese speakers in the territory. The ethnologue prognostic, however, is much more grim and suggests Portuguese is almost entirely dying out in India, with only a student community of 1.500 L2 speakers. Statistics regarding this topic are vastly variable, in such a way that the figure of total speakers in Asia can be much higher if one chooses to rely on the East Timorese census data (2015/2022), which points out that up to 30-60% of Timorese people have some capability in Portuguese, either at reading, speaking or writing, depending on the source. If this statistic is taken into account, the figure of Asian total speakers of Portuguese can be as high as 1.1 million speakers. The comprehensive study done by Ethnologue however indicates that the proficiency in Portuguese demonstrated by the Timorese may be largely rudimentary and the 63.000 fluent speakers is more certain.

== Geographic distribution ==
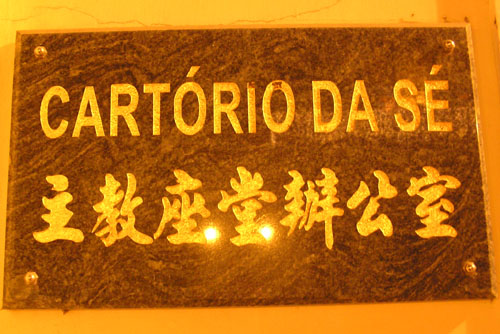
Bilingual sign in Macau

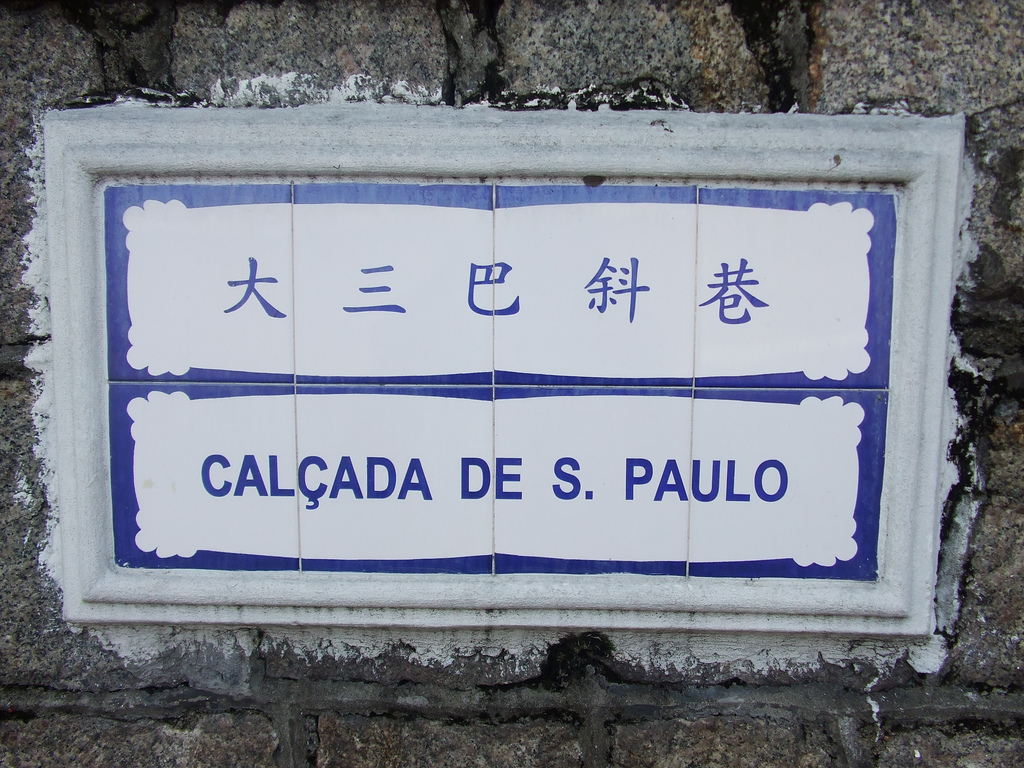
Portuguese and Chinese, seen on this street sign, are official languages in Macau

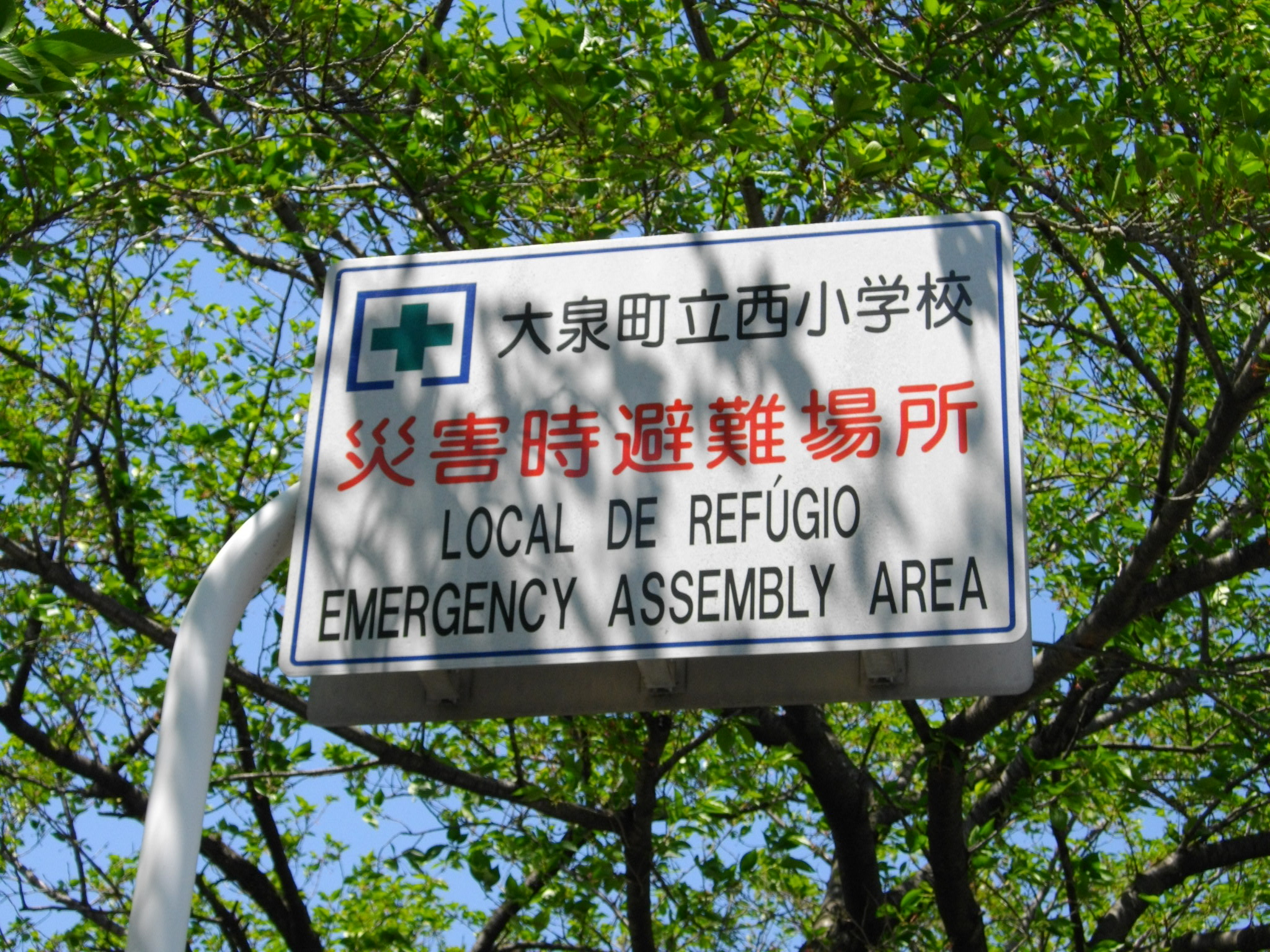
Multilingual sign in Japanese, Portuguese, and English in Oizumi, Japan. Return immigration of Japanese Brazilians has led to a large Portuguese-speaking community in the town.

- Sri Lanka: Formerly known as Ceylon (Ceilão in Portuguese), the island's first European visitors were Portuguese people, who gave the island its original name. The island is home to a Portuguese Burgher minority who speaks Sri Lankan Portuguese Creole. Sri Lanka participated in the Jogos da Lusofonia in 2006 and 2014.
- India: The state of Goa was a part of the Portuguese Empire until 1961. India participated in the Jogos da Lusofonia in 2006 and 2014. Goa is awaiting the permission of the Indian Government to join the CPLP as an observer. In Goa, most of the relatively few speakers of Portuguese are older people. The Union Territory of Dadra and Nagar Haveli and Daman and Diu was also part of Portuguese India. As in Goa, the dwindling number of Portuguese speakers are also older people. Daman and Diu are also home to Indo-Portuguese Creoles. It is estimated that there are 3% – 5% of fluent speakers of Portuguese in Goa, Daman and Diu. The language is still spoken by about 10,000 people, in 2014, an estimated 1,500 students were learning Portuguese in Goa.
- Malaysia and Singapore: The Malaysian state of Malacca and city-state of Singapore are homes to the Gente Kristang a community of Eurasians who claim Portuguese descent and speak Papia Kristang, a Portuguese-lexified Creole. The Portuguese settlement at Malacca is a source of tourism for the state and the Lusophone heritage is visible in cuisine, architecture and folklore of the Kristang people. Pending approval from the Malaysian Government, Malacca may join the CPLP as an associate observer.
- Macau: Portuguese is a co-official language alongside Chinese in the Chinese special administrative region of Macau. It has become the centre for Portuguese learning in Asia and has become the focus through which China relates diplomatically to the member states of CPLP. Macau was the host city for the first Lusophone games in 2006. While the Macanese Patois is by now critically endangered with less than a hundred speakers, the number of speakers of Portuguese has also decreased since the handover in 1999. But enrollments for private Portuguese classes have tripled, to 1,000, since 2002; that prompted public schools here to offer Portuguese, drawing more than 5,000 students. It is now estimated that about 3% of the population speak Portuguese as their first language, while 7% professes fluency.
- East Timor: The Southeast Asian country added Portuguese as an official language as it gained independence from Indonesia in 2002. According to a 2004 census, 36 percent of respondents said they had "a capability in Portuguese". The inter-ethnic lingua franca, Tetum has a large number of loanwords derived from Portuguese making the latter relatively easy to learn for speakers of the former.
- Japan: As of 2023, there were approximately 210,563 (in June 2023) Brazilians living in Japan.

== CPLP ==
Various regions in Asia have expressed interest in participating in the Community of Portuguese Language Countries (CPLP). The Malaysian state of Malacca, Macau, and the Indian state of Goa have all applied for observer or associate member status and are awaiting the permission of the Malaysian, Chinese, and Indian governments, respectively. East Timor joined the CPLP shortly after its independence at the turn of the 21st century. Indonesia, South Korea and Taiwan have also expressed interest in joining the CPLP.

== Instituto Camões ==
The Instituto Camões maintains language centres in Macau, Goa, Busan, Tokyo and Dili.

== Local norms and phonology ==
In Asia, Standard European Portuguese (português-padrão) forms the basis for the written and spoken norm, exclusively to East Timor and Macau. (Note: In Macau, the official spelling of the Portuguese language is fixed by Decree-Law No. 103/99/M)

== See also ==
- East Timorese Portuguese
- Goan Portuguese
- Macau Portuguese
