= Associação Civil de Divulgação Cultural e Educacional Japonesa do Rio de Janeiro =

ACDCEJ do Rio de Janeiro
- リオデジャネイロ日本人学校

Location
- Rua Cosme Velho,1166, Cosme; Rio de Janeiro, Rio de Janeiro; CEP22241-091; Brazil; 22.939518°S 43.20423099999999°W

Information
- Type: Japanese international school
- Established: August 2, 1971
- Website: www.rionichigaku.com

Associação Civil de Divulgação Cultural e Educacional Japonesa do Rio de Janeiro ("Civil Association of Japanese Educational and Cultural Dissemination of Rio de Janeiro"; Japanese: リオ・デ・ジャネイロ日本人学校 Rio de Janeiro Nihonjin Gakkō "Japanese School of Rio de Janeiro") is a Japanese international school in Cosme Velho, Rio de Janeiro, Brazil.

It was established on August 2, 1971 (Shōwa 46). It opened to serve employees of Ishikawajima-Harima Heavy Industries. The student body decreased after the shipyard closed in 1994. The school was previously in Santa Teresa; the former campus became the Ginásio Experimental Olímpico.

== See also ==
- Brazilian schools in Japan
  - List of Brazilian schools in Japan
