= Separation anxiety disorder =

Anxiety disorder

- Specialty: Psychiatry
- Symptoms: Uncontrollable crying, fear of specific persons (e.g., teachers, dentists, doctors, etc.,) High reward system, Reactive attachment disorder
- Usual onset: In infancy
- Duration: 6 months to 6 years
- Treatment: Emotional care, proper education

Separation anxiety disorder (SAD) is an anxiety disorder in which an individual experiences excessive anxiety regarding separation from home and/or from people to whom the individual has a strong emotional attachment (e.g., a parent, caregiver, significant other, or siblings). Separation anxiety is a natural part of the developmental process. It is most common in infants and little children, typically between the ages of six months to three years, although it may pathologically manifest itself in older children, adolescents and adults. Unlike SAD (indicated by excessive anxiety), normal separation anxiety indicates healthy advancements in a child's cognitive maturation and should not be considered a developing behavioral problem.

According to the American Psychiatric Association (APA), separation anxiety disorder is an excessive display of fear and distress when faced with situations of separation from the home and/or from a specific attachment figure. The anxiety that is expressed is categorized as being atypical of the expected developmental level and age. The severity of the symptoms ranges from anticipatory uneasiness to full-blown anxiety about separation.

SAD may cause significant negative effects within areas of social and emotional functioning, family life, and physical health of the disordered individual. The duration of this problem must persist for at least four weeks and must present itself before a child is eighteen years of age to be diagnosed as SAD in children, but can now be diagnosed in adults with a duration typically lasting six months in adults as specified by the DSM-5.

== Background ==
The origins of separation anxiety disorder stem from attachment theory which has roots in the attachment theories both of Sigmund Freud and John Bowlby. Freud's attachment theory, which has similarities to learning theory, proposes that infants have instinctual impulses, and when these impulses go unnoticed, it traumatizes the infant. The infant then learns that when their mother is absent, this will be followed by a distressing lack of gratification, thus making the mother's absence a conditioned stimulus that triggers anxiety in the infant who then expects their needs to be ignored. The result of this association is that the child becomes fearful of all situations that include distance from their caregiver.

John Bowlby's attachment theory also contributed to the thinking process surrounding separation anxiety disorder. His theory is a framework in which to contextualize the relationships that humans form with one another. Bowlby suggests that infants are instinctively motivated to seek proximity with a familiar caregiver, especially when they are alarmed, and they expect that in these moments they will be met with emotional support and protection. He poses that all infants become attached to their caregivers, however, there are individual differences in the way that these attachments develop. There are 4 main attachment styles according to Bowlby; secure attachment, anxious-avoidant attachment, disorganized attachment, and anxious-ambivalent attachment. Anxious-ambivalent attachment is most relevant here because its description, when an infant feels extreme distress and anxiety when their caregiver is absent and does not feel reassured when they return, is very similar to SAD.

== Signs and symptoms ==
=== Academic setting ===
As with other anxiety disorders, children with SAD tend to face more obstacles at school than those without anxiety disorders. Adjustment and relating school functioning have been found to be much more difficult for anxious children. In some severe forms of SAD, children may act disruptively in class or may refuse to attend school altogether. It is estimated that nearly 75% of children with SAD exhibit some form of school refusal behavior.

There are several possible manifestations of this disorder when the child is introduced into an academic setting. A child with SAD may protest profusely upon arrival at school. They might have a hard time saying goodbye to their parents and exhibit behaviors like tightly clinging to the parent in a way that makes it nearly impossible for the parent to detach from them. They might scream and cry but in a way that makes it seem as though they were in pain. The child might scream and cry for an extended period of time after their parents are gone (for several minutes to upwards of an hour) and refuse to interact with other children or teachers, rejecting their attention. They might feel an overwhelming need to know where their parents are and that they are okay.

This is a serious problem because, as children fall further behind in coursework, it becomes increasingly difficult for them to return to school.

Short-term problems resulting from academic refusal include poor academic performance or decline in performance, alienation from peers, and conflict within the family.

Although school refusal behavior is common among children with SAD, school refusal behavior is sometimes linked to generalized anxiety disorder or possibly a mood disorder. That being said, a majority of children with separation anxiety disorder have school refusal as a symptom. Up to 80% of children who refuse school qualify for a diagnosis of separation anxiety disorder.

=== Home setting ===
Symptoms for SAD might persist even in a familiar and/or comfortable setting for the child, like the home. The child might be afraid to be in a room alone even if they know that their parent is in the next room over. They might fear being alone in the room, or going to sleep in a dark room. Problems might present themselves during bedtime, as the child might refuse to go to sleep unless their parent is near and visible. During the day, the child might "shadow" the parent and cling to their side.

=== Workplace ===
Just how SAD affects a child's attendance and participation in school, their avoidance behaviors stay with them as they grow and enter adulthood. Recently, "the effects of mental illness on workplace productivity have become a prominent concern on both the national and international fronts". In general, mental illness is a common health problem among working adults, 20% to 30% of adults will suffer from at least one psychiatric disorder. Mental illness is linked to decreased productivity, and with individuals diagnosed with SAD their levels at which they function decreases dramatically resulting in partial work-days, increase in number of total absences, and "holding back" when it comes to carrying out and completing tasks.

== Cause ==
Factors that contribute to the disorder include a combination and interaction of biological, cognitive, environmental, child temperament, and behavioral factors.

Children are more likely to develop SAD if one or both of their parents was diagnosed with a psychological disorder. Recent research by Daniel Schechter and colleagues have pointed to difficulties of mothers who have themselves had early adverse experiences such as maltreatment and disturbed attachments with their own caregivers, who then go on to develop responses to their infants' and toddlers' normative social bids in the service of social referencing, emotion regulation, and joint attention, which responses are linked to these mothers' own psychopathology (i.e. maternal post-traumatic stress disorder (PTSD) and depression). These atypical maternal responses, which have been shown to be associated with separation anxiety, have been related to disturbances in maternal stress physiologic response to mother-toddler separation, as well as lower maternal neural activity in the brain region of the medial prefrontal cortex, when mothers with and without PTSD were shown video excerpts of their own and unfamiliar toddlers during mother-child separation versus free-play. Living in a low socioeconomic status has also been shown to contribute to childhood SAD by increasing levels of parental depression.

Many psychological professionals have suggested that early or traumatic separation from a central caregiver in a child's life can increase the likelihood of them being diagnosed with SAD, school phobia, and depressive-spectrum disorders. Some children can be more vulnerable to SAD due to their temperament, for example, their level of anxiety when placed in new situations.

=== Environmental ===
Most often, the onset of separation anxiety disorder is caused by a stressful life-event, especially a loss of a loved one or pet, but can also include parental divorce, change of school or neighborhood, natural disasters, or circumstances which forced the individual to be separated from their attachment figure(s). In older individuals, stressful life experiences may include going away to college, moving out for the first time, or becoming a parent.

According to the DSM-5, young adults with separation anxiety disorder have different examples of stress, including leaving their parents' home, entering a romantic relationship, and becoming a parent. In some cases, parental overprotectiveness may be associated with separation anxiety disorder.

=== Genetic and physiological ===
There may be a genetic predisposition in children with separation anxiety disorder. "Separation anxiety disorder in children may be heritable." "Heritability was estimated at 73% in a community sample of 6-year-old twins, with higher rates in girls."

A child's temperament can also impact the development of SAD. Timid and shy behaviors may be referred to as "behaviorally inhibited temperaments" in which the child may experience anxiety when they are not familiar with a particular location or person. Low levels of child effortful control and self-regulation, the abilities to regulate one's emotional, sensory, and behavioral responses and impulses, have also been shown to contribute to the development of SAD. Additionally, higher levels of child negative affect, or tendencies to display negative emotions and remain in such a state, also predict SAD.

There are also unique genetic traits that may contribute to SAD development in adulthood. One study found that negative temperament predicted higher levels of adult separation anxiety.

== Mechanism ==
Preliminary evidence shows that heightened activity of the amygdala may be associated with symptoms of separation anxiety disorder. Defects in the ventrolateral and dorsomedial areas of the prefrontal cortex are also correlated to anxiety disorders in children.

== Diagnosis ==
Separation anxiety occurs in many infants and young children as they are becoming acclimated with their surroundings. This anxiety is viewed as a normal developmental phase between the months of early infancy until age two. Separation anxiety is normal in young children, until they age 3–4 years, when children are left in a daycare or preschool, away from their parent or primary caregiver. Other sources note that a definite diagnosis of SAD should not be presented until after the age of three.

Some studies have shown that hormonal influences during pregnancy can result in lower cortisol levels later in life, which can later lead to psychological disorders, such as SAD. It is also important to note significant life changes experienced by the child either previous to or present at the onset of the disorder. For example, children who emigrated from another country at an early age may have a stronger tendency for developing this disorder, as they have already felt displaced from a location they were starting to become accustomed to. It is not uncommon for them to incessantly cling to their caregiver at first upon arrival to the new location, especially if the child is unfamiliar with the language of their new country. These symptoms may diminish or go away as the child becomes more accustomed to the new surroundings. Separation anxiety may be diagnosed as a disorder if the child's anxiety related to separation from the home or attachment figure is deemed excessive; if the level of anxiety surpasses that of the acceptable caliber for the child's developmental level and age; and if the anxiety negatively impacts the child's everyday life.

Many psychological disorders begin to emerge during childhood. Nearly two-thirds of adults with psychological disorder show signs of their disorder earlier in life. However, not all psychological disorders are present before adulthood. In many cases, there are no signs during childhood.

Behavioral inhibition (BI) plays a large role in many anxiety disorders, SAD included. Compared to children without it, children with BI demonstrate more signs of fear when experiencing a new stimulus, particularly those that are social in nature. Children with BI are at a higher risk for developing a mental disorder, particularly anxiety disorders, than children without BI.

To be diagnosed with SAD, one must display at least three of the following criteria:

- Recurrent excessive distress when anticipating or experiencing separation from home or from major attachment figures
- Persistent and excessive worry about losing major attachment figures or about possible harm to them, such as illness, injury, disasters, or death
- Persistent and excessive worry about experiencing an untoward event (e.g., getting lost, being kidnapped, having an accident, becoming ill) that causes separation from a major attachment figure
- Persistent reluctance or refusal to go out, away from home, to school, to work, or elsewhere because of fear of separation
- Persistent and excessive fear of or reluctance about being alone or without major attachment figures at home or in other settings
- Persistent reluctance or refusal to sleep away from home or to go to sleep without being near a major attachment figure
- Repeated nightmares involving the theme of separation
- Repeated complaints of physical symptoms (e.g., headaches, stomachaches, nausea, vomiting) when separation from major attachment figures occurs or is anticipated

=== Classification ===
Separation anxiety is common for infants between the ages of eight and fourteen months and occurs as infants begin to understand their own selfhood—or understand that they are separate persons from their primary caregiver. Infants oftentimes look for their caregivers to give them a sense of comfort and familiarity, which causes separation to become challenging. Subsequently, the concept of object permanence emerges—which is when children learn that something still exists when it cannot be seen or heard, thus increasing their awareness of being separated from their caregiver. Consequently, during the developmental period where an infant's sense self, incorporating object permanence as well, the child also begins to understand that they can in fact be separated from their primary caregiver. They see this separation as something final though, and don't yet understand that their caregiver will return causing fear and distress for the infant. It is when an individual (infant, child, or otherwise) consistently reacts to separation with excessive anxiety and distress and experiences a great deal of interference from their anxiety that a diagnosis of separation anxiety disorder (SAD) can be warranted.

One of the difficulties in the identification of separation anxiety disorder in children is that it is highly comorbid with other behavioral disorders, especially generalized anxiety disorder. Behaviors such as refusal or hesitancy in attending school or homesickness for example, can easily reflect similar symptoms and behavioral patterns that are commonly associated with SAD, but could be an overlap of symptoms. The prevalence of co-occurring disorders in adults with separation anxiety disorder is common and includes a much broader spectrum of diagnostic possibilities. Common co-morbidities can include specific phobias, PTSD, panic disorder, obsessive-compulsive disorder, and personality disorders. It is very common for psychological disorders to overlap and even lead to the manifestation of another, especially when it comes to anxiety disorders. Because of the variation and overlap in symptoms a proper, thorough evaluation of the individual is critical to distinguish the differences and significance. An important signifier to establish a difference between SAD and other anxiety or psychological disorders is to investigate where the individual's fear of separation is stemming from; this can be accomplished by asking "what they fear will occur during a separation from their significant other".

What stands out about SAD, as mentioned above, are the avoidance behaviors which present within an individual. Individuals "typically exhibit excessive distress manifested by crying, repeated complaints of physical symptoms (e.g., stomach aches, headaches, etc.), avoidance (e.g., refusing to go to school, to sleep alone, to be left alone in the home, to engage in social events, to go to work, etc.), and engagement in safety behaviors (e.g., frequent calls to or from significant others, or primary caregivers)".

=== Assessment methods ===
Assessment methods include diagnostic interviews, self-report measures from both the parent and child, observation of parent-child interaction, and specialized assessment for preschool-aged children. Various facets of a child's development including social life, feeding and sleep schedules, medical issues, traumatic events experienced, family history of mental or anxiety health issues are explored. The compilation of aspects of a child's life aids in capturing a multi-dimensional view of the child's life.

Additionally, while much research has been done in efforts to further understand separation anxiety in regards to the relationship between infants' and their caregivers, it was behavioral psychologist, Mary Ainsworth, who devised a behavioral evaluation method, The Strange Situation (1969), which, at the time, was considered to be the most valuable and famous body of research in the study of separation anxiety. The Strange Situation process assisted in evaluating and measuring the individual attachment styles of infants between the ages of 9 and 18 months. In this observational study an environment is created that fluctuates between familiar and unfamiliar situations that would be experienced in everyday life. The variations in stressfulness and the child's responses are observed and, based on the interaction behavior that is directed towards the caregiver, the infant is categorized into one of four different types of attachment styles: 1. Secure, 2. Anxious-avoidant, insecure, 3. Anxious-ambivalent/resistant, insecure and 4. Disorganized/disoriented.

Clinicians may utilize interviews as an assessment tool to gauge the symptomatic occurrences to aid in diagnosing SAD. Interviews may be conducted with the child and also with the attachment figure. Interviewing both child and parent separately allows for the clinician to compile different points of view and information.

Commonly used interviews include:

- Anxiety Disorders Interview Schedule for the DSM-IV, Child Parent Versions (ADIS-IV-C/P)
- Diagnostic Interview Schedule for Children, Version IV (DISC-IV)
- Schedule for Affective Disorders and Schizophrenia for School-aged Children-Present and lifetime version IV (K-SADS-IV)

=== Self-report measures ===
This form of assessment should not be the sole basis of a SAD diagnosis. It is also important to verify that the child who is reporting on their experiences has the cognitive and communication skills appropriate to accurately comprehend and respond to these measurements. An example of a self-report tool that has been tested is: The Separation Anxiety Assessment Scale for Children (SAAS-C). The scale contains 34 items and is divided into six dimensions. The dimensions in order are: Abandonment, Fear of Being Alone, Fear of Physical Illness, Worry about Calamitous Events, Frequency of Calamitous Events, and Safety Signal Index. The first five dimensions have a total of five items while the last one contains nine items. The scale goes beyond assessing symptoms; it focuses on individual cases and treatment planning.

=== Observation ===
As noted by Altman, McGoey & Sommer, it is important to observe the child, "in multiple contexts, on numerous occasions, and in their everyday environments (home, daycare, preschool)". It is beneficial to view parent and child interactions and behaviors that may contribute to SAD.

Dyadic Parent-Child Interaction Coding System and recently the Dyadic Parent-Child Interaction Coding System II (DPICS II) are methods used when observing parents and children interactions.

Separation Anxiety Daily Diaries (SADD) have also been used to "assess anxious behaviors along with their antecedents and consequences and may be particularly suited to SAD given its specific focus on parent–child separation" (Silverman & Ollendick, 2005). The diaries are carefully evaluated for validity.

=== Preschool-aged children ===
At the preschool-aged stage, early identification and intervention is crucial. The communication abilities of young children are taken into consideration when creating age-appropriate assessments.

A commonly used assessment tool for preschool-aged children (ages 2–5) is the Preschool Age Psychiatric Assessment (PAPA). Additional questionnaires and rating scales that are used to assess the younger population include the Achenbach Scales, the Fear Survey Schedule for Infants and Preschoolers, and The Infant–Preschool Scale for Inhibited Behaviors.

Preschool children are also interviewed. Two interviews that are sometimes conducted are Attachment Doll-Play and Emotional Knowledge. In both of the assessments the interviewer depicts a scenario where separation and reunion occur; the child is then told to point at one of the four facial expressions presented. These facial expressions show emotions such as anger or sadness. The results are then analyzed.

Behavioral observations are also utilized when assessing the younger population. Observations enable the clinician to view some of the behaviors and emotions in specific contexts.

== Treatment ==
=== Non-medication based ===
Non-medication based treatments are the first choice when treating individuals diagnosed with separation anxiety disorder. Counseling tends to be the best replacement for drug treatments. There are two different non-medication approaches to treat separation anxiety. The first is a psychoeducational intervention, often used in conjunction with other therapeutic treatments. This specifically involves educating the individual and their family so that they are knowledgeable about the disorder, as well as parent counseling and guiding teachers on how to help the child. The second is a psychotherapeutic intervention when prior attempts are not effective. Psychotherapeutic interventions are more structured and include behavioral, cognitive-behavioral, contingency, psychodynamic psychotherapy, and family therapy.

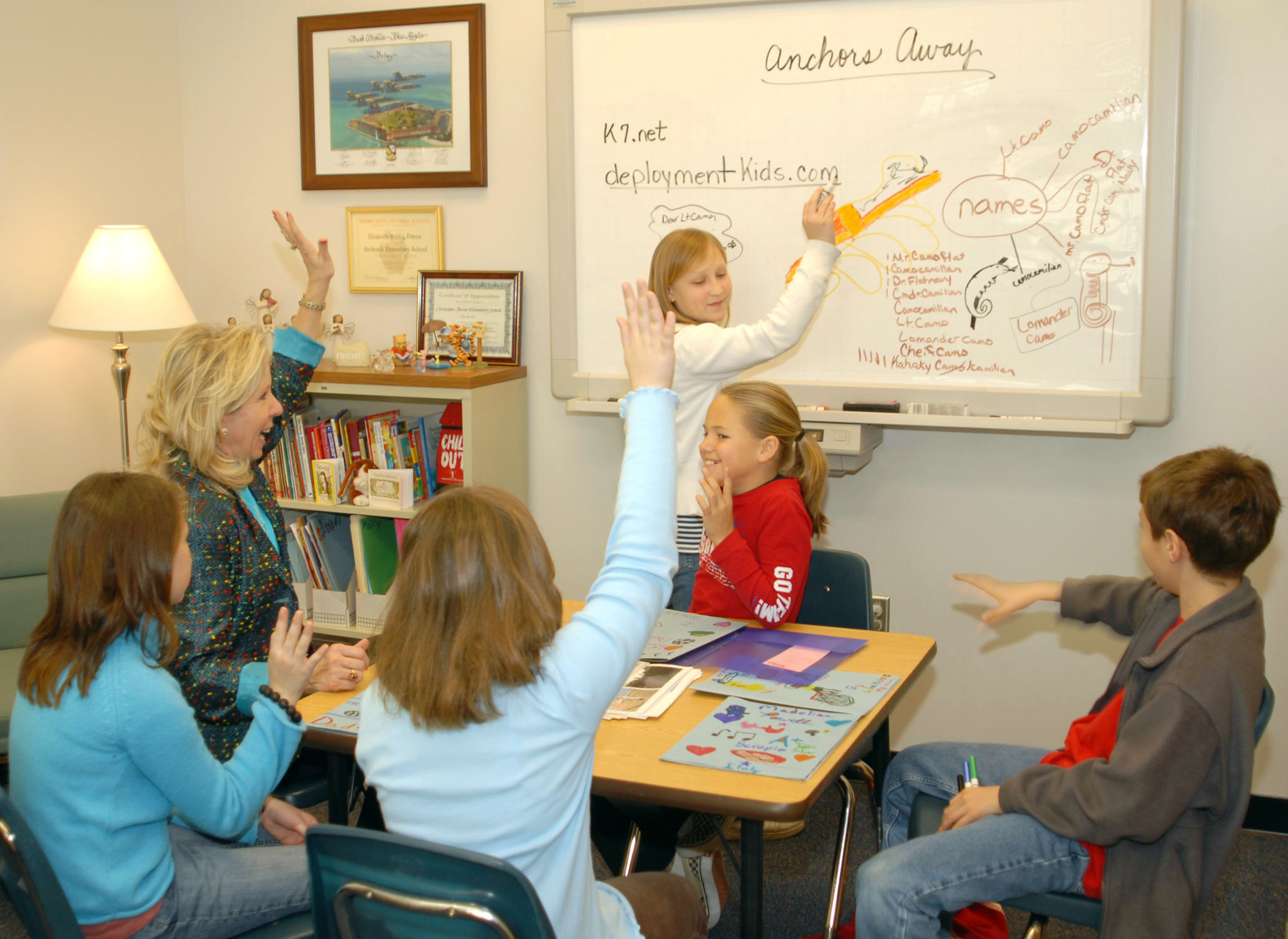
Anchors Away program for children with anxiety disorder

==== Exposure and behavioral therapy ====
Behavioral therapies are types of non-medication based treatment which are mainly exposure-based techniques. These include techniques such as systematic desensitization, emotive imagery, participant modelling and contingency management. Behavioral therapies carefully expose individuals by small increments to slowly reduce their anxiety over time and mainly focuses on their behavior. Exposure based therapy works under the principle of habituation that is derived from learning theory. The core concept of exposure therapy is that anxiety about situations, people, and things does not go away when people avoid the things that they fear, but rather, the uncomfortable feelings are simply kept at bay. In order to effectively diminish the negative feelings associated with the situation of fear, one must address them directly. In order to administer this treatment, the therapist and the anxious child might sit together and identify progressively intense situations. As each situation is dealt with masterfully, the child advances to the next phase of intensity. This pattern continues until the child is able to handle being away from their parent in a developmentally typical way that causes them and their caregiver(s) minimal amounts of stress. While there is some controversy about using exposure therapy with children, it is generally agreed upon that exposure therapy in the context of SAD is acceptable as it may be the most effective form of therapy in treating this disorder and there is minimal risk associated with the intervention in this context.

==== Contingency management ====
Contingency management is a form of treatment found to be effective for younger children with SAD. Contingency management revolves around a reward system with verbal or tangible reinforcement requiring parental involvement. A contingency contract is written up between the parent and the child, which entails a written agreement about specific goals that the child will try to achieve and the specific reward the parent will provide once the task is accomplished. When the child undergoing contingency management shows signs of independence or achieves their treatment goals, they are praised or given their reward. This facilitates a new positive experience with what used to be filled with fear and anxiety. Children in preschool who show symptoms of SAD do not have the communicative ability to express their emotions or the self-control ability to cope with their separation anxiety on their own, so parental involvement is crucial in younger cases of SAD.

==== Cognitive behavioral therapy ====
Cognitive behavioral therapy (CBT) focuses on helping children with SAD reduce feelings of anxiety through practices of exposure to anxiety-inducing situations and active metacognition to reduce anxious thoughts.

CBT has three phases: education, application and relapse prevention. In the education phase, the individual is informed on the different effects anxiety can have physically and more importantly mentally. By understanding and being able to recognize their reactions, it will help to manage and eventually reduce their overall response.

According to Kendall and colleagues, there are four components which must be taught to a child undergoing CBT:

1. Recognizing anxious feelings and behaviors
2. Discussing situations that provoke anxious behaviors
3. Developing a coping plan with appropriate reactions to situations
4. Evaluating effectiveness of the coping plan

In the application phase, individuals can take what they know and apply it in real time situations for helpful exposure. The most important aspect of this phase is for the individuals to ultimately manage themselves throughout the process. In the relapse prevention phase, the individual is informed that continued exposure and application of what worked for them is the key to continual progress.

A study investigated the content of thoughts in anxious children who suffered from separation anxiety as well as from social phobia or generalized anxiety. The results suggested that cognitive therapy for children suffering from separation anxiety (along with social phobia and generalized anxiety) should be aimed at identifying negative cognition of one's own behavior in the threat of anxiety-evoking situations and to modify these thoughts to promote self-esteem and ability to properly cope with the given situation.

Cognitive procedures are a form of treatment found to be ideal for older children with SAD. The theory behind this technique is that the child's dysfunctional thoughts, attitudes, and beliefs are what leads to anxiety and causes anxious behavior. Children who are being treated with cognitive procedures are taught to ask themselves if there is "evidence" to support their anxious thoughts and behaviors. They are taught "coping thoughts" to replace previously distorted thoughts during anxiety-inducing situations such as doing a reality check to assess the realistic danger of a situation and then to praise themselves for handling the situation bravely. Examples of such disordered thoughts include polarized thinking, overgeneralization, filtering (focusing on negative), jumping to conclusions, catastrophizing, emotional reasoning, labeling, "shoulds", and placing blame on self and others. Sometimes therapists will involve parents and teach them behavioral tactics such as contingency management.

=== Medication ===
The use of medication is applied in extreme cases of SAD when other treatment options have been utilized and failed. However, it has been difficult to prove the benefits of drug treatment in patients with SAD because there have been many mixed results. Despite all the studies and testings, there has yet to be a specific medication for SAD. Medication prescribed for adults from the Food and Drug Administration (FDA) are often used and have been reported to show positive results for children and adolescents with SAD.

There are mixed results regarding the benefits of using tricyclic antidepressants (TCAs), which includes imipramine and clomipramine. One study suggested that imipramine is helpful for children with "school phobia," who also had an underlying diagnosis of SAD. However, other studies have also shown that imipramine and clomipramine had the same effect of children who were treated with the medication and placebo. The most promising medication is the use of selective serotonin reuptake inhibitors (SSRI) in adults and children. Several studies have shown that patients treated with fluvoxamine were significantly better than those treated with placebo. They showed decreasing anxiety symptoms with short-term and long-term use of the medication.

== Prognosis ==
Discomfort from separations in children from ages 8 to 14 months is normal. Children oftentimes get nervous or afraid of unfamiliar people and places but if the behavior still occurs after the age of six and if it lasts longer than four weeks, the child might have separation anxiety disorder. About 4% of children have the disorder. Separation anxiety disorder is very treatable especially when caught early on with medication and behavioral therapies. Helping children with separation anxiety to identify the circumstances that elicit their anxiety (upcoming separation events) is important. A child's ability to tolerate separations should gradually increase over time when he or she is gradually exposed to the feared events. Encouraging a child with separation anxiety disorder to feel competent and empowered, as well as to discuss feelings associated with anxiety-provoking events promotes recovery.

Children with separation anxiety disorder often respond negatively to perceived anxiety in their caretakers, in that parents and caregivers who also have anxiety disorders may unwittingly confirm a child's unrealistic fears that something terrible may happen if they are separated from each other. Thus, it is critical that parents and caretakers become aware of their own feelings and communicate a sense of safety and confidence about separation.

=== Longitudinal effects ===
Several studies aim to understand the long-term mental health consequences of SAD. SAD contributed to vulnerability and acted as a strong risk factor for developing other mental disorders in people aged 19–30. Specifically disorders including panic disorder and depressive disorders were more likely to occur. Other sources also support the increased likelihood of displaying either of the two psychopathologies with previous history of childhood SAD.

Studies show that children who have separation anxiety at younger ages have more complex fear acquisition. This means that there is likely an interplay between associative and non-associative processes concerning fear and anxiety later in life.

Beyond mental health outcomes, SAD has also been shown to impact other important areas of functioning as well. For preschool children, high and persistent levels of separation anxiety were shown to predict worse academic achievement, poorer physical health, and higher internalizing symptoms throughout middle-childhood and early adolescence.

== Epidemiology ==
Anxiety disorders are the most common type of psychopathology to occur in today's youth, affecting from 5–25% of children worldwide. Of these anxiety disorders, SAD accounts for a large proportion of diagnoses. SAD may account for up to 50% of the anxiety disorders as recorded in referrals for mental health treatment. SAD is noted as one of the earliest-occurring of all anxiety disorders. Adult separation anxiety disorder affects roughly 7% of adults, though it has also been shown to occur in between 23 and 42% of adults in clinical samples. It has also been reported that the clinically anxious pediatric population are considerably larger. For example, according to Hammerness et al. (2008) SAD accounted for 49% of admissions.

Research suggests that 4.1% of children will experience a clinical level of separation anxiety. Of that 4.1% it is calculated that nearly a third of all cases will persist into adulthood if left untreated. Research continues to explore the implications that early dispositions of SAD in childhood may serve as risk factors for the development of mental disorders throughout adolescence and adulthood.

It is presumed that a much higher percentage of children suffer from a small amount of separation anxiety, and are not actually diagnosed. Multiple studies have found higher rates of SAD in girls than in boys, and that paternal absence may increase the chances of SAD in girls.

== See also ==
- Homesickness
- Separation anxiety in dogs
- Stranger anxiety
- James Robertson
