= School refusal =

Child-motivated reluctance to attend school

School refusal is a child-motivated refusal to attend school or difficulty remaining in class for the full day. Child-motivated absenteeism occurs autonomously, by the volition of the child. This behavior is differentiated from non-child-motivated absences in which parents withdraw children from school or are unable to bring their children to school for circumstances such as homelessness. School refusal is characterized by avoidance and/or emotional distress at the time of attending school.

Rates of absenteeism due to school refusal behavior manifest in a variety of ways and are defined, tracked, and reported differently among schools and school districts. Academic literature estimates that school refusal occurs in 1–2% of the general population and in 5–15% of youth who are referred to clinics.

== Classification ==
School refusal behavior is characterized by an emotional and behavioral component. The emotional component consists of severe emotional distress at the time attending school. The behavioral component manifests as school attendance difficulties. School refusal is not classified as a disorder by the Diagnostic and Statistical Manual of Mental Disorders [DSM-5].

=== Emotional ===
Emotional distress typically does not occur until the morning before the child is to attend school, and is often accompanied by physical symptoms, the degree of distress exhibited varying among children. There is also an instant return to a stable mood after the child decides not to attend school or is removed from school.

=== Behavioral ===
School attendance difficulties include a broad range of different behaviors. The spectrum of refusal spans from occasional reluctance to complete refusal. Students may miss the entire day, a partial day, skip class, or arrive late.

=== Assessment ===
Because school refusal behavior is a multifaceted issue, there is not a single valid measure or assessment method for diagnosis. Assessment first involves measuring and evaluating the number of days the child is absent, late, or leaving school early. Parent reports and self-reports from the child regarding emotional distress and resistance towards attendance are taken into account. The assessment aims to (1) confirm that the behavior represents school refusal as opposed to truancy or legitimate absence, (2) evaluate the extent and severity of absenteeism, (3) the type(s) and severity of emotional distress, (4) obtain information regarding the child, family, school, and community factors that may be contributing to the behavior, and (5) use the information obtained to develop a working hypothesis that is used for planning appropriate interventions. Tools used to obtain information about school refusal behavior include clinical behavioral interviews, diagnostic interviews, self-report measures of internalizing symptoms, self-monitoring, parent- and teacher-completed measures of internalizing and externalizing problems, review of attendance record, and systematic functional analysis.

== Signs and symptoms ==
School refusal behavior is a heterogeneous behavior characterized by a variety of internalizing and externalizing symptoms. Internalizing symptoms include anxiety (general, social, and separation anxiety), social withdrawal, fatigue, fear, and/or depression. Children may also have complaints of somatic symptoms such as headaches, stomachaches, or a sore throat. Children may also exhibit externalizing symptoms such as nausea, vomiting, sweating, diarrhea, or difficulties breathing as a result of their anxiety. Other externalizing symptoms include defiance, aggression, tantrums, clinging to a parent, refusing to move, and/or running away. If the child stays home from school, these symptoms might go away but come back the next morning before school.

Researchers are motivated to assess and treat this behavior because of its prevalence and potential negative consequences. Short-term negative consequences of school refusal for the child include distress, social alienation, and declining grades. Familial conflict and legal trouble may also result. Excessive absenteeism is commonly associated with various negative health and social problems.

Problematic school absenteeism is also associated with illicit drug use (including tobacco), suicide attempts, poor nutrition, risky sexual behavior, teenage pregnancy, violence, injury, driving under the influence of alcohol, and binge drinking.

== Causes ==
School refusal behavior includes absenteeism due to a broad range of potential causes. School refusal can be classified by the primary factor that motivates the child's absence. School refusal behavior has no single cause. Rather it has a broad range of contributing factors that include the individual, family, school, and community. The School Refusal Assessment Scale identifies four functional causes: (1) avoiding school‐based stimuli that provoke negative effects, (2) escaping aversive social and/or evaluative situations, (3) pursuing attention from significant others, and/or (4) pursuing tangible rewards outside of school. Categories one and two refer to school refusal motivated by negative reinforcement. Categories three and four represent refusal for positive reinforcement.

The onset of school refusal can be sudden or gradual. In cases of sudden onset, refusal often begins after a period of legitimate absence. The problem may start following vacations, school holidays, or brief illness. It can also occur after a stressful event, such as moving to a new house, or the death of a pet or relative. Gradual onset emerges over time as a few sporadically missed days become a pattern of non-attendance.

There are a broad range of risk factors, which may interact and change over time. Within the literature the risk factors are typically condensed into four categories: individual, family, school, and community.

Risk Factors for School Refusal Behavior
Individual Factors	Family Factors	School Factors	Community Factors
behavioral inhibition; fear of failure; low self-efficacy; physical illness; learning difficulties	separation and divorce; parent mental health issues; overprotective parenting style; dysfunctional interactions; loss or bereavement; high levels of family stress	bullying; physical education; transitioning into secondary school; school day structure; tests or exams; peer or staff relationship difficulties; emergency drills	pressure to achieve academically; inconsistent professional advice; poor support services

There are a variety of primary and comorbid disorders associated with school avoidance behavior. Common diagnoses include separation anxiety disorder (22.4%), generalized anxiety disorder (10.5%), oppositional defiant disorder (8.4%), depression (4.9%), specific phobia (4.2%), social anxiety disorder (3.5%), and conduct disorder (2.8%). It is also associated with autism. Negative reinforcement school refusal behavior is associated with anxiety-related disorders, such as generalized anxiety disorder. Attention-seeking school refusal behavior is associated with separation-anxiety disorder. School refusal classified by the pursuit of tangible reinforcement is associated with conduct disorder and oppositional defiant disorder.

=== Bullying ===
At times a child may refuse to go to school because they are being bullied. The possibility of bullying, including cyber bullying, should always be evaluated as part of assessing school refusers. Some children will willingly report being bullied; however, others may be ashamed of their inability to stand up to bullying and wish to conceal the fact that they are bullied within their schools—by other students, or in some cases by teachers—or harassed via texting, e-mail, or social media used to intimidate the child.

== Treatment ==
The primary goal of treatment for school refusal behavior is for the child to regularly and voluntarily attend school with less emotional distress. Some scholars also emphasize the importance of helping the child manage social, emotional, and behavioral problems that are the result of prolonged school nonattendance. Treatment of school refusal depends on the primary cause of the behavior and the particular individual, family, and school factors affecting the child. Analysis of the child's behavior often involves the perspective of the parent/family, school, and child. When school refusal is motivated by anxiety, treatment relies mostly on child therapy during which children learn to control their anxiety with relaxation training, enhancement of social competence, cognitive therapy, and exposure. For children who refuse school in pursuit of attention from parents, parent training is often the focus of treatment. Parents are taught to set routines for their children and punish and reward them appropriately. For children refusing school in pursuit of rewards outside of school, treatment often takes a family-based approach, using family-based contingency contracting and communication skills training. In some instances, children may also engage in peer refusal skills training.

== Epidemiology ==
There are no accurate figures regarding the prevalence of school refusal behavior because of the wide variation in how the behavior is defined, tracked, and reported across schools, school districts, and countries. The most widely accepted prevalence rate is 1–2% of school-aged children. In clinic-referred youth samples the prevalence rate is 5–15%. There are no known relationships between school refusal behavior and gender, income level, or race. Whilst refusal behavior can occur at any time, it occurs more frequently during major changes in a child’s life, such as entering kindergarten (ages 5–6), changing from elementary to middle school (ages 10–11), or changing from middle to high school (age 14).

== History ==
There has been little consensus on the best method for organizing and classifying children demonstrating school refusal behavior. School refusal was initially termed psychoneurotic truancy and characterized as a school phobia. The terms fear‐based school phobia, anxiety‐based school refusal, and delinquent‐based truancy were commonly described as school refusal behavior. In early studies, children were diagnosed with a school phobia when they exhibited (1) persistent difficulties attending school, (2) severe emotional upset at the prospect of going to school, (3) parental knowledge of the absence, and (4) no antisocial characteristics. These criteria were later declared inadequate in capturing the full range of school refusal behavior. While the term school phobia is still commonly employed, this anxiety-based classification is not appropriate for all cases of school refusal. School refusal is now considered an umbrella term for non-truant problematic absenteeism, regardless of the root cause.

== See also ==
- Separation anxiety disorder
- Autism
- Bullying
- Fushūgaku
- Hikikomori – a phenomenon in Japan of social isolation that often starts out as school refusal
- Tantrum
- Truancy

== Notes ==
- Fremont, Wanda P.; Smucny, John (2003). "School Refusal in Children and Adolescents". American Family Physician. 68 (8): 1555–1561. PMID 14596443.
