= Fushūgaku =

Japanese term meaning "non-attendance of school"

Fushūgaku (不就学) is a Japanese term meaning "non-attendance of school". Fushūgaku refers to students in Japan, primarily foreigners and non-citizens, that are not currently attending school. However, the term is generally used for people that never registered for school instead of people that registered but are not attending.

== Characteristics ==
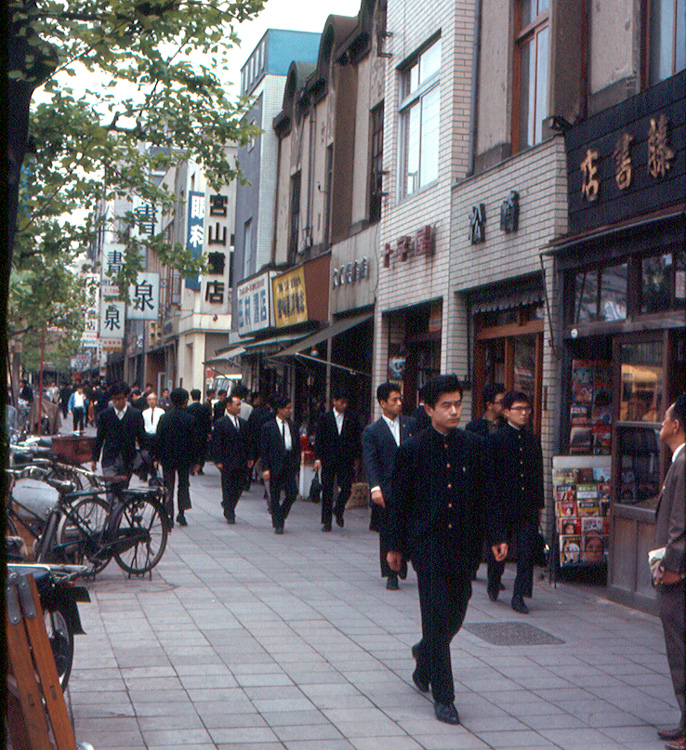
A student, on "Bookstore Street" in Tokyo, 1967

There are numerous reasons as to why these children do not go to school. There are many cases where they cannot understand the Japanese language. In other cases they may be able to understand both Japanese and their own native language, but their level of conversation is insufficient to participate in class lessons. Bullying by native Japanese students may also contribute to their choice not to attend school. In other cases, the children have parents who both work to support the family, and the children end up being left at home alone. In these families, they spend time together late at night after their parents stop working. On their parents' day off, they go out late at night together (shopping, etc.) They pass their time at autonomous Japanese language classrooms that were built for the children of foreigners. These parents are usually blue-collar workers.

Other reasons are that the parents of fushugaku children want their children to go to a school where they would use their native language. However, such schools cost between 30,000 and 50,000 yen per month, so parents cannot afford to send their children.

It is required by law that Japanese students go to school for nine years covering elementary through junior high school. However, this requirement does not exist for children with foreign citizenship living in Japan. For this reason it is not uncommon for these children to not go to school. In May 2019, an MEXT survey found that 15.8% of eligible foreign students are not attending Japanese elementary and junior high schools.

== See also ==
- Brazilian schools in Japan
- Brazilians in Japan
- Hikikomori
- Homeschooling
- School refusal
- Truancy
