= Brazilian fashion =

Fashion in Brazil reflects the country's cultural heritage, historical legacy, and contemporary global influences.

== History ==
Brazilian fashion traces its origins to indigenous practices, where garments made from natural materials reflected cultural identities and environmental adaptations. Starting with European colonization in the 16th century, Portuguese styles and fabrics introduced new elements to Brazilian attire, blending with local traditions. During the 19th and early 20th centuries, Brazilian fashion acquired its own visual identity through clothing, distinct from European fashion centers.

== Influence of media ==
The media, particularly television and telenovelas, have played a pivotal role in shaping Brazilian fashion trends and consumer behavior. Telenovelas popularized fashion styles among viewers, both domestically and globally. Characters in iconic telenovelas like Dancing Days in the 1970s disseminated the disco style in Brazil; O Clone inspired numerous fashion trends with its Islamic inspired theme.

In the 2000s the influence of digital influencers and celebrities on fashion consumption in Brazil has become increasingly pronounced, leveraging their social media presence to shape consumer preferences and drive sales. While in the 20th century fashion magazines dictated fashion, in the 21st century social media influencers create fashions and trends.

== Academic exploration ==
Academic interest in Brazilian fashion has surged since the 1970s, transforming what was once an overlooked field into a viable field of study. Research now explores social dynamics, class distinctions, and gender issues through the lens of fashion. Academic institutions across Brazil have expanded undergraduate courses, hosted academic events, and published significant research on clothing and fashion.

== Sustainability ==
Recent decades have witnessed a growing emphasis on sustainability and ethical practices within Brazilian fashion, reflecting global trends.
