= Brazilians in Japan =

Ethnic group in Japan

ブラジル系日本人 (Japanese) Brasileiro-japoneses (Portuguese)

Total population
- 210,014 (in December, 2025)

Regions with significant populations
- Nagoya, Hamamatsu, Toyohashi, Toyota, Ōizumi, Echizen, Takaoka

Languages
- Portuguese, Japanese

Religion
- Roman Catholicism, Japanese new religions Minority: Buddhism and Shinto

Related ethnic groups
- Brazilians, Japanese people, Japanese Brazilians, Peruvians in Japan

There is a significant community of Brazilians in Japan, consisting largely but not exclusively of Brazilians of Japanese descent. Brazilians with Japanese descent are commonly known as Nikkei Brazilians or Brazilian Japanese people (Portuguese: brasileiro-japoneses, Japanese: ブラジル系日本人, burajiru kei nihonjin). They constitute the largest number of native Portuguese speakers in Asia, greater than those of formerly Portuguese East Timor, Macao and Goa combined. Likewise, Brazil maintains its status as home to the largest Japanese community outside Japan. Japan is also home to the fifth largest Brazilian diaspora (after the United States, Portugal, Paraguay and the United Kingdom) in the world.

The number of Brazilian citizens in Japan peaked in 2007 at 316,967, after which it began to decline and stabilized at 210,000 by the early 2020s.

== Migration history ==
During the 1980s, the Japanese economic situation improved and achieved stability. Many Japanese Brazilians, mainly Japanese citizenship holding first and second generation, went to Japan as contract workers due to economic problems in Brazil. They were termed "Dekasegi".

In 1990, the Japanese government authorized the legal entry through visas of Japanese and their descendants until the third generation in Japan. At that time, Japan was receiving a large number of illegal immigrants from Pakistan, Bangladesh, China and Thailand. The legislation of 1990 was intended to select immigrants who entered Japan, giving a clear preference for Japanese descendants from South America, especially Brazil. These people were lured to Japan to work in areas that the Japanese refused (the so-called "three K": Kitsui, Kitanai and Kiken – dirty, dangerous and demeaning). Many Japanese Brazilians began to immigrate. The influx of Japanese descendants from Brazil to Japan was and continues to be large. By 1998, there were 222,217 Brazilians in Japan, making up 81% of all Latin Americans there (with most of the remainder being Japanese Peruvians and Japanese Argentines).

Because of their Japanese ancestry, the Japanese government believed that Brazilians would be more easily integrated into Japanese society. In fact, this easy integration did not happen, since Japanese Brazilians and their children born in Japan are treated as foreigners by native Japanese. Even people who were born in Japan and immigrated at an early age to Brazil and then returned to Japan are treated as foreigners. Despite the fact that most Brazilians in Japan look Japanese and have a recent Japanese background, they do not "act Japanese" and have a Brazilian identity, and in many if not most cases speak Portuguese as their first or only language. This apparent contradiction between being and seeming causes conflicts of adaptation for the migrants and their acceptance by the natives. (There have been comparable problems in Germany with Russians of ethnic German descent, showing that this phenomenon is not necessarily unique to Japan.)

In April 2009, due to the financial crisis, the Japanese government introduced a new program that would incentivize Brazilian and other Latin American immigrants to return home with a stipend of $3000 for airfare and $2000 for each dependent. Those who participated must have agreed not to pursue employment in Japan in the future.

The number of Brazilian citizens in Japan peaked in 2007 at 316,967, after which it began to decline and stabilized at 210,000 by the early 2020s.

As of December 2025, there were 210,014 Brazilian nationals in Japan, of whom 117,593 were permanent residents. The number of Brazilian citizens residing in Japan who are spouses of Japanese citizens peaked in 1997 at 113,319 (there were 274,475 foreign spouses of Japanese citizens in Japan that year), or 41.29% of all foreign spouses of Japanese citizens residing in Japan. The number of foreign spouses of Japanese citizens residing in Japan peaked in 2001 at 280,436, of which 97,262 were Brazilian citizens that year, or 34.68% of all foreign spouses of Japanese citizens. It then began to decline, reaching 152,898 by the end of 2025, of which 14,166 were Brazilian citizens that year, or 9.27% of all foreign spouses of Japanese citizens. It's difficult to determine how many Brazilians live in Japan, as the Japanese government (like the French government, for example) does not officially collect data on the ethnicity of its citizens. Japanese statistics record Brazilian citizens who have acquired Japanese citizenship only as Japanese. According to official Japanese data, as of December 2025, 210,014 Brazilian citizens resided in Japan. According to the Civil Affairs Bureau of the Ministry of Justice of Japan, 59,679 people underwent the naturalization procedure between 2019 and 2025. Of the top ten countries by the number of naturalized people, Brazilian citizens ranked third between 2019 and 2021, and fourth between 2022 and 2025. Between 2019 and 2025, 3,009 Brazilian citizens received Japanese citizenship (5.04% of all those who received Japanese citizenship during this period).

== Integration and community ==
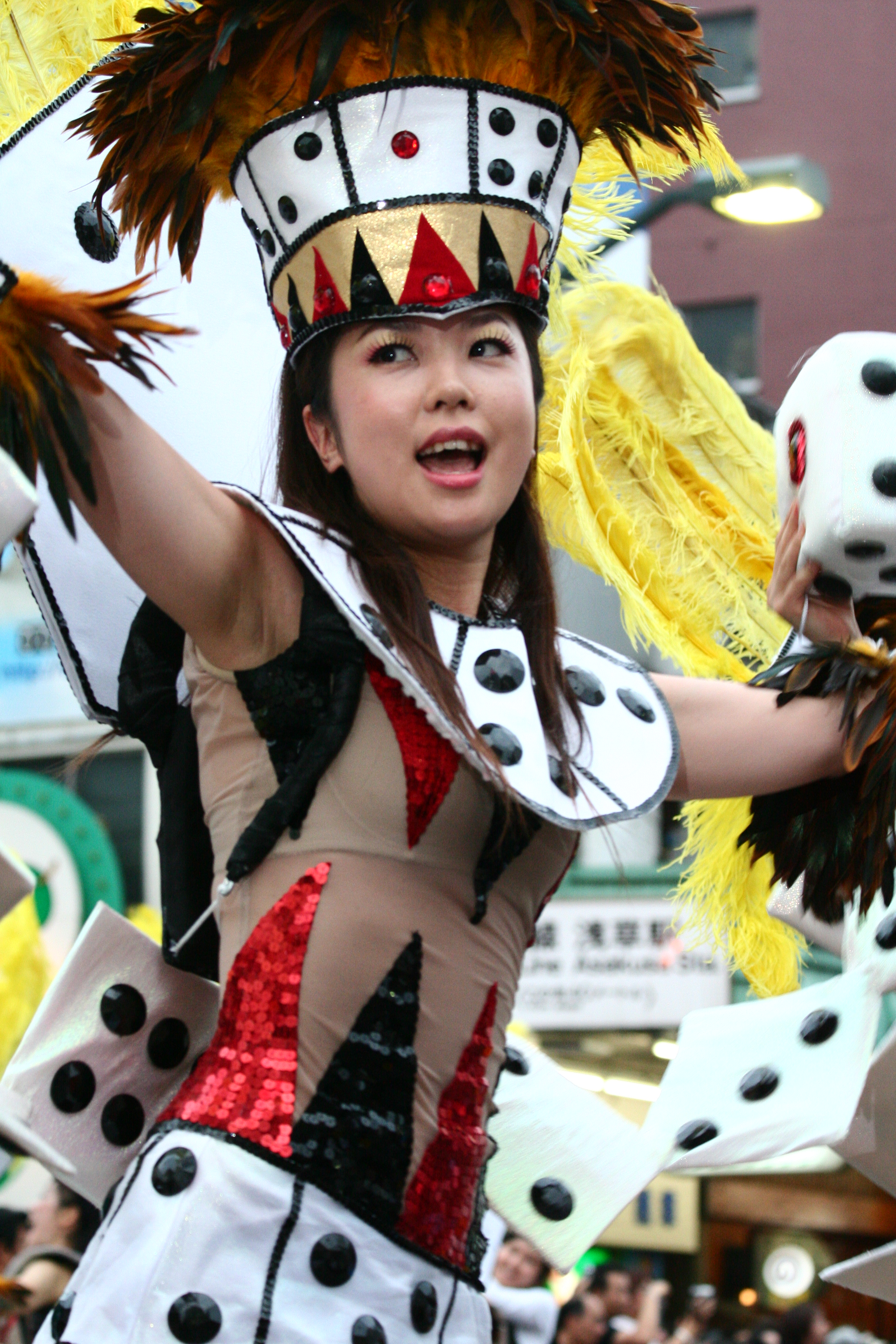
A reveler at the annual Asakusa Samba Carnival

Brazilians of Japanese descent in particular find themselves the targets of discrimination; some local Japanese scorn them as the descendants of "social dropouts" who emigrated from Japan because they were "giving up" on Japanese society, whereas others perceive them more as objects of pity than scorn, people who were forced into emigrating by unfortunate circumstances beyond their control such as birth order or lack of opportunities in rural areas. The largest numbers are concentrated in Toyota, Ōizumi, where it is estimated that up to 15% of the population speaks Portuguese as their native language, and Hamamatsu, which contains the largest population of Brazilians in Japan. In some of these communities, Brazilians have taken on active roles in local residence councils to help bridge social, cultural, and linguistic gaps between Japanese-speaking and Portuguese-speaking residents. A number of NGOs have also been established by Brazilians to help improve integration and educational opportunities for residents. Brazilians are not particularly concentrated in larger cities such as Tokyo or Osaka. Brazilians tend to be more concentrated where there are large factories, as most who first moved to Japan tended to work in automobile plants and similar sectors.

Brazilian population by prefecture	2009	2014	2019	2025
Aichi Prefecture	67,162	48,220	61,435	60,406
Shizuoka Prefecture	42,625	27,126	30,486	31,489
Gunma Prefecture	15,324	11,879	12,894	13,995
Mie Prefecture	18,667	12,689	13,775	13,883
Gifu Prefecture	17,078	10,228	12,218	12,349
Kanagawa Prefecture	13,091	8,550	9,161	9,451
Shiga Prefecture	11,384	7,813	9,455	9,267
Saitama Prefecture	12,301	7,653	7,356	7,116
Ibaraki Prefecture	10,200	6,048	5,914	5,704
Nagano Prefecture	10,938	5,397	5,298	4,615

As of 2004, the cities with under 1,000,000 total inhabitants with the largest Brazilian Nikkei populations were Hamamatsu (12,766), Toyohashi (10,293), Toyota (6,266), Okazaki (4,500), Suzuka (4,084), Kani (3,874), Komaki (3,629), Isesaki (3,372), Ōta (3,245), and Ōgaki (3,129). The cities with 1,000,000 or more inhabitants had low percentages of Brazilians.

In the late 2000s, it was estimated that each year, 4,000 Brazilian immigrants returned to Brazil from Japan.

=== Brazilian identity in Japan ===
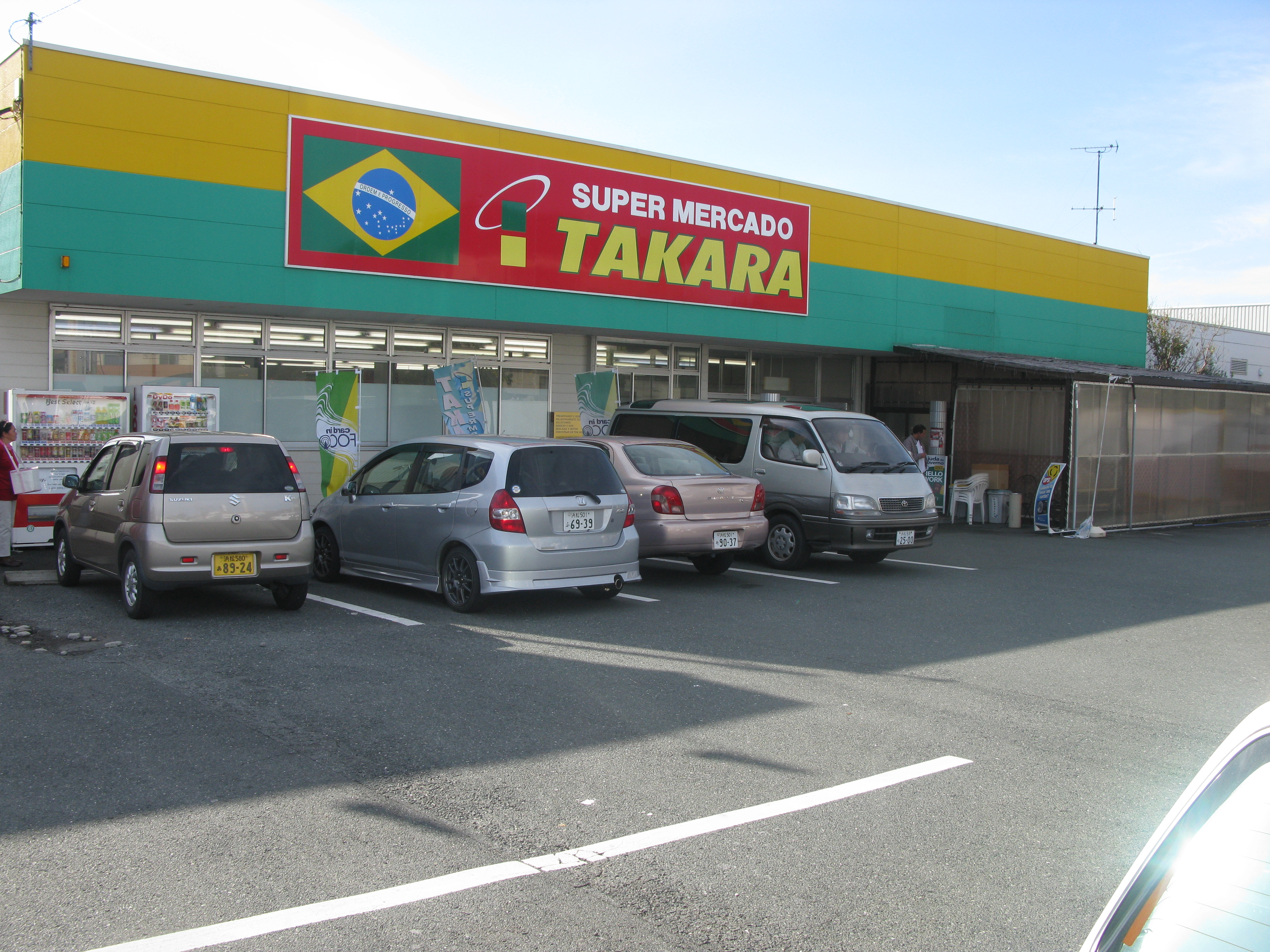
Super Mercado Takara, a Brazilian supermarket in Hamamatsu, Shizuoka

Many Brazilians of Japanese descent face discrimination in both Brazil and Japan. In Brazil, they are often discriminated against because of their Japanese appearance and heritage; in Japan, they are looked down on because their customs, cultural behavior, and Japanese language proficiency are not up to Japan's native standard. In Japan, many Japanese Brazilians suffer prejudice because they do not know how to speak Japanese correctly. Despite their Japanese appearance and heritage, many Japanese Brazilians in Japan are culturally very Brazilian, often only speaking Brazilian Portuguese, and treated as foreigners.

Academic studies report that many Japanese Brazilians felt (and were often treated as) Japanese in Brazil. But when they move to Japan, they realize their strong feelings for their Brazilian background. In Brazil, many Japanese Brazilians rarely listened to samba or participated in carnival parades. However, once in Japan, Japanese Brazilians often promote carnivals and samba festivities in the Japanese cities to demonstrate their pride in being Brazilian.

The Brazilian influence in Japan is growing. Tokyo has the largest carnival parade outside of Brazil itself. Portuguese is the third most spoken foreign language in Japan, after Chinese and Korean, and among the most studied languages by students in the country. In Ōizumi, Gunma, it is estimated that 15% of the residents speak Portuguese as their native language. Japan has two newspapers in the Portuguese language, besides radio and television stations spoken in that language. The Brazilian fashion and Bossa nova music are also popular among Japanese.

== Socioeconomics ==
Japanese Brazilians have benefited tremendously from migrating to Brazil. Anthropologist Takeyuki Tsuda coined the term "positive minority" to describe Japanese Brazilians' socioeconomic status in Brazil. The majority of Brazilians with Japanese descent have high socioeconomic status despite their inactivity in politics and smaller demographics. They were viewed in Brazil as a “model minority,” meaning that were looked up upon by other Brazilian natives with their good education and middle class economic status. When Japanese Brazilians migrated back to Japan, many of them faced drastic changes to their social and ethnic status. Many Japanese Brazilian immigrants took over jobs that were viewed as low skilled, high labor, and dirty to Japanese society due to an inability to speak fluently in Japanese. Despite the negative stigma, many of these blue-collar jobs in Japan provided higher pay than white collar jobs in Brazil. This motivated many Japanese Brazilians to migrate back to Japan.

== Religion ==
With Catholicism widespread in Brazil, in the early days of Brazilian migration to Japan, Catholic churches often served as spaces for migrant gatherings and socialization. After World War II, many first generation Japanese migrants encouraged their offspring to convert to the Catholic religion for social and economic opportunities in Brazil. However, the growth of secular Brazilian community organizations, media, and businesses in Japan has taken over part of this role from the churches. Migrants, including Brazilians, make up perhaps as much as half of the total Catholic population in Japan. However, differences in culture and even religious tradition have made it difficult to integrate Brazilian migrants into native Japanese Catholic congregations. For example, in the Saitama Diocese, although Japanese and Portuguese-speaking congregations share the same church building, exchanges between them are almost non-existent, and the two groups hold ceremonies, celebrations, and other events separately. There is also a growing number of Pentecostal denominations in Japan led by migrants from Brazil.

Japanese new religions see the stream of Brazilian migration as an opportunity to gain new converts. The Church of World Messianity (SKK, for Sekai Kyūsei Kyō) is one Japanese new religion which has had a strong following in Brazil; by 1998 they had 300,000 members in Brazil, 97% of non-Japanese background. With the increase in Brazilian migration to Japan, by 2006, a total of 21 Johrei centres had engaged Brazilian SKK missionaries in order to provide Portuguese-language orientation to Brazilian migrants. They have been somewhat more successful than Catholics in promoting integration between the Brazilian and Japanese parts of their congregations.

== Employment ==
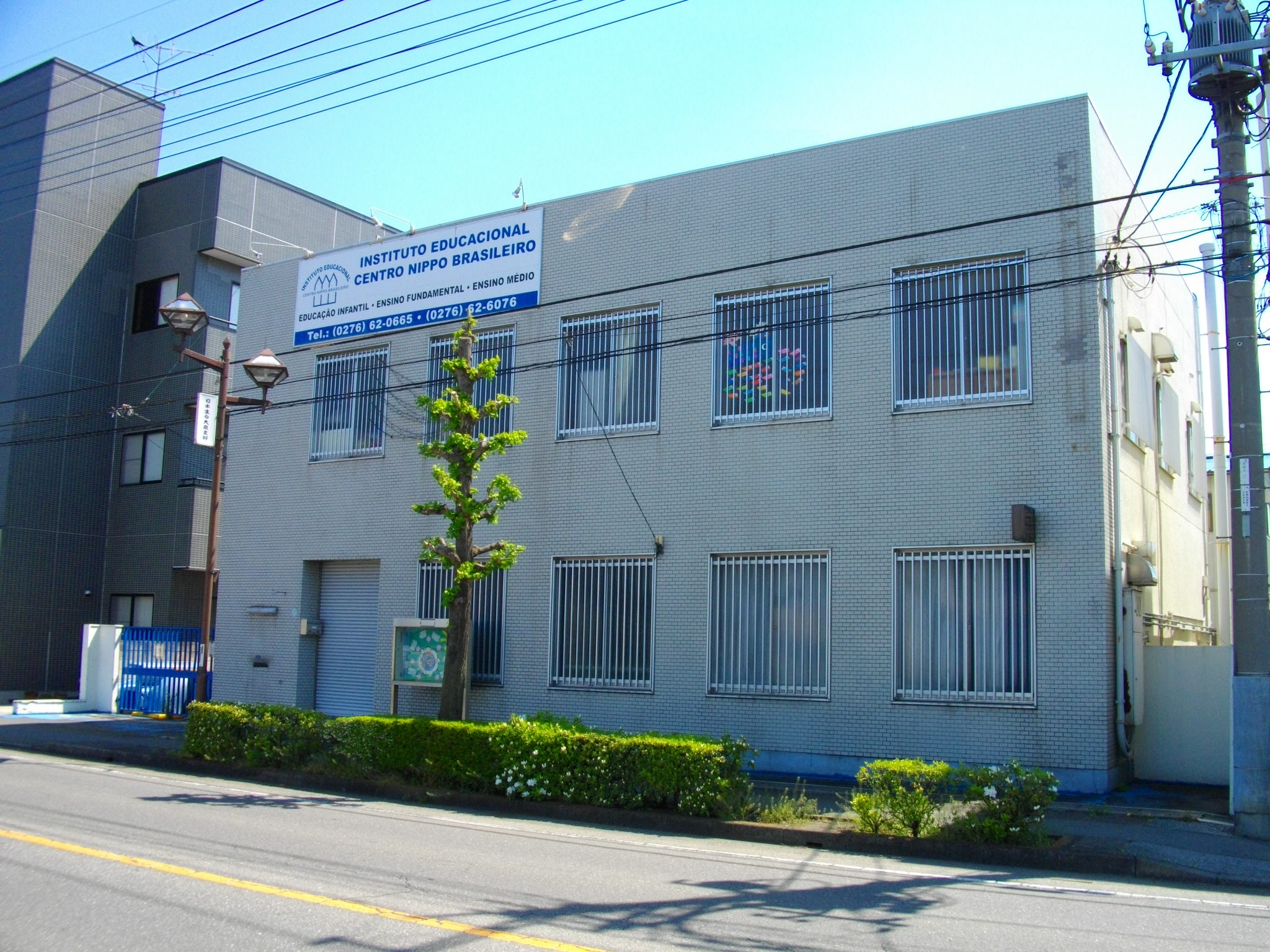
Instituto Educacional Centro Nippo Brasileiro (Japanese Brazilian Center Educational Institute) in Oizumi, Gunma

Brazilians tend to take jobs considered undesirable by native Japanese, such as working in electronics factories and the automotive sector. Most Brazilians go to Japan attracted by the recruiting agencies in conjunction with the factories. Many Brazilians are subjected to hours of exhausting work, earning a small salary by Japanese standards. Nevertheless, in 2002, Brazilians living in Japan sent US$2.5 billion to Brazil.

== Education ==
As of 2005 there were 40,000 Brazilian children of school age in Japan. By 2008 the number of Brazilian school age children was almost 33,500. As of 2005 8,000 study at Japanese schools, and by 2008 that number was about 10,000. The children of Dekasegi Brazilians encounter difficulties in Japanese schools. As of 2005 15,000 study at one of the 63 private Brazilian schools. The Ministry of Education of Brazil approved 36 of them.

As of 2005 17,000 school-aged Brazilian children were not attending school. As of 2008 thousands of Brazilian children are out of school in Japan. Adriana Stock of the BBC stated that the school fees were too high for many Brazilian parents.

Nonetheless, since the onset of reverse migration, many Japanese Brazilians who are not of mixed ancestry have also endeavored to learn Japanese at native levels. However, while such cases like these are high, the statistics fail to show a high rate of such Japanese Brazilians succeeding to integrate into Japanese society because the vast majority of such people end up achieving Japanese citizenship naturalization. Once they obtain Japanese citizenship, regardless of whether or not the Japanese citizen is still considered to be a citizen of Brazil in the eyes of the Brazilian government, Japanese statistics record such people as only Japanese. If they pursue university in Japan, they must take exams alongside other native Japanese citizens. Thus, even while Japan has many Japanese Brazilians who are completely bilingual, with Japanese statistics failing to count Japanese Brazilians who have since naturalized, such Japanese Brazilians are not given the credit statistically for the fact that Japanese society has placed a much higher bar for them to integrate into Japanese society than other non-Japanese foreigners, and have since successfully integrated into Japanese society both culturally and linguistically.

== Notable people ==
- Adriana, model
- Carolina Kaneda, model
- Gilson Yamada, actor
- Kanako Minami, singer
- Kelly, model
- Viviane Ono, model
- Kana Oya, model
- Ryūkō Gō, rikishi
- Carlos Ghosn, businessman
- Kaisei Ichirō, rikishi
- Augusto Akio, skateboarder
- Yuu Kamiya, novelist
- Wagner Lopes, football player
- Erikson Noguchipinto, football player
- Ruy Ramos, football player
- Ademir Santos, football player
- Alessandro Santos, football player
- Marcos Sugiyama, volleyball player
- Marcus Tulio Tanaka, football player
- Goiti Yamauchi, mixed martial arts fighter
- Gabriel Kazu, football player

== Media ==
- International Press (newspaper) - Established by Yoshio Muranaga in 1991. In 1996 its weekly circulation was 55,000.
- IPC (television station)
- Tudo Bem (magazine)

== See also ==
- Brazil–Japan relations
- Fushūgaku
- Japanese Brazilians
