= Brazilian schools in Japan =

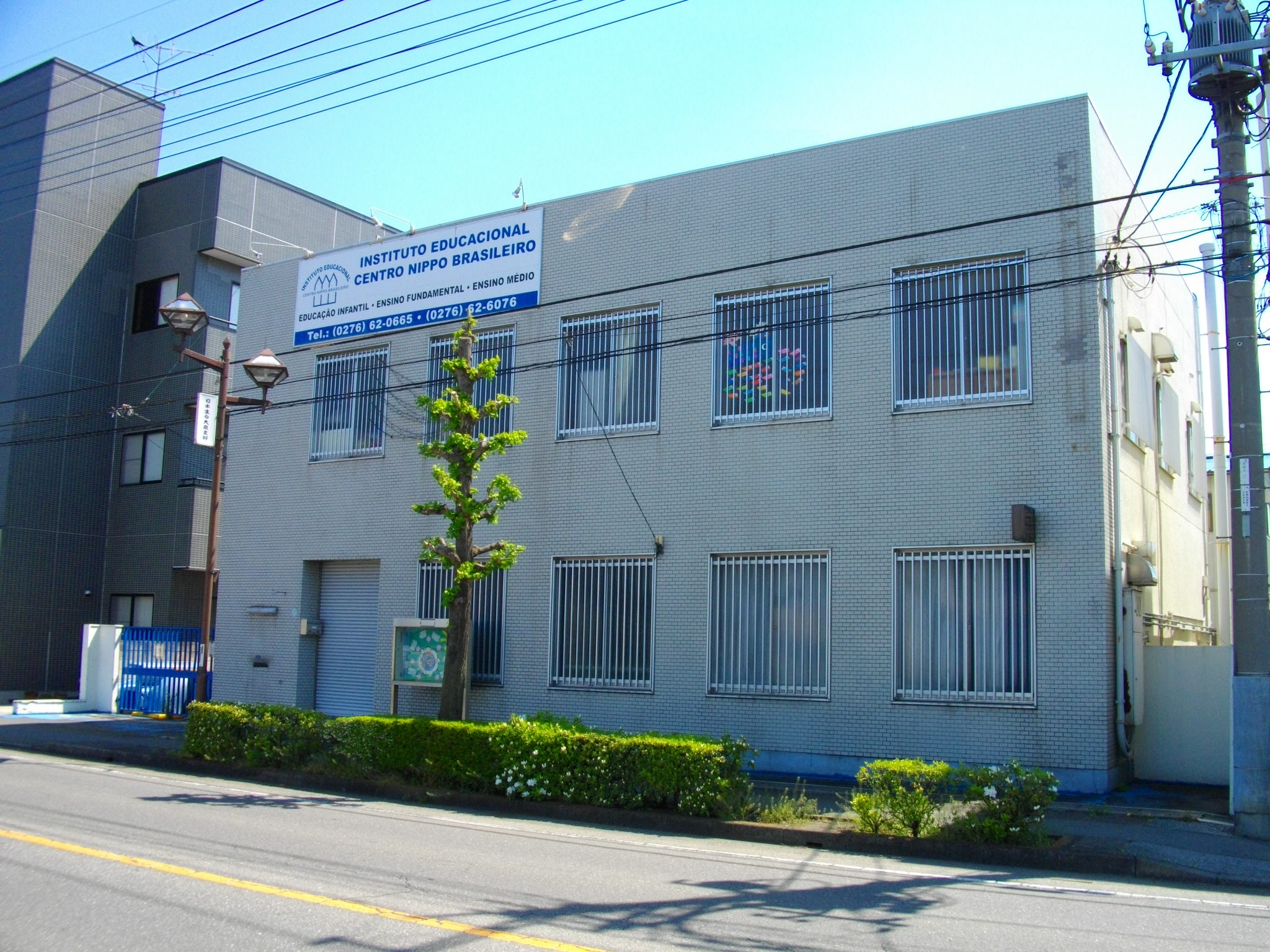
Instituto Educacional Centro Nippo Brasileiro (Nippaku Gakuen) in Oizumi, Gunma

Brazilian schools in Japan (ブラジル学校, Burajiru gakkō) are schools that specifically cater to Brazilians living in Japan. Many students who attend such schools are Fushūgaku (不就学), or children who do not attend public schooling. This is either due to parents wanting their children to attend school in their native language, or because they have little experience with or knowledge of Japanese culture or language.

In 1995 there were five Brazilian schools in Japan. In 2008 there were about 100 Brazilian schools in the country. According to the Japanese Ministry of Education, there are more than 80 such schools across Japan as of 2009, 53 of which have received official approval by the Brazilian government. Between 30 and 200 students are enrolled at each of these schools. In addition to these, it is likely there are many more unlicensed schools in operation.

== Tuition ==
The tuition fee for these schools can reach about 30 thousand yen per month for one student.

The 2008 financial crisis put many schools in a difficult position. Since they receive no assistance from the state and rely completely on tuition fees to operate, the schools are struggling since unemployed parents are unable to pay for tuition, with numerous schools forced to close.

== Facilities ==
Most schools operate from small rented properties, with no grounds or gymnasiums.

Some schools operate school buses for their students.

== See also ==
- List of Brazilian schools in Japan
- Brazilians in Japan
- Japanese Brazilian
- Fushūgaku
- Education in Brazil
