= Hip Hop Caucus =

Non-profit in the US

The Hip Hop Caucus (HHC) is a national, non-profit organization in the United States, which aims to promote political activism for young U.S. voters using hip-hop music and culture.

The group's programs are intended to promote social and political equality in the areas of economics, education, health care, housing, the environment and social justice. The group is a member of the Black Leadership Forum and the Leadership Conference on Civil and Human Rights.

Rev. Lennox Yearwood Jr., President & CEO of the Hip Hop Caucus is a former co-creator of P. Diddy's "Vote or Die" campaign of 2004. In 2003 and 2004 he was the Political and Grassroots Director for Russell Simmons' Hip Hop Summit Action Network, as well as a Senior Consultant to Jay-Z's Citizen Change "Voice Your Choice" campaign.

== Campaigns and events ==
=== Respect My Vote ===
Respect My Vote! is a voter mobilization campaign that aims to educate, register and mobilize young people of color between the ages of 18 and 39 who live in urban communities, do not attend college, people with felony records who are unaware of their voting rights, and students at historically black colleges and universities.

In 2008, the Hip Hop Caucus and the hip hop artist T.I. launched the "Respect My Vote" youth voting campaign. There was a higher number of young voters at the 2008 election, subsequent to higher turnout seen in 2004 and 2006. Analysis of the 2008 electorate showed that while overall numbers of voters did not increase as dramatically as expected, the composition of the electorate was notably different, with increased participation seen among minority youth voters, the Hip Hop Caucus' target demographic.

==== One Vote Day ====
The Hip Hop Caucus' Respect My Vote! Campaign, along with Radio One registered more than 30,000 voters during its national “One Vote Day” voter registration drive on September 30, 2008. Sixteen cities across the country participated in events aimed at mass voter registration. Radio One stations broadcast live from central locations in each of the participating cities urging unregistered voters to attend their local registration site to register onsite. Artists such as Nelly and Raheem DeVaughn helped draw large crowds to registration stations, allowing Hip Hop Caucus volunteers to register voters.

==== Respect My Vote! National Bus Tour ====
During the 2008 general elections The Respect My Vote! campaign traveled to 20 cities on the “Respect My Vote! Get Out The Vote Bus Tour” to encourage voting by distributing pledge cards and having celebrities discuss the value of voting. The tour included the largest ever Get Out the Vote Rally at Florida A&M University.

=== Green 2 Live ===
Green 2 Live aims to raise awareness within low-income communities of color about what they believe to be the impacts of climate change on their communities, and train leaders in sustainable energy activism, for which the Hip Hop Caucus created "Green the City" and "Green the Block" campaigns. Events have included the "Hip Hop Caucus Clean Energy Now Tour", with the Alliance for Climate Protection and the "Historically Black College and University Tour" with the National Wildlife Federation

==== Green the Block ====
"Green the Block" is a national campaign and coalition created by the Hip Hop Caucus and Green For All. This campaign is aimed at promoting activism for sustainable energy in low-income communities of color.

The campaign, which was launched at the White House on President Barack Obama's birthday (August 4, 2009), aims to educate and encourage people to take better care of the environment.

Green the Block has helped organize over 100 community service projects in cities around the U.S. including Memphis, Tennessee, Oakland, California, Washington, D.C., and Miami.

The campaign hosted a 16-city "Campus Consciousness Tour" featuring hip-hop artist Drake to encourage college students to join sustainable energy efforts.

==== Green the City ====
Launched in 2010 as a joint campaign between the National Conference of Black Mayors and the Hip Hop Caucus Education Fund, Green the City works with African American mayors and city residents to promote activism for sustainable energy.

June 28–30, 2010 the Hip Hop Caucus Education Fund and the National Conference of Black Mayors hosted the "Green the City Advocacy Summit" that brought 25 mayors to Washington, DC, to attend a "Green the City" campaign and to meet with members of the United States Congress, Obama administration officials, and heads of the United States Environmental Protection Agency to advocate for sustainable energy in the U.S.

=== March on Gretna ===
On November 7, 2005, Rev. Yearwood led the first post-Hurricane Katrina march in Gretna, Louisiana to protest the alleged racial profiling of survivors. The march attracted 150 participants, including many displaced residents. As a result of this effort, police officers were convicted of denying human rights to African-American families displaced by Hurricane Katrina.

=== Gulf Coast Renewal ===
The Hip Hop Caucus implemented the Gulf Coast Renewal campaign after the disaster of Hurricane Katrina. The campaign focused on the affected areas of the Gulf Coast including Louisiana, Mississippi, and Alabama. Rev. Yearwood and the Hip Hop Caucus organized partnerships with national and grassroots organizations to advocate for the rights of Hurricane Katrina survivors.

After public mobilization, two marches in Washington, DC, testimony to Congress and other work by the group, the Federal Emergency Management Agency ceased preemptive temporary housing evictions of Katrina Survivors. To continue addressing the issue of displaced citizens in New Orleans and Iraq, due to the war the "We Care" concert was organized with Amnesty International.

In 2005 the Institute for Policy Studies awarded the Hip Hop Caucus their Letelier-Moffitt Human Rights Award for the Gulf Coast Renewal Campaign, an annual award given by the Institute for Policy Studies to those helping to advance human rights.

=== Stop the Violence in New Orleans ===
Fifteen months after Hurricane Katrina, the Hip Hop Caucus hosted the "Stop the Violence" town hall meeting at McDonogh No. 35 Senior High School in New Orleans, LA. Hip-Hop artists and community activists gathered with youth, parents and other citizens, aiming to address the issue of gun violence in the city. Panelists included rappers Doug E. Fresh, Slim Thug and many local rappers, along with President Kenneth Barnes Sr. of ROOT Inc. (Reaching Out to Others Together), community activist Ronald Coleman, and Councilmen James Carter. Audience members and panelists discussed possible steps to be taken to put an end to the violence in the streets of New Orleans.

=== Enough is Enough ===
In 2007, the Hip Hop Caucus began to address the issues of violence, alleged police brutality, and hate crimes. On November 17, 2007, the Hip Hop Caucus organized a rally called "Enough is Enough, Stop Police Brutality and Hate Crimes" on the National Mall in Washington, D.C. This rally aimed to bring attention to the cases of Sean Bell, Megan Williams, Martin Lee Anderson, Deonte Rawlings and other young African-American victims of alleged police brutality and hate crimes.

=== Make Hip-Hop Not War ===
The Hip Hop Caucus launched the "Make Hip-Hop Not War" campaign in 2007 aiming to promote activism in the anti-war movement for young people. The Hip Hop Caucus along with hip-hop artists and Iraq War veterans, campaigned in 16 cities through a national bus tour. The tour consisted of rallies and round table discussions, intended to inform young people about the war in Afghanistan and the Iraq War, and to encourage them to speak out against war. This campaign also worked to lobby Congress to stop funding the war in Iraq. The "Make Hip-Hop Not War" campaign received the Walter E. Fauntroy No FEAR Institute Award on May 14, 2008 for its efforts to speak out against the government and war-supporting institutions.

=== Shut it Down, Stop the Torture ===
Hip Hop Caucus and Amnesty International organized the "Shut It Down, Stop the Torture" event in Washington, D.C. to advocate the closure of the U.S. Guantánamo Bay detention camp in Cuba. The informational briefing and concert was intended to raise awareness on human rights and the events that took place at Guantanamo Bay. The event was held on Juneteenth (June 19, 2007), in order to symbolically link the emancipation of slaves in the U.S. and the current situation at Guantanamo Bay.

=== Hip-Hop Help Haiti ===
After the 2010 Haiti earthquake that claimed the lives of hundreds of thousands of people, the Hip Hop Caucus created HipHopHelpHaiti.org, a network aimed at helping people to take action in response to the crisis. The 500 member online network is updated periodically and provides information on people can be involved and provide assistance to the Haitian population.

=== HOME ===
On 14 November 2014, the ensemble announced plans to release a full-length album entitled HOME. Scheduled for release via iTunes on 2 December 2014, the albums features songs from prominent artists such as Elle Varner, Ne-Yo and Crystal Waters. The first single from the album, "Mercy Mercy Me" by recording artist Antonique Smith has been released.

== Discography ==
- HOME (2014)
