= Children of the Ghetto =

Children of the Ghetto or Child of the Ghetto may refer to:

== Literature ==
- Children of the Ghetto (novel) (Children of the Ghetto: A Study of a Peculiar People), an 1892 novel by Israel Zangwill, and its 1899 dramatisation
- Children of the Ghetto: My Name Is Adam, a 2016 novel by Elias Khoury

== Film ==
- Children of the Ghetto (film), a 1915 American film

== Music ==
- Children of the Ghetto, a 2006 album by Winston Jarrett
- "Children of the Ghetto", a song by Dave Liebman from the 1976 album Light'n Up, Please!
- "Children of the Ghetto", a song by South Park Mexican from the 1995 album Hillwood
- "Children of the Ghetto", a song by The Real Thing from the 1977 album 4 from 8, included as a b-side to the 1979 single "Can You Feel the Force?"
  - "Children of the Ghetto", a version by Philip Bailey from the 1984 album Chinese Wall
  - "Children of the Ghetto", a version by Courtney Pine featuring Susaye Greene from the 1986 album Journey to the Urge Within
  - "Children of the Ghetto", a version by Klaus Waldeck on the 1988 album Balance of the Force
  - "Children of the Ghetto", a version by Mary J. Blige on her 2002 No More Drama Tour
  - "Children of the Ghetto", a version by Crystal Waters on the 2014 Hip Hop Caucus compilation album Home

== See also ==
- Chilldrin of da Ghetto, 1999 self-titled album by Chilldrin of da Ghetto
- A Child of the Ghetto, a 1910 silent film
- Child of the Ghetto, a 2001 album by G. Dep
