= Eastern Christian School Association =

Coordinates: 40.945637°N 74.180587°W

Location
- Northern New Jersey United States

District information
- Type: Private Christian
- Motto: Engaging the Mind, Nurturing the Spirit, Transforming the World
- Grades: Pre-K-12
- Established: 1892
- Accreditation: Middle States
- Schools: 3

Students and staff
- Students: 909
- Teachers: 63.5
- District mascot: Eagles
- Colors: Blue and Gold

Other information
- Website: www.easternchristian.org

Eastern Christian School is a private Christian school located on three campuses in Northern New Jersey. Eastern Christian Elementary School (ECES), Eastern Christian Middle School (ECMS), and Eastern Christian High School (ECHS) are all part of Eastern Christian School. Eastern Christian is home to students from middle and northern NJ as well as southern NY. EC also offers a one to four year middle and high school program for F-1 Visa Students.

Eastern Christian currently has 909 enrolled students and a student–teacher ratio of 11:1. The school's student body is 57% White, 15% Asian, 13% Hispanic or Latino, 8% Black and 7% Multiracial.

== Academics ==
Eastern Christian is the oldest and largest Christian day school in the New York Metropolitan area. It is also affiliated with Christian Schools International, which includes 425 school systems in the United States and Canada. The faculty is New Jersey State certified with an average teaching experience of 15 years, with almost half having earned advanced degrees.

=== High School ===
Accredited by the Middle States Association of Schools and Colleges and approved by the New Jersey Department of Education, Eastern Christian High School offers a college preparatory program and general and business programs for students going immediately to careers. Instructors teach their subjects from a Christian perspective. The "Faith in Action" program is one such project that requires students who enter High School to volunteer time for community service.

Highlights:

- Four years of pre-college preparation in English, Math, Science and Social Studies
- Project Acceleration partnership with Seton Hall University. Students have access to classes bearing 41 college credits while enrolled in high school.
- Elective courses in Business, Art, Bible, Social Studies, English, and Science
- Outstanding music programs: Concert Band, Orchestra, Choir, and Honors Choir
- Resource Room for students who need individual assistance
- 40-minute non-graded learning period (SOAR) 4 days per week for non-traditional learning, remediation, and student leadership opportunities

=== Middle School ===
The Middle School is the bridge between elementary and high school. Here, 4th and 5th grade students continue in an upper elementary model. The upper elementary program is characterized by an integrated Humanities program and Science & Math experience in 4th and 5th grade. Students in 6th, 7th and 8th grade have a departmentalized structure, providing instructors who are teaching in their areas of expertise from a Christian perspective.

Highlights:

- Daily devotions and weekly chapel/small groups
- Service learning program (Make a Difference Program)
- Upper Elementary Program in Grades 4 and 5 (half day Humanities, half day Math and Science)
- Departmentalized instruction in grades 6–8
- Advanced classes in algebra and geometry
- Resource Room to assist students who need individual help
- Music program offering Band, Choir and Orchestra with multiple formal and community-based performances and recitals
- Media Center
- Competitive athletic teams in Soccer, Basketball, Volleyball, Cross Country, and Track
- 6th–8th grade 1:1 chromebook policy. Grades 4–5 use classroom sets.
- Full integration of the Google Apps for Education into middle school systems for student creation, collaboration and production

=== Elementary School ===
The Eastern Christian Elementary School offers academic education with a spiritual dimension intended to complement the teaching of both home and church.

Highlights:

- Daily devotions and Bible lessons, weekly chapel services
- 90 minutes of daily Language Arts instruction including phonics, reading, writing, spelling and speaking
- 60 minutes of daily math instruction
- Cutting edge technology for student use including computers, iPads, Chromebooks and Promethean boards in classrooms
- Comprehensive music program for Preschool–3rd grade
- Weekly specials classes in grades K–3 include Physical Education/Health, Music, Art, Computers and Library
- Before school and after school programs

== Extracurricular activities ==
=== High School ===
The Eastern Christian High School offers an athletics program with opportunities for both individual and team participation. This program intends to teach Christian values, such as sacrifice, diligence, perseverance, respect, and putting the good of the group ahead of what is good for oneself.

While 60% of students are involved in the athletic program, ECHS also offers a range of other activities to meet student interests. These include fencing, fly fishing, musical production, astronomy, robotics, gardening and more.

ECHS also offers 13 music and art electives, 3 music ensembles and 2 theater productions each year.

=== Middle School ===
The middle school campus offers a variety of fall, winter and spring athletic teams to encourage younger athletes to begin their journey as an Eastern Christian Eagle.

Students find friends and mentors throughout the EC community, including through team sports, Advisory Program, and annual events such as Robot Fight Night, Homecoming, Winter Carnival, and Hands Dirty Day. A variety of after school school clubs give students room to explore their interests and cultivate new skills, including STEAM, coding, lego engineering and baking.

=== Elementary School ===
Elementary School students at Eastern Christian receive regular special instruction in Music, Library, STEAM, Art and Physical Education. Beginning in second grade, they may opt in to an additional violin program. After school club offerings range from sports to art to dancing and more.

==== Notable alumni ====
- Jonas Brothers, Kevin and Joe and Hailey Rhode Baldwin attended the school.
- Bethany Joy Galeotti (born 1981 as Bethany Joy Lenz), singer/songwriter, actress
- Jon Egan and Dan Egan, members of the band Desperation Band
- Peter Kreeft (born 1937), philosopher
- Alexander Noyes (born 1986), drummer for the band Honor Society
- Katie Sagona (born 1989), actress
- Antonique Smith, actress/singer best known for her starring role as Mimi in Jonathan Larson's Broadway production of Rent and starred as Faith Evans in the film Notorious.
