= Lennox Yearwood =

American minister and activist

The Reverend Lennox Yearwood, Jr
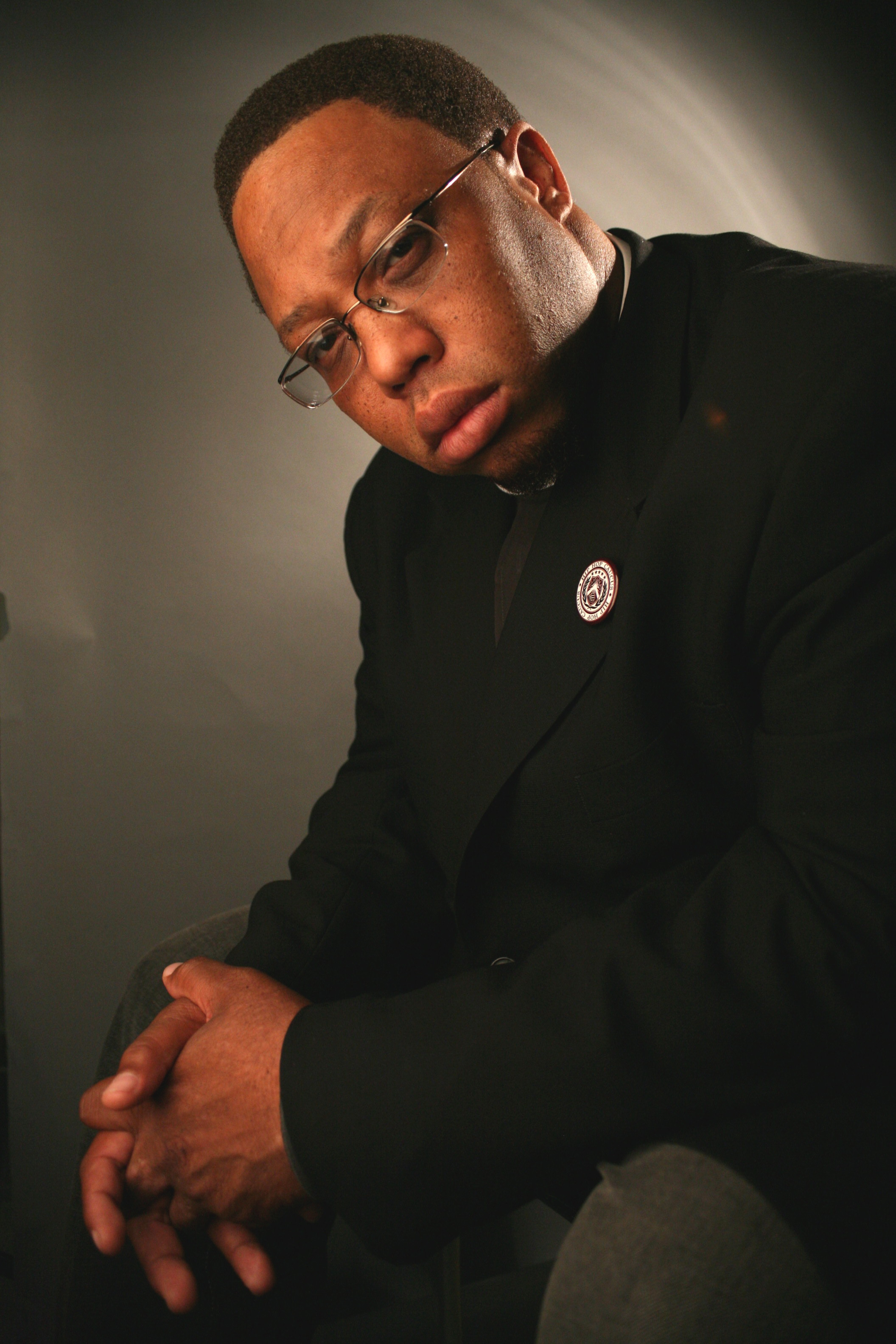
- Church: Church of God in Christ

Personal details
- Born: Shreveport, Louisiana
- Occupation: Activist
- Education: University of the District of Columbia; Howard University

Lennox Yearwood Jr. is a Pentecostal minister and community activist. Yearwood currently serves as president of the Hip Hop Caucus, a national nonprofit, nonpartisan organization that empowers young people to participate in elections, policymaking and service projects. Yearwood has led or been involved in a number of high-profile campaigns to engage young voters, as well as working on human rights issues in the Gulf Coast region after Hurricane Katrina.

== Early life and education ==
Yearwood was born in Shreveport, Louisiana. He earned his undergraduate degree from the University of the District of Columbia in 1998 and received a M.Div. degree from Howard University in May 2002. He was ordained in the Church of God in Christ shortly after his graduation. Yearwood was the student government president at both schools and was issued an honorary doctorate from Saint Paul University in May 2011. He also served in the U.S. Air Force Reserve as an officer and chaplain.

== Early activism ==
Yearwood was a co-creator of the 2004 campaign "Vote or Die" with Sean Combs. He was the Political and Grassroots Director for Russell Simmons' Hip Hop Summit in 2003 and 2004, and functioned as Senior Consultant to Jay Z's "Voice Your Choice" campaign. He served as a Senior Consultant for P. Diddy's Citizen Change, where he provided a 50-state strategy for engaging the hip hop generation in community-building dialogues.

During the 2004 Presidential election, Yearwood, Russell Simmons, and Jonathan Lewis created the "Hip Hop Team Vote Bus Tour." Yearwood is also the founder of Hip Hop Voices, a project of Voices for Working Families (AFL-CIO).

=== H.R. 2206 protest ===
Yearwood and others protested the United States Senate passage of the U.S. Troop Readiness, Veterans' Care, Katrina Recovery, and Iraq Accountability Appropriations Act, 2007 on April 26, 2007. Yearwood was arrested with thirteen other protesters in the Hart Senate Office Building

=== Guantanamo Bay ===
Yearwood organized "Shut It Down," a hip hop concert at the 9:30 Club in Washington, DC, calling for the end of torture at the Guantanamo Bay detainment camp and for the camp's closure. The concert featured Dead Prez and several other hip hop artists. Amnesty International and the ACLU were partners in the event.

Yearwood at the 2026 New York Film Festival

== Hip Hop Caucus ==
Yearwood is the president and CEO of the Hip Hop Caucus, founded September 11, 2004, on the premise that the hip hop generation is uniquely qualified to address human-rights for the 21st century. Since its founding, the Hip Hop Caucus has developed a database of approximately 700,000 members and has field teams in 48 cities across 30 states.

=== Respect My Vote! ===
In 2008, "Respect My Vote!", a national voter engagement campaign, was led by the Hip Hop Caucus and spokesperson, multi-platinum, Grammy Award winning rapper, T.I. together with celebrities such as Keyshia Cole, T-Pain, Young Jeezy and others. The campaign successfully registered voters in 12 states and executed a 20 city Bus Tour to Get Out the Vote the month before the 2008 presidential election.

In 2010, Yearwood and the Hip Hop Caucus revived the "Respect My Vote!" campaign to engage new and young voters in the mid-term elections.

=== Make Hip Hop Not War ===
During March and April 2007 the Hip Hop Caucus undertook a sixteen city "Make Hip Hop Not War" national bus tour with hip hop artists, Iraq War veterans, youth leaders, peace and security experts, and members of Congress. Events, rallies and roundtables were held in each city to educate audiences on the costs of the wars in Afghanistan and Iraq, and to motivate young people to take action and have their voices heard. The continuation of the "Make Hip Hop Not War" campaign throughout 2007 focused on calling for Congress to de-fund the War in Iraq; raising awareness about the costs of the wars in Iraq and Afghanistan for communities in the USA; and exposing the plight of Iraqi refugees in the Middle East as a result of the war.

=== Arrest at Armed Services hearing ===
Yearwood was arrested by Capitol Hill police outside of a hearing of the House Armed Services Committee on September 10, 2007, and charged with disorderly conduct and assault on a police officer. According to Sgt. Kimberly Schneider, spokeswoman for the Capitol Police, Yearwood was stopped from entering the room after allegedly attempting to cut in front of people waiting to get in. "What he tried to do was jump to the front of the line. He was told he couldn't do that," Schneider said. "And he pretty much charged at the officers to get past them into the room, after he was told not to." In a press release from the Hip Hop Caucus, Yearwood said that he was prevented from entering the hearing because he was wearing a button that said "I love the people of Iraq." In the press release he called his arrest an example of "democracy while black." UPI reports that the video being circulated on the Internet "does not seem to show an assault."

Yearwood was treated at George Washington University Hospital "for injuries to his ankle" according to Liz Havstad, a spokeswoman for the Hip Hop Caucus. In an interview three days later on the Democracy Now! news program, Yearwood told Amy Goodman that he asked Capitol Police if he could leave the line to do a radio interview and was told okay. When he returned to line, he said, he and two other activists were singled out and told they would not be able to enter, and when he tried to find out why, he was arrested. In the interview Yearwood claimed he had torn ligaments in his leg during the incident, and said he was on crutches.

=== The Gulf Coast Renewal Campaign ===
Yearwood is known for his activist work as the National Director of the Gulf Coast Renewal Campaign, in which he organized a coalition of national and grassroots organizations to advocate for the rights of Hurricane Katrina survivors. On September 19, 2005, David Banner joined forces with fellow artists and Yearwood for "From the Hill to Hood." The event was held in New York City to raise money for survivors of Hurricane Katrina. Yearwood led the first march in New Orleans after Hurricane Katrina in November 2005, to protest the racial profiling of survivors in the days after the storm. The march led to convictions of officers who denied basic human rights to African-American families. The following year the Gulf Coast Renewal Campaign successfully pushed back FEMA’s preemptive temporary housing evictions of Katrina survivors, through public mobilization, two marches in Washington, DC, testimony to Congress, and a public relations campaign. This work earned the Hip Hop Caucus the 30th Annual Letelier-Moffitt Human Rights Award.

=== One World One Voice ===
Yearwood's most recent movement, "One World One Voice", involves encouraging young people in the US to join the global movement and work to solve climate change. The "Green and City" campaign engages African American mayors in the movement to "green" their cities, and the "Green the Block" is a partnership with the Hip Hop Caucus and "Green For All" that was launched from the West Wing of the White House in 2009 focusing on education, awareness and service.

=== Hip Hop Rev ===
Yearwood was featured in a documentary titled "Hip Hop Rev" produced by Discovery Communications.

During the course of filming, cameras followed Yearwood from his roots in Louisiana, to the birthplace of the Hip Hop Caucus in hurricane hit New Orleans, to community organizing in South East Washington, DC, to a national Clean Energy Bus Tour with former Vice President Al Gore’s Alliance for Climate Protection, which visited nine cities across America in seven days.

"Hip Hop Rev" premiered on Discovery Communications Planet Green Channel April 23, 2011.

=== Climate activism ===
Yearwood is on the advisory board of The Climate Mobilization, a grassroots advocacy group calling for a national economic mobilization against climate change on the scale of the home front during World War II, with the goal of 100% clean energy and net zero greenhouse gas emissions by 2025. In 2015, Yearwood issued a call "to revitalize our economy and put America back to work by declaring a U.S. goal of net zero greenhouse gas emissions by 2025." He added that: "Some will no doubt call this bold national goal unrealistic, but they would underestimate the innovative genius and social conscience of the American people. America has a long and proud history of overcoming seemingly insurmountable odds (consider World War II, Apollo program and Abolitionist movement). What is unrealistic is thinking we can put off for decades action that is desperately needed now to ensure our survival as a species."

== Media appearances ==
Yearwood has appeared on CNN, BET Tonight, Al Jazeera, PBS, Fox, MTV, BBC, C-SPAN, and Hardball with Chris Mathews, and has been featured in The Washington Post, The New York Times and Vibe.
