= Rachel Noerdlinger =

American business executive

- Born: November 14, 1970 (age 56); Albuquerque, New Mexico, U.S.
- Education: Mills College (B.A., 1992)
- Known for: Public relations

Rachel Noerdlinger (born November 14, 1970) is an American publicist and longtime communications advisor to National Action Network and national civil rights leader Rev. Al Sharpton. She served as chief of staff to New York City First Lady Chirlane McCray. After leaving public service, Noerdlinger became a managing director at Mercury Public Affairs.

== Education and family ==
Rachel Noerdlinger is the adopted daughter of Peter and Judy Noerdlinger. Noerdlinger is black, and her parents are white. In 1996, Noerdlinger wrote a Washington Post op-ed arguing that black adoptees should be placed with white families only "as a last resort". Noerdlinger later stated that after she became pregnant with her son, Khari, her views on transracial adoption changed. Noerdlinger is a graduate of Mills College, an all-women's college in Oakland, California.

== Career ==
A publicist, Noerdlinger is the President of Noerdlinger Media. She interned at The Terrie Williams Agency, a preeminent African-American public relations firm. While interning at the Terrie Williams Agency, Noerdlinger worked with attorney Johnnie Cochran, whom she later served as a public relations advisor. She developed a strong relationship with one of Cochran's clients, Al Sharpton. Her PR firm worked on the Sean Bell case, the Jena Six case, and the Megan Williams case. She was Press Secretary for Sharpton's 2004 United States Democratic Presidential run. She has had a weekly segment on Sharpton's radio show. She has been called "the public relations force behind Rev. Al Sharpton and National Action Network"; she has advised Sharpton and the Network on communications since the late 1990s.

Noerdlinger Media's clients also include or have included The Cochran Firm; Paul B. Weitz and Associates; Lifflander and Reich, LLP; Rubenstein and Rynecki; and Sunshine Sachs Public Relations. Noerdlinger worked on many high-profile criminal justice reform cases including the case of Eric Garner in New York and Stephon Clark in Sacramento.

After serving as Chief of Staff to New York City First Lady Chirlane McCray, Noerdlinger became a Managing Director at Mercury Public Affairs.

=== Chief of Staff to Chirlane McCray ===
On January 20, 2014, New York City Mayor Bill de Blasio appointed Noerdlinger as Chief of Staff to New York City First Lady Chirlane McCray, a position that had not existed previously. Her annual salary was $170,000.

Noerdlinger's appointment led to controversy: Noerdlinger was criticized for not disclosing in a background questionnaire that she lived with her boyfriend, Hassaun McFarlane, who has an extensive criminal record that includes guilty pleas for manslaughter and drug trafficking. Noerdlinger was not disciplined for this omission, as the Department of Investigation "found no evidence of intent to deceive the Mayor or City Hall." Reports also indicated that Noerdlinger's home in Edgewater, New Jersey had a $28,190 federal tax lien placed on it in 2011. Noerdlinger had an outstanding E-ZPass bill of more than $7,000 for unpaid tolls and related fees on two license plates, but was paying those debts through a payment plan.

De Blasio defended Noerdlinger, comparing media attacks on her to McCarthyism and asserting that she was being treated unfairly. De Blasio added that he had never questioned Noerdlinger's judgment.

On November 18, 2014, a few days after her son had been arrested for trespassing, Noerdlinger took an unpaid leave of absence from her position at City Hall. She stepped down later that month. In December 2014, McCray replaced Noerdlinger with Roxanne John, a longtime family friend, at a salary of $200,000. McCray also appointed former National Oceanic and Atmospheric Administration official Jackie Bray as deputy chief of staff (a position which had not previously existed) at a salary of $125,000.
