= Almudena Bernabeu =

Spanish lawyer

- Born: Spain
- Education: University of Valencia
- Occupation: Lawyer
- Awards: Letelier-Moffitt Human Rights Award (2015)
- Website: https://g37chambers.com

Almudena Bernabeu is an international attorney, writer and co-founder and director of Guernica37 International Justice Chambers, Almudena Bernabeu was the director of the Transitional Justice Program at the Center for Justice and Accountability (CJA) until 2017. She is the winner of the 2015 Letelier-Moffitt Human Rights Award.

== Biography ==
Originally trained in her home country of Spain, Bernabeu holds her LLM degree from the University of Valencia School of Law and is a member of the Valencia and Madrid bar associations, as well as the American Bar Association. Bernabeu is credited with success in more than a dozen high-profile human rights cases, including the Guatemalan genocide case crucial to the recent trial of former president Efraín Ríos Montt.

== Professional career ==
As transitional justice director at the U.S.-based organization Center for Justice & Accountability, Ms. Bernabeu successfully litigated more than a dozen civil cases brought under the Alien Tort Statute and criminal cases in Europe under the Principle of Universal Jurisdiction to assist victims to achieve truth and accountability for international crimes.

Bernabeu has worked in Colombia since 2010, when she filed a lawsuit against former paramilitary member Carlos Mario Jiménez alias "Macaco" — extradited to the United States — for the assassination of attorney Alma Rosa Jaramillo and popular leader Eduardo Estrada. Bernabeu was actively involved in the Justicia y Paz process and, at present, she is at the centre of the truth and justice efforts designed in the 2016 Peace Accord, providing legal and technical guidance to both transitional institutions as well as afro-descendant, indigenous and peasant organizations from Colombia's rural areas. As a result of this process, in June 2019, ethnic communities of Buenaventura and Northern Cauca filed four legal reports on crimes against humanity committed in their regions before the Special Jurisdiction for Peace (JEP) and the Truth Commission (CEV); a landmark event seeking to guarantee the effective participation of these victims before Colombian transitional mechanisms. Nowadays, Almudena's team is working with victim's organizations of Montes de María and Putumayo to file detailed legal reports on crimes against humanity committed in the regions before the JEP and CEV. Under Bernabeu's leadership, the Guernica Centre has signed memorandums of understanding with the JEP and the CEV and built long-term alliances with academic institutions, such as the Intercultural Studies Institute of the University Javeriana of Cali, to adopt a multidisciplinary and ethnic approach to her investigations.

In Chile, Bernabeu investigated and provided essential evidence to secure a civil judgment against Pedro Barrientos Nuñez, a former lieutenant in the Chilean Military responsible for the torture and murder of the popular singer Víctor Jara.

Meanwhile, in Guatemala, Bernabeu led the investigation and prosecution of the genocide committed against the Mayan people. In 2011 this important case was the subject of the documentary film Granito: How to Nail a Dictator. The process before the Spanish National Court provided the victims the opportunity to tell their stories and present their "truth" about one of the darkest chapters in recent Guatemalan history. This investigation was instrumental in the conviction of the former Guatemalan dictator Efraín Rios Montt for genocide.

Since 2003, Bernabeu was also the lead prosecutor in the case against Salvadoran officials for the massacre of Jesuit priests in 1989. In that incident, armed members of El Salvador's army, following Salvadoran Military High Command orders, burst into the Jesuit residence at the Universidad Centroamericana in San Salvador and executed six Jesuit priests, a housekeeper and her daughter. An attack that marked a turning point in El Salvador's conflict. As a result of these investigations, a U.S. Court approved the extradition of Colonel Inocente Orlando Montano to Spain to face trial before the Spanish National Court, a trial that took place last June and July 2020 and ended with the defendant being sentenced to 133 years in prison for five crimes of terrorist murders. Bernabeu led the private prosecution of this case, while working with Salvadoran civil society to foster and strength with its accountability initiatives in the country. Among these initiatives, Bernabeu is collaborating with a victims' organization to actively support for the Salvadoran State's compliance with the Supreme Court's ruling on the unconstitutionality of the Amnesty Law (2016). Also, Bernabeu is providing technical assistance for the prosecution of crimes to the Office of the Prosecutor General in El Salvador.

Bernabeu's work was instrumental in securing the 2015 deportation from Florida to El Salvador of Carlos Eugenio Vides Casanova, a former defense minister implicated in "extrajudicial killing and torture" during the Salvadoran Civil War of 1980-1992, according to U.S. Immigration and Customs Enforcement. Another achievement by Almudena Bernabeu was bringing to justice the case of those responsible for the genocide of the Mayan people in Guatemala. The case was put before the Spanish National Court. One of the accused was Efraín Rios Montt, former dictator of Guatemala.

The team of lawyers working at G37 Despacho Internacional, together with its London partner Guernica37 International Justice Chambers, have investigated international crimes committed in Syria since March 2011, at the behest of victims' families, in order to achieve accountability and promote a processes of transitional justice, after the end of hostilities.

On 31 January 2017, and as result of these investigations, G37 Despacho Internacional filed a complaint before the Spanish National Court against members of Syrian security forces and military intelligence on the basis of their alleged responsibility for the commission of a crime of State terrorism. The complainant -the sister of a Syrian citizen arbitrarily detained, tortured and executed in a detention centre in Damascus- is a victim of Spanish nationality.

Since February 2019, Bernabeu's team has worked alongside Nicaraguan organizations to create and develop an alliance called ‘Coalition for Justice in Nicaragua' (CJN), aimed at starting investigations and accountability processes in order to promote changes and transformations that strengthen the rule of law in the country, especially after the brutal repression of 2018's demonstrations by State security forces.

In her acceptance of the 2015 Letelier-Moffitt Human Rights Award, Bernabeu explained her passion for bringing human rights violators to justice:

"I don't want to take care of the poor or those who have been tortured or those who have been abused ... I want this stupid world to stop abusing people ... . I want to help the person whose child was disappeared — of course. But my strongest sense of who I am, if I want to be super-honest, is, how can I fight and tell the world that this [expletive] was actually ordering these disappearances and getting rid of these 18-year-old students?"

== Awards ==
Bernabeu has received several other awards for her international human rights work.

- Katharine & George Alexander Law Prize
- Time magazine - 200 most influential people
- Spanish National Council of Barristers SCEVOLA Award
- Program for Torture Victims - Human Rights Hero Award
- El Pais - Top 13 Most Influential Leaders in the Spanish and Latin American World
- Honoris Causa PhD in Law from Santa Clara University.
