= Juan E. Méndez =

Argentine lawyer and activist

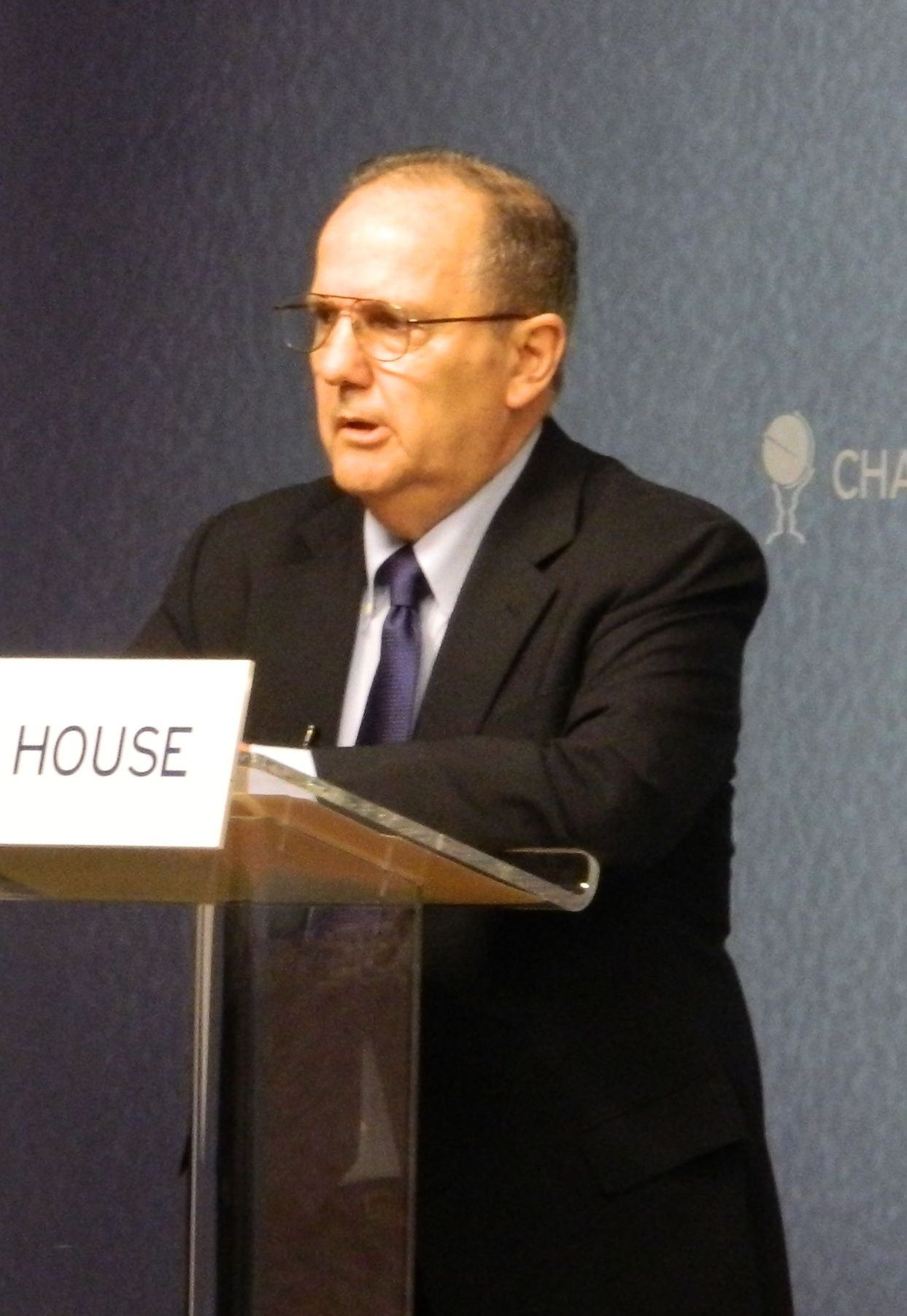
- Méndez in 2012
- Born: December 11, 1944 (age 81); Lomas de Zamora, Argentina
- Occupations: Lawyer, human rights activist, United Nations special rapporteur
- Awards: Letelier-Moffitt Human Rights Award (2014)

Juan E. Méndez (born December 11, 1944) is an Argentine lawyer, former United Nations Special Rapporteur on Torture and Other Cruel, Inhuman or Degrading Treatment or Punishment, and a human rights activist known for his work on behalf of political prisoners.

== Career ==
Méndez was born in Lomas de Zamora, on the outskirts of Buenos Aires. In 1970, he received his law degree from Stella Maris University in Mar del Plata, Buenos Aires province.

Early in his career, he became involved in representing political prisoners. As a result, he was arrested by the Argentine military dictatorship and subjected to torture and administrative detention for 18 months. During this period, Amnesty International adopted him as a "Prisoner of Conscience," and in 1977, he was expelled from the country and moved to the United States.

Subsequently, Méndez worked for the Catholic Church in Aurora, Illinois, protecting the rights of migrant workers. In 1978, he joined the Lawyers' Committee for Civil Rights under the Law in Washington, D.C., and in 1982, he launched Human Rights Watch's (HRW) Americas Program. He continued to work at Human Rights Watch for 15 years, becoming their general counsel in 1994. He is also a visiting scholar at American University Washington College of Law's Academy on Human Rights and Humanitarian Law, a Professor of Human Rights Law in Residence at the Washington College of Law, and the Faculty Director of the Anti-Torture Initiative at the law school.

From 1996 to 1999, Méndez served as the Executive Director of the Inter-American Institute of Human Rights, based in Costa Rica. He then worked as a Professor of Law and Director of the Center for Civil and Human Rights at the University of Notre Dame in the United States from October 1999 to 2004.

In 2001, Méndez began working for the International Center for Transitional Justice (ICTJ), an international human rights NGO. He served as its president from 2004 to 2009 and now is its President Emeritus. In 2014, he was a member of the Open Society Justice Initiative board.

From November 2010 to October 31, 2016, he was the UN Special Rapporteur on Torture. The Center for Human Rights and Humanitarian Law of the Washington College of Law provided its support through the creation of the Anti-Torture Initiative, with the financial support of the Ford Foundation, the Open Society Foundations, and the Oak Foundation.

Méndez has taught human rights law at Georgetown Law School, the Johns Hopkins School of Advanced International Studies, and the University of Oxford Masters Program in International Human Rights Law in the UK.

Méndez is on the Steering Committee of The Crimes Against Humanity Initiative, a rule of law project launched in 2008 by the Whitney R. Harris World Law Institute to study the need for a comprehensive convention on the prevention and punishment of crimes against humanity, analyze the necessary elements of such a convention, and draft a proposed treaty. The proposed treaty is now being debated before the UN International Law Commission.

In December 2021, the United Nations Human Rights Council appointed Méndez as a member of Racial Justice Body, a new mechanism to examine systemic racism and the excessive use of force against Africans and people of African descent by law enforcement worldwide. Méndez is one of three members along with Yvonne Mokgoro of South Africa and Tracie L. Keesee of the United States.

== Principles on Effective Interviewing for Investigations and Information Gathering (Méndez Principles) ==
In 2016, as the Special Rapporteur on torture and other cruel, inhuman or degrading treatment or punishment, Prof. Méndez submitted a thematic report to the United Nations (UN) General Assembly calling for the development of international standards for interviews based on scientific research, legal safeguards and ethical principles. A global Steering Committee of 15 members guided the process of drafting such a document, consulting an Advisory Council comprising more than 80 experts from over 40 countries. In 2021, the Principles on Effective Interviewing for Investigations and Information Gathering -- based on science, law and ethics --was approved by the Steering Committee to realize the call. These principles are also referred to as the Méndez Principles to honor Juan Méndez.

== Awards ==
He has received numerous awards for his work, including the Goler T. Butcher Medal from the American Society of International Law; a Doctorate Honoris Causa from the Université du Québec à Montréal (University of Quebec in Montreal); the "Monsignor Oscar A. Romero Award for Leadership in Service to Human Rights" by the University of Dayton; the "Jeanne and Joseph Sullivan Award" of the Heartland Alliance.; the Doctorate Honoris Causa from the Universidad Nacional de La Plata, Argentina (National University of La Plata), June 10, 2013; and the Letelier-Moffitt Human Rights Award from the Institute for Policy Studies in 2014. In 2014, Death Penalty Focus honored Méndez with their Human Rights Award.

== See also ==
- Responsibility to protect
