= Chirlane McCray =

American writer and political figure

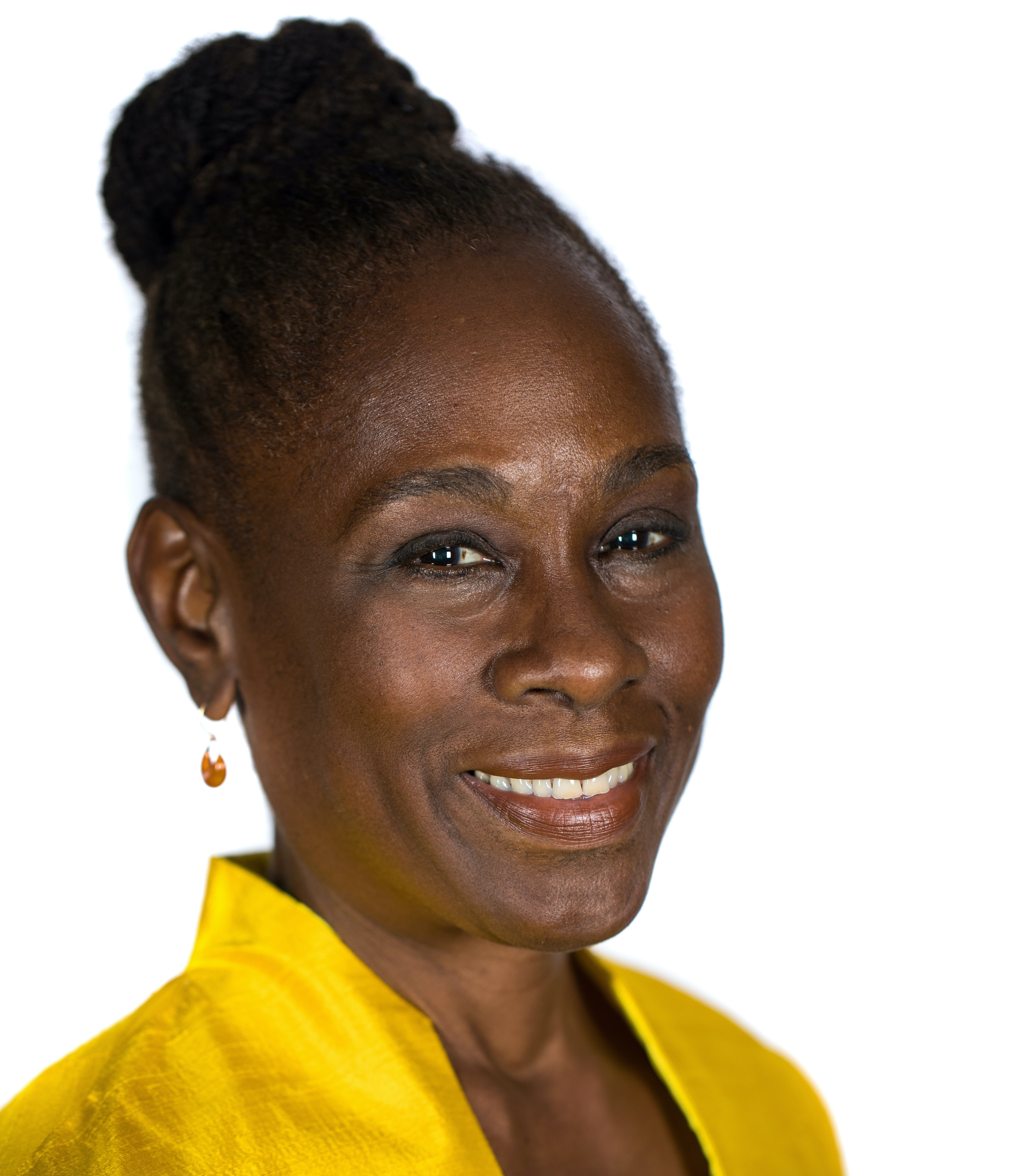
- McCray in 2019

First Lady of New York City
- In role January 1, 2014 – December 31, 2021
- Preceded by: Diana Taylor (de facto)
- Succeeded by: Tracey Collins (de facto)

Personal details
- Born: Chirlane Irene McCray; November 29, 1954 (age 71) Springfield, Massachusetts, U.S.
- Spouse: Bill de Blasio (m. 1994; sep. 2023)
- Children: 2
- Education: Wellesley College (BA)

Chirlane Irene McCray (born November 29, 1954) is an American writer, editor, and activist. She is married to former New York City Mayor Bill de Blasio and had been described as de Blasio's "closest advisor." They separated in 2023, but have announced no plans to divorce. She chaired the Mayor's Fund to Advance New York City and was appointed by her husband to lead a billion-dollar initiative called ThriveNYC. She has also published poetry and worked in politics as a speechwriter.

== Early life and education ==
McCray was born in Springfield, Massachusetts, and spent her early years there. Her mother, Katharine Clarissa Eileen (née Edwards), was an assembly worker at an electronics factory, and her father, Robert Hooper McCray, was an inventory clerk at a military base. She is of Barbadian and St. Lucian descent, but traces her grandmother's last name (Quashie) to Ghana.

When she was ten years old, her family moved to Longmeadow, Massachusetts, becoming only the second black family in the area. Other families in the neighborhood circulated petitions demanding they leave. During a portion of her high school years, McCray was the only black student in her school. McCray cites her early experience with racism and bullying as part of the reason she began to write, using her poetry as an outlet for her anger. She wrote a column for her school newspaper in which she denounced classmates for their racism.

McCray enrolled at Wellesley College in 1972. While studying there, she became a member of a black feminist organization known as the Combahee River Collective.

== Career ==
After graduating from college, McCray moved to New York City to work for Redbook. She published an essay in Essence in 1979 titled "I Am a Lesbian". Essence later described the essay as "groundbreaking", asserting that it was "perhaps the first time a Black gay woman had spoken so openly and honestly about her sexuality in a Black magazine". The purpose of the essay was to "dispel the myth that there are no gay black people". Some of her poetry is included in Home Girls: A Black Feminist Anthology.

In 1991, McCray entered politics. She worked as a speechwriter for New York City Mayor David Dinkins. During the Clinton administration, she worked for the New York Foreign Press Center as a public affairs specialist. She also worked as a speechwriter for the New York State Comptroller Carl McCall and for New York City Comptroller Bill Thompson.

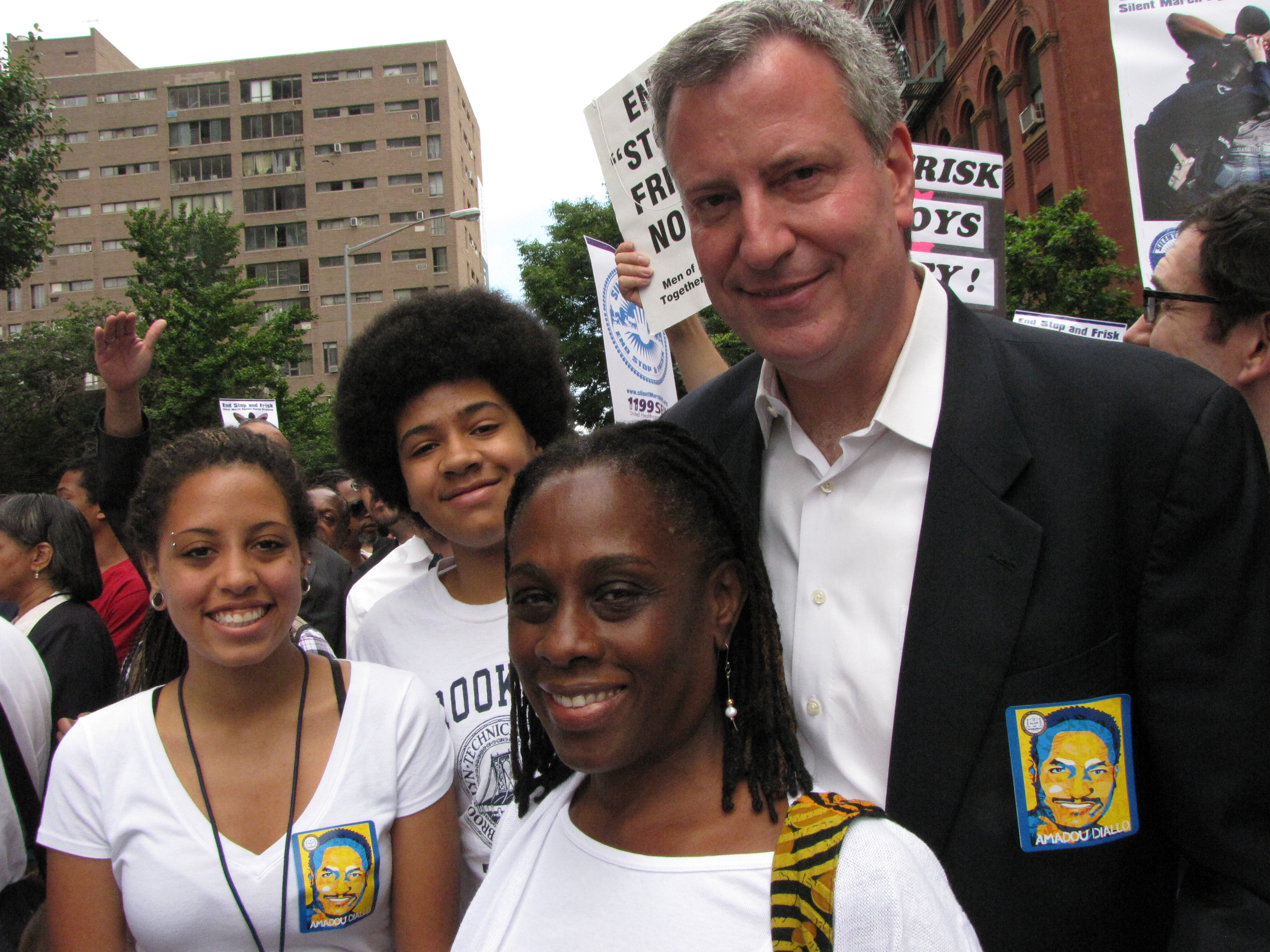
McCray with spouse, Bill de Blasio, and their two children.

In 2004, McCray left Thompson's office to work in the private sector. She worked for five years at Maimonides Medical Center. She also worked for Citigroup in its public relations department for six months before deciding it was "not a good fit". During her husband's campaign for mayor of New York City in the 2013 election, she edited his speeches and helped interview candidates for staff positions.

=== Involvement in de Blasio administration ===
When de Blasio became mayor, he hired publicist Rachel Noerdlinger to be McCray's chief of staff. Later in 2014, Noerdlinger resigned her post following a series of controversies surrounding her behavior and that of persons close to her.

In his second month in office, de Blasio named McCray chair of the Mayor's Fund to Advance New York City. Since then, the Fund has focused on mental health, immigration, and youth workforce projects. In May 2018, The New York Times reported that McCray had last visited the offices of the Mayor's Fund in May 2017. The Times further reported that according to McCray's public schedule, she had spent 19.5 hours in 2017 on work for the Mayor's Fund; however, her spokeswoman estimated that McCray spent 10% of her work schedule on Mayor's Fund business.

==== ThriveNYC ====
In November 2015, McCray led the launch of ThriveNYC, a plan to overhaul the city's mental health and substance abuse services. ThriveNYC promoted an integrated public health approach focusing on awareness and early identification. In February 2019, Politico criticized ThriveNYC for having an "opaque budget" and "elusive metrics". In a March 2019 article on ThriveNYC, The New York Times reported: "Public health officials credit the plan for drawing attention to mental health… At the same time, some initiatives failed to get started, while others placed unrealistic demands on already strained mental health services". The Times added: "A spreadsheet of nearly 500 data points tracked by City Hall included almost none related to patient outcomes".

ThriveNYC drew harsh criticism over allegations of mismanagement and accusations that it had failed to produce records of tangible results. As of March 2019, nearly $850 million in funding for McCray's mental health program was unaccounted for; furthermore, the program was on track to spend $1 billion over five years. Bronx Councilman Ritchie Torres criticized ThriveNYC, stating that there was "no evidence it’s working".

In 2021, ThriveNYC was made permanent by executive order, "rebranded" as the Office of Community Mental Health, and allocated a further $115 million. The spending plan includes $96 million for B-HEARD, an initiative that dispatches EMTs and social workers as first responders to 911 calls involving mentally ill people in an effort to prevent confrontations with the police.

=== Political ambitions ===
In March 2018, McCray stated that she was "seriously considering" running for office in 2021 (the year that de Blasio's second and final term as New York City mayor ended). McCray added that she would not run for mayor of New York City.

== Personal life ==
McCray published an essay in Essence in 1979 entitled "I Am a Lesbian". In that essay, McCray "frankly discussed her sexuality and expressed gratitude that she came to terms with her preference for women before marrying a man". McCray met Bill de Blasio in 1991, when they both worked at New York City Hall for then Mayor David Dinkins. At the time, de Blasio was an aide to a deputy mayor and McCray was a speechwriter. McCray and de Blasio were married in 1994 in Prospect Park, Brooklyn. Asked about her sexuality, McCray has stated that she hates "labels". In 2012, when asked about her 1979 essay, she commented: "In the 1970s, I identified as a lesbian and wrote about it. In 1991, I met the love of my life, married him."

McCray and de Blasio have a daughter, Chiara, and a son, Dante. The family lived in Park Slope, Brooklyn, until their 2014 move into Gracie Mansion, the official residence of the Mayor of New York City.

In July 2023, McCray and de Blasio announced their separation and that they will start dating other people, though the two would not be seeking a divorce.

Honorary titles
Preceded by Donna Hanover (2002)	First Lady of New York City; 2014–2022	Succeeded by Tracey Collins
