= J. Bryan Hehir =

American Catholic priest and philosopher (born 1940)

The Reverend Monsignor Dr. J. Bryan Hehir
- Born: 1940 (age 85–86); Lowell, Massachusetts, US
- Awards: MacArthur Fellowship (1984)

Ecclesiastical career
- Religion: Christianity (Roman Catholic)
- Church: Latin Church
- Ordained: 1966 (priest)

Academic background
- Education: Saint John's Seminary; Harvard University
- Thesis: The Ethics of Intervention (1976)

Academic work
- Discipline: Theology
- Sub-discipline: Christian ethics
- Institutions: Georgetown University; Harvard University

Joseph Bryan Hehir (born 1940) is an American Catholic priest, philosopher, and theologian in the United States. He was awarded a MacArthur Fellowship in 1984.

== Career ==
Hehir has served as the Secretary of Health and Social Services for the Archdiocese of Boston. He was also the Parker Gilbert Montgomery Professor of the Practice of Religion and Public Life at Harvard University's John F. Kennedy School of Government until his retirement in 2021.

Hehir was formerly a faculty member at Georgetown University and at the Harvard Divinity School.

Hehir was elected to the American Academy of Arts and Sciences in 1995. He became a member of the American Philosophical Society in 2002.

In 2004, he was awarded the Laetare Medal by the University of Notre Dame, the oldest and most prestigious award for American Catholics.

In 2024, Pope Francis named Hehir as a Chaplain of His Holiness with the title monsignor, in honor of his service to the Archdiocese of Boston.

He is credited by Charles Curran with coining the term "consistent ethic of life."

Awards
| Preceded by Paulo Evaristo Arns | Letelier-Moffitt Human Rights Award; 1983 | Succeeded by Ramón Custodio |
| Preceded by Philip Gleason | Marianist Award for Intellectual Contributions; 1995 | Succeeded by Charles Taylor |
