= United League (social organization) =

The United League was an African-American social movement in Northern Mississippi established in 1978, during the height of Ku Klux Klan activity in America. The United League's president and founder, Alfred "Skip" Robinson, acted against Klan activity and police brutality in the American South. Mr. Robinson was a brick mason by trade, but a charismatic preacher in practice. He led efforts in the black communities of Northern Mississippi to temper police beatings, organized citywide boycotts, prevented black land and property loss, urged armed defense among the black community, and elected local blacks into political office.

== The Leader ==
Alfred "Skip" Robinson was a brick mason by trade; however, he was also a skilled civil rights leader. Robinson mobilized the black communities throughout northern Mississippi. Teaching armed defense and unified resistance tactics, Robinson was a leader for the oppressed people in Mississippi. Under his leadership, the residents fought against illegal land grabs by the state and local governments, boycotted white-owned businesses that did not hire blacks, and rallied against the brutality of the local police and Ku Klux Klan.

== History ==
Robinson and his followers fought against the brutality of the local police and Ku Klux Klan activity during the late 1970s and early 1980s in Mississippi. Blacks across Mississippi experienced brutal beatings, black land theft, and destruction of personal property.

According to Southern Struggle (1978), the United League was "like the movement of the '60's, [the] demonstrations and boycotts raised demands for equality in hiring and education, an end to police brutality and murder of Blacks, and abolishment of the [Ku Klux] Klan…[However,] a significant difference is in the United Leagues' slogan of 'Jobs, Land, and Freedom.' The League has been organizing Afro-Americans to win back the 9 million acres (36,000 km^{2}) stolen from them by banks and agribusinesses in the last decade. To our knowledge, this is the first time since the 1930s that hundreds of Black people have united to fight for their land."

=== In Tupelo, Mississippi ===
The members of the local community began marching in downtown Tupelo in 1979. During this time, the United League was active throughout the state. According to the Clarion Ledger (March 5, 1979, p. 3A), Robinson said, "the League would continue its boycott efforts in Lexington, Okolona, and Canton. Robinson said that charges of police brutality, which sparked the Tupelo protests, will mark Indianola and Grenada as sites for League activity."

The Tupelo activity was an extended battle between local black citizens and various white-owned and white-ran establishments, including local police. The blacks marched in unison. Robinson stated, "In employment, the city business have not hired enough blacks and the ratio of black and white school-teachers in the Tupelo high school is not in proportion to the number of black students. (The Commercial Appeal, Sunday, March 4, 1979).

In final analysis, according to the Southern Struggle (Nov-Dec, 1978), the "November 25 National March on Tupelo symbolized a new dawning for the Black liberation movement…The 3,000 marching in Tupelo showed that the cause of freedom is capturing the hearts and minds of people across the country. People came to Tupelo from the tiny backwater towns and from the huge, far-away cities…Just as the civil rights movement of the 60's began with a spark of resistance and grew to include millions in a march towards equality, in 1978, Tupelo is an inspiration for all who will join this movement – an inspiration that tells all working people that we can fight back and eventually win."

=== In Okolona, Mississippi ===
In 1978, through marching and boycotts, the United League was active in Okolona, Mississippi. The "United League members said the demonstration was called to protest alleged racial discrimination and police brutality in the northern Mississippi community of about 3,000 persons…League leader Alfred "Skip" Robinson said the march would be one of several demonstrations planned. [Robinson stated,] "We're going to march and be in Okolona until every business goes out of business" (Clarion Ledger 3/19/1979).

During that same year, the members of the local community and the United League fired over one hundred rounds of bullets in a gunfight against the Ku Klux Klan. In the end, Alfred Robinson recounted, "When the shooting was over, six Klan were lying in the street and six were running. One of the six in the street was dead." Mr. Robinson stated that afterward neither party talked about the events that occurred on that day.

=== In Byhalia, Mississippi ===
In 1978, in extensive and lasting social activism, the United League intervened when blacks were being killed every week. The United League and its supporters warned local police and the Klan that they would take "a life for a life"; and the killings ceased. In addition, during this time, the United League and its supporters led a citywide boycott and handed the local businesses a "list of demands, which included the hiring of blacks in stores and schools." As a result, many white-owned businesses suffered bankruptcy and were no longer viable without black consumerism.

=== In Ripley, Mississippi ===
Robinson recounted, "In Ripley, at first, I couldn't get five people together. Now [less than a year later] I fill the funeral home at every meeting. That's 300 people." Alfred Robinson and other leaders gave the black community a sense of hope. Robinson, in particular, had preacher-like skills, and he knew the importance of the church within the black community.

=== Organizational Resources ===
The United League used a combination of local resources. The black churches provided financial support. Robinson argued, "The only way you can defeat the Klan is by building a strong base in the community and letting them know you will fight back."

In Ripley, one of the first stops of the United League was a beauticians' school owned by a local community activist, Mrs. Hazel Foster Christmas. These types of facilities provided communication networks within a community and were a vital component of the United League.

=== The Women Leaders ===
The United League recognized the leadership capabilities and strength in their female membership. George Williams, another League leader, stated, "[Women] are the ones who carry on the task of building the organization, planning protests and boycotts, and above all convincing people that they can stand ... against social violence."

=== Organizational Characteristics ===
The United League employed boycotts, armed defense, and organized protest activities in order to effect change in northern Mississippi. United League supporters like L.B. Groover actively engaged in local political campaigns. In combination, these social resources united monies, labor, volunteerism, and activism within the Mississippi community.

Additionally, through the guidance of Robinson, the United League and its members in northern Mississippi organized community meetings and created a coalition of resources in the struggle for human and civil rights. Robinson claimed that the United League members "[went] house to house, street by street, through the black community" and encouraged community activist workshops.

=== The Current Status of the Organization ===
The United League is no longer an active organization.
