= Home (Hip Hop Caucus album) =

HOME

Compilation album by Hip Hop Caucus
- Released: December 2, 2014
- Recorded: 2014
- Genre: Hip hop
- Length: 39:02
- Label: The Private Plane
- Producer: Malik Yusef, D Cross, Urban RockStarz

HOME is a compilation album from American political activism organization Hip Hop Caucus. Announced on 14 November 2014, and released via iTunes on 2 December 2014, the albums features songs from prominent artists such as Elle Varner, Ne-Yo and Crystal Waters. The first single from the album, "Mercy Mercy Me" by recording artist Antonique Smith was released on 20 September 2014.

== Track listing ==
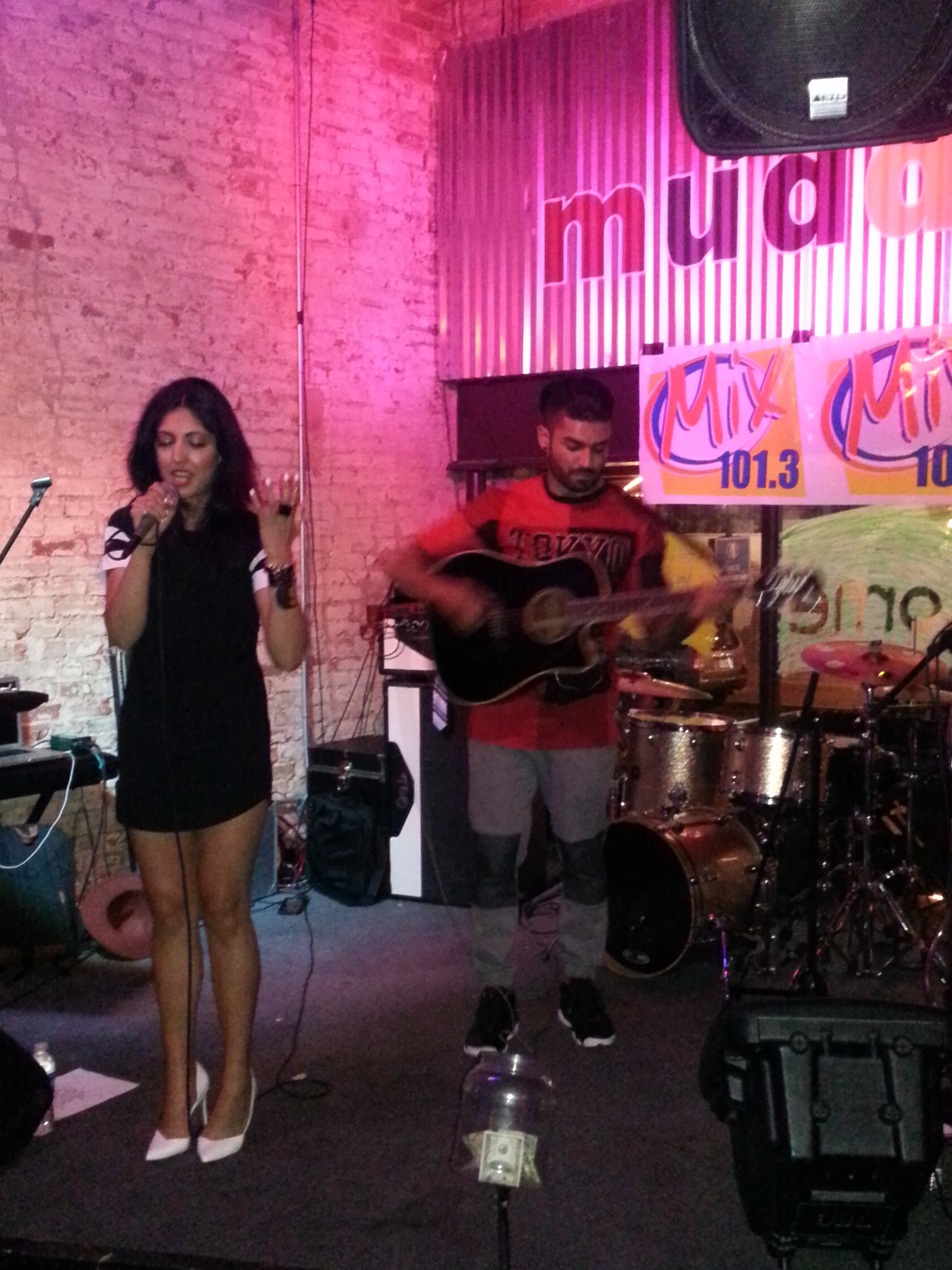
Auggie Del Rey and Sirena Legend from Queen of Kings

No.	Title	Writer(s)	Length
1.	"Spaceship Odyssey 2000" (Malik Yusef feat. Laci Kay, Auggie Del Rey‡, Mandy Rain, Sirena Legend‡, Joaquin Evans)		4:26
2.	"Mercy Mercy Me" (covered by Antonique Smith)	Marvin Gaye	2:46
3.	"Trouble in the Water" (Common, Malik Yusef, Kumasi feat. Aaron Fresh, Choklate, Laci Kay)		3:47
4.	"One of Us" (Candice Glover + Jessica Care Moore)		2:31
5.	"Earth Song" (Ne-Yo + Sonna Rele)	Michael Jackson	3:58
6.	"Everything" (Choklate)		3:25
7.	"Big Yellow Taxi" (Karmin)	Joni Mitchell	3:02
8.	"Which Side Are you On?" (Elle Varner)		3:00
9.	"Always" (Malik Yusef feat. Ryan McDermott, Hassan Khaffaf, KC Joe)		4:34
10.	"Children of the Ghetto" (Crystal Waters)		3:21
11.	"Outerspaceship" (Raheem DeVaughn)		4:12
Total length:			39:02

‡ Members of American rock band Queen of Kings
