= Joseph Brain (academic) =

American physiologist and environmental health researcher (1940–2024)

- Joseph David Brain
- Born: January 20, 1940; Paterson, New Jersey, U.S.
- Died: January 29, 2024 (aged 84)
- Citizenship: United States
- Education: Taylor University; Harvard T.H. Chan School of Public Health
- Spouse: Judith Barbara Brain
- Children: 3
- Scientific career
- Fields: Environmental health, nanomedicine, physics, medicine, public health research, air quality, physiology
- Workplaces: Harvard School of Public Health

Joseph David Brain (January 20, 1940 – January 29, 2024) was an American physiologist and environmental health researcher, who served as the Cecil K. and Philip Drinker Professor of Environmental Physiology at Harvard T.H. Chan School of Public Health, where he taught and researched for over fifty years.

== Early life ==
Born in Paterson, New Jersey and raised in Wayne, New Jersey, Brain attended Eastern Christian High School in North Haledon, New Jersey, after which he went in 1957 to Taylor University in Upland, Indiana, where he majored in physics. After his graduation from (then) Taylor College, Brain was offered the Danforth Foundation Graduate Fellowship (1961–1966) at Harvard.

== Education ==
- High School Diploma, 1957, Eastern Christian High School, North Haledon, New Jersey
- B.A. (Physics, Summa cum laude), 1961, Taylor University, Upland, Indiana
- S.M., 1962, Harvard Paulson School of Engineering and Applied Sciences - on Danforth Foundation Graduate Fellowship (1961–1966)
- S.M., 1963, Harvard Paulson School of Engineering and Applied Sciences - on Danforth Foundation Graduate Fellowship (1961–1966)
- S.D., 1966, Harvard T.H. Chan School of Public Health - on Danforth Foundation Graduate Fellowship (1961–1966)

== Career ==
Brain served as the Cecil K. and Philip Drinker Professor of Environmental Physiology at Harvard T.H. Chan School of Public Health, and participated in the leadership of The Lown Institute. After graduation from Taylor, Brain was offered the Danforth Foundation Graduate Fellowship (1961–1966) at Harvard.

Brain took part in a five-year collaboration signed between the University of Malaya (UM) and Harvard University in the search for more effective treatment of lung diseases through nanomedicine. In 1998, he was named the Director of the Kresge Center for Environmental Health at Harvard.

Brain was director of Respiratory Biology Program (1981–1993) and Physiology Program (1993–1997). He was also chair of the Department of Environmental Health at Harvard T.H. Chan School of Public Health (1990–2005).

== Personal life and death ==
Brain was married and lived in Essex, Massachusetts. He served on the Taylor University Board of Trustees from 1988 to 2009.

Joseph Brain died on January 29, 2024, at the age of 84.

== Honors ==
- U.S. Atomic Energy Commission Fellowship in Health Physics 1961–1962
- Danforth Foundation Graduate Fellowship 1961–1966
- USPHS Radiological Health Fellowship 1962–1966
- NIH Research Career Development Award 1969–1974
- Aaron Brown Lecturer (University of Pittsburgh) 1981
- American Men and Women of Science 1982
- Alumnus of the Year, Taylor University 1984
- Fellow, American Association for the Advancement of Science 1987
- NIH MERIT Award 1987–1995
- Henry D. Chadwick Medal, Massachusetts Thoracic Society 1993
- Honorary Professor of Huazhong University of Science and Technology (HUST), 1999, Wuhan, China
- Recognition of Merit, Librarians, Archivists, and Museum Professionals in the History of the Health Sciences's (LAMPHHS), 2022

== Selected publications ==
- Lichtenstein JHR, Molina RM, Donaghey TC, Brain JD. "Strain differences influence murine pulmonary responses to Stachybotrys chartarum". Am J Respir Cell Mol Biol. 2006; 35:415–23.
- Trujillo JR, Rogers R, Molina RM, Dangond F, McLane MF, Essex M, Brain JD. "Non-infectious entry of HIV-1 into peripheral and brain macrophages mediated by the mannose receptor". PNAS. 2007; 104(12):5097–5102.
- Molina RM and Brain JD. "In vivo comparison of cat alveolar and pulmonary intravascular macrophages: phagocytosis, particle clearance, and cytoplasmic motility". Exp Lung Res. 2007; 33(2):53–70.
- Brain JD, Curran MA, Donaghey T, Molina R. "Responses of the lungs to nanomaterials depend on exposure, clearance, and material characteristics". Nanotoxicology. 2009; 3(1–4):173–9.
- Bellows CF, Molina RM, Brain JD. "Diminished organelle motion in murine Kupffer cells during the erythrocytic stage of malaria". J R Soc Interface. 2011 May 6;8(58):711–9.
- Lichtenstein JHR, Molina RM, Donaghey TC, Amuzie C, Pestka JJ, Coull BA, Brain JD. "Pulmonary responses to Stachybotrys chartarum and its toxins: Mouse strain affects clearance and macrophage cytotoxicity". Toxicol Sci. 2010 Jul;116(1):113–21.
- Molina RM, Phattanarudee S, Kim J, Thompson K, Wessling-Resnick M, Maher TJ, Brain JD. "Ingestion of Mn and Pb by rats during and after pregnancy alters behavior in offspring". NeuroToxicology. 2011; 32(4):413–22.
- Thompson K, Molina R, Donaghey T, Schwob J, Brain JD. "Manganese uptake and distribution in the brain after methyl bromide-induced lesions in the olfactory epithelia". Toxicol Sci. 2011 Mar;120(1):163–72.
- Mendivil CO, Teeter JG, Finch GL, Schwartz PF, Riese RJ, Kawabata T, Brain JD. "Trough insulin levels in bronchoalveolar lavage following inhaled human insulin (Exubera®) in patients with diabetes mellitus". Diabetes Technol Ther. 2012; 14(1):50–8.
- Molina R, Schaider L, Donaghey T, Shine J, Brain JD. "Mineralogy affects geoavailability, bioaccessibility and bioavailability of zinc". Environ Pollut. 2013; 182:217–24.
- Pirela S, Molina R, Watson C, Cohen J, Bello, Demokritou P, Brain JD. "Effects of copy center particles on the lungs: A toxicological characterization using a Balb/c mice model". Inhalation Toxicology. 2013; 25(9):498–508.
- Molina RM, Konduru NV, Jimenez RJ, Wohlleben W, Brain JD. "Bioavailability, distribution and clearance of tracheally instilled, gavaged or injected cerium dioxide nanoparticles and ionic cerium". Environ Sci: Nano. 2014; 1:561–73.
- Brain JD, Kreyling WG, and Godleski JJ. "Inhalation Toxicology". In: Hayes' Principles and Methods of Toxicology. Sixth Edition. Edited By: A. Wallace Hayes and Claire L. Kruger. CRC Press: Boca Raton. 2014. Pages 1385–1444.
- Mendivil CO, Koziel H, Brain JD. "Metabolic hormones, apolipoproteins, adipokines, and cytokines in the alveolar lining fluid of healthy adults: compartmentalization and physiological correlates". PLoS One. 2015 Apr 7;10(4):e0123344 (15 pages).
- Rosenblum-Lichtenstein JH, Hsu Y-H, Gavin IM, Donaghey TC, Molina RM, Thompson KJ, Chi C-L, Gillis BS, Brain JD. "Environmental mold and mycotoxin exposures elicit specific cytokine and chemokine responses". PLoS One. 2015 May 26;10(5):e0126926. (22 pages)
- Watson CY, Damiani F, Ram-Moham S, Rodrigues S, de Moura Queiroz P, Donaghey TC, Rosenblum Lichtenstein JH, Brain JD, Krishnan R, Molina RM. "Screening for chemical toxicity using cryopreserved precision cut lung slices". Toxicological Sciences. 2016;150(1):225–33.
- Rosenblum Lichtenstein JH, Molina RM, Donaghey TC, Hsu YH, Mathews JA, Kasahara DI, Park JA, Bordini A, Godleski JJ, Gillis BS, Brain JD. "Repeated mouse lung exposures to Stachybotrys chartarum shift immune response from type 1 to type 2". Am J Respir Cell Mol Biol. 2016 May 5. [Epub ahead of print]
