= Colibrí Center for Human Rights =

Non-governmental organization

External media

Audio
- Robin Reineke on the Colibri Center For Human Rights, KXCI, February 2, 2014

Video
- A Most Dangerous Journey: Tracing the Human Cost of Immigration From Altar to Arizona, CBS, JIM AVILA and ELY BROWN, January 3, 2014

The Colibrí Center for Human Rights is a non-profit non-governmental organization that uses forensic anthropology and advocacy to identify lives lost on the United States–Mexico border and to help families find loved ones who have gone missing on the border. Their director Robin Reineke won a Letelier-Moffitt Human Rights Award in 2014.

== History ==
Founded in 2013 by co-founders Chelsea Halstead, Reyna Araibi, William Masson and Robin Reineke, Colibrí came out of research on the US-Mexico border and in Mexico among forensic scientists, government officials, and families of the missing and dead. They are organized in Tucson, Arizona.

They work closely with the Pima County Medical Examiner to identify migrant lives lost.

== Programs ==
Missing Migrant Project

The organization started out of a need to identify hundreds of remains that had been recovered in the Tucson sector of the US-Mexico border, housed in the Pima County Medical Examiner’s Office. By completing intakes with families who were missing loved ones and comparing physical characteristics and details to the remains, Colibrí has been able to facilitate positive matches and bring answers to families. In 2016, Colibrí added the DNA Program to the Missing Migrant Project. Because of the harsh environment of the Sonoran Desert, remains are often fragmented and scattered. In these contexts, Colibrí collects DNA from family members of the missing who wish to complete a DNA comparison and sends the DNA to a private lab in the hopes of a blind match. Colibrí takes the next steps in notifying the family.

Family Network

The family network is part of the advocacy branch of Colibrí. Networks across the country are comités of families who are experiencing similar “ambiguous loss” or death of a loved one. The groups are an opportunity to provide mutual support and solidarity.

Historias Y Recuerdos

In efforts to raise consciousness about human rights crisis on the US-Mexico border, Colibrí collects stories and testimonies of loved ones lost or missing on the border.
