= Eastern Christian High School =

Private high school in Passaic County, New Jersey, United States

Location
- 50 Oakwood Avenue; North Haledon, Passaic County, New Jersey 07508; United States
- Coordinates: 40.945637°N 74.180587°W

Information
- Type: Private Christian
- NCES School ID: 02044443
- Faculty: 27.5 FTEs
- Grades: 9 – 12
- Enrollment: 292 (as of 2021–22)
- Student to teacher ratio: 10.6:1
- Colors: Blue and Yellow
- Athletics conference: North Jersey Interscholastic Conference
- Nickname: Eagles
- Tuition: $9,790 – $17,800 (grades 9-12)
- Website: www.easternchristian.org

Eastern Christian High School (ECHS) is a private Christian high school located in North Haledon, in Passaic County, in the U.S. state of New Jersey. The high school is a part of the Eastern Christian School Association which also has a middle school (ECMS) in Wyckoff, and an elementary school (ECES) and preschool in Midland Park. ECHS is home to students from middle and northern NJ as well as southern NY. ECHS also offers a one to four year middle and high school program for F-1 Visa Students.

As of the 2021–22 school year, the school had an enrollment of 292 students and 27.5 classroom teachers (on an FTE basis), for a student–teacher ratio of 10.6:1. The school's student body was 51.4% (150) White, 20.9% (61) Asian, 11.3% (33) Hispanic, 9.9% (29) Black and 6.5% (19) two or more races.

== Academics ==
Eastern Christian follows a program called "Faith in Action" in which every student in the high school is required to complete a certain amount of volunteer hours in order to get their high school diploma.

ECHS offers seven different Humanities and STEM Fields concentrations. Just like a college major, these concentrations allow students to identify their budding interests and talents, then develop skills in a focus area.

Project Acceleration is a set of courses designated for dual credit, which allow a student to receive both high school credit toward a diploma and also college credit from a specified institution. Eastern Christian High School has dual credit courses which are offered in an online format and also dual credit courses which are offered in our classrooms in partnership with Seton Hall University in our Project Acceleration program. Upon completion of a course, the student may receive credits on a college transcript.

For Academic Support, ECHS aspires to help students with academic subject areas study skills, and self-advocacy delivered in three ways:

1. The least restrictive environment is being enrolled in the resource room (offered on an alternating or daily basis.) This is a credit class that includes study skills and help with a student's current academic schedule.
2. A greater degree of service is through an inclusion model. Supported through EC staff or County services as in-class support. Teachers with expertise in differentiation work alongside high school staff. As we make the curriculum more accessible for students who learn differently, all students benefit. (Universal design)
3. The highest level of intervention is a remediation class that parallels the grade level college prep curriculum.

While ECHS does support students in all academic areas, their most common differentiation takes place in English, Language Arts, and Math.

As the oldest and largest Christian day school in the New York Metropolitan area, Eastern Christian is also affiliated with Christian Schools International, which includes 425 school systems in the United States and Canada. The faculty is New Jersey State certified with an average teaching experience of 15 years; almost half having earned advanced degrees.

== Athletics and extracurricular activities ==
The Eastern Christian Eagles participate in the North Jersey Interscholastic Conference, which consists of small-enrollment schools in Bergen, Hudson, Morris and Passaic counties. The high school offers 23 teams across 12 sports with 252 students participating in at least one of these offerings.

While 60% of students are involved in the athletic program, ECHS also offers a range of other activities to meet student interests. These include fly fishing, musical production, robotics, gardening and more.

== Notable alumni ==
- Joseph Brain (born 1940, class of 1957), physiologist and environmental health researcher
- Jonas Brothers, musicians Kevin (born 1987) and Joe (born 1989) attended the school
- Peter Kreeft (born 1937, class of 1955), philosopher and author of numerous popular books of Christian philosophy, theology, and apologetics
- Bethany Joy Lenz (born 1981), singer, actress
- Alexander Noyes (born 1986), drummer for the band Honor Society
- Katie Sagona (born 1989), actress.
- Antonique Smith (born 1983), actress/singer best known for her starring role as Mimi in Jonathan Larson's Broadway production of Rent and starred as Faith Evans in the film Notorious
