= Thomas J. Dodd Prize in International Justice and Human Rights =

Human rights award

The Thomas J. Dodd Prize in International Justice and Human Rights is awarded biennially by the University of Connecticut to an individual or group who has made a significant effort to advance the cause of international justice and global human rights.

The Dodd Prize commemorates the distinguished career in public service of Thomas J. Dodd who, as Executive Trial Counsel at the Nuremberg Trials and Connecticut's U.S. Senator from 1959 to 1971, fought against human rights abuses in the United States and abroad.

The prize carries a monetary award of $100,000 and a commemorative bronze bust of Thomas J. Dodd.

== Prize recipients ==
The Prize winners, per the Dodd Center for Human Rights:

- 2003: Taoiseach Bertie Ahern, T.D., Prime Minister of Ireland and the Right Honourable Tony Blair
- 2005: Former United Nations High Commissioner for Human Rights Louise Arbour and South African Justice Richard Goldstone
- 2007: Center for Justice and Accountability and Mental Disability Rights International
- 2009: Committee to Protect Journalists
- 2011: Center for Justice and International Law (CEJIL)
- 2013: Business and Human Rights Resource Centre
- 2015: Tostan and Bill Clinton
- 2017: Physicians for Human Rights
- 2019: Bryan Stevenson and the Equal Justice Initiative he founded in 1989
- 2023: Babyn Yar Holocaust Memorial Center
