= Center for Justice and Accountability =

US nonprofit pursuing human-rights accountability

- Founded: 1998
- Type: Non-profit
- Location: San Francisco, California
- Services: Legal Representation, Human Rights Policy & Education
- Fields: Human rights; civil litigation and criminal prosecution in cases of torture and severe human rights abuses
- Website: cja.org

The Center for Justice and Accountability (CJA) is a US non-profit international human rights organization based in San Francisco, California. Founded in 1998, CJA represents survivors of torture and other grave human rights abuses in cases against individual rights violators before U.S. and Spanish courts. CJA has pioneered the use of civil litigation in the United States as a means of redress for survivors from around the world.

== Mission ==
The Center for Justice & Accountability is dedicated to ending torture and other human rights abuses while vindicating the rights of survivors to seek truth, justice and redress. Through criminal and civil litigation, CJA works to create a record of truth and refine human rights jurisprudence, while promoting the principles of universal jurisdiction and the rule of law. Often, the impact of CJA's casework extends beyond redress for the immediate plaintiffs and can serve as a catalyst for transitional justice movements abroad. While CJA works to close off the United States as a safe haven for violators of human rights, the organization also supports efforts to prosecute violators in national courts around the world.

== History ==
CJA plaintiff Kemal Mehinovic testifies at the Hague

In August 1998, The Center for Justice & Accountability filed its first case, Mehinovic v. Vuckovic, on behalf of a Bosnian torture and detention camp survivor. Since then, CJA has pursued an extensive docket of human rights cases, winning favorable verdicts in all cases that have gone to trial. As of early 2009, CJA has filed high-profile cases against the following former military or political leaders who were responsible for systematic human rights abuses:

- Two commanders in the Peruvian military responsible for the Accomarca massacre
- Two heads of state of Guatemala and other senior military personnel
- A member of the Haitian High Command
- The leader of a Haitian death squad
- A Vice Minister of Defense of El Salvador
- A Prime Minister of Somalia
- A Defense Minister of Somalia
- A Honduran Chief of Military Intelligence

Senator Christopher Dodd and Thomas Wilsted, Director of the Thomas J. Dodd Research Center with CJA board and staff members

In recognition of its accomplishments, CJA was awarded the Third Thomas J. Dodd Prize in International Justice and Human Rights on October 1, 2007. The Dodd Prize is awarded biannually by the University of Connecticut to an individual or group who has made a significant effort to advance the cause of international justice and global human rights.

== Legal framework for human rights litigation ==
=== Civil litigation for human rights ===
CJA is part of a movement of legal non-governmental organizations who use civil litigation to enforce international human rights law in the U.S. CJA's litigation draws on two principal statutes: the Alien Tort Statute (ATS) (also known as the Alien Tort Claims Act) and the Torture Victim Protection Act (TVPA). These statutes grant U.S. courts jurisdiction to hear civil actions filed against perpetrators of gross human rights violations, even when those violations took place overseas.

Since the U.S. 2nd Circuit Court of Appeal's landmark 1980 decision in Filartiga v. Pena-Irala, this class of civil action has opened up U.S. federal courts to the implementation of international law and human rights safeguards:

In the twentieth century the international community has come to recognize the common danger posed by the flagrant disregard of basic human rights ... Among the rights universally proclaimed by all nations ... is the right to be free of physical torture. Indeed, for purposes of civil liability, the torturer has become—like the pirate and slave trader before him—hostis humani generis, an enemy of all mankind. Our holding today ... is a small but important step in the fulfillment of the ageless dream to free all people from brutal violence.

The authors of International Human Rights Litigation in U.S. Courts—the authoritative manual for ATS and TVPA litigation—echo the Filartiga ruling:

Although not a substitute for other means of holding perpetrators accountable, human rights litigation contributes to an important long-term objective: working toward a world in which those who commit gross violations of human rights are brought to justice swiftly, in whatever country they try to hide.

Legal scholar Beth Van Schaack has argued that these broader objectives place human rights litigation in line with the public impact litigation model pioneered by the American civil rights movement. Both strategies aim to effect systemic social change through the legal process. In the majority of CJA's cases, however, the primary focus remains on direct client advocacy: the needs of a client take first priority, while a case's broader impact remains a second order effect. (cf. "With All Deliberate Speed: Civil Human Rights Litigation as Tool for Social Change")

=== Universal jurisdiction ===
Rigoberta Menchú Tum, Nobel laureate and private prosecutor in the Guatemalan genocide case in Spain

Underpinning CJA's mission is the principle of universal jurisdiction. With roots in the ancient body of law related to piracy and slave-traders, this doctrine of international law holds that certain crimes are so egregious that the perpetrators may be held accountable wherever they are found. Since the Nuremberg Trials of 1945-49, modern jurisprudence has extended the doctrine to encompass the following crimes: genocide, crimes against humanity, war crimes and torture.

In 2001, the Princeton Principles on Universal Jurisdiction, defined universal jurisdiction as:

[C]riminal jurisdiction based solely on the nature of the crime, without regard to where the crime was committed, the nationality of the alleged or convicted perpetrator, the nationality of the victim, or any other connection to the state exercising such jurisdiction.

CJA has drawn on the principle of universal jurisdiction to try cases in U.S courts and before the Spanish National Court. Since the 1998 prosecution of former Chilean dictator Augusto Pinochet, Spain has adopted universal jurisdiction over cases of severe violations of international human rights law. CJA has initiated criminal investigations with the Spanish court to prosecute human rights abuses in Guatemala and El Salvador.

In a July 18, 2006 interview, CJA executive director, Pamela Merchant, made clear the connection between ATS litigation and broader universal jurisdiction efforts:

[U]niversal jurisdiction is the endgame ... Here we're using the Alien Tort Statute, [elsewhere] we're using other vehicles, but there are crimes so outrageous that they should be prosecuted anywhere if the appropriate governments aren't doing it.

=== Command responsibility ===
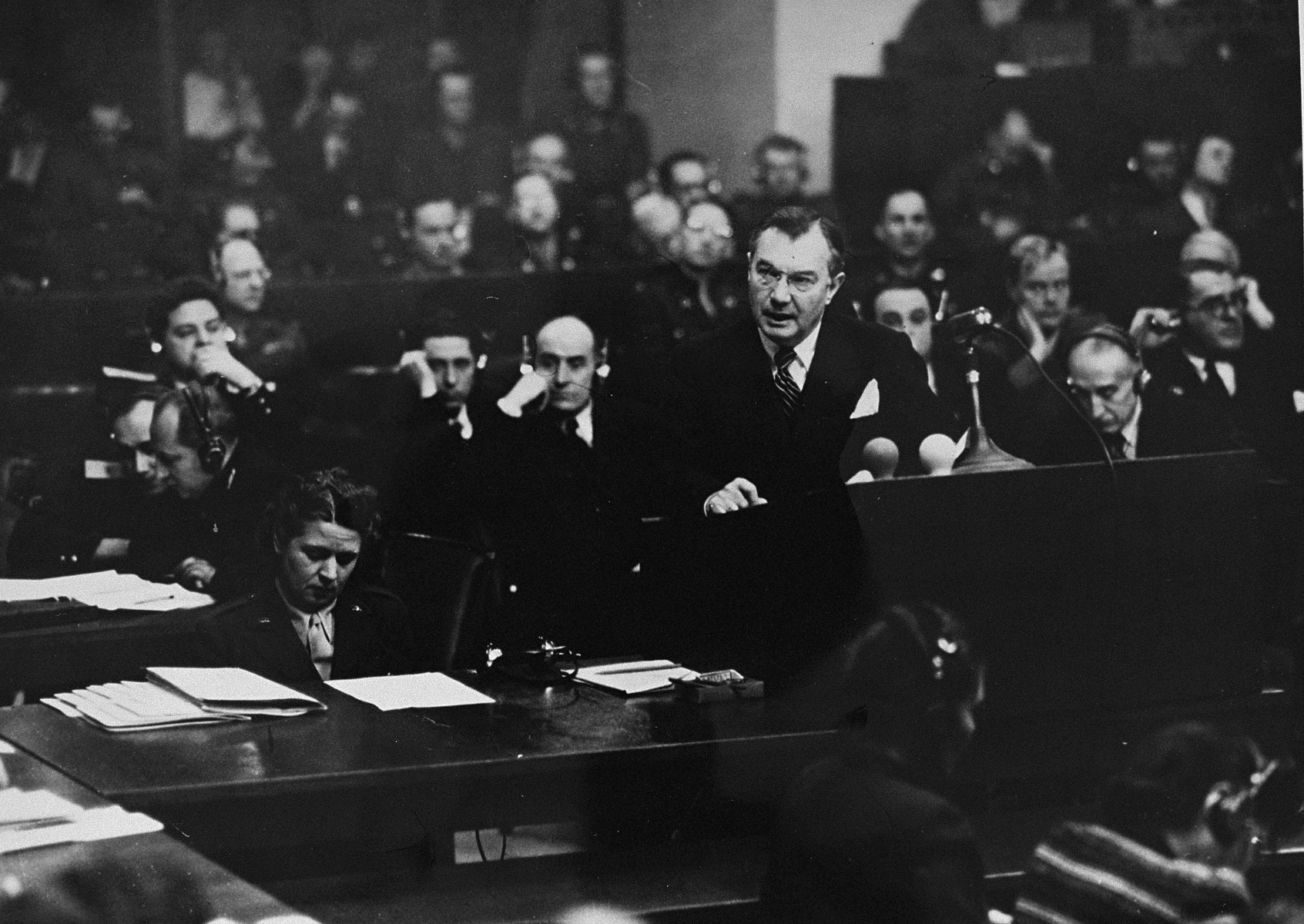
Chief American prosecutor Justice Robert Jackson delivers the opening speech of the American prosecution at the International Military Tribunal trial of war criminals at Nuremberg.

Proponents of universal jurisdiction assert that real deterrence cannot be achieved until military and government officials are aware that they can be held individually accountable, not just for committing abuses, but for their failure to take reasonable action to stop others under their command from committing abuses. This claim is derived from the principle of command responsibility, the doctrine of complicity which provided the legal foundation for the Nuremberg Trials against senior Nazi war criminals. The command responsibility doctrine was enshrined in U.S. law by the U.S. Supreme Court decision In Re Yamashita (1946). Command responsibility is now an established theory of liability, thanks in part to the body of case law that has developed around CJA's litigation and the casework of other organizations pursuing similar strategies, notably the Center for Constitutional Rights and EarthRights International.

=== Transitional justice ===
Much of CJA's litigation and advocacy work is performed with survivors from countries still struggling to transition from an authoritarian past to a stable democratic present. Uncovering and seeking redress for human rights crimes is often a necessary component of a nation's emergence from civil strife and repression. Transitional justice denotes the process by which societies address the crimes of prior regimes as they move from a period of violent conflict or oppression toward peace, democracy and the rule of law. Drawing on a broad palette of mechanisms—from truth commissions, civil actions and criminal tribunals to works of public art devoted to historical memory—transitional justice has become an important means to build civil society in post-conflict situations.

== Case docket ==
=== Bosnia and Herzegovina ===
Mehinovic v. Vuckovic (War crimes and ethnic cleansing)

This case was filed on behalf of Bosnian Muslims tortured by a Bosnian Serb soldier at a detention camp in Bosnia-Herzegovina. The charges included torture; crimes against humanity; arbitrary detention; cruel, inhuman and degrading treatment; war crimes; and genocide.

In 2002, the U.S District Court for the Northern District of Georgia held Vuckovic liable and awarded each plaintiff $10 million in compensatory damages and $25 million each in punitive damages.

=== Chile ===
Cabello v. Fernández Larios (Augusto Pinochet's "Caravan of Death")

In 2001, CJ filed a case against Armando Fernández Larios, an operative of the former Chilean dictator Augusto Pinochet and officer in the notorious "Caravan of Death", a Chilean military delegation believed to have killed more than 70 civilians during a journey by helicopter 1973.

In 2003, a Florida jury found Fernández Larios responsible for torture and murder and awarded the plaintiffs four million dollars in damages. The trial marks the first time that any Pinochet operative has been tried in the United States for their role in human rights abuses committed in Chile, as well as the first jury verdict for crimes against humanity in the United States.

=== China ===
Doe v. Liu Qi (Torture and religious persecution)

In February 2002, CJA filed a civil action against the Liu Qi — Mayor of Beijing and head of the Beijing 2008 Olympic Games Committee. The suit alleged that Qi had authority over police forces in Beijing who had carried out brutal repressive measures against Falun Gong practitioners.

In 2004, Judge Claudia Wilken issued a default judgment against Liu Qi for his role in the torture of Falun Gong practitioners.

=== El Salvador ===
Romagoza Arce v. García (Command responsibility for atrocities) Filed in 1999, the case charged Generals José Guillermo García and Carlos Eugenio Vides Casanova with liability for torture. The generals both served as former Ministers of Defense.

In 2002, a West Palm Beach, Florida jury found the generals responsible for the torture of the three plaintiffs. In January 2006, the 11th Circuit court upheld the $54.6 million jury verdict on appeal and in July 2006, Defendant Vides Casanova was forced to relinquish over $300,000 of his own assets.

Doe v. Saravia (Assassination of Archbishop Óscar Romero )

The March 24, 1980 assassination of Salvadoran Archbishop Óscar Romero — a revered human rights defender — was arguably the most infamous political murder in 20th-century Latin America. Yet for years, one of the perpetrators of this crime, Alvaro Saravia, lived freely in Modesto, California. In 2003, CJA filed a suit against Saravia alleging that he procured weapons and vehicles to assist in the assassination, provided his personal driver to transport the assassin to and from the chapel where Romero was shot and paid the assassin for his deed.

In September 2004, Judge Oliver Wanger declared that the assassination was a crime against humanity and ordered Saravia to pay $10 million to the plaintiff, a relative of the Archbishop.

Chavez v. Carranza (Salvadoran Civil War crimes)

Filed on December 10, 2003, the suit aimed to hold Colonel Carranza responsible for human rights abuses committed in El Salvador.

In 2005, a Memphis federal jury found Colonel Nicolás Carranza, the former Vice-Minister of Defense of El Salvador, liable for overseeing torture and extrajudicial killings and ordered him to pay $6 million in compensatory and punitive damages.

Jesuits Massacre case

In 2008, CJA filed a criminal case in Spain against senior former Salvadoran military officials for their role in the 1989 Jesuits Massacre, in which six Jesuit Priests, their housekeeper and her daughter, were killed at the Universidad Centroamericana ¨José Simeon Cañas¨ (UCA) in El Salvador. On January 13, 2009, the 14 officers and soldiers named in the case were formally charged with crimes against humanity and state terrorism.

=== Guatemala ===
The Guatemala Genocide Case (The Mayan Genocide)

In 2004, CJA joined a criminal complaint filed in 1999 by Nobel Laureate Rigoberta Menchú Tum and others charging former President Efraín Ríos Montt and other senior Guatemalan officials with state terrorism, genocide and systematic torture during a campaign against the Mayan community which claimed over 200,000 lives. In 2006, a new legal team led by CJA began working with attorneys from Guatemala, the Netherlands, Spain and the U.S. to develop evidence on the Mayan genocide. As of 2009, CJA international staff attorney, Almudena Bernabeu is lead counsel for the plaintiffs.

=== Haiti ===
Jean v. Dorélien (The High Command and the Raboteau Massacre)

In 2003, CJA filed U.S. state and federal cases against Colonel Carl Dorélien—a Haitian officer who held command responsibility for the April 22, 1994 massacre in a pro-democracy neighborhood in Gonaïves and for the torture of the union activist Lexius Cajuste Dorélien's presence in the United States became widely known when he won $3.2 million in the Florida lottery in 1997.

In 2007, a Miami federal jury found Colonel Carl Dorélien liable for abuses and ordered him to pay $4.3 million. In a separate state court action, a landmark $580,000 was recovered for Haitian massacre survivors. In May 2008, over $400,000 was distributed to the Raboteau victims.

Doe v. Constant (Death squads and violence against women)

CJA represents three Haitian women in a lawsuit against Emmanuel "Toto" Constant for his participation in a range of human rights abuses committed in 1993–1994. On October 25, 2006, U.S. District Court Judge Sidney H. Stein of the Southern District of New York ordered Constant to pay $19 million in damages to CJA's clients.

In a separate criminal trial, Constant was sentenced on October 28, 2008, to 12 to 37 years in prison for his role in a criminal mortgage fraud scheme in New York. CJA's investigation of Constant contributed to this conviction.

=== Honduras ===
Reyes v. López Grijalba (Forced disappearance)

In July 2002 CJA filed a lawsuit against former military intelligence chief Lt. Col. Juan López Grijalba, who had command responsibility for the abduction, torture, and extrajudicial killing of the plaintiffs and plaintiffs' family-members. Having settled in the United States, López Grijalba was deported back to Honduras in 2004.

On March 31, 2006, a Florida judge held Colonel Grijalba responsible for abuses and ordered him to pay $47 million to six survivors and relatives of the disappeared.

Later in 2006, the Attorney General of Honduras approached CJA to assist in a criminal prosecution of López Grijalba based on evidence produced in the U.S. civil case. To initiate the prosecution, CJA trained 80 Honduran prosecutors on bringing successful human rights cases in national courts in December 2007.

=== Indonesia ===
Doe v. Lumintang (Atrocities during the East Timor Independence Referendum)

CJA and the Center for Constitutional Rights filed a lawsuit against General Johny Lumintang for abuses committed by the Indonesian military during the violent aftermath of the September 1999 independence referendum. Lumintang was served with the complaint while in transit at Dulles International Airport. In September 2001, he failed to appear in the case and District Judge Gladys Kessler found in favor of the survivors, awarding them $66 million in damages.

On November 9, 2004, District Judge Gladys Kessler granted Lumintang's motion to vacate the default judgment, holding that service of the complaint and summons at Dulles Airport in Fairfax, Virginia, did not give the District of Columbia district court jurisdiction over Lumintang.

=== Peru ===
Ochoa Lizarbe v. Hurtado (The Accomarca Massacre I)

In 2007, CJA filed suit against Major Telmo Hurtado Hurtado and Juan Rivera Rondón, who planned and executed a massacre of 69 civilians in the village of Accomarca, in the Ayacucho department of Peru on August 14, 1985.

On March 4, 2008, a federal court judge in Miami ordered Major Hurtado to pay $37 million in damages.

Ochoa Lizarbe v. Rivera Rondón (The Accomarca Massacre II)

In a related case, CJA and pro bono co-counsel Morgan, Lewis & Bockius LLP filed a lawsuit on July 11, 2007 in a Maryland federal district court against Rivera Rondón, a Peruvian former army lieutenant, for his role in the Accomarca Massacre.

Rivera Rondón immigrated to the U.S. in the early 1990s. Following a criminal conviction on a separate offence, Rondón was deported from the U.S. on August 15, 2008, whereupon he was immediately detained by Peruvian authorities. CJA was instrumental in ensuring that he will be prosecuted for the crimes he committed in Accomarca in 1985.

=== Somalia ===
Yousuf v. Samantar (Somali Civil War and Widespread Repression)

In 2004, CJA filed suit against General Mohamed Ali Samantar, the former Somali Minister of Defense (1980 to 1986) and Prime Minister (1987 to 1990) under the regime of Siad Barré. The suit alleges that Samantar bore command responsibility for a host of abuses carried out by his subordinates, including torture, extrajudicial killing and war crimes.

On April 27, 2007, Judge Brinkema of the Federal District Court for the Eastern District of Virginia dismissed the human rights lawsuit, ruling that the defendant enjoyed immunity from civil actions under the Foreign Sovereign Immunities Act (FSIA).

CJA and pro bono co-counsel from Cooley Godward Kronish LLP, appealed to the 4th Circuit Court. On January 8, 2009, the 4th Circuit reversed and remanded the district court's decision.

Doe v. Ali (Clan Violence and Torture)

On November 10, 2004 CJA filed a case against Colonel Yusuf Abdi Ali (a.k.a. Tokeh), a former officer in the Somali National Army during the military dictatorship of Siad Barré. Plaintiffs in the case are members of the Isaaq clan who suffered human rights abuses committed personally by Tokeh or by soldiers under his direct command.

The trial judge has referred the case to the State Department for its opinion.

Ahmed v. Magan

On April 21, 2010, CJA filed suit against Colonel Abdi Aden Magan, former Chief of the Somali National Security Service Department of Investigations during the military dictatorship of Siad Barré, on behalf of former law professor and human rights attorney Abukar Hassan Ahmed, who suffered brutal torture under Colonel Magan's orders.

The trial judge has referred the case to the State Department for its opinion.

=== United States ===
Reisner v. Leso

On July 7, 2010, CJA filed a complaint with the New York Office of the Professions on behalf of psychologist Dr. Steven Reisner against psychologist Dr. John Leso for his role in designing and implementing a system of abusive interrogations at United States Naval Station at Guantánamo Bay, Cuba.

=== Venezuela ===
Luis Posada Carriles Extradition

CJA represents the family of Raymond Persaud, a 19-year-old medical student killed aboard Cubana Flight 455, in the extradition request against Luis Posada Carriles. A Cuban-born former Venezuelan intelligence agent and paid CIA operative in the covert during the 1960s, Carriles is implicated in several anti-Castro terrorist attacks including the 1976 bombing that killed Persuad along with 73 other people.

In 2005, U.S. immigration authorities detained Carriles after he illegally entered the country. Carriles received an order for deportation on September 27, 2005. However, on May 8, 2007, the seven counts of immigration fraud were dismissed by U.S. district judge Kathleen Cardone.

Eventually, a federal appeals court reversed Judge Cardone's decision on 14 August 2008. As of January 2009, the U.S. government has refused to extradite Carriles on the grounds that the immigration proceedings are still ongoing.

== Transitional justice support ==
- Human rights training for Honduran prosecutors

At the invitation of the Honduran Attorney General, CJA conducted a training session, Prosecuting Human Rights Crimes in National Courts, on December 4–6, 2007, in Tegucigalpa, Honduras. The training brought together 80 Honduran prosecutors with a faculty of legal practitioners from Latin America, Spain and the U.S.

- Trial support for the Fujimori prosecution

The groundbreaking human rights trial against former Peruvian President Alberto Fujimori began in December 2007 in Lima. During Fujimori's tenure (1992–2000), Peru suffered a dramatic increase in human rights violations. CJA has entered into a co-counsel agreement with the Peruvian prosecution team and has provided assistance in litigation strategy and witness preparation.

- Assisting in the First Census of the Disappeared in Peru

CJA was appointed senior advisor to the Peruvian Institute of Forensic Anthropology (EPAF). EPAF conducts exhumations and investigations of massacres, forced disappearances and other human rights abuses. EPAF's findings have been crucial to the criminal investigations ongoing in Peru and the cases before the Inter-American Court of Human Rights. EPAF has also provided important evidence on the Accomarca Massacre to CJA for our Peru litigation.

== U.S. human rights policy, legislation & enforcement ==
In 2007 and 2008, CJA presented testimony before the Senate Judiciary Subcommittee on Human Rights and the Law.

- On November 14, 2007, CJA client Dr. Juan Romagoza Arce and CJA Executive Director Pamela Merchant testified in the hearing, "No Safe Haven: Accountability for Human Rights Violators". The hearing examined what could be done on the level of policy, legislation and enforcement to hold human rights abusers who have sought safe haven in the U.S. accountable.
- In June 2008, CJA submitted written testimony in the hearing "From Nuremberg to Darfur: Accountability for Crimes Against Humanity". In the testimony, Executive Director Pamela Merchant summarized the gaps in the current criminal human rights statutory framework and the importance of enacting crimes against humanity legislation for future prosecution of perpetrators.
