= Accomarca massacre =

1985 massacre in Accomarca, Peru

- Part of Internal conflict in Peru
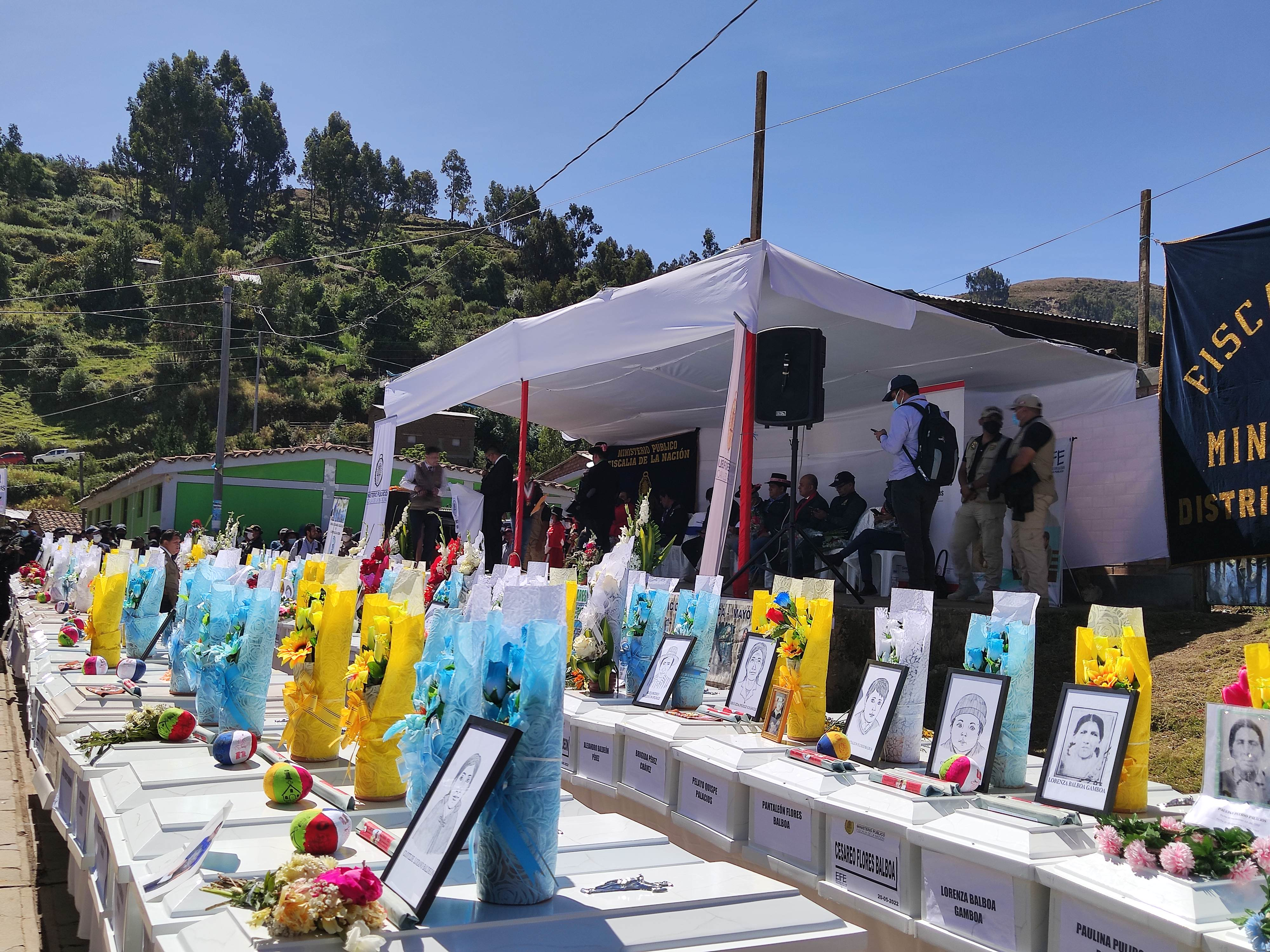
- Official ceremony on 20 May 2022, prior to the burial of Accomarca massacre victims, perpetrated by the Peruvian Army in August 1985, in Ayacucho region against disarmed civilians, Quechua-speaking peasants.
- Location: 13.1602°S 74.2151°W; Accomarca, Peru
- Date: 14 August 1985; 41 years ago
- Target: Peasants
- Attack type: Massacre
- Deaths: 47–74
- Perpetrator: Peruvian Army

The Accomarca massacre occurred on 14 August 1985, in the peasant village of Accomarca, now a neighbourhood of Ayacucho, Peru. There the Peruvian military massacred unarmed men, women and children. The official number of villagers killed is 69, but it has been variously reported as 47 or 74. It became known nationally as one of the most infamous examples of state terrorism and human rights violations by the Peruvian state during the country's 20 years of subversive insurgency (1980–2000).

According to the Center for Justice and Accountability, the massacre occurred as follows: "In August 1985, the Army’s Chief of the Political-Military Command for the “emergency zone” ordered one of his officers to devise an operational plan to “capture and/or destroy terrorist elements” in an area of Accomarca known as Quebrada de Huancayoc. A meeting was convened to discuss the plan that was attended by, among others, Second Lieutenant Telmo Hurtado Hurtado, Lieutenant Rivera Rondón and the commander of Lince Company, Major José Daniel Williams Zapata. At the meeting, the plans of the operation were laid out. Two units from Lince Company would be employed. Williams Zapata chose the Lince 6 patrol unit, commanded by Rivera Rondón, and Lince 7 unit, commanded by Hurtado, to carry out the operation. The attendees were told that any villager appearing in Quebrada de Huancayoc should be considered a communist terrorist.Then, on 14 August 1985, Lince 6 and Lince 7 entered Quebrada de Huancayoc. With Rivera Rondón’s troops blocking a nearby escape route, Hurtado and his soldiers went house to house forcibly removing villagers from their homes. The villagers were beaten with the butts of weapons and kicked with the heels of soldiers’ boots. They were lined-up single file and herded into houses of death, where Hurtado and his soldiers repeatedly shot ...family members, and then burned them alive amidst desperate screams for mercy. These acts were personally seen and heard by two 12-year old girls, Teófila Ochoa Lizarbe and Cirila Pulido Baldeón. In all, approximately 100 unarmed civilians were killed by the Army during the operation."

== Investigation ==
Telmo Hurtado Hurtado and Juan Rivera Rondón commanded the patrol units that executed the massacre. In 1993, Peruvian Army officer Telmo Ricardo Hurtado was convicted by the military justice system for abusing his authority and giving false statements in connection with his involvement in the massacre. However Hurtado was granted amnesty by the Peruvian government and never criminally convicted of the killings. When the amnesty was repealed in 2002 he fled to the United States. Whilst he was in custody for an immigration violation, two survivors brought a lawsuit against him for his role in the massacre. Their lawsuit accused the Peruvian military, who had been searching for members of the Shining Path rebel group, of carrying out extrajudicial killings, torture, war crimes and crimes against humanity. In 2008, a judge in Miami ruled that Hurtado was responsible for the massacre and ordered him to pay $37 million to the victims.

== See also ==
- List of massacres in Peru
