= Letelier-Moffitt Human Rights Award =

The Letelier-Moffitt Human Rights Award is awarded annually by the Washington, D.C.–based Institute for Policy Studies (IPS). It is awarded to those advancing the cause of human rights in the Americas. The Letelier-Moffitt Human Rights Award commemorates Orlando Letelier and Ronni Moffitt, who in 1976 were assassinated in Washington, D.C. by agents of the Chilean secret service. It was first presented in 1978.

== Award recipients ==
1978	Samuel Rubin Reverend Benjamin Chavis, Jr.
1979	The Association of Relatives of Disappeared People, Chile Alfred "Skip" Robinson, United League of Mississippi
1980	The Legal Aid Office of the Archdiocese of San Salvador Reverend William Wipfler, National Council of Churches
1981	Jacobo Timerman The Congregation of Maryknoll Sisters of St. Dominic
1982	Cardinal Paulo Evaristo Arns of São Paulo, Brazil The Infant Formula Action Coalition
1983	Center for Legal and Social Studies (CELS) of Argentina Father J. Bryan Hehir, U.S. Catholic Conference
1984	Dr. Ramón Custodio, President, Committee for the Defense of Human Rights in Honduras The Sanctuary Movement Reverend Charles Harper (Special Recognition Award)
1985	The Grupo de Apoyo Mutuo (GAM) of Guatemala The Free South Africa Movement Frances Arbour (Special Recognition Award)
1986	The Vicariate of Solidarity (Chile) Pete Seeger
1987	Bishop Mario Melanio Medina (Paraguay) Washington Office on Latin America
1988	Radio Soleil (Haiti) Charles L. Clements, M.D.
1989	The Union of Indigenous Nations of Brazil The National Labor Committee in Support of Democracy and Human Rights in El Salvador Robert Scherrer (Special Recognition Award)
1990	The National Human Rights Coordinating Committee of Peru Richard Trumka, President, United Mine Workers Union of America Father Jim Felts and Proyecto de Cristo Rey (Special Recognition Award)
1991	Jorge Gomez Lizarazo, President, Regional Committee for the Defense of Human Rights, Barrancabermeja, Colombia La Mujer Obrera, El Paso, Texas
1992	Evans Paul, Mayor of Port-au-Prince, Haiti Sam Buffone and Michael Tigar, lawyers for the Letelier-Moffitt Case Saul Landau (Special Recognition Award)
1993	Bishop Samuel Ruiz Garcia and Fray Bartolomé de las Casas Human Rights Center in Chiapas, Mexico Marian Kramer and the National Welfare Rights Union
1994	Harry Belafonte (Special Recognition Award) Coalition for Justice in the Maquiladoras Confederation of Indigenous Nationalities of Ecuador (CONAIE)
1995	Jennifer Harbury (Special Recognition Award) Rose Johnson, Georgia Project Director of the Center for Democratic Renewal Haitian Human Rights Platform
1996	Pharis Harvey (Special Recognition Award) Asian Immigrant Women Advocates Leo Valladares
1997	The Rev. Dr. Mac Charles Jones (Special Recognition Award, posthumously) Sin Fronteras Organizing Project Alianza Civica
1998	Rose Sanders Coordinacion Colombia-Europa
1999	Juan Garces Kensington Welfare Rights Union
2000	Oscar Olivera, Coordinator in Defense of Water and Life (Bolivia) November Coalition
2001	25th Anniversary (All prior recipients honored)
2002	Bishop Álvaro Ramazzini (Guatemala) Jobs with Justice Naúl Ojeda (Special Recognition Award, posthumously)
2003	Nancy Sanchez Mendez CASA de Maryland Luiz Inácio Lula da Silva (Special Recognition Award)
2004	Seymour Hersh Military Families Speak Out
2005	Judge Juan Guzmán Barrios Unidos
2006	Maher Arar and Center for Constitutional Rights Gulf Coast Renewal Campaign
2007	Senator Gustavo Petro (Colombia) Appeal for Redress DC Vote (Special Recognition Award)
2008	Francisco Soberón and the Asociación Pro-Derechos Humanos (Peru) Indian Workers Congress
2009	Domestic Workers United La Mesa Nacional Frente a la Minería Metálica en El Salvador
2010	National Day Laborer Organizing Network (NDLON) Honduras Human Rights Platform Guatemala National Police Archives
2011	Wisconsin Progressive Movement Bethlehem, The Migrant's Shelter (Mexico)
2012	City Life/Vida Urbana The Chilean Students Movement (Confederation of Chilean Students) (Chile)
2013	50th anniversary of IPS All prior recipients honored
2014	Robin Reineke of the Colibrí Center for Human Rights The Mesoamerican Initiative of Women Human Rights Defenders Juan E. Méndez (Special Recognition Award)
2015	Daryl Atkinson and the Southern Center for Social Justice Almudena Bernabeu and the Center for Justice and Accountability
2016	40th anniversary of the assassinations of Orlando Letelier and Ronni Karpen Moffitt (All prior recipients honored)
2017	Opal Tometi and the Black Alliance for Just Immigration (BAJI) Javier Rojas Uriana
2018	New Orleans Workers’ Center for Racial Justice Derechos Humanos y Medio Ambiente (DHUMA)
