= A Child of the Ghetto =

1910 silent film

- Complete film
- Directed by: D. W. Griffith
- Written by: D. W. Griffith
- Production company: Biograph Company
- Distributed by: Biograph Company
- Release date: 1910
- Running time: 16 minutes
- Country: United States
- Language: Silent (English intertitles)

A Child of the Ghetto is a 1910 American silent short drama film directed by D. W. Griffith. The story features a seamstress in New York City.

According to Richard Brody's The New Yorker article "Babel on the Hudson", the protagonist is Jewish and her boyfriend a Gentile. The National Center for Jewish Film states that this is "one of the earliest films to treat an interfaith romance unproblematically."

== Plot ==
When Ruth's mother dies, the young woman is left all alone on the Lower East Side of New York City. Her landlady demands the rent, so she finds work at the second shop she tries, as a seamstress. However, her employer's son steals money from his wallet when his back is turned. When the theft is quickly discovered, the son frames Ruth, planting the money in the bundle of clothing she has repaired and pretending to find it. Ruth manages to run away, but the victim sends for a policeman. The policeman knocks on Ruth's door, then breaks in when she refuses to open it. She flees out the window and takes a streetcar out into the countryside before fainting.

A farmer finds her and takes her inside, where she is treated well by him and his wife. She meets a young man who is attracted to her, and her mood greatly improves.

The policeman goes fishing. When he goes for water for some coffee, he encounters Ruth at the farm's well. Later, he realizes she is the one accused of theft. The relationship between Ruth and the young man progresses swiftly; they embrace, and he kisses her on the cheek, before they walk away, hand in hand. The policeman resumes fishing with a smile on his face.

== Cast ==
- Dorothy West as Ruth
- Kate Bruce as Ruth's mother
- Dell Henderson as the proprietor
- Charles West as the proprietor's son
- W. Chrystie Miller as the old man
- George Nichols as Officer Quinn
- Henry B. Walthall as the farmer
- Clara T. Bracy as the farm woman
- Francis J. Grandon as the doctor
- Frank Evans as the policeman
- William J. Butler in second shop
- Charles Craig in sweatshop
- Gladys Egan as the flower girl
- Ruth Hart in second shop
- Guy Hedlund in sweatshop
- Henry Lehrman in sweatshop
- Anthony O'Sullivan in sweatshop
- Alfred Paget in second shop

== Production ==
D. W. Griffith progressed from the 13 shots he used in Romance of a Jewess two years before to the 46 shots of this film.
