= Citizen Change =

Political service group

Citizen Change is a political service group, founded in 2004 by rapper Sean Combs, and backed by musical artists Mary J. Blige, Mariah Carey and 50 Cent. The stated aim was to get young people and minorities to vote.

== History ==
The campaign's message, promoted on t-shirts and other things, is "Vote or Die!", a phrase adapted from Join, or Die, a well-known cartoon by Benjamin Franklin.

=== 2004 United States presidential election ===
Combs said at the time that its mission was to make voting "hot" and "sexy." The 2004 campaign included a line of "Vote or Die" t-shirts, an album, a voter registration push in cities and campuses nationwide, and commercials on such outlets as MTV and BET.

=== 2008 United States presidential election ===
Combs invoked the phrase, "Obama or Die", at the BET Awards 2008.

== In popular culture ==
- In the South Park episode "Douche and Turd", Combs and his associates chase Stan Marsh around with weapons and literally threaten to kill him if Stan does not vote.
- In 2012, the "Vote or Die!" t-shirt concept was resurrected for the Democratic National Convention in the form of parody "Vote Obama" t-shirts.
