= Megan Williams case =

Criminal case in the United States

The Megan Williams case involves a 20-year-old African American woman from West Virginia, who was kidnapped, raped and tortured by six people, including several members of one family in a racist attack.

Among other things, the suspects were charged with stabbing Williams, dousing her with hot water, and forcing her to eat rat, dog, and human feces. In addition, the suspects were alleged to have hurled racial slurs at her while doing so. The torture and sexual assault were said to have been carried out for about a week. At the time of Williams' removal from the residence, widely circulated photos of Williams in the hospital showed stab wounds on her legs and her hair seemingly pulled from its roots.

Civil rights leaders, community activists and others asserted that the racial motive made the incident subject to prosecution under hate crimes statutes. Authorities did not initially file hate crime charges in the attack, but prosecutors did not rule out such a move down the road. When pressed on the possibility of such charges, authorities said that they were focused on the charges with the toughest penalties, noting that the maximum sentence for a hate crime was just 10 years. One defendant was convicted of a hate crime in the incident.

In October 2009, Williams recanted many of the accusations, including the accusation that the attack was racially motivated, against five of the defendants. However, she maintained that she was held against her will, sexually and physically abused, accusing Bobby Ray Brewster, whom Williams knew and had visited on occasion before the incident, of abuse. She was not charged with filing false charges.

The Brewsters and others present in the house during the time Williams claimed to have been held, individually have various criminal records - including Bobby's mother, Frankie Brewster, who pleaded to manslaughter of an 84-year-old woman in 1994.

== Background ==
Williams had a "social relationship" with Bobby Ray Brewster, one of the six initial suspects. Brewster was previously arrested on July 18, 2008, in connection with a domestic battery charge involving Williams. According to investigators, Williams may have been kidnapped immediately after he was released from jail on August 2, when Williams visited his home to see him.

== Megan Williams' account of events and legal case ==
Williams claimed she was set up to be held by the six suspects under the assumption that she was going to a party. "When I first went up there, a girl I knew named Christa, she took me up there, she said we were going to a party. She said she had to make a run and she would be right back. She didn’t come back."

Bobby Ray Brewster and five other suspects including his mother, Frankie Lee, 49, Danny Combs, 20, George Messer, 27, Karen Burton, 46, and her daughter Alisha, 23 were all charged with kidnapping, the most serious charge that can carry up to life in prison upon conviction. They were all also charged with at least one count each of first-degree sexual offense, which if convicted, could carry a sentence of up to 35 years in prison.

On October 11, 2007, charges against Karen Burton were sent to a grand jury. Charges included kidnapping, first degree sexual assault, malicious wounding, assault during the commission of a felony and 13 counts of battery. Charges against the other five suspects are expected to reach the grand jury in January.

In February 2008, Alisha Burton and George Messer both pleaded guilty to assault and kidnapping and were sentenced to 10 years each.

On March 13, 2008, Karen Burton, one of the women involved in the attack, was given one 10-year sentence for violation of civil rights and two 2-10 year sentences for assault. She was the only person involved who was charged with a hate crime. Frankie Brewster received 10–25 years for second-degree sexual assault. They had both pleaded guilty in exchange for reduced sentences. Carmen Williams, Megan's mother, expressed frustration that they had not received life sentences, which is the maximum penalty for kidnapping.

Bobby Brewster pleaded guilty to second-degree sexual assault, conspiracy to commit kidnapping and malicious assault. He was sentenced to 13 to 40 years in prison in July 2008. Danny Combs will serve 20 years for conspiracy to commit kidnapping. He pleaded guilty to sexual assault, assault during the commission of a felony, and conspiracy to commit kidnapping or holding hostage in September 2008.

As of October 21, 2009, Williams recanted her story saying none of the abuse or kidnapping took place. Former Logan County prosecutor Brian Abraham called the recantation absurd.

Williams' current attorney Byron L. Potts said Williams now claims she lied in 2007 because she wanted to get back at her boyfriend, Bobby Brewster. Potts called on the prosecutors to reconsider the case. Brian Abraham, the prosecutor in the case, said his team realized in 2007 that they could not rely on statements by Williams who tended to embellish and exaggerate and built their case instead on statements by the defendants and on the physical evidence. Williams was not charged with filing false charges.
