= Antonique Smith =

American actress and singer (born 1983)

- Smith at the 2026 New York Film Festival

Background information
- Born: August 11, 1983 (age 43); East Orange, New Jersey, U.S.
- Genres: R&B, pop, musicals
- Occupations: Singer, actress
- Years active: 2002–present
- Website: www.antonique.com

Antonique Smith (born August 11, 1983) is an American film, television and Broadway actress and Grammy Nominated singer.

== Life and career ==
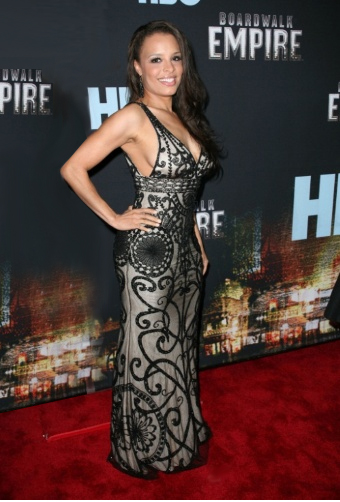

Smith was born in East Orange, New Jersey. She attended Eastern Christian High School in North Haledon, New Jersey.

Smith starred as Mimi in Jonathan Larson's Broadway production of Rent. She was also the poster girl for Rent, displayed on taxi cabs in New York City and posters across the country. She left the role of Mimi to record her album and expand her film career.

Smith made her television debut in Sidney Lumet's 100 Centre Street, playing a teen drug addict.

Smith played Faith Evans in Notorious, based on the life of Evans' late husband, rapper The Notorious B.I.G. She received rave reviews. Critic Jeffery Lyons called her “one to watch.” The Los Angeles Times called her "delicious in the role", while Rolling Stone said she was "terrific".

Smith played CIA agent Sandra Burns in the action movie Abduction with Taylor Lautner and Alfred Molina. In the same year she played Ola O' Hara in the film Yelling to the Sky with Zoe Kravitz and Gabourey Sidibe and Jason Clarke. She had a role in the Golden Globe-nominated film Across the Universe and has guest starred on Law & Order and HBO's Bored to Death.

She starred in the TV One romantic comedy Stock Option, which premiered to record ratings for the network. She appeared in the Netflix film Deuces and in the FOX drama series Shots Fired, executive produced by Brian Grazer and Gina Prince-Bythewood and starring Sanaa Lathan, Richard Dreyfuss, Helen Hunt, and Stephen Moyer. She starred in season 2 of the hit Netflix series Marvel's Luke Cage. She also starred in season 3 of the NatGeo anthology series Genius, titled Genius: Aretha, playing the role of Aretha Franklin’s mother Barbara Franklin opposite Courtney B Vance and Cynthia Erivo.

Smith is also a passionate environmentalist with a focus on climate and environmental justice. She appeared on the first ever album about climate change titled H.O.M.E. (Heal Our Mother Earth). She was on the Act on Climate tour with the Hip Hop Caucus and sang for the Pope's climate rally in Washington, D.C. and many other events over the years. Smith was dubbed the voice of the climate movement by Bill McKibben. She was also the voice of Virgin Mobile USA.

=== Music ===
The rapper Nas mentioned Smith on his single "Nasty" that appears on his 2012 album Life Is Good. She made a cameo in the video for that song. Smith starred in Rick Ross' "Amsterdam" music video which got over 8 million views in its first two days of release.

Smith released her debut single, "Hold Up Wait a Minute (Woo Woo)" on 9:23 Music Group. The video was directed by Larenz Tate and co-stars actor Lance Gross and social media star King Bach and was released on December 2, 2014 on Essence Online. The single was nominated for a Grammy Award for Best Traditional R&B Performance at the 57th Annual Grammy Awards.

In 2015 she released the EP Love Is Everything, which was funded by Kickstarter in 2012 and raised over $50,000 in 30 days from her fans.

She co-wrote her Grammy-nominated single and also the single and theme song for the television show Shots Fired along with other original songs that appeared on the show and vocalized on the score in the riot scene of Episode 6 composed by Terence Blanchard.

== Filmography ==
=== Film ===
Year	Title	Role	Notes
2007	Across the Universe	Hooker	
2009	Notorious	Faith Evans	
2011	Yelling to the Sky	Ola O'Hara	
2011	The Sculptor	Eleanor	Short
2011	Abduction	Burns	
2015	Boxed in	Megan	Short
2015	Stock Option	Alina	
2017	Deuces	Tanya	
2019	Everyday But Christmas	Deanna	
2025	Wish You Were Here	Nurse Leah	

=== Television ===
Year	Title	Role	Notes
2002	100 Centre Street	-	Recurring cast: season 2
2003	Law & Order	Gina	Episode: "Under God"
2009	Bored to Death	Barista	Episode: "The Case of the Stolen Sperm"
2017	Shots Fired	Kiana Ward	Recurring cast
2018	Chicago P.D.	Detective Rachael Rojas	Episode: "Payback"
2018	Luke Cage	Detective Nandi Tyler	Recurring cast: Season 2
2020	Sacred Lies	Wendy Spellman	Recurring cast: season 2
2021	Genius	Barbara Siggers Franklin	Recurring cast: season 3
2022	Tales	Cheryl Jackson	Episode: "Ms. Jackson"

=== Music videos ===
Year	Title	Artist	Ref.
2012	"Amsterdam"	Rick Ross	
2014	"Imagine" (UNICEF: World version)	Various	

=== Broadway ===
Year	Title	Role	Notes
2005–2007	Rent	Mimi Marquez	
