= John Casey (novelist) =

American novelist (1939–2025)

John D. Casey
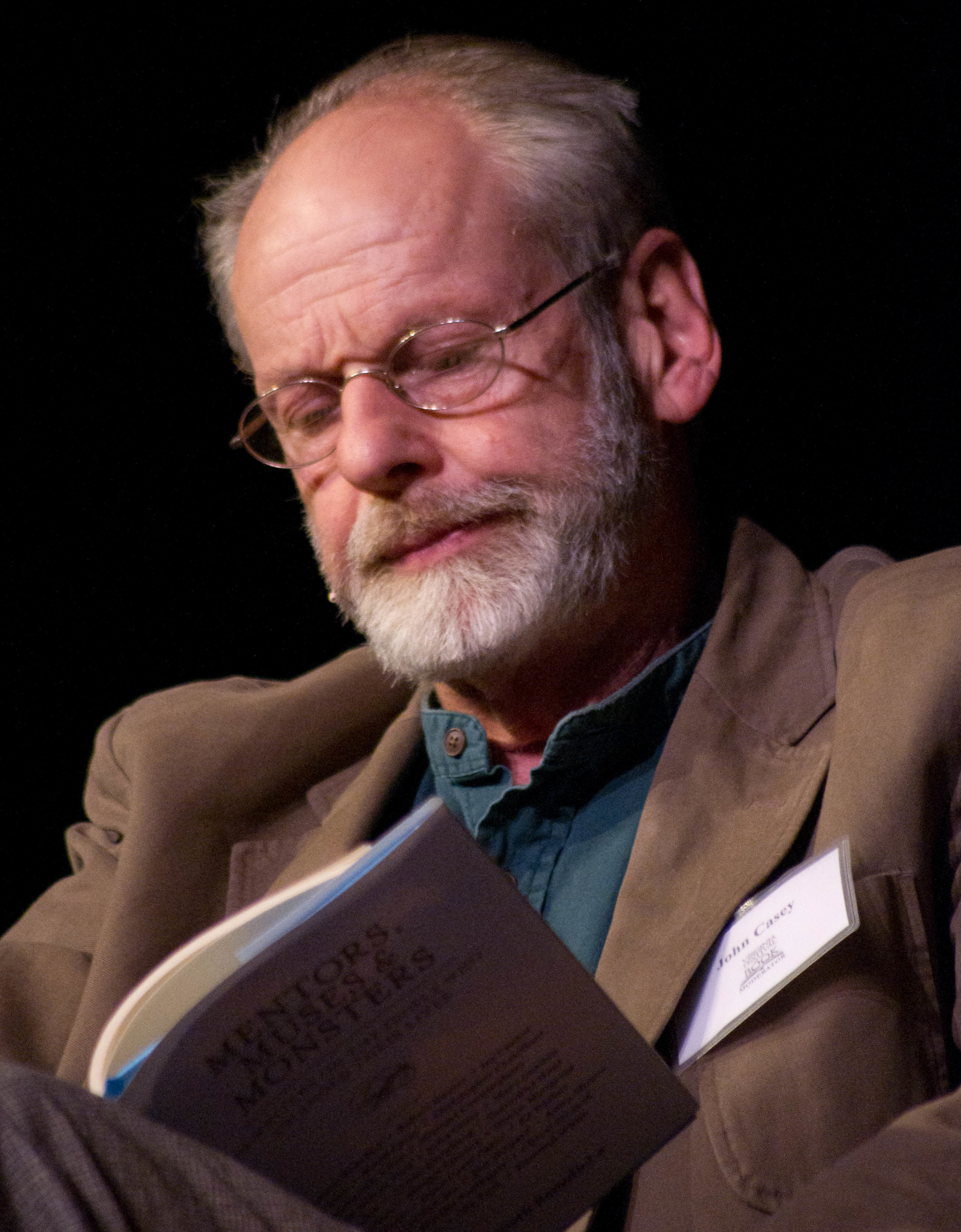
- Casey in 2010
- Born: January 18, 1939; Worcester, Massachusetts, U.S.
- Died: February 22, 2025 (aged 86); Charlottesville, Virginia, U.S.
- Occupation: Author
- Spouses: Jane Barnes; Rosamond Casey; Roberts (Robin) Browning Carey
- Children: 4, including Maud
- Relatives: Joseph E. Casey (father); Alex Kuczynski (niece)
- Writing career
- Period: 1977–2010
- Notable works: Spartina, 1989

John Dudley Casey (January 18, 1939 – February 22, 2025) was an American novelist and translator. He won the U.S. National Book Award for Fiction in 1989 for Spartina.

== Background ==
Casey was born in Worcester, Massachusetts, on January 18, 1939. His father was Joseph E. Casey, who served in the U.S. House of Representatives.

He was educated at Harvard College, Harvard Law School, and the Iowa Writers' Workshop at the University of Iowa, where he was mentored by Kurt Vonnegut and his classmates included John Irving and Gail Godwin. While at Iowa, he sold three short stories to The New Yorker.

Casey moved to Charlottesville, Virginia, to take a job teaching at the University of Virginia in 1972. He died from dementia at his Charlottesville home, on February 22, 2025, at the age of 86. Among others, writer Breece D'J Pancake studied under him.

Casey's papers reside at the Albert and Shirley Small Special Collections Library at the University of Virginia.

=== Family ===
Casey's brother-in-law is Nobel Prize-winning physician Harold E. Varmus.

Casey had two adult daughters from his first marriage to novelist Jane Barnes: Nell Casey and Maud Casey. Maud is a published author in her own right, with two well-reviewed novels and a collection of short stories to her credit. Nell Casey is the editor of the essay collection Unholy Ghost on depression and creativity, including essays by herself and her sister, and editor of a second essay collection, An Uncertain Inheritance, by contributors caring for family through illness and death.

He also had two daughters, Clare and Julia, from his second marriage to artist and calligrapher Rosamond Casey, whom he married in 1982.

In 2012, John Casey married social media executive Roberts Browning Fray (who went by Robin Fray Carey professionally), whom he first met when she studied English at UVA in 1976. Casey was widowed on December 17, 2015, when Robin Fray Carey was killed in an automobile accident in Fauquier County, Virginia.

Casey was the uncle of journalist and writer Alex Kuczynski, whose parents are his sister Jane and his former brother-in-law Pedro Pablo Kuczynski, who was President of Peru from 2016 to 2018.

== Title IX complaints ==
In November 2017, Casey was accused of sexually harassing Emma C. Eisenberg, a graduate of the University of Virginia's M.F.A. program. A second anonymous M.F.A. student filed an additional Title IX complaint at the same time. Several weeks later, a third student, Sharon Harrigan, accused Casey of sexual harassment and gender bias. On November 30, 2017, the university's Office for Equal Opportunity and Civil Rights announced that Casey would not be teaching during the spring 2018 semester, nor would he be advising or mentoring students.

In December 2018, a UVA investigation found sufficient evidence that Casey kissed and inappropriately touched a female undergraduate student in 2001. The investigator also found that, "nearly 30 years ago" (approximately 1989), Casey made a sexual advance toward one of his female graduate students. Ultimately, the disciplinary panel determined that Casey was "unfit for continued teaching responsibilities" and made a unanimous recommendation to terminate his employment. However, Casey retired before the sanction could be carried out.

In March 2019, Casey was found responsible for additional Title IX violations in a separate UVA investigation. Among the supported allegations, Casey used the word "cunt" while teaching, called a student a "sexy Irish pirate", commented regularly on female students' appearances, and showed up uninvited to a female student's house and "was overly critical and hostile to her when she rebuffed him". The panel recommended that Casey be permanently banned from UVA property and made ineligible for paid or unpaid UVA employment.

== Awards ==
- 1989 National Book Award for his novel Spartina
- 1991 Rome Prize
- 1993 "Mildred and Harold Strauss Living" Award from the American Academy of Arts and Letters

== Works ==
=== Fiction ===
- An American Romance, Atheneum (1977) ISBN 978-0-689-10770-2
- Testimony and Demeanor, Knopf (1979) ISBN 978-0-394-50097-3
- Spartina, Knopf (1989) ISBN 978-0-394-50098-0
- Supper at the Black Pearl, Lord John Press (1996) ISBN 978-0-935716-65-8
- The Half-Life of Happiness, Knopf (1998) ISBN 978-0-375-70608-0
- Compass Rose, Knopf, (2010) ISBN 978-0-375-41025-3

=== Non-fiction ===
- Room For Improvement: Notes on a Dozen Lifelong Sports, Knopf (2011) ISBN 9780307700025
- Beyond the First Draft: The Art of Fiction, W. W. Norton & Company (2014) ISBN 978-0-393-24108-2

=== Translations ===
- Alessandro Boffa (2002). You're an Animal, Viskovitz!. Translator John Casey. Random House, Inc. ISBN 978-0-375-40528-0.
- Linda Ferri (2006). Enchantments. Translator John Casey. Vintage. ISBN 978-1-4000-3352-2.
