= Courtenay Crocker =

American attorney and politician

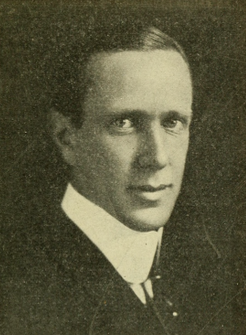

Member of the Massachusetts House of Representatives
- In office 1910–1914

Personal details
- Born: February 4, 1881
- Died: December 16, 1944 (aged 63)
- Party: Republican
- Parent: George G. Crocker (father)
- Education: Harvard University

Courtenay Crocker (February 4, 1881 – December 16, 1944) was an American attorney and politician. A member of the Republican Party, he served in the Massachusetts House of Representatives from 1910 to 1914. He served as an advisor to King of Siam Rama VII on foreign affairs from 1924 to 1926.

== Early life ==
Crocker was born on February 4, 1881, to George G. Crocker and Annie Bliss (Keep) Crocker. His father was an attorney and politician who served in the Massachusetts legislature. He graduated from Harvard College in 1901 and Harvard Law School in 1905.

== Political career ==
In 1908, Crocker was elected to the Boston Common Council. He was reelected in 1909. From 1910 to 1914, Crocker was a member of the Massachusetts House of Representatives. He served as chairman of the House Ways and Means committee. In 1917 he was appointed to the Massachusetts Civil Service Commission by Governor Samuel McCall.

From 1910 to 1912, Crocker was the secretary of the Republican Club of Massachusetts. From 1914 to 1917 he served as the club's president. He later served as its vice president. He resigned from the club in 1920 due to the party's stance against the League of Nations. He supported Democrat Channing H. Cox in that year's gubernatorial election. In 1924 Cox appointed Crocker to the Public Safety Committee.

== Advisor to foreign governments ==
From 1924 to 1926, Crocker was an advisor to the King of Siam. He advised Rama VII on foreign affairs in cooperation with foreign minister Prince Traidos Prabandh. Crocker succeeded Francis Bowes Sayre Sr. in this position. Upon his return to Boston he served as president of the Japan Society of Boston. In 1929 he succeeded Cox as Honorary Consul of Japan in Boston.

== U.S. Senate campaign ==
In 1942, Crocker returned to the Republican Party and announced his candidacy for the United States Senate. Massachusetts Secretary of State Frederic W. Cook ruled that Crocker was ineligible to run in the Republican primary because he was not a registered Republican for at least 30 days before filing his nomination papers, however Suffolk Superior Court Judge John V. Spalding ordered Cook to place Crocker on the ballot. Crocker lost the primary to the incumbent Henry Cabot Lodge Jr. and supported the Democratic nominee, Joseph E. Casey in the general election.

== Death ==
Crocker died on December 16, 1944, at his home in Boston.
