= First Ladies and Gentlemen of Peru =

Title of spouse of Peruvian president

First Lady or First Gentleman of Peru
- Primera dama del Perú
- Incumbent; Vacant since 28 July 2026
- Style: Her/His Excellency (Diplomatic, outside Peru)
- Residence: Palacio de Gobierno

The first lady or gentleman of Peru (Spanish: primera dama o primer caballero del Perú) is the title held by the spouse or designated female family member of the president of Peru. The role usually fulfills functions of social work and accompanying the president. There have been a number of first ladies that have been foreign to Peru.

== History ==
The first pioneer of political leadership in Peru was María Delgado de Odría, wife of President Manuel A. Odría, who developed extensive social work throughout the country aimed at those who needed it most.

In September 1919, Julia Swayne y Mariátegui, wife of Augusto B. Leguía (who had assumed the presidency in July of that year), died in London, unable to accompany her husband during the eleven years that he ruled.

In 1956, President Manuel Prado Ugarteche asked the Roman Rota to annul his marriage to Enriqueta Garland Higginson, who had already been first lady, which led a group of Catholic society ladies to go out dressed in mourning through the streets of Lima. The president remarried the socialite Clorinda Málaga Bravo in 1958, and until then the position was assumed by his daughter, Rosa Prado Garland de Parks.

In 1963, Fernando Belaúnde Terry assumed the presidency of the Republic, but the position of first lady was assumed by his sister Lucila Belaúnde de Cruchaga and by her daughter Carolina Belaúnde on some occasions, since the president was divorced from Carola Aubry. However, in 1966, on the occasion of the visit of Charles de Gaulle, the position was assumed by Carmen Jaime Torres, wife of the president of the Senate, Ramiro Prialé, interpreting the Congress that since the president of the Executive lacked a wife, the position should be assumed. by the wife of the President of the Legislative Assembly.

One first lady who dedicated a lot of effort to welfare work was Violeta Correa, the second wife of Belaúnde Terry, who developed a series of actions with well-known Peruvian women, being also the creator of the so-called "family kitchens."

Pilar Nores, Alan García's wife, created in the eighties the Foundation for the Children of Peru, an institution dedicated to children in need and that would later be presided over by future first ladies. Susana Higuchi, Alberto Fujimori's wife, took over this foundation until her separation from her husband. After that, her daughter Keiko Fujimori took office at the age of 19, becoming the youngest first lady in the world.

Eliane Karp, wife of President Alejandro Toledo, served as First Lady and president of the previously mentioned Foundation for the Children of Peru. In 2002 the Office of the First Lady was created, from which she would support charitable causes. This office was dissolved by the government of Alan García in August 2006. After Nores and García's divorce was made public, his daughters, Carla and Josefina, became the ones who accompanied him to official events.

=== Corruption scandals ===
Much like their husbands, a number of first ladies of Peru have been implicated with charges of corruption under their spouse's administration.

==== Eliane Karp de Toledo ====
Eliane Karp, the wife of President Alejandro Toledo, has been accused of money laundering. She testified under Congress in 2013.

==== Nadine Heredia de Humala ====
Nadine Heredia, the wife of president Ollanta Humala was accused of multiple crimes, and was arrested one year following Humala's administration and sent to testify under oath.

== List ==
No.	Portrait	Name	Tenure	President (Husband or wife, unless noted)
1	N/A	María Ana Micaela de Echevarría y Santiago de Ulloa ?–?	17 July 1823 – 17 February 1824	José Bernardo de Tagle
2		Francisca Zubiaga y Bernales; September 11, 1803–May 8, 1835	September 1, 1829 – December 20, 1833	Agustín Gamarra
3	N/A	María Josefa Martínez de Pinillos y Cacho ?–?	April 24, 1834 – February 23, 1835	Luis José de Orbegoso
4	N/A	Juana Pérez Palza de Infantas; May 27, 1808–March 18, 1888	25 February 1835 – 7 February 1836	Felipe Santiago Salaverry
5	N/A	Andrea Grados Donayre; 1807–October 16, 1851	October 20, 1842 – March 15, 1843	Juan Francisco de Vidal
6		Francisca Diez-Canseco y Corbacho; January 13, 1823–May 31, 1864	April 20, 1845 – April 20, 1851	Ramón Castilla
7	N/A	Victoria Tristán de Echenique; January 13, 1823–May 31, 1864	April 20, 1851 – January 5, 1855	José Rufino Echenique
8	N/A	Josefa Oviedo y Mollinedo ?–?	October 24, 1862 – April 3, 1863	Miguel de San Román
9		Francisca Diez-Canseco y Corbacho; January 13, 1823–May 31, 1864	April 3, 1863 – April 9, 1863	Ramón Castilla
10	N/A	Juana de Tirado y Coronel-Zegarra; June 20, 1807–November 20, 1882	August 5, 1863 – November 8, 1865	Juan Antonio Pezet
11	N/A	María Magdalena Ugarteche Gutiérrez de Cossío; May 20, 1842–July 9, 1917	November 28, 1865 – January 7, 1868	Mariano Ignacio Prado
12	N/A	Francisca Javiera Vargas Maldonado; December 1, 1818–April 16, 1879	January 7, 1868 – August 2, 1868	Pedro Diez Canseco
13	N/A	María Paz y Graj ?–?	2 August 1868 – 22 July 1872	José Balta
14	N/A	Manuela Sanz de Santo Domingo; August 31, 1838–?	July 27, 1872 – August 2, 1872	Mariano Herencia Zevallos
15	N/A	Mariana Barreda y Osma; August 31, 1838–?	August 2, 1872 – August 2, 1876	Manuel Pardo y Lavalle
16	N/A	María Magdalena Ugarteche Gutiérrez de Cossío; May 20, 1842–July 9, 1917	August 2, 1876 – December 23, 1879	Mariano Ignacio Prado
17	N/A	Manuela Molina; 1820–March 10, 1890	December 18, 1879 – December 23, 1879	Luis La Puerta
18	N/A	Jesusa de Itúrbide Y Villena c. 1842–February 17, 1914	December 23, 1879 – November 28, 1881	Nicolás de Piérola
19		Carmen Rey y Basadre; May 9, 1850–?	March 12, 1881 – September 28, 1881	Francisco García Calderón
20	N/A	Rosa Elías de la Quintana; October 8, 1829–February 7, 1888	September 28, 1881 – November 6, 1881	Lizardo Montero Flores
21		Antonia Moreno Leyva; June 13, 1848–February 26, 1916	June 3, 1886 – August 10, 1890	Andrés Avelino Cáceres
22		Justa Masías y Llosa; 1849–1925	August 10, 1890 – April 1, 1894	Remigio Morales Bermúdez
23	N/A	Jesús Salas de la Torre Urraca ?–?	1 April 1894 – 10 August 1894	Justiniano Borgoño
24		Antonia Moreno Leyva; June 13, 1848–February 26, 1916	August 10, 1894 – March 20, 1895	Andrés Avelino Cáceres
25	N/A	Teresa Álvarez-Calderón Roldán de Candamo; 1851–?	March 20, 1895 – September 8, 1895	Manuel Candamo
26	N/A	Carmen Heeren Barreda; 1879–1949	August 18, 1915 – July 4, 1919	José Pardo y Barreda
27	N/A	María Isabel Olivera Mayo de Leguía; 1867–?	July 4, 1919 – December 8, 1930	Augusto B. Leguía
28	N/A	Francisca Benavides Diez Canseco de Benavides; 1886–?	April 30, 1933 – December 8, 1939	Óscar R. Benavides
29		Enriqueta Garland de Prado; May 11, 1883 – April 30, 1968 (aged 84)	December 8, 1939 – July 28, 1945	Manuel Prado Ugarteche
30	N/A	María Jesús Rivera y Rivera de Bustamante ?–?	July 28, 1945 – October 29, 1948	José Luis Bustamante y Rivero
31		María Delgado de Odría; December 28, 1900 – March 19, 1990 (aged 89)	October 29, 1948 – July 28, 1956	Manuel Odría Amoretti
32	N/A	Rosa Prado Garland; 1924–2007	July 28, 1956 – June 9, 1958	Manuel Prado Ugarteche; Daughter
32		Clorinda Málaga de Prado; July 3, 1905 – September 17, 1993 (aged 88)	June 9, 1958 – July 18, 1962	Manuel Prado Ugarteche
33	N/A	Eloisa Dolores Ferreyros Roldán de Godoy; Born N/A	July 18, 1962 – March 3, 1963	Ricardo Pérez Godoy
34	N/A	María Álvarez del Villar de Lindley; Born N/A	March 3, 1963 – July 28, 1963	Nicolás Lindley López
35	N/A	Carola Aubry Bravo de Belaúnde; 1921–2003 (aged 81–82)	July 28, 1963 – October 3, 1968	Fernando Belaúnde Terry
36		Consuelo Gonzales Posada de Velasco; June 18, 1920 – September 7, 2012 (aged 92)	October 3, 1968 – August 29, 1975	Juan Velasco Alvarado
37	N/A	Rosa Pedraglio de Morales Bermúdez; February 1, 1920 – June 7, 1998 (aged 78)	August 29, 1975 – July 28, 1980	Francisco Morales Bermúdez
38	N/A	Violeta Correa de Belaúnde; March 24, 1927 – June 1, 2001 (aged 74)	July 28, 1980 – July 28, 1985	Fernando Belaúnde Terry
39		Pilar Nores de García; Born 11 March 1949 (age 77); Birth country: Argentina	July 28, 1985 – July 28, 1990	Alan Garcia
40		Susana Higuchi de Fujimori; April 26, 1950 – December 8, 2021 (aged 71)	July 28, 1990 – August 23, 1994	Alberto Fujimori
40		Keiko Fujimori Higuchi; Born May 25, 1975 (age 51)	August 23, 1994 – November 22, 2000	Alberto Fujimori; Daughter
41	N/A	Nilda Jara de Paniagua; Born November 27, 1942 (age 83)	November 22, 2000 – July 28, 2001	Valentin Paniagua
42	Portrait of Eliane Karp	Eliane Karp de Toledo; Born September 24, 1953 (age 72); Birth country: France	July 28, 2001 – July 28, 2006	Alejandro Toledo
43	Portrait of Pilar Nores de García	Pilar Nores de García (Note: After her separation with her husband was made public, their daughters Carla and Josefina became unofficial first ladies, accompanying their father to official events.); Born March 11, 1949 (age 77); Birth country: Argentina	July 28, 2006 – July 28, 2011	Alan Garcia
44	Portrait of Nadine Heredia	Nadine Heredia de Humala; Born May 25, 1976 (age 50)	July 28, 2011 – July 28, 2016	Ollanta Humala
45	Portrait of Nancy Lange	Nancy Lange Kuczynski; Born January 20, 1954 (age 72); Birth country: United States	July 28, 2016 – March 23, 2018	Pedro Pablo Kuczynski
46	Photograph of Maribel Díaz Cabello	Maribel Diaz de Vizcarra; Born March 27, 1970 (age 56)	March 23, 2018 – November 10, 2020	Martin Vizcarra
47	N/A	Mary Peña de Merino; Born November 17, 1963 (age 62)	November 10, 2020 – November 15, 2020	Manuel Merino
48		Lilia Paredes de Castillo; Born April 23, 1973 (age 53)	July 28, 2021 – December 7, 2022	Pedro Castillo
49	N/A	Blanca Quiroz de Balcázar; Born October 10, 1946 (age 79)	18 February 2026 – 28 July 2026	José María Balcázar

== See also ==
- Presidents of Peru
