= Vilca =

Vilca may refer to:

- Vilca, a common name for Anadenanthera colubrina
- Vilca District, a district in Huancavelica, Peru

== People with the surname ==
- Alejandro Vilca (born 1976), Argentine politician
- Marco Vilca (born 2000), Peruvian middle-distance runner
- María Luisa Vilca (born 1948), Peruvian sprinter
- Rodrigo Vilca (born 1999), Peruvian footballer
- Susana Vilca (born 1959), Peruvian politician

== See also ==
- Vilcha (disambiguation)
