= Maribel Díaz Cabello =

Peruvian teacher

Maribel Díaz Cabello gcYC GCM
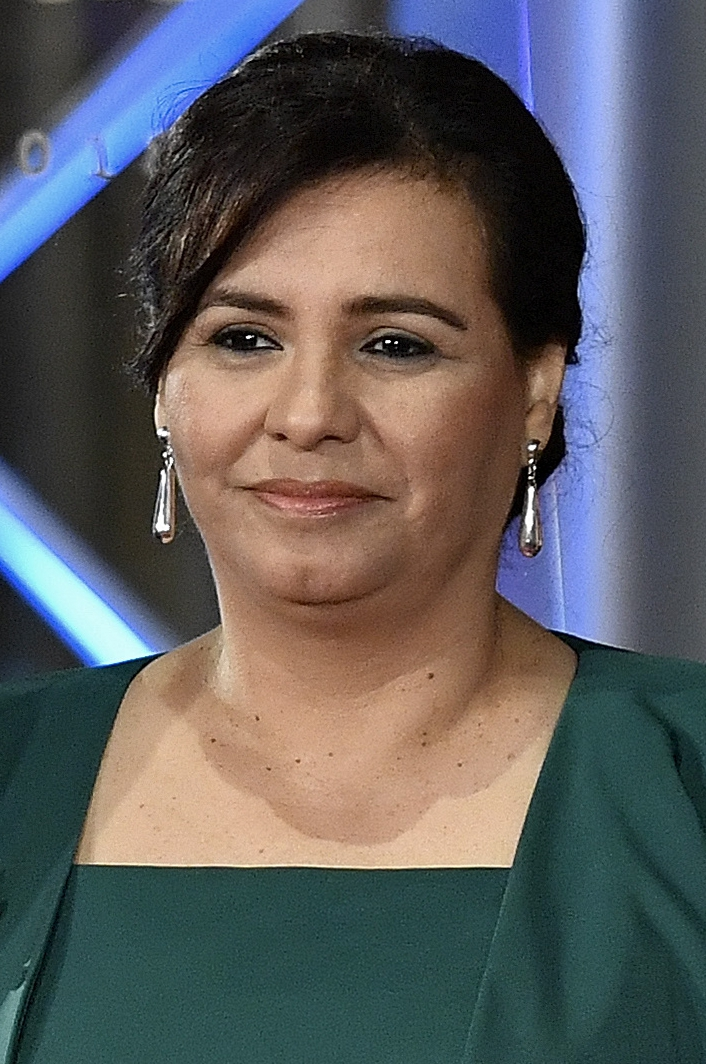
- Díaz Cabello at the Lima Convention Center during the reception of the 8th Summit of the Americas.

First Lady of Peru
- In role 23 March 2018 – 9 November 2020
- President: Martín Vizcarra
- Preceded by: Nancy Lange
- Succeeded by: Mary Peña

Second Lady of Peru
- In role 28 July 2016 – 23 March 2018
- Vice President: Martín Vizcarra
- Preceded by: Lidia Ramos Seminario
- Succeeded by: Maria Luisa Carrillo Alzamora

Personal details
- Born: Maribel Carmen Díaz Cabello; March 27, 1970 (age 56) Moquegua, Peru
- Spouse: Martín Vizcarra
- Children: 4

Maribel Carmen Díaz Cabello (Latin American Spanish: [maɾiˈβel ˈkaɾmen ˈdias kaˈβeʎo]; born March 27, 1970) is a Peruvian educator, teacher, and academic administrator. Díaz Cabello, the wife of President Martín Vizcarra, served as the First Lady of Peru from 23 March 2018 until her husband's impeachment and office removal on 9 November 2020.

== Life and career ==
She was born on March 27, 1970, in Moquegua, Peru. Her parents, Rafael Díaz Dueñas and Carmen Cabello Oviedo, were both teachers. Her uncle, Antonio Cabello Oviedo, had served as Mayor of Moquegua from 1987 until 1990. She is related to the late Peruvian writer, Mercedes Cabello de Carbonera, on the maternal side of her family.

Díaz initially studied medicine at the National University of Tucumán in Argentina, but left the school at the end of the academic year to pursue teaching instead. She returned to Peru, where she enrolled in elementary education at the Instituto pedagógico Mercedes Cabello. She later completed her master's degree in education from the Moquegua campus of Cesar Vallejo University.

She developed her career through a variety of in-classroom and administrative positions at state schools in Moquegua Region, including the director of the Sacred Heart of Jesus elementary school in Moquegua until 2017. She left her position as head of Sacred Heart of Jesus school in 2017 when her husband was appointed Ambassador to Canada.

She met Martín Vizcarra when she was still a student. The couple now have four children - three daughters and a son - Diana, Daniela, Diamela, and Martino. They also have one grandchild, Mateo, who was born in 2017. Vizcarra has publicly praised his wife's role in their personal and professional lives. On July 6, 2016, he posted "That teacher who is by my side and gives my strength to keep going. That teacher is my wife, Maribel" to social media on Teacher's Day.

Díaz Cabello largely kept a low profile during the 2016 presidential campaign, when presidential candidate Pedro Pablo Kuczynski chose Martín Vizcarra as his running mate for Vice President of Peru. In an interview with América Televisión, Díaz explained that although she would prefer to stay away from politics, she supported her husband and his political future, telling the network, "I never liked it very much, because politics is politics, right? But if he wanted it and he wanted to do it, I have to support him..."

== First Lady of Peru ==
On March 23, 2018, upon the resignation of Pedro Pablo Kuczynski and the appointment of her husband as President of Peru, she became the First Lady of Peru, succeeding Nancy Lange. She announced that she would again leave the classroom to assume her duties as the country's new First Lady, which includes protocol events and the supervision of an official office with an annual budget of approximately 600 thousand sols.

== Honours ==
=== Foreign honours ===
- Portugal: Grand Cross of the Order of Merit (25 February 2019)
- Spain: Dame Grand Cross of the Order of Isabella the Catholic (22 February 2019)
