= Philip J. Philbin =

American politician (1898–1972)

Philip Joseph Philbin
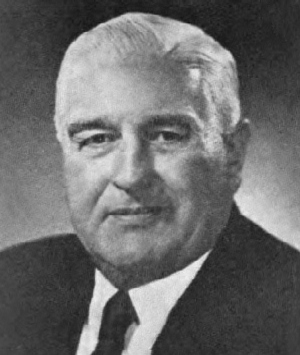

Member of the U.S. House of Representatives from Massachusetts's 3rd district
- In office January 3, 1943 – January 3, 1971
- Preceded by: Joseph E. Casey
- Succeeded by: Robert Drinan

Personal details
- Born: May 29, 1898 Clinton, Massachusetts
- Died: June 14, 1972 (aged 74) Bolton, Massachusetts
- Party: Democratic
- Education: Harvard University
- Profession: Lawyer

Military service
- Allegiance: United States
- Branch/service: United States Navy
- Years of service: 1917–1919
- Battles/wars: World War I

Philip Joseph Philbin (May 29, 1898 – June 14, 1972) was a Democratic U.S. Congressman from Massachusetts. He was born in Clinton, Massachusetts, where he attended the public and high schools. From 1917 until 1919, during the First World War, served as a seaman in the United States Navy. He then went on to Harvard University, was center on the Harvard Football Team that won the Rose Bowl game in 1919 against Oregon. He graduated in 1920 and from Columbia University Law School, New York City, in 1924.

He was admitted to the bar the same year and commenced practice in Boston and later in Clinton, Ma. He also engaged in the realty and fuel businesses and in agricultural pursuits. From 1921 through 1940, he served as the secretary, campaign manager, and personal representative at intervals for Senator David I. Walsh and from 1934 though 1936, served as special counsel for the United States Senate Committee on Education and Labor. He was a referee in the United States Department of Labor in 1936 and 1937, a member of the advisory board of the Massachusetts Unemployment Compensation Commission between 1937 and 1940, and in 1935 became chairman of the town of Clinton Finance Committee.

In 1942, as the Democratic nominee, Philbin was elected to the 78th United States Congress and to the thirteen succeeding Congresses (January 3, 1943 - January 3, 1971). In his reelection campaign of 1970, he was unsuccessful in his primary, losing to the anti-war candidate, Father Robert Drinan, SJ. At the very end of the 91st United States Congress, he served as chairman of the Committee on Armed Services, due to the death of L. Mendel Rivers on December 28, 1970. He died at home on Philcrest Farms, in Bolton, Massachusetts. He is buried in St. John’s Cemetery, Lancaster, Massachusetts.

U.S. House of Representatives
Preceded by Joseph E. Casey	Member of the U.S. House of Representatives from Massachusetts's 3rd congressional district January 3, 1943 - January 3, 1971	Succeeded by Robert Drinan
Political offices
Preceded by L. Mendel Rivers; South Carolina	Chairman of House Armed Services Committee; 1970–1971	Succeeded by F. Edward Hébert; Louisiana
