= Rosa María Ortiz =

Peruvian lawyer (1955–2020)

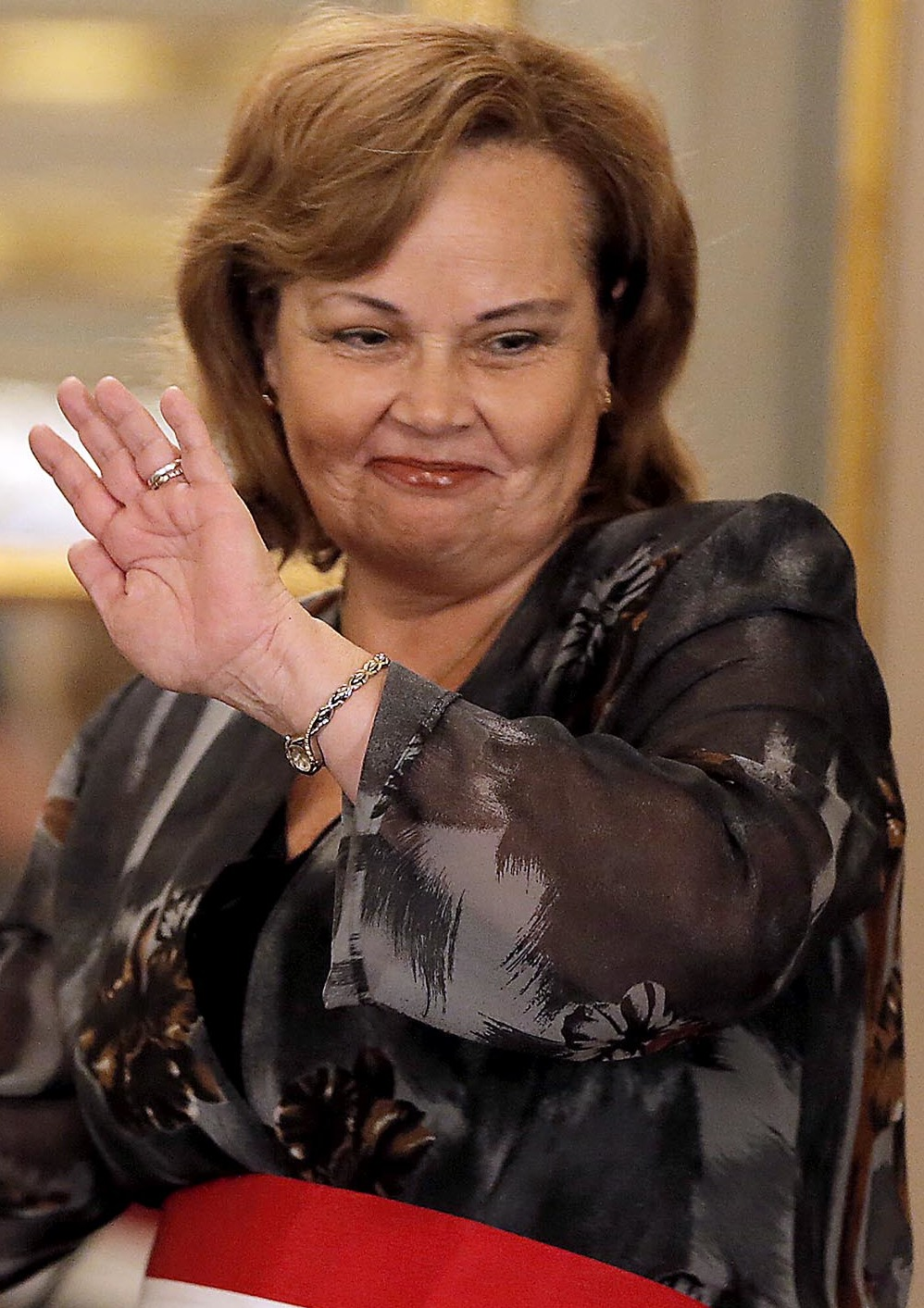

Rosa María Ortiz Ríos (9 September 1955 – 20 September 2020) was a Peruvian lawyer and politician who served as Minister of Energy and Mines under President Ollanta Humala in 2015/16.

== Life ==
She graduated from the Pontifical Catholic University of Peru (PUCP), an expert in areas of Administrative, Civil, Commercial, Fishing, Corporate, Maritime and Hydrocarbon Law, in national and multinational companies.

From 2012 to 2016 she was an elected Commissioner on the Inter-American Commission on Human Rights.
