= 1942 United States Senate election in Massachusetts =

- November 3, 1942
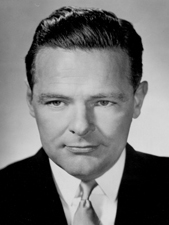

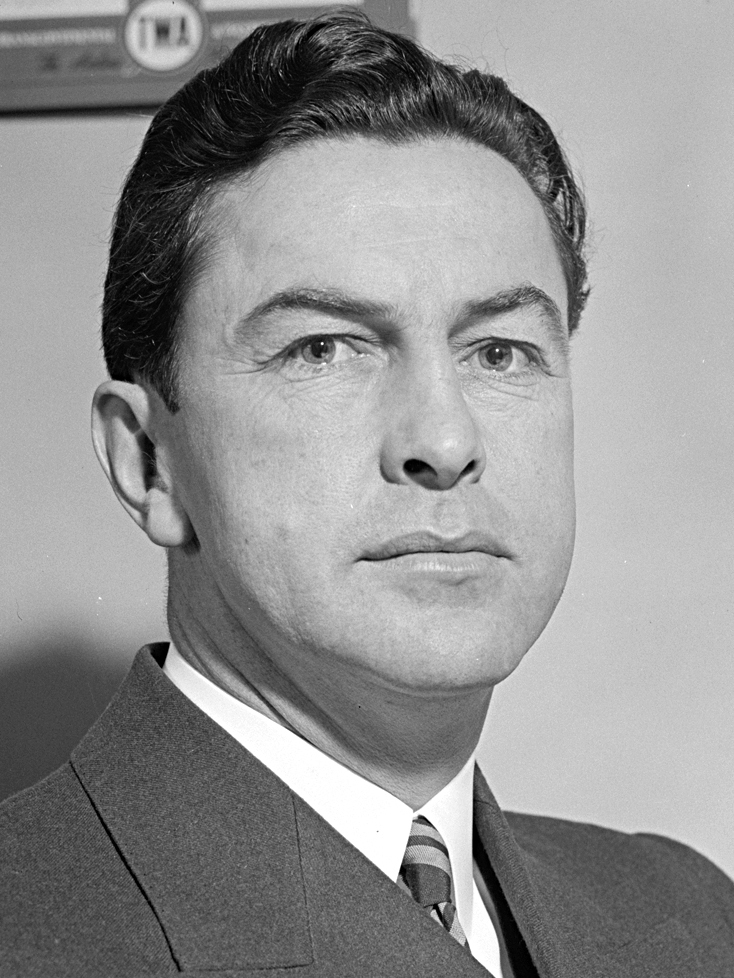
| Nominee | Henry Cabot Lodge Jr. | Joseph E. Casey |
| Party | Republican | Democratic |
| Popular vote | 721,239 | 641,042 |
| Percentage | 52.44% | 46.61% |
- Lodge: 40–50% 50–60% 60–70% 70–80% 80–90% >90% Casey: 40–50% 50–60% 60–70% 70–80%
Senator before election
Henry Cabot Lodge Jr.
Republican
Elected Senator
Henry Cabot Lodge Jr.
Republican

The United States Senate election of 1942 in Massachusetts was held on November 3, 1942. Republican incumbent Henry Cabot Lodge Jr. was re-elected to a second term in office over Democratic U.S. Representative Joseph E. Casey.

== Republican primary ==
=== Candidates ===
- Henry Cabot Lodge Jr., incumbent US Senator since 1937
- Courtenay Crocker, former Boston City Councilor (1909–1910) and State Representative (1910–1914)

=== Campaign ===
Crocker, who left the Republican Party in 1920 over the party's opposition to the League of Nations and Treaty of Versailles, returned and announced his candidacy for the United States Senate against Senator Lodge, whose grandfather led the 1920 charge against the League and Treaty. Massachusetts Secretary of State Frederic W. Cook ruled that Crocker was ineligible to run in the Republican primary because he did not register as a Republican at least 30 days before filing his nomination papers. However, Suffolk Superior Court Judge John V. Spalding ordered Cook to place Crocker on the ballot.

=== Results ===
Republican primary
| Party | Candidate | Votes | % |
|---|---|---|---|
| Republican | Henry Cabot Lodge Jr. (incumbent) | 174,401 | 88.12% |
| Republican | Courtenay Crocker | 23,503 | 11.88% |
| Write-in | | 8 | 0.00% |
| Total votes | | 197,912 | 100.00% |
| None | Blank votes | 24,652 | — |
| Turnout | | 222,564 | |

After losing the primary, Crocker supported Democratic nominee Joseph E. Casey in the general election.

== Democratic primary ==
=== Candidates ===
- Joseph E. Casey, U.S. Representative from Clinton
- Daniel H. Coakley, former member of the Massachusetts Executive Council
- John F. Fitzgerald, former U.S. Representative and Mayor of Boston
- Joseph Lee, former member of the Boston School Committee

=== Results ===
Democratic primary
| Party | Candidate | Votes | % |
|---|---|---|---|
| Democratic | Joseph E. Casey | 108,251 | 45.47% |
| Democratic | John F. Fitzgerald | 80,456 | 33.79% |
| Democratic | Joseph Lee | 32,260 | 13.55% |
| Democratic | Daniel H. Coakley | 17,105 | 7.18% |
| Write-in | | 18 | 0.00% |
| Total votes | | 238,090 | 100.00% |
| None | Blank | 31,528 | — |
| Turnout | | 269,618 | |

== General election ==
=== Candidates ===
- Joseph E. Casey, U.S. Representative from Canton (Democratic)
- Horace Hillis, candidate for Governor in 1936 and Senate in 1940 (Socialist Labor)
- Henry Cabot Lodge Jr., incumbent Senator since 1937 (Republican)
- George Lyman Paine, candidate for Senate in 1940 (Socialist)
- George Thompson, candidate for Governor in 1936 and Senate in 1940 (Prohibition)

=== Campaign ===
Casey attempted to make an issue of Lodge's pre-war isolationism, although he had voted for the Lend-Lease Act in 1941. Lodge countered that his isolationism had been rooted in concerns over the nation's lack of military preparedness.

Lodge, an Army reservist himself, was briefly unable to campaign after he enlisted and was sent to Libya for training. While there, he inadvertently took part in a major Allied defeat when Erwin Rommel launched a surprise attack on Lodge's training position in Tobruk. He returned to Massachusetts in July, when President Roosevelt required all members of Congress be relieved from active duty. When Casey attempted to portray his service as a mere "Cook's tour of the Libyan desert," Lodge angrily refuted him.

Late in the campaign, Lodge drew criticism from U.S. Representative John W. McCormack and Secretary of War Henry Stimson for citing a letter from Stimson commending his military service in his campaign. Lodge responded that the use of the letter was only made in response to Casey's and McCormack's earlier "slurs on men in the armed forces."

=== Results ===
General election
| Party | Candidate | Votes | % | ±% |
|---|---|---|---|---|
| Republican | Henry Cabot Lodge Jr. (incumbent) | 721,239 | 52.44 | ▲3.91 |
| Democratic | Joseph E. Casey | 641,042 | 46.61 | ▲5.62 |
| Socialist | George Lyman Paine | 4,802 | 0.35 | ▼0.19 |
| Socialist Labor | Horace I. Hillis | 4,781 | 0.35 | ▲0.35 |
| Prohibition | George L. Thompson | 3,577 | 0.26 | ▲0.26 |
| Total votes | | 1,375,441 | 100.00% | |

== See also ==
- United States Senate elections, 1942
