= Ministry of Energy and Mines (Peru) =

Government ministry of Peru

- Ministerio de Energía y Minas
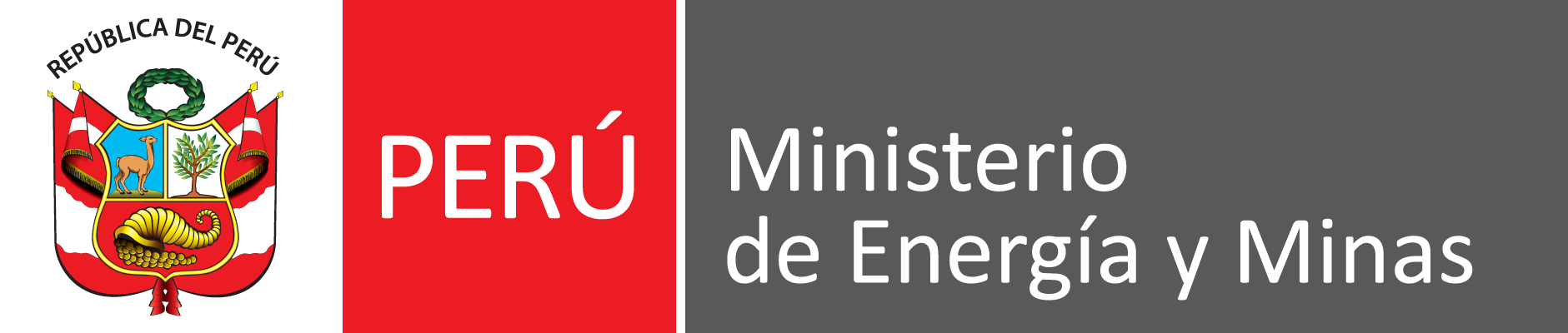

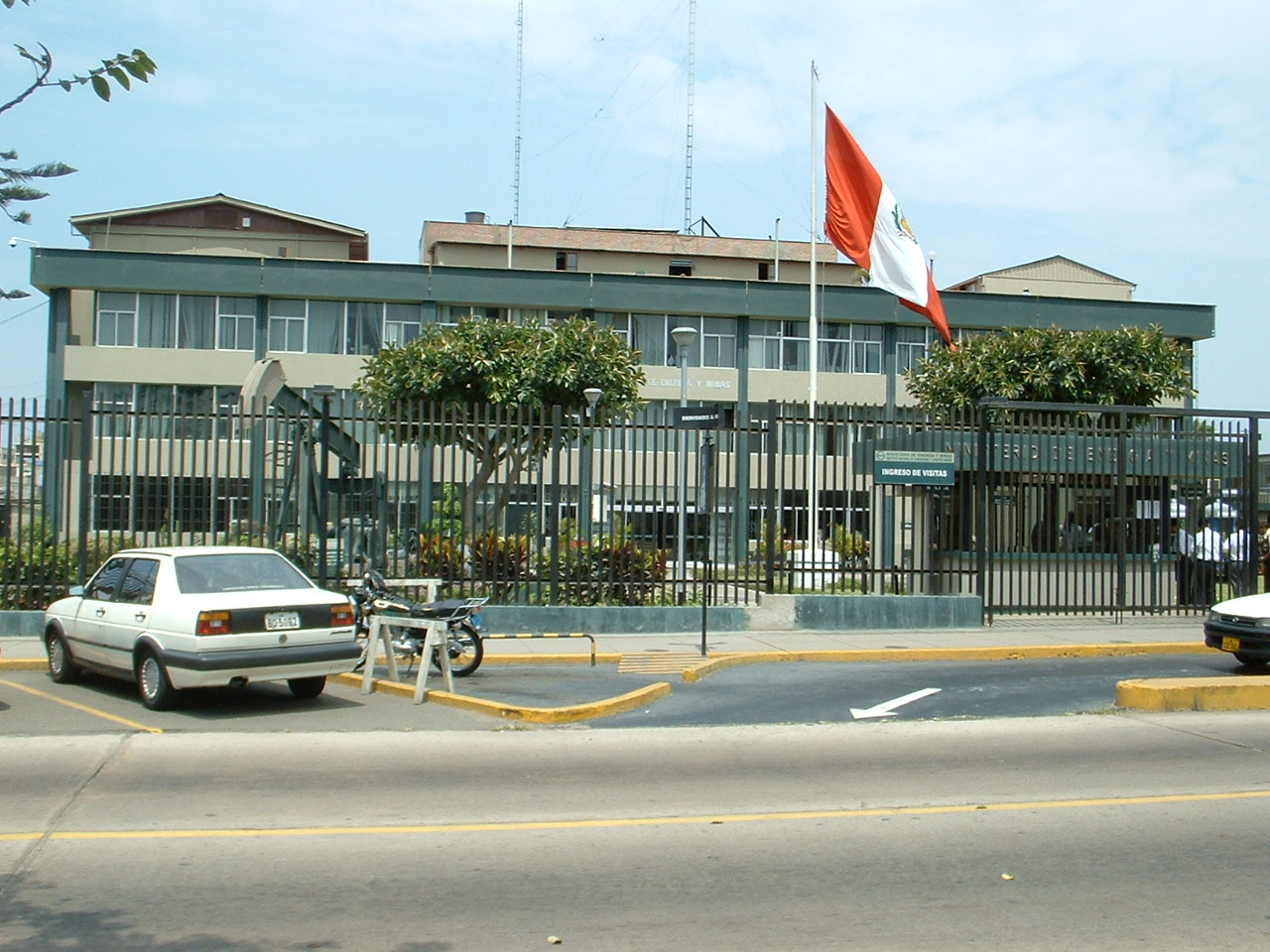

Agency overview
- Formed: 3 December 1968; 57 years ago
- Headquarters: 260 Avenida de las Artes Sur, San Borja, Lima
- Minister responsible: Jorge Montero Cornejo
- Website: Official website

The Ministry of Energy and Mines (Spanish: Ministerio de Energía y Minas, MINEM) is the government ministry responsible for the energetic and mining sectors of Peru. Additionally, it is charged with overseeing the equal distribution of energy throughout the country. Since November 30, 2024, the minister of energy is Jorge Montero Cornejo.

== History ==
The ministry was created in December 1968, through Law Decree 17271.

Article 3 of the Law Regulating Environmental Liabilities in Mining Activities (Law No. 28271), approved on July 2, 2004, establishes that the Ministry of Energy and Mines will be responsible for identifying, preparing, and updating the inventory of mining liabilities. The first inventory of mining environmental liabilities was approved by Ministerial Resolution No. 290-2006-MEM/DM of June 15, 2006, which listed 850 mining liabilities. The most recent update was approved through Ministerial Resolution No. 290-2006-MEM/DM on September 7, 2022.

== Organisation ==
- General Secretariat
- Vice Ministry of Energy
  - General Directorate of Electricity
  - General Directorate of Rural Electrification
  - General Directorate of Hydrocarbons
  - General Directorate of Energy Efficiency
  - General Directorate of Energy Environmental Affairs
- Vice Ministry of Hydrocarbons
- Vice Ministry of Mines
  - General Directorate of Mining
  - General Directorate of Mining Environmental Affairs

Entities administered by the ministry include:

- Geological, Mining, and Metallurgical Institute (INGEMMET)
- Peruvian Institute of Nuclear Energy (IPEN)
- Council for the Administration of Resources for Training in Electricity (CARELEC)
- Public companies:
  - Petróleos del Perú (PETROPERU)
  - Mining Assets (AMSAC)
  - Puno Regional Public Electricity Service Company (ELECTRO PUNO)
  - Ucayali Electricity Company S.A. (Electro Ucayali)
  - Electrical Infrastructure Management Company S.A. (ADINELSA)
  - Peruvian Electricity Company S.A. (ELECTROPERU)
  - Arequipa Electricity Generation Company S.A. (EGASA)
  - Southern Electricity Generation Company S.A. (EGESUR)
  - Machupicchu Electricity Generation Company S.A. (EGEMSA)
  - San Gabán Electricity Generation Company S.A. (EGESG)
  - Distriluz (private-public holding company)
    - Public Electricity Service Company of Northwest Peru S.A. (ENOSA)
    - Regional Public Electricity Service Company Electronorte Medio S.A. (HIDRANDINA)
    - Regional Public Electricity Service Company of the Center S.A. (ELECTROCENTRO)
    - Regional Public Electricity Service Company of the North S.A. (ENSA)
  - Regional Public Electricity Service Company of the East S.A. (Electro Oriente)
  - Electro Sur Este (ELSE)
  - Regional Public Electricity Service Company of the South S.A. (Electrosur)
  - Southwest Electricity Company S.A. (SEAL)
  - Perúpetro S.A.
- Private companies:
  - Pluz Energía Perú
  - Luz del Sur

== List of ministers ==
Name	Party	Period	
Name	Party	Term start	Term end
Jorge Fernández Maldonado Solari	PSR	April 1, 1969	August 30, 1975
Luis La Vera Velarde		August 30, 1975	January 31, 1976
Arturo La Torre Di Tolla		January 31, 1976	December 29, 1977
Juan Sánchez Gonzales		December 29, 1977	January 31, 1980
René Balarezo Vallebuona		January 31, 1980	July 27, 1980
Pedro Pablo Kuczynski		July 28, 1980	August 3, 1982
Fernando Montero Aramburú		August 3, 1982	December 29, 1983
José Benavides Muñoz	Acción Popular	December 29, 1983	March 19, 1984
Juan Incháustegui	Acción Popular	March 19, 1984	July 28, 1985
Wilfredo Huaita	APRA	July 28, 1985	June 27, 1987
Abel Salinas	APRA	June 27, 1987	September 5, 1988
José Carlos Carrasco	APRA	September 5, 1988	May 15, 1989
Mario Samamé Boggio	Unión del Pueblo Peruano	May 15, 1989	July 28, 1990
Fernando Sánchez Albavera		July 28, 1990	February 19, 1992
Jaime Yoshiyama	Cambio 90	February 19, 1992	September 9, 1992
Daniel Hokama		November 11, 1992	July 28, 1995
Amado Yataco Medina		July 28, 1995	April 3, 1996
Daniel Hokama		April 3, 1996	September 20, 1996
Alberto Pandolfi	Cambio 90	September 20, 1996	December 31, 1997
Daniel Hokama		August 22, 1998	October 13, 1999
Jorge Chamot Sarmiento		October 13, 1999	November 25, 2000
Carlos Herrera Descalzi	Solidaridad Nacional	November 25, 2000	July 28, 2001
Jaime Quijandría Salmón	Perú Posible	July 28, 2001	July 25, 2003
Hans Flury		July 25, 2003	August 16, 2004
Jaime Quijandría Salmón	Perú Posible	August 16, 2004	October 30, 2004
Glodomiro Sánchez Mejía	Perú Posible	October 30, 2004	July 28, 2006
Juan Valdivia Romero	APRA	July 28, 2006	October 14, 2008
Pedro Sánchez Gamarra		October 14, 2008	July 28, 2011
Carlos Herrera Descalzi		July 28, 2011	December 10, 2011
Jorge Merino		December 11, 2011	February 24, 2014
Eleodoro Mayorga		February 24, 2014	February 17, 2015
Rosa María Ortiz		February 17, 2015	July 28, 2016
Gonzalo Tamayo		July 28, 2016	July 27, 2017
Cayetana Aljovín		July 27, 2017	January 9, 2018
Ángela Grossheim		January 9, 2018; March 23, 2018	March 23, 2018; April 2, 2018
Francisco Ísmodes		April 2, 2018	September 30, 2019
Juan Carlos Liu Yonsen		October 3, 2019	February 10, 2020
Susana Vilca		February 13, 2020	July 15, 2020
Rafael Belaúnde Llosa		July 15, 2020	August 6, 2020
Luis Miguel Incháustegui		August 6, 2020	November 10, 2020
Carlos Herrera Descalzi	Acción Popular	November 12, 2020	November 17, 2020
Jaime Gálvez	Partido Morado	November 19, 2020	July 28, 2021
Iván Merino		July 29, 2021	October 6, 2021
Eduardo González Toro		October 6, 2021	February 1, 2022
Alessandra Herrera		February 1, 2022	February 8, 2022
Carlos Palacios Pérez	Perú Libre	February 8, 2022	May 22, 2022
Alessandra Herrera		May 22, 2022	November 25, 2022
Oliverio Muñoz Cabrera		November 25, 2022	December 7, 2022
Óscar Vera Gargurevich		December 10, 2022	February 13, 2024
Rómulo Mucho Mamani		February 13, 2024	November 27, 2024
Jorge Montero Cornejo		November 30, 2024	Incumbent

== See also ==
- Mineral industry of Peru
