= Clorinda Málaga de Prado =

First Lady of Peru (1905–1993)

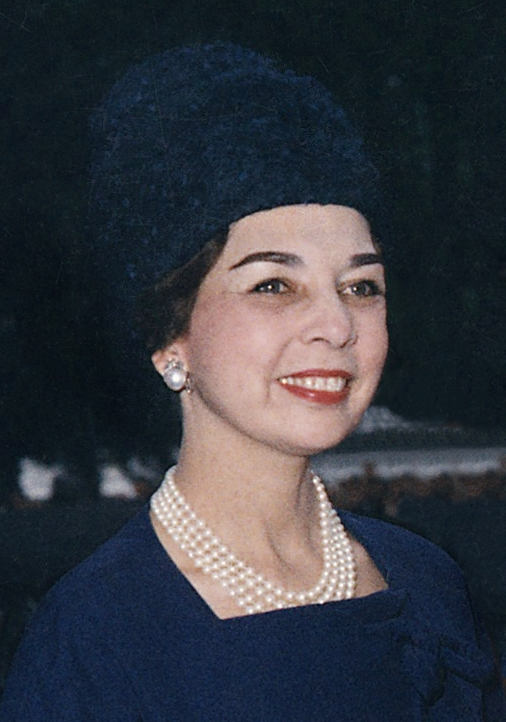
- Clorinda Málaga de Prado
- Born: Clorinda Mercedes Málaga Bravo; July 3, 1905; Lima, Peru
- Died: September 17, 1993 (aged 88); Lima, Peru
- Known for: First Lady of Peru, 1958 to 1962
- Spouse: Manuel Prado Ugarteche

Clorinda Málaga de Prado (born Clorinda Mercedes Málaga Bravo; July 3, 1905 – September 17, 1993) was the First Lady of Peru from 1958 to 1962, during her marriage to the President of Peru, Manuel Prado Ugarteche.

== Early life ==
Málaga was born Clorinda Mercedes Málaga Bravo in Lima, the daughter of Fermín Málaga Santolalla and Clorinda Bravo Bresani. Her father was a mining executive and state official. She was educated at the Colegio del Sagrado Corazón Sophianum in Lima, with further studies in England and France.

== First Lady of Peru ==
Málaga began a relationship with Manuel Prado Ugarteche in the 1930s. They married in 1958, after he arranged for Pope Pius XII to grant a controversial annulment for his first marriage of over forty years. She served as First Lady for four years, accompanying Prado on state visits abroad, including a 1960 visit to France, and 1961 visit to the White House during the presidency of John F. Kennedy. She was considered a stylish and photogenic companion to the president. When Prado's government was overthrown by a military coup, she went into exile with him in Paris.

== Later years ==
Málaga de Prado was widowed when her husband died in Paris in 1967. A barriada (squatter settlement) in Lima was named for her in the 1960s. She died in Lima in 1993, aged 88 years.
