= Alex Kuczynski =

Peruvian American journalist

- Born: Alexandra Louise Kuczynski; December 6, 1970 (age 55); Lima, Peru
- Education: Barnard College (BA)
- Occupations: Journalist, writer
- Father: Pedro Pablo Kuczynski
- Relatives: John Casey (uncle); Joseph E. Casey (grandfather); Maxime Hans Kuczyński (grandfather)

Alexandra Louise Kuczynski (born December 6, 1970) is a Peruvian American reporter, who has written for the New York Times and the New York Times Magazine, and is the author of the award-winning 2006 book Beauty Junkies about the cosmetic surgery industry. The book was translated into ten languages.

== Biography ==
Her father, Pedro Pablo Kuczynski of Lima, is an economist and politician, who was the 59th President of Peru. Her mother is Jane Dudley Casey, daughter of Joseph E. Casey, member of the U.S. House for Massachusetts's 3rd congressional district. Kuczynski's paternal grandfather was physician specializing in tropical diseases Maxime Hans Kuczyński, a Jewish emigrant from Germany, who founded the first leper colony in South America. Her maternal uncle is novelist and translator John Casey and her paternal first cousin once removed is French film director and screenwriter Jean-Luc Godard.

After graduating from Barnard College in 1990, she became a journalist with the New York Observer and then the New York Times. On September 10, 2001, she was transferred by Howell Raines from media reporter to the style section, where Kuczynski would write "the sort of pop-feature pieces that would appeal to the Times national audience." She has been described as "a giddy blast. She always would have 10 ideas at story meetings and eight of them would be terrible and two would be brilliant." Under her byline, the word "horny" first appeared in the Times, in reference to a story about female Viagra; she later said, "I wear that as a badge of honor."

Kuczynski married investor Charles Porter Stevenson Jr. in 2002, with whom she has two children. He initiated divorce proceedings against her in 2019. She is estimated to have a net worth of $75 million.

In 2006, she authored a book about the growth of the cosmetic surgery business: Beauty Junkies: Inside Our $15 Billion Obsession with Plastic Surgery (ISBN 978-0-385-50853-7). Reviewers have noted that readers of the book "may take a pass after reading this exposé about extreme makeovers." Kuczynski concluded, "Looks are the new feminism, an activism of aesthetics. As vulgar and shallow as it sounds, looks matter more than they ever have—especially for women. When Eleanor Roosevelt was asked if she had any regrets in life, she said that she had one: she wished she had been prettier."
