= Eliane Karp =

First Lady of Peru from 2001 to 2006 (born 1953)

- אליאן קארפ
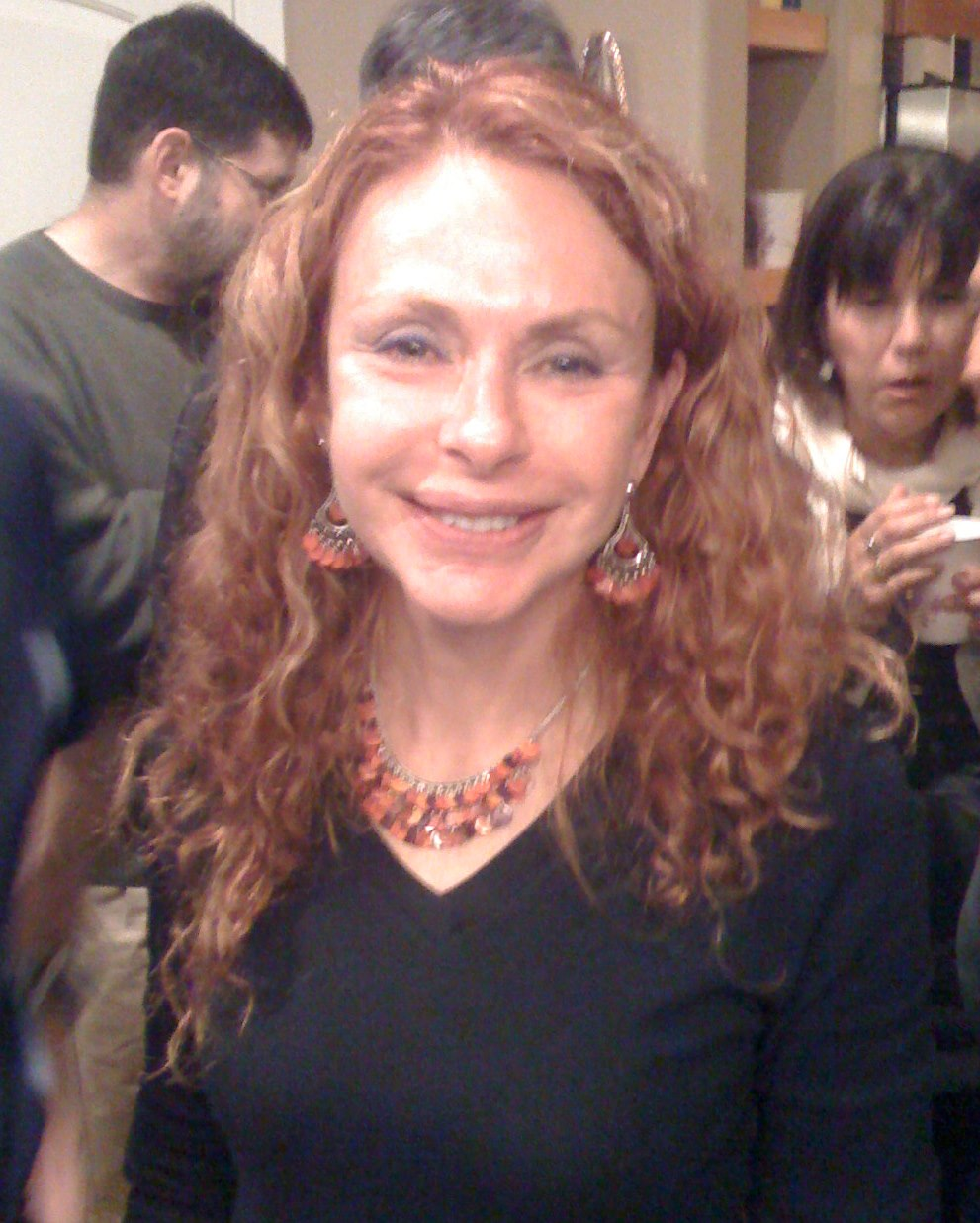
- Karp in 2009

First Lady of Peru
- In role 28 July 2001 – 28 July 2006
- Preceded by: Nilda Jara de Paniagua
- Succeeded by: Pilar Nores de García

Personal details
- Born: Eliane Chantal Karp; 24 September 1953 (age 73) Paris, France
- Citizenship: French; Belgian; American; Peruvian; Israeli
- Spouse: Alejandro Toledo (m. 1972)
- Children: 1
- Education: Stanford University (PhD); Hebrew University of Jerusalem (BA)
- Profession: Anthropologist

Eliane Chantal Karp Toledo (née Karp; Hebrew: אליאן קארפ; born 24 September 1953) is a Peruvian anthropologist. She was the First Lady of Peru from 2001 to 2006, as the wife of the erstwhile Peruvian president Alejandro Toledo. She specializes in the study of Andean indigenous cultures.

== Early life and education ==
Karp was born in Paris, France, to a family of Ashkenazi Jews (maternally Belgian-Jewish and paternally Polish-Jewish). During World War II, her father Charles Karp was persecuted by the Gestapo and later joined the French Resistance.

She completed her baccalaureate at the Lycée Français in Brussels, Belgium, and later earned a BA in anthropology in Israel, studying at the Hebrew University of Jerusalem with a specialization in Latin American studies. She also holds a Master of Arts in anthropology from Stanford University. Karp also completed a PhD in anthropology at Stanford University in the United States.

Karp has taken courses on indigenous communities at the National Autonomous University of Mexico, and has done graduate work on anthropology and economic development at the Pontifical Catholic University of Peru.

=== Marriage and children ===
At Stanford, she met Alejandro Toledo, whom she married in 1972. Karp first came to Peru in the late 1970s to study its indigenous communities. In 1992 Karp and Toledo divorced and she returned to Israel with their daughter. The couple remarried and returned to Peru before her husband's 1995 campaign.

== Career ==
=== Political career ===
In 1980, she began working for international organizations such as OAS, UNICEF and UNDP where she conducted impact measurement studies for development projects on indigenous populations.

In 1982 she served at the Agency for International Development (USAID) based in Lima, where she was a consultant until 1987.

Since November 1987 she started working at the World Bank in Washington D.C. as a project officer for Latin America and Africa until 1992.

Karp also served as an officer for Middle East in European Investment Bank. Karp returned to Israel, and worked at Bank Leumi, where she was in charge of developing relationships with foreign banks.

=== Academic career ===
Karp recently served as an adjunct professor at the Elliott School of International Affairs at the George Washington University. She is also a former Visiting Professor and Visiting Scholar at Stanford University department of Anthropology.

Karp was a distinguished fellow in residence at Center for Advanced Study in the Behavioral Sciences at Stanford University and has also been a visiting professor at Salamanca University - Instituto de Iberoamérica.

== Tenure as First Lady of Peru ==
During her husband's 2001 presidential bid, Karp contributed to a campaign which drew deeply on Toledo's indigenous heritage. She donned traditional Andean costume, rallied voters in Quechua, and demonstrated the couple's commitment to indigenous issues. According to The New York Times, "her flaming red hair and fiery speeches made her a popular and controversial fixture at campaign rallies."

In 2001, Karp became the first lady of the Republic of Peru when Toledo was elected president, a position she held until 2006. While in office, Karp became the honorary president of the Fund for the Development of Indigenous Communities of Latin America and the Caribbean.

=== CONAPA ===
Shortly after Toledo's inauguration, his administration created the National Commission on Andean, Amazon and Afro-Peruvian Communities (CONAPA) of Peru, of which Karp served as president. The agency was meant to establish a development agenda for indigenous communities, provide representation of indigenous interests within the government, and lead the way to constitutional reforms that benefit indigenous peoples.

Others lamented the commission's ineffectiveness. Noting its lack of funding and of implementing powers, Diana Vindling called it "no more than a space for dialogue." On the other hand, Oxfam's Martin Scurrah points out that the agency did good work. Noting that in addition to promoting a chapter on indigenous rights in the new constitution, Eliane Karp "intervened on numerous occasions in support of or in defense of indigenous initiatives."

Some critics viewed the very creation of the commission as a step backwards for indigenous Peruvians, noting its leadership by a person with no official government position rather than a ministry head. The commission also absorbed the former SETAI (office of indigenous affairs), which reportedly led to a loss of autonomy and dynamism for that agency. Others complained that Karp's leadership of the commission represented a conflict of interest, given her involvement in her own private NGO, Fundación Pacha.

In 2003, partly in response to these criticisms, Karp resigned from CONAPA, which was subsequently restructured as a national institute rather than a commission.

=== Machu Picchu Artifacts ===
Throughout Toledo's presidency, Karp participated in negotiations with Yale University for the return to Peru of over 350 indigenous artifacts. The museum pieces were excavated from Machu Picchu around 1915 and sent to Yale on a twelve-month loan. On this matter, Peru had the support of the National Geographic Society and Senator Christopher Dodd of Connecticut. Negotiations stalled when the university refused to acknowledge Peru as the sole owner of the artifacts, but resumed under the García presidency.

In a New York Times op-ed, Karp accused Yale of waiting out "Peru’s first elected indigenous president, until Peru had a new leader who is frankly hostile to indigenous matters." She also criticized the agreement between Peru and Yale that was finally arrived at in 2008. Under the terms of this agreement, Peru would have to build a museum and research center near Machu Picchu to Yale's specifications before it could receive a portion of the articles for display and study. Most of the artifacts would remain with Yale.

=== Pacha Foundation for a Change ===
In 2001, Karp started Fundación Pacha, a non-profit organization that oversees development projects for indigenous Peruvians. The foundation "places special emphasis on the design of sustainable development projects based on traditional and communal organizations and the development of productive skills to promote the comparative economic advantages of the Peruvian biodiversity and its rich potential for ecotourism."

Karp remained the head of the organization until 2006. Pacha's micro projects have included giving Amazonian peoples vaccinations against yellow fever, hepatitis B and malaria, building basic community institutions, and providing equipment for basic medical care centers in rural areas with indigenous populations.

In 2002 Karp reached out to billionaire philanthropist Bill Gates in order to fund a vaccination program for the Candoshi tribes people. Gates was unwilling to help, and instead began humanitarian aid efforts in Africa and China. Since then Karp has criticized Gates for his unwillingness to help and acknowledges she felt it unfair to ignore Peru when conditions in rural Peru are just as dire as in other impoverished areas.

== Current activities ==
=== Indigenous and women's rights ===
Karp has shown support in favor of a push for more women in the Peruvian congress, and she acknowledges quotas as a means of achieving this.

In March 2012 Karp returned to Peru to pursue a teaching position at the Pontifical Catholic University of Peru, and in the fall she returned to teach anthropology in the Andean studies postgraduate program. She has also announced she will undertake a book which examines the role of indigenous populations as they integrate into the democratic political process.

In May 2012 Karp participated in a human rights conference organized by the Program on Human Rights and the Center for Latin American Studies of Stanford University, in which she called for a debate about the rights of indigenous peoples in Peru. Karp expressed "We propose that social inclusion and equal citizenship are key factors for good governance... The indigenous worldview has to be respected and integrated in public policies."

In October 2012 Karp recounted her meeting with Aung San Suu Kyi, saying that it was inspiring and that she was impressed that Suu Kyi was able to stay so calm while being imprisoned for 15 years. Karp likened the situation to when she met the Dalai Lama, who is living in exile, and urged support for a petition going through the United Nations to help combat human rights violations.

=== Self-exile in Israel ===
On 12 May 2023, after her husband was extradited to Peru from the United States, Karp fled to Israel from the U.S. using her Israeli passport to avoid arrest on money laundering charges from the Peruvian justice. Peru does not have an extradition treaty with Israel.

On 18 May 2023, Peru's Prosecution Office opened an extradition request to Israel, with a deputy assistant to the prosecution saying that even though Israel and Peru do not have an extradition agreement, Karp's extradition "is not impossible", and that new paths for the proceeding to take place will be considered.

== Published works ==
- Karp de Toledo, Eliane. Los pueblos indígenas en la agenda democrática: Estudios de caso de Bolivia, Ecuador, México y Perú. Corporación Andina de Fomento, 2006.
- Karp de Toledo, Eliane: Allin Kausaynapaq, Interculturalidad y participación: Para vivir mejor con nosotros mismos. Office of the First Lady of the Nation. Lima, 22 May 2006.
- Karp de Toledo, Eliane: La Diversidad Cultural y los ciudadanos del Sol y La Luna – Propuestas para la inclusión social y el desarrollo con identidad de los pueblos originarios del Perú. Office of the First Lady of the Nation. Lima, 30 November 2004.
- Karp de Toledo, Eliane; Lema Tucker, Linda (eds.): El Tema Indígena en Debate. Aportes para la Reforma Constitucional. Presented in the Congress of the Republic of Peru. Office of the First Lady of the Nation. Lima, April 2003.
- Karp de Toledo, Eliane: Hacia una nueva Nación, Kay Pachamanta. Office of the First Lady of the Nation. Lima, July 2002. Second Edition, October 2002. Third Edition, June 2003.
