= Spartina (novel) =

1989 novel by John Casey

- Author: John Casey
- Language: English
- Publisher: Knopf
- Publication date: 1989
- ISBN: 0-394-50098-9 (first edition)
- Dewey Decimal: 813.54
- LC Class: PS3553.A79334 S64

Spartina is a 1989 novel by American novelist John Casey. The novel won the National Book Award for 1989.
