= Maud Casey =

American novelist

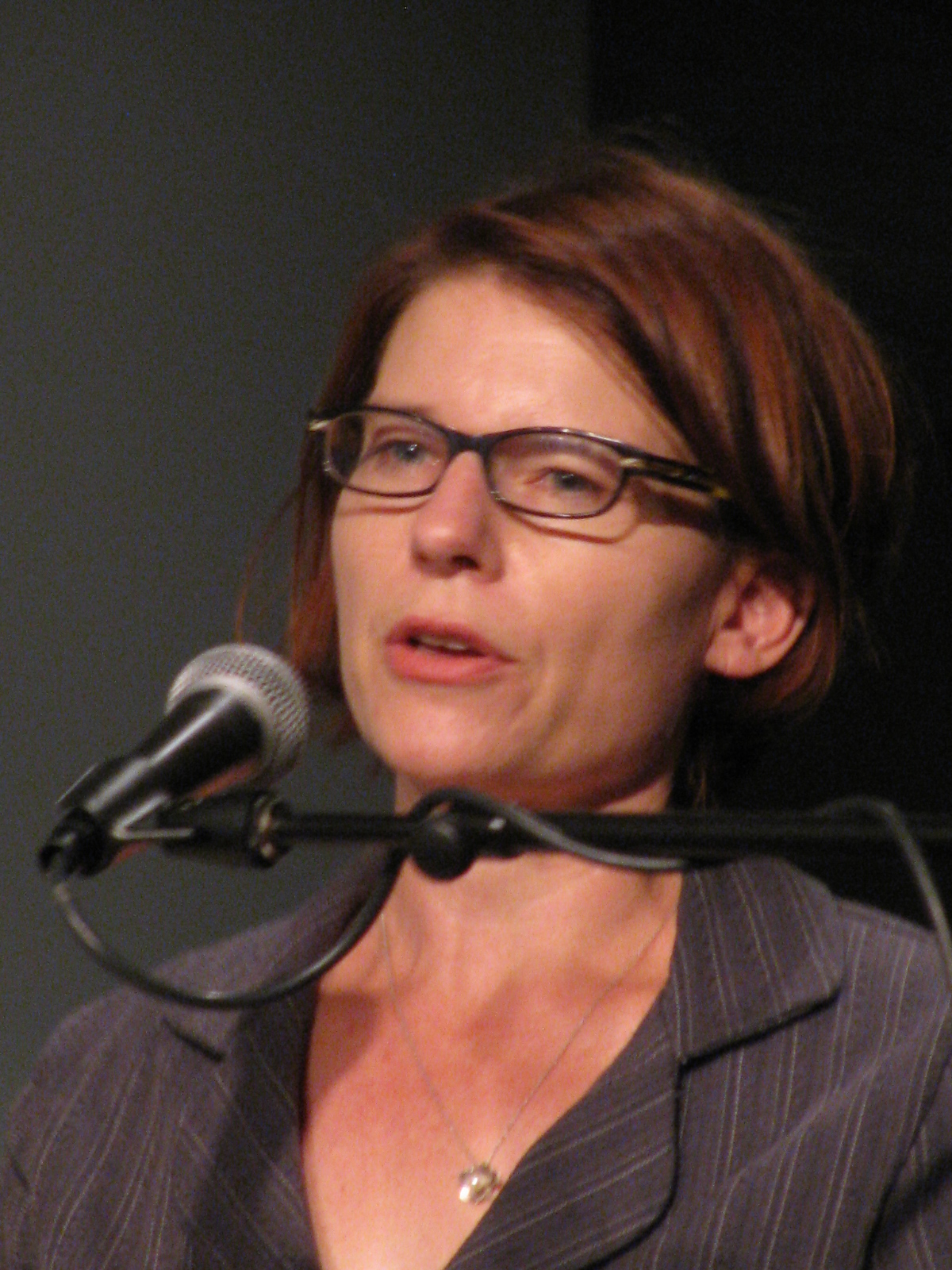
- Education: University of Arizona (MFA)
- Parent(s): John Casey; Jane Barnes
- Writing career
- Genre: novel
- Notable awards: Guggenheim Fellowship

Maud Casey is an American novelist, and professor of creative writing at University of Maryland, College Park.

== Life ==
She is the daughter of late novelist John Casey. She graduated from University of Arizona with an M.F.A.

She won a Guggenheim Fellowship.

== Award and honors ==
- 2015 St. Francis College Literary Prize, The Man Who Walked Away

== Bibliography ==
- The Shape of Things to Come (2001, HarperCollins, ISBN 9780688176952)
- Genealogy: A Novel (2006, HarperCollins, ISBN 978-0-06-074089-4)
- Drastic (2008, HarperCollins, ISBN 978-0-06-187361-4)
- The Man Who Walked Away: A Novel (2014, Bloomsbury Publishing, ISBN 978-1-62040-312-9)
