= Vilcha =

Vilcha, also spelled Vil'cha (Ukrainian and Belarusian: Вільча, Russian: Вильча), may refer to several places:

== Ukraine ==
- Vilcha, Kharkiv Oblast, an urban-type settlement in Chuhuiv Raion
- Vilcha, Kyiv Oblast, an urban-type settlement in Poliske Raion

== Belarus ==
- Vilcha, Brest Region, a village in Luninets Raion
- Vilcha, Gomel Region, a village in Žytkavičy Raion
- Vilcha, Mogilev Region, a village in Hlusk Raion

== See also ==
- Vilca (disambiguation)
