= Maxime Hans Kuczyński =

German physician (1890–1967)

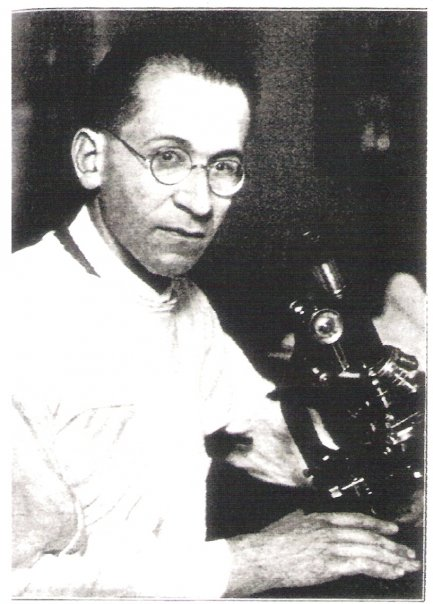
- Max Hans Kuczynski
- Born: 2 February 1890; Berlin, German Empire
- Died: 26 November 1967 (aged 77); Lima, Peru
- Education: University of Rostock
- Occupation: Physician
- Children: 2, including Pedro
- Relatives: Alex Kuczynski (granddaughter)
- Military career
- Allegiance: German Empire
- Branch: German Army
- Conflicts: Balkans Campaign

Max "Maxime" Hans Kuczyński (2 February 1890 – 26 November 1967) was a German physician of Polish-Jewish origin. He was the father of the former President of Peru, Pedro Pablo Kuczynski.

== Biography ==
Maxime Kuczyński was born in Berlin, as the son of Emma (née Schlesinger) and Louis Kuczyński, both of Jewish Polish origin. He studied medicine and natural science at the University of Rostock. In 1913 he received his degree in philosophy, and in 1919 a degree in medicine.

During World War I, he served in the German army and participated in the Balkans Campaign. In 1924, he was appointed as a professor. After the Nazis came to power he fled to Peru and joined the Institute of Social Medicine of the National University of San Marcos. Between 1924 and 1926 he conducted anthropological research in Central Asia, and later, between 1938 and 1948, in the Andes, and performed and published on self-experimentation in medicine in 1937. In 1936 he was one of the founders of the leprosarium in San Pablo where Che Guevara would later volunteer.

Kuczyński died in Lima.

His son, Pedro Pablo Kuczynski, born in Lima in 1938, was Prime Minister of Peru between 2005 and 2006. A decade later, he became President after winning the second round in June 2016. His American granddaughter, Alex Kuczynski, is a journalist and writer.
