= Susana Vilca =

Peruvian politician

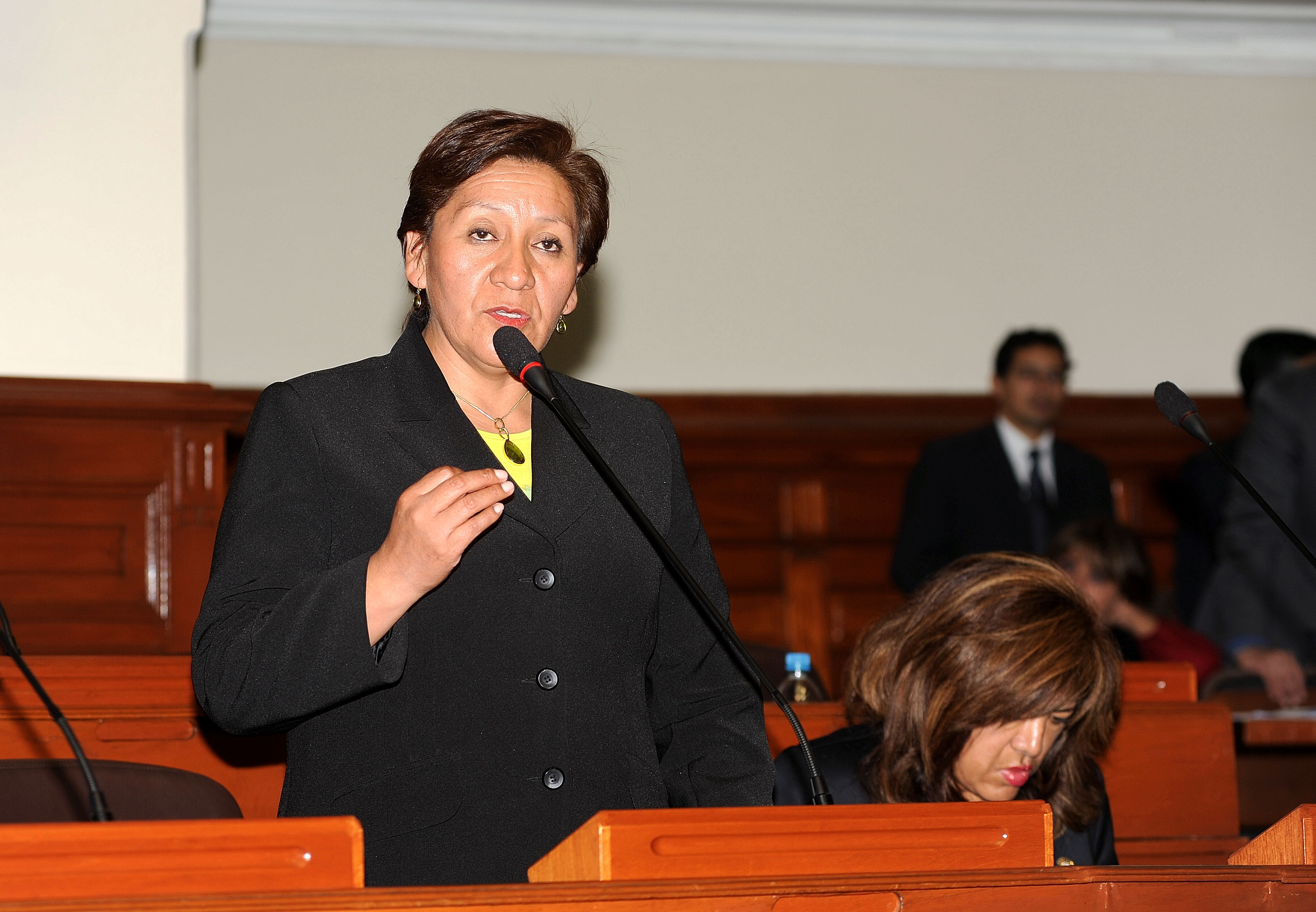

Minister of Energy and Mines
- In office February 13, 2020 – July 15, 2020
- President: Martín Vizcarra
- Prime Minister: Vicente Zeballos
- Preceded by: Juan Carlos Liu
- Succeeded by: Rafael Belaúnde Llosa

Deputy Minister of Mines
- In office August 2, 2011 – January 20, 2012
- President: Ollanta Humala
- Prime Minister: Salomón Lerner; Óscar Valdés
- Minister: Carlos Herrera; Jorge Merino
- Preceded by: Fernando Gala Soldevilla
- Succeeded by: Gustavo Adolfo Luyo Velit

Member of Congress
- In office July 26, 2006 – July 25, 2011
- Constituency: Puno

Personal details
- Born: August 11, 1959 (age 67) Lima, Peru
- Party: Independent (2017-present)
- Other political affiliations: Peruvian Nationalist Party (2009–2017); Popular Action (2004–2006)
- Education: National University of the Altiplano of Puno (BS)
- Occupation: Politician
- Profession: Mining engineer

Susana Gladis Vilca Achata (born August 11, 1959) is a Peruvian politician and was a Congresswoman representing Puno for the 2006–2011 term. Vilca belonged to the Union for Peru party.

Susana Gladis Vilca Achata is a mining engineer with a master's degree in Environmental Protection Technologies. She also has studies completed in the master's degree in Mining Management developed at Gerens Escuela de Postgrado.

She was elected Congresswoman of the Republic for the period 2006–2011, she also held the position of Vice Minister of Mines of the Ministry of Energy and Mines between 2011 and 2012, and was president of the board of directors of the Geological, Mining and Metallurgical Institute (Ingemmet) between 2012 and 2016.

She was also appointed Doctor Honoris Causa by the Universidad Nacional del Altiplano and has served as vice-president of the Asociación de Servicios de Geología y Minería Iberoamericanos – ASGMI.

== Family ==
She is the daughter of Don José Vilca and Doña Clotilde Achata. She is the eldest of six children. She did her primary studies at School No. 1124 in the District of Cabanillas and her secondary studies at the Adventist School of Chullunquiani in the city of Juliaca.

Later, she entered the Faculty of Mining Engineering at the National University of the Altiplano in Puno. She graduates as a Mining Engineer with the thesis "Technical Economic Study for the Exploitation of Alluvial Gold", research developed in the Norma Mine in the province of Sandía in Puno.

== Career ==
- Vice President of the Association of Ibero-American Geological and Mining Services (ASGMI) (2016)
- President of the Geological, Mining and Metallurgical Institute-INGEMMET (January 2012 – Set 2016)
- Vice Minister of Mines of the Peruvian Government (August 2011 – January 2012)
- Coordinator of the Transfer Process of the Ministry of Transport and Communications (June 2011 – July 2011)
- Member of the Permanent Commission of the Congress of the Republic (August 2010 – July 2011)
- Vice President of the Energy and Mines Commission of the Peruvian Congress (August 2010 – July 2011)
- Coordinator of the Puno Parliamentary Group (August 2009 – July 2010)
- Member of the Permanent Commission of the Congress of the Republic (August 2009 – July 2010)
- President of the Transport and Communications Commission of the Peruvian Congress (August 2007 – July 2008)
- Vice President of the Energy and Mines Commission of the Peruvian Congress (August 2006 – July 2007)
- Regional Coordinator in Puno of the Peruvian Nationalist Party.
