= Nadine Heredia =

Peruvian politician

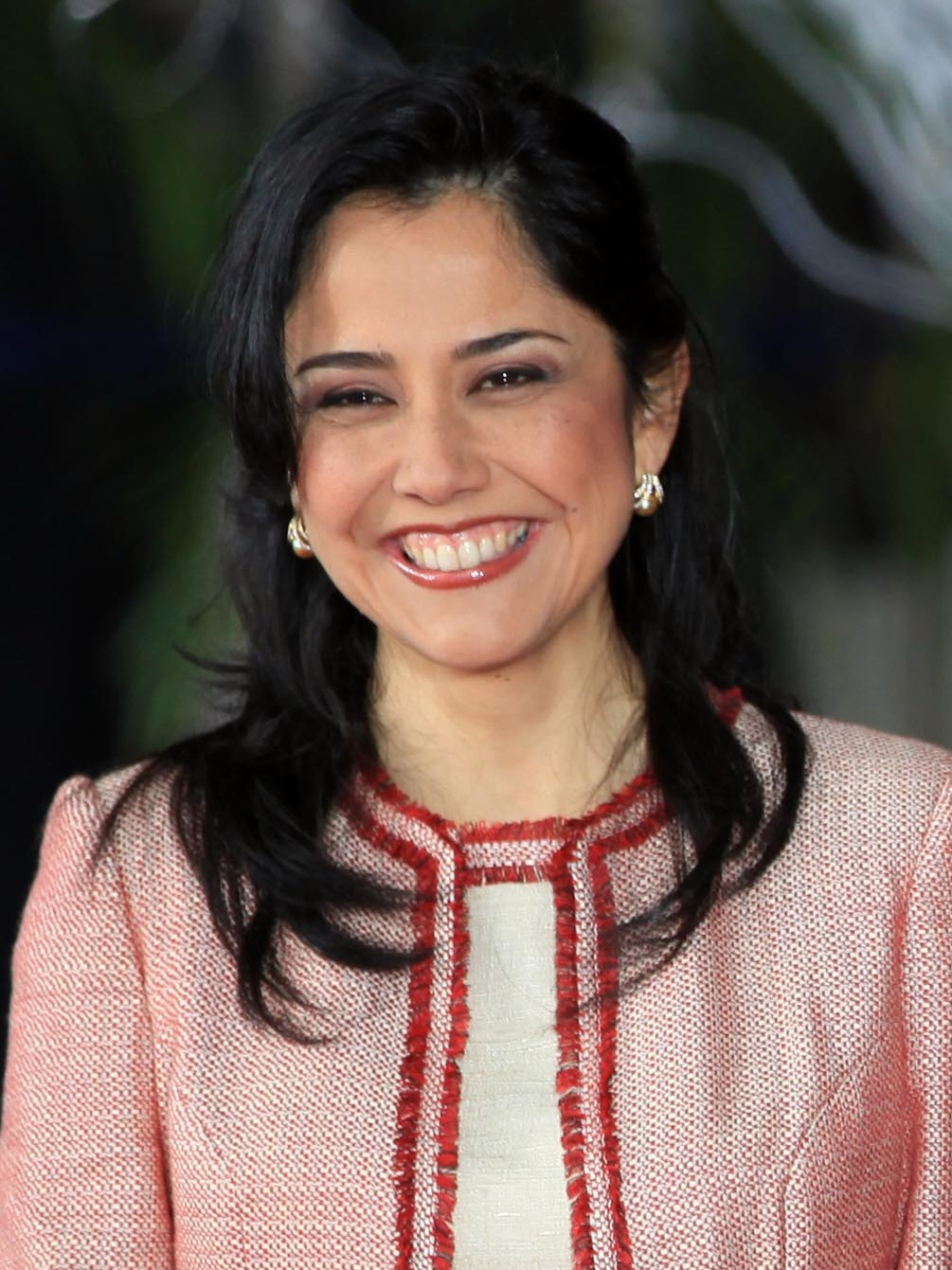

First Lady of Peru
- In role 28 July 2011 – 28 July 2016
- President: Ollanta Humala
- Preceded by: Pilar Nores de García
- Succeeded by: Nancy Lange

President of the Peruvian Nationalist Party
- In office 30 December 2013 – 26 August 2016
- Preceded by: Ollanta Humala
- Succeeded by: Ollanta Humala

Personal details
- Born: Nadine Heredia Alarcón; 25 May 1976 (age 50) Lima, Peru
- Party: Peruvian Nationalist Party
- Spouse: Ollanta Humala (m. 1999)
- Children: 3

Nadine Heredia Alarcón de Humala (born 25 May 1976) is a Peruvian politician. As the wife of President of Peru Ollanta Humala, she served as the First Lady of Peru from 2011 to 2016. The President of the Peruvian Nationalist Party (PNP), which formed the Peru Wins electoral alliance in 2011, Heredia is seen as a highly influential figure in Peruvian politics. She has headed the PNP since December 2013.

== Early life and education ==
Both Heredia and her husband had parents who raised them in Quechua-speaking households as children.

== Career ==
She collaborated in the establishment of the Peruvian Nationalist Party, which she currently leads. She was considered a potential candidate in the 2016 Peruvian presidential election, but chose not to run.

As of 2017, the Peruvian justice system is investigating her for serious cases of corruption, usurpation of power and money laundering. The funds were allegedly used to finance President Ollanta Humala's election campaign.

Along with her husband, she was arrested on 13 July 2017 in connection with this scandal, and was ordered to be held for 18 months.

On 15 April 2025, Heredia and Humala were convicted and sentenced to 15 years' imprisonment for money laundering over their involvement in the Odebrecht scandal. On the same day, she requested right of asylum for her and her then-underage son, Samin Mallko Ollanta Humala Heredia, at the Brazilian Embassy in Lima.

Following the 1954 Convention on Diplomatic Asylum, to which both countries are signatories, the request was authorized and they fled to Brazil, landing in country's capital Brasília on 16 April.
