= Susana Higuchi =

Peruvian politician (1950–2021)

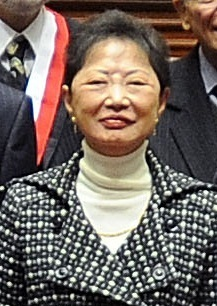
- Higuchi in 2011

First Lady of Peru
- In role 28 July 1990 – 23 August 1994
- President: Alberto Fujimori
- Preceded by: Pilar Nores de García
- Succeeded by: Keiko Fujimori

Member of Congress
- In office 26 July 2000 – 26 July 2006
- Constituency: National (2000–2001); Lima (2001–2006)

Personal details
- Born: Susana Shizuko Higuchi Miyagawa; 26 April 1950 Lima, Peru
- Died: 8 December 2021 (aged 71) Lima, Peru
- Party: FIM (until 2006)
- Spouse: Alberto Fujimori (m. 1974; div. 1995)
- Children: 4, including Keiko and Kenji
- Education: Universidad Nacional de Ingeniería
- Website: congreso.gob.pe/congresista/2001/shiguchi.htm

Susana Shizuko Higuchi Miyagawa (Note: Spanish pronunciation: [suˈsana ʃiˈsuko jˈɣutʃi miʝaˈɣawa]; Japanese: 樋口 静子, romanized: Higuchi Shizuko, Japanese pronunciation: [çiꜜɡɯtɕi ɕiꜜzɯko]) (26 April 1950 – 8 December 2021) was a Peruvian politician and engineer. She served as First Lady of Peru from 1990 to 1994 as the wife of president Alberto Fujimori. In 1994, she described her husband as a "corrupt tyrant" and divorced him in 1995. She was replaced as First Lady by their daughter, future president Keiko Fujimori.

Higuchi was elected as a member of the Independent Moralizing Front (Frente Independiente Moralizador, FIM), a reformist political party allied with then president Alejandro Toledo, in both the 2000 and 2001 general elections. She served as a member of Congress for two terms from 2000 to 2006.

== Early life ==
Of Japanese descent, Higuchi was born in Lima, Peru. She attended Universidad Nacional de Ingenieria specializing in hydraulics, working for the El Sol tire company and established her family in La Victoria District, Lima. Higuchi was often viewed as being independent and outspoken, initiating the first steps of her relationship with Alberto Fujimori despite the disagreement of her parents. The two spent four months dating, with Higuchi noting Fujimori's resemblance to her brother who died in a motorcycle accident and their shared interest in science and statistics.

== Career ==
After marrying Fujimori, she opened the company Construcciones Fuji, often directing workers in her daily outfit of a regular shirt, jeans and boots. At this time, she was the primary income-earner in the family as Fujimori earned a modest professor salary, creating an unequal and strained relationship.

== First Lady of Peru ==
As first lady during her husband's presidency, Higuchi was among the early people in Peru to allege criminal misdoings on the part of her husband. As early as 1992, she denounced several of her Fujimori in-laws for corruption in connection, especially Juana and Rosa Fujimori, alleging Fujimori's sisters sold used clothing donated by Japan for millions of dollars. The Congress of Peru had begun to investigate the allegations, though President Fujimori initiated the 1992 Peruvian coup d'état and dissolved Congress before any formal inquiries could begin.

In 1994, she publicly condemned her husband as a tyrant and his government as corrupt. Fujimori reacted by formally stripping her of the title First Lady in August 1994, appointing their elder daughter Keiko First Lady in her place. Higuchi thereupon established her own political party, the Harmony 21st century, and announced her intention to enter politics as a candidate for mayor of Lima in the 1995 elections. In December 1994 the Harmony party was ruled ineligible because it failed to muster the required number of signatures to qualify as a legitimate political party.

Because of her outspokenness, Higuchi was subjected to repeated efforts to silence her. Peru's media, which operated in accordance to President Fujimori, also ignored stories regarding the alleged abuses against Higuchi. One journalist of Channel 2, Juan Subauste, said that they interviewed Higuchi in 1994 in the Plaza Mayor where she said that she was mistreated and locked in her room, though the interview was never reported in Peru until the 2000s due to the oversight of Channel 2 by the National Intelligence Service of Vladimiro Montesinos. In 2001, she told investigators probing the corruption of the Fujimori years that she had been tortured "five hundred times" by the intelligence services of the Peruvian Army. Fujimori denied that Higuchi had been tortured. He said the scars on her back and neck were not caused by torture, but were the result of the traditional Chinese and Japanese therapy moxibustion, which Higuchi underwent to help her stop smoking and to relieve back troubles.

In July 2001, she alleged that in 1990, shortly before coming to power, her ex-husband received a donation of US$12.5 million from Japanese citizens destined for poor children in Peru, but he deposited it in a private bank account in Japan.

== Personal life ==
Higuchi married Alberto Fujimori on 25 July 1974 and formally divorced him in 1995. They have four children: Keiko Sofía, Hiro Alberto, Sachi Marcela, and Kenji Gerardo. Higuchi died of cancer in 2021. In 2026, Keiko was elected Peru's first female president.

Higuchi was a Catholic.
