= Pilar Nores =

Argentine-born Peruvian economist

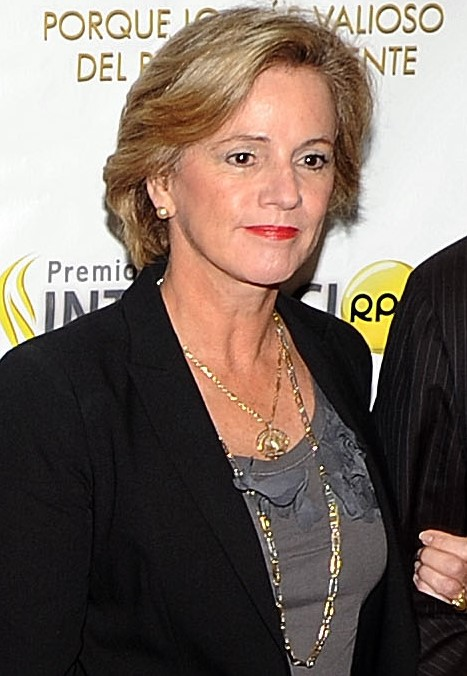

First Lady of Peru
- In role 28 July 2006 – 28 July 2011
- President: Alan García
- Preceded by: Eliane Karp
- Succeeded by: Nadine Heredia
- In role 28 July 1985 – 28 July 1990
- President: Alan García
- Preceded by: Violeta Correa Miller de Belaúnde
- Succeeded by: Susana Higuchi

Personal details
- Born: María del Pilar Nores Bodereau; 11 March 1949 (age 77) Cordoba, Argentina
- Citizenship: Peruvian; Argentine
- Spouse: Alan García (m. 1978; died 2019)
- Children: 4
- Education: University of Cordoba; London School of Economics
- Profession: Economist

María del Pilar Nores Bodereau de García (born 11 March 1949) is an Argentine-born Peruvian economist and the widow of former President of Peru Alan García. She was that nation's First Lady on two occasions.

== Biography ==
Born in Córdoba, Argentina, Pilar Nores was the thirteenth of fourteen children of a traditional family; her father, Rogelio Nores Martínez, served as interim Governor of Córdoba from 1962 to 1963, and was Director of the National University of Córdoba from 1967 to 1970. She completed her primary and secondary education at the Alejandro Carbó School, obtaining her high school diploma at the Manuel Belgrano High School. She enrolled at the National University of Córdoba, and earned a degree in Economics in 1969. She traveled in 1976 to Madrid, where she attended a seminar and met Alan García, a Peruvian lawyer and APRA activist. They were married in 1978, and returned to Peru, where Alan García was elected to Congress in 1980, and as President of Peru in 1985. The couple had four children: three daughters, Josefina, Gabriela del Pilar and Luciana Victoria; and a son, Alan Raúl Simón. A first cousin of her father, Víctor Hipólito Martínez, served as Vice President of Argentina from 1983 to 1989.

During her husband's first presidential period (1985–1990) she created and directed the non-profit Fundación por los Niños del Perú (Foundation for the Children of Peru), a non-governmental organization working with abandoned children. She also initiated and directed the Programa de Asistencia Directa (Direct Assistance Program), a government program promoting the economic and social development of women and infants in Peru.

She created the Instituto Trabajo y Familia (Institute for Labor and Family - ITYF) in 2001, a non-profit NGO that promotes social and productive development. She started the Juvenile Violence Program to develop and implement prevention plans against juvenile delinquency in the most difficult districts of Lima. Returning as First Lady upon her husband's election in 2006, Mrs. Nores de García had the First Lady's Office terminated. She instead inaugurated the Sembrando Program, a plan that works with the families of Andean communities in Peru, many of whom live in extreme poverty. Installing over 92,000 kitchen and sanitation fixtures in impoverished homes, Sembrando (Sowing) promotes job training and technological innovation to enhance productivity and social development in these communities.

She and Alan García were separated in 2010, and upon the end of his tenure in 2011, she retired as First Lady with high approval ratings among the Peruvian public.
