= Mary Peña Carruitero =

First Lady of Peru

First Lady of Peru
- In role 10 November 2020 – 15 November 2020
- President: Manuel Merino
- Preceded by: Maribel Díaz Cabello
- Succeeded by: Lilia Paredes

Personal details
- Born: Mary Jacqueline Peña Carruitero; 17 November 1963 (age 62) Tumbes, Peru
- Party: Popular Action (2004–present)
- Spouse: Manuel Merino (m. 1985)
- Children: 3
- Occupation: Educator

Mary Jacqueline Peña Carruitero (born 17 November 1963) is a Peruvian educator who served as First Lady of Peru from 10 November 2020 to 15 November of the same year.

== Early life and education ==
Mary Yacqueline Peña Carruitero was born on 17 November 1963 in the northern city of Tumbes. In 1985, he married Manuel Merino, the couple have three children, Elba Jacqueline, Sandra Lisbeth and María Teresa.
