= Nancy Lange =

American investment advisor and First Lady of Peru (2016–18)

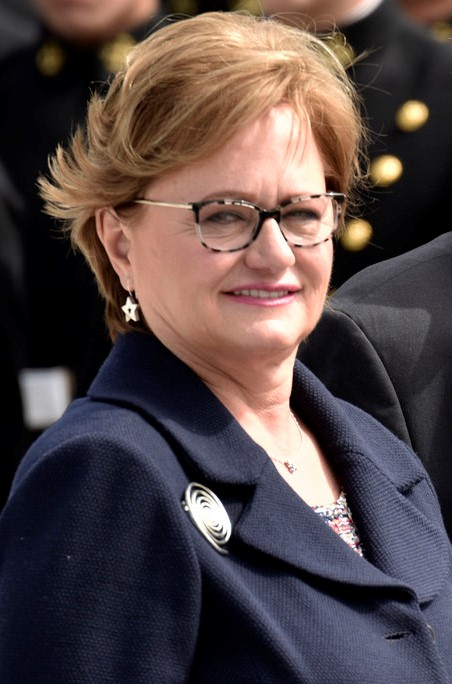
- Lange in 2016

First Lady of Peru
- In office July 28, 2016 – March 23, 2018
- President: Pedro Pablo Kuczynski
- Preceded by: Nadine Heredia
- Succeeded by: Maribel Díaz Cabello

Personal details
- Born: Nancy Ann Lange; January 20, 1954 (age 72) Baraboo, Wisconsin, U.S.
- Spouse: Pedro Pablo Kuczynski (m. 1996)
- Children: 1
- Education: University of Wisconsin–Madison (MBA)

Nancy Ann Lange Kuczynski (born January 20, 1954) is an American investment and marketing professional and Peruvian resident. She served as the First Lady of Peru from 2016 to 2018 as the wife of President Pedro Pablo Kuczynski.

== Life and work ==
Lange is from the town of Rock Springs, Wisconsin and was born in nearby Baraboo, Wisconsin in 1954. She has three siblings - one sister and two brothers. She is not the cousin of American actress Jessica Lange, although this has been widely reported in the media. Lange studied political science and international relations at the University of Wisconsin. She then received her Master of Business Administration (MBA) from the School of Business at the University of Wisconsin. Following the completion of her MBA, Lange lived and worked abroad in Japan and other countries.

Lange married Pedro Pablo Kuczynski, an economist and politician, in 1996. The couple have one daughter together, Suzanne, who graduated in biology from Princeton University.

During the 2016 Peruvian general election, Lange played an essential role in her husband's campaign as an advisor and organizer. She traveled extensively to campaign on his behalf. Lange created "Chambeando por el Perú", which promoted a series of social reforms in remote areas of the country.

== First Lady of Peru ==
Nancy Lange became First Lady of Peru on July 28, 2016.

One of Lange's first public events as first lady was the march protesting violence against women known as "Ni una menos." She has extensively promoted firemen's efforts in Lima, as well other education and health initiatives across the country.
