= INGEMMET =

Peruvian scientific and management agency

- Instituto Geológico Minero y Metalúrgico

Agency overview
- Formed: December 5, 1978; 47 years ago
- Preceding agencies: Instituto de Geología y Minería (INGEOMIN); Instituto Científico y Tecnológico Minero (INCITEMI)
- Jurisdiction: Peru
- Headquarters: Lima, Peru
- Website: portal.ingemmet.gob.pe

The Instituto Geológico Minero y Metalúrgico (INGEMMET) is a Peruvian scientific and management agency part of the Ministry of Energy and Mines. It is devoted to the study of the mineral resources, geology of Peru and the regulation of mineral rights in that country.

== Volcano surveillance ==
Observatorio Vulcanológico INGEMMET (OVI) is the division of INGEMMET in charge of the study of volcanic activity and potential hazards due to that activity.
