= Jaime Quijandría Salmón =

Peruvian economist and politician

Jaime Quijandría Salmón (June 19, 1943 – December 30, 2013) was a Peruvian economist and politician.

== Early life ==
Born in Lima in 1943 to Benjamín and Lola Quijandría Salmón, he studied economics at the National Agrarian University in 1965. He went on to obtain a master's degree in Social Sciences with a major in economics at The Hague University of Applied Sciences in 1968. He also graduated in 1971 with a PhD in Economics and Government at the University of Essex in the UK.

== Political career ==
From July 28, 2001, until July 2003, he was the Minister of Energy and Mines. On July 25, 2003, he was appointed Minister of Economy and Finance, where he served until February 2004, when he returned to the Ministry of Energy office to serve until October of that year.

He died from pulmonary fibrosis at the age of 70 in December 2013.
