= Joseph E. Casey =

American politician (1898–1980)

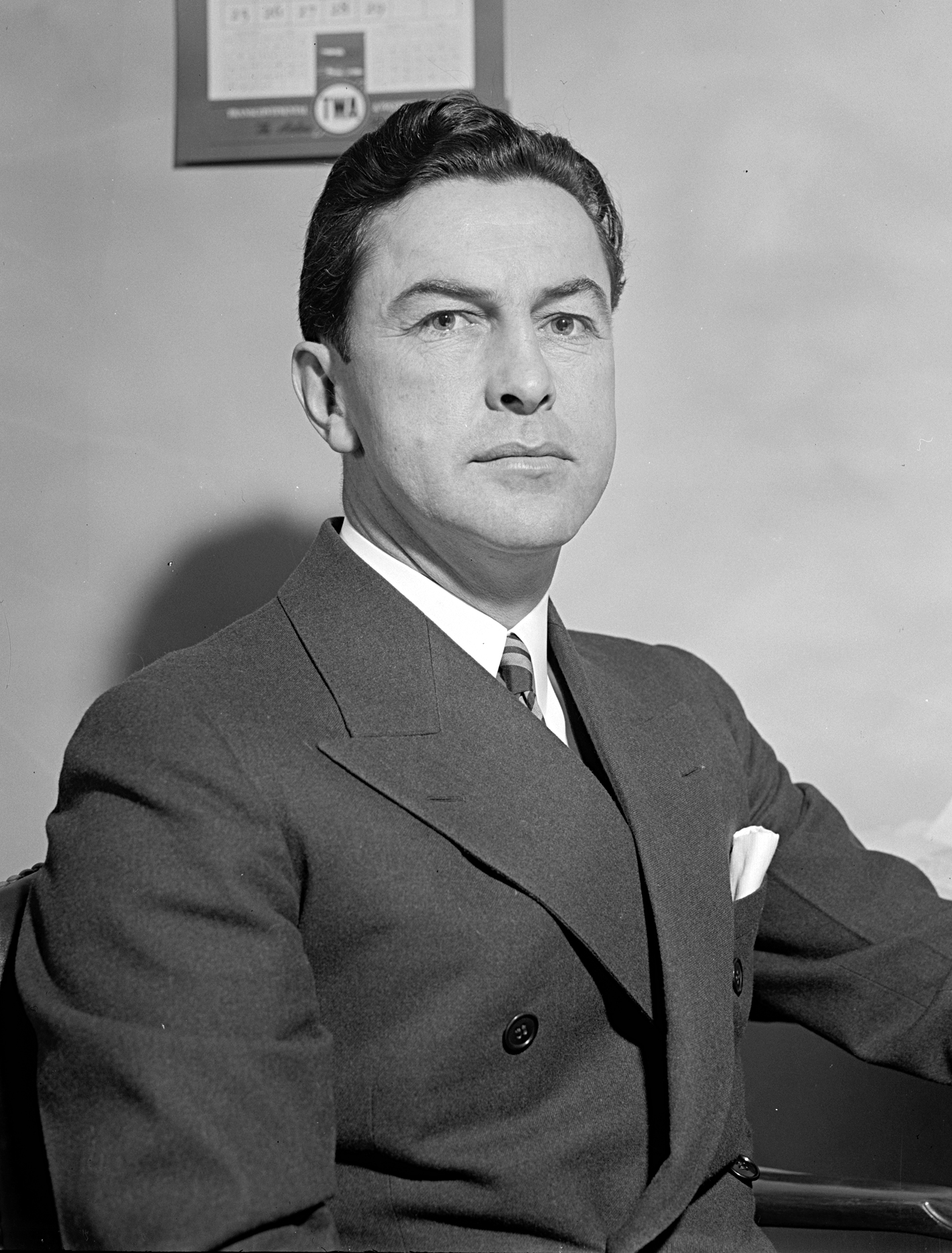

Member of the U.S. House of Representatives from Massachusetts's 3rd district
- In office January 3, 1935 – January 3, 1943
- Preceded by: Frank H. Foss
- Succeeded by: Philip J. Philbin

Personal details
- Born: Joseph Edward Casey; December 27, 1898 Clinton, Massachusetts
- Died: September 1, 1980 (aged 81) Washington, D.C.
- Party: Democratic
- Children: John Casey; Jane Dudley Casey
- Relatives: Alex Kuczynski (granddaughter)
- Education: Boston University School of Law
- Profession: Lawyer

Military service
- Allegiance: United States of America
- Branch/service: United States Army
- Years of service: 1918
- Rank: Private

Joseph Edward Casey (December 27, 1898 – September 1, 1980) was a United States representative from Massachusetts. Born in Clinton, he attended the public schools, served as a private in the United States Army at Fort Lee, Virginia, in 1918, and graduated from the Boston University School of Law in 1920. He was admitted to the bar that year and commenced practice in Clinton. He was a delegate to the Democratic National Conventions in 1924, 1932, 1936, 1940, and 1944, and was elected as a Democrat to the Seventy-fourth and to the three succeeding Congresses (January 3, 1935, to January 3, 1943). He was not a candidate for renomination in 1942 to the Seventy-eighth Congress and was an unsuccessful candidate for election to the United States Senate. He resumed the practice of law in Boston and in Washington, D.C., where he resided until his death. Interment was in Arlington National Cemetery, Section 1, Lot 761-B.

== Personal life ==
His son is novelist John Casey. His daughter Jane Dudley Casey was the first wife of Pedro Pablo Kuczynski, who later became the 59th President of Peru from 2016 to 2018. His granddaughter is journalist and writer Alex Kuczynski. His daughter, Caroline Casey, has been described as "a well-known Washington astrologer."

== See also ==
- List of members of the House Un-American Activities Committee

Party political offices
Preceded by James Michael Curley	Democratic nominee for U.S. Senator from Massachusetts (Class 2); 1942	Succeeded by John H. Corcoran
U.S. House of Representatives
Preceded by Frank H. Foss	Member of the U.S. House of Representatives from Massachusetts's 3rd congressional district January 3, 1935-January 3, 1943	Succeeded by Philip J. Philbin
