= Battle of Velika Hoča =

1905 skirmish of the Macedonian Struggle

- Part of Macedonian Struggle
| Date | 25 May 1905 |
| Location | Velika Hoča, Ottoman Empire (modern-day Kosovo) 42.3842°N 20.6767°E |
| Result | Ottoman victory |

Belligerents
| Serbian Chetnik Organization | (Ottoman Empire) Albanian mob from Orahovac (Ottoman Empire) Ottoman askeri |

Commanders and leaders
| Lazar Kujundžić †; Savatije Milošević †; Živojin Milovanović † | |

Strength
| 7 | Large Albanian mob, some Ottoman soldiers |

Casualties and losses
| All killed | 40+ |
- Location of Velika Hoča in Kosovo

The Battle of Velika Hoča (Serbian: Борба у Великој Хочи) was fought between the Serbian Chetnik Organization, a Serbian rebel faction, and Ottoman irregulars from Orahovac, Kosovo, on 25 May 1905.

== Prelude ==
The Battle of Čelopek (16 April 1905), fought between 120 Serbian guerillas and Ottoman officers accompanied by Ottoman Albanian bashi-bozuks, ended in a great victory after the guerillas managed to overtake three peaks; the Ottomans had over 200 dead and wounded, while the guerrillas only had 2 dead. The victory enraged the Ottomans, who began a manhunt for the rebels. The rebels were forced to retreat across the border, and the bands were subsequently dispersed. The bands intended to cross Ibarski Kolašin, Prizrenska Gora, Šar Mountains and Suva Planina to their respective areas. The journey of Lazar Kujundžić's armed cheta group proved catastrophic.

== Battle ==
A group of seven fighters, led by vojvoda Lazar Kujundžić, vojvoda Savatije Milošević and sub-lieutenant Živojin Milovanović, arrived at night-time 24–25 May [O.S. 6–7 June] at the village of Velika Hoča near Prizren. This group returned to the field having crossed Kuršumlija, Podujevo, Ibarski Kolašin and Podrinje. The group's leader, the teacher Kujundžić, knew very well the customs and language of the Albanians. Velika Hoča was a Serbian village with only two Albanian tower houses (kule). In order to prevent the Albanians from taking out their revenge on the Velika Hoča Serbs, Kujundžić chose to pay a tribute to one of the Albanian houses, whose host gave him his word (besa).

As the Chetniks had supper and fell asleep, the Albanian notified the Albanians of the nearby town of Orahovac. A mob of 1,500 Albanians, and some Ottoman soldiers, surrounded the house. The Ottoman yuzbashi (captain) called for the Chetniks to give themselves up, to which the Chetniks answered with a bullet hail, killing the captain and four askeri. The fusillade continued over the day, until dusk, when a group of Albanians broke into the lower floor, which, as in all kule, was the stable for cattle. They shot through the ceiling, managing to kill five of the Chetniks, then set the house on fire. The remaining two jumped out of the house shooting, but were instantly killed. According to documents of the Consulate in Pristina, more than 40 Albanians and Ottoman soldiers died during the fight.

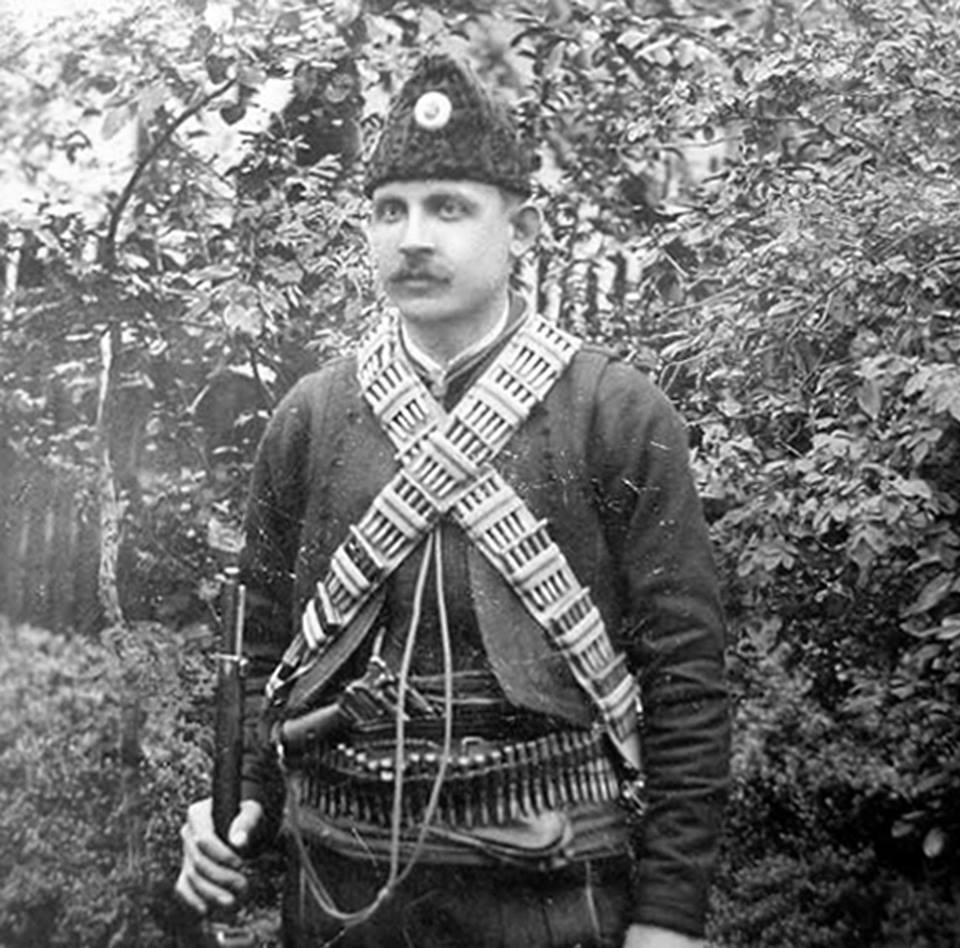
Lazar Kujundžić

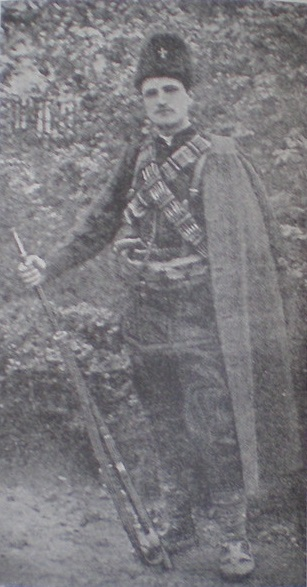
Živojin Milovanović

== Aftermath and legacy ==
The Ottomans brought Jadranka, the mother of Kujundžić, to recognize his body. She replied that her son was a daskal (teacher), and no kaçak (outlaw), and that the body was of somebody else. Inspired by this event, count Ivo Vojnović wrote a drama in verse, Lazarevo Vaskrsenje ("Lazar's Resurrection"). Serbian major and Chetnik vojvoda Božin Simić cited that Kujundžić's mother's words were: "No, that is not my son. I was unlucky to have not given birth to such a hero." (Ne to nije moj sin. Ja nisam imala sreću da rodim takvog junaka). Serbian major Milosav Jelić, a journalist and Chetnik, published the poem Kujundžića majka ("Kujundžić's Mother") in the collection of Srbijanski venac.

Serbian history books about the Serbian Chetnik Organization call the group heroes.

== See also ==
- Battle of Tabanovce (1905)
- Battle of Čelopek (1905)
- Battle of Čelopek (1906)

== Annotations ==
1. Lazar Kujundžić • Savatije Milošević • Živojin Milovanović • Kosta Karaperić-Konjuški • Tasa Milenković • Staniša Šević • Stanoje Mikić
2. The name of the Albanian host differs in sources. According to Krvave borbe, his name was "Husein"; according to Pećanac, "kmet Ajruš"; according to M. Milenković, "Lanja Ukin" (or Ljama Ukin).

== Sources ==
- Đurić, Veljko Đ.; Mijović, Miličko (1993). Ilustrovana istorija četničkog pokreta (in Serbian).
- Ilić, Vladimir (2006). Српска четничка акција 1903-1912 (in Serbian). Belgrade: Ecolibri. ISBN 978-86-7905-044-1.
- Jovanović, Aleksa (1937). Spomenica dvadesetogodišnjice oslobodjenja Južne Srbije, 1912-1937 (in Serbian). Južna Srbija.
- Krakov, Stanislav (1990) [1930]. Plamen četništva (in Serbian). Belgrade: Hipnos.
- Anđelko M. Krstić, ed. (1927). "Погибија наших четника у Великој Хочи". Južni pregled: list za nauku i književnost. pp. 272–278.
