= March 1905 =

Month of 1905

<<	March 1905					>>
Su	Mo	Tu	We	Th	Fr	Sa
			1	2	3	4
5	6	7	8	9	10	11
12	13	14	15	16	17	18
19	20	21	22	23	24	25
26	27	28	29	30	31

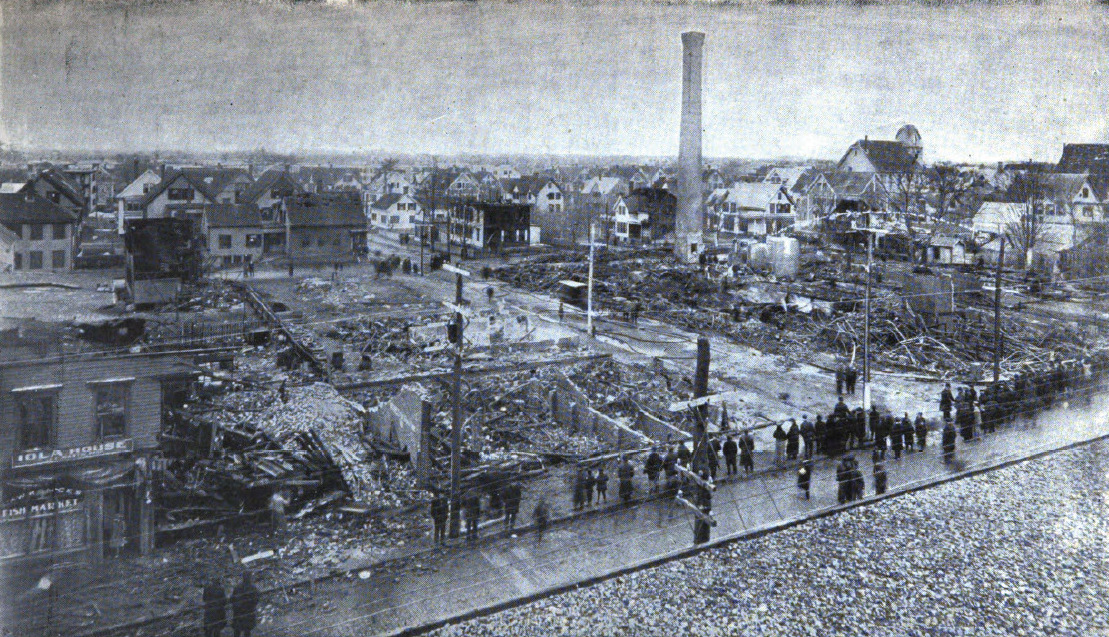
March 20, 1905: Explosion in U.S. shoe factory kills 58 employees

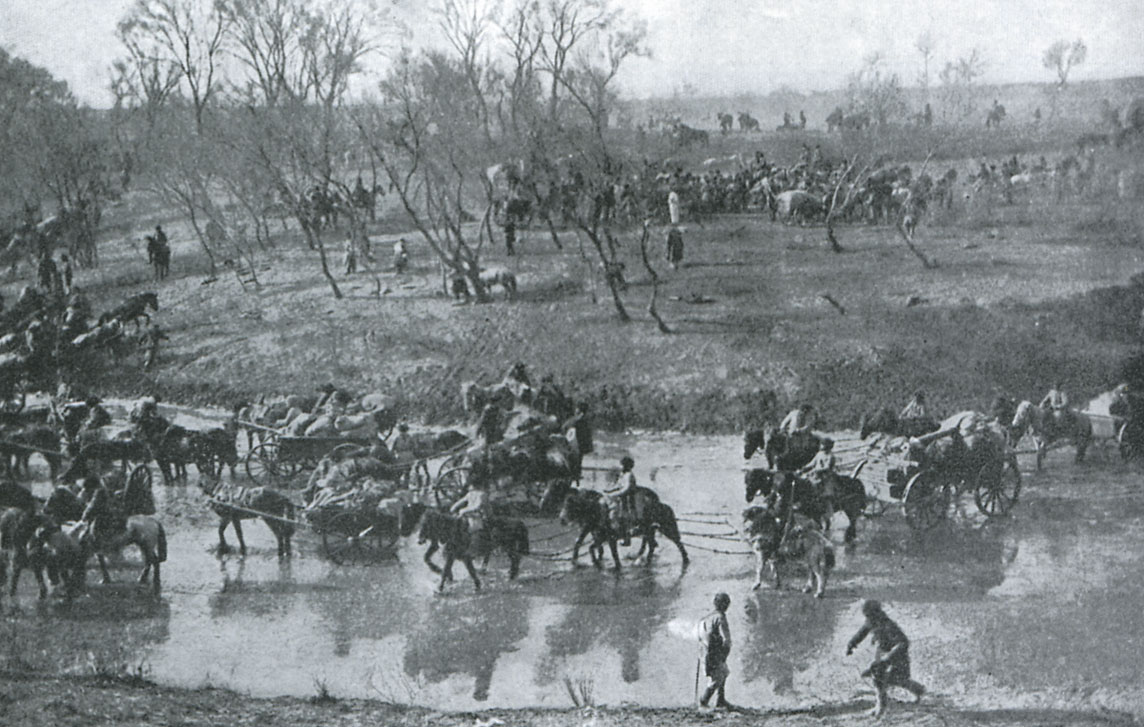
March 5, 1905: General Kuropatkin orders Russian Imperial Army to retreat from the Japanese after disastrous battle in Mukden

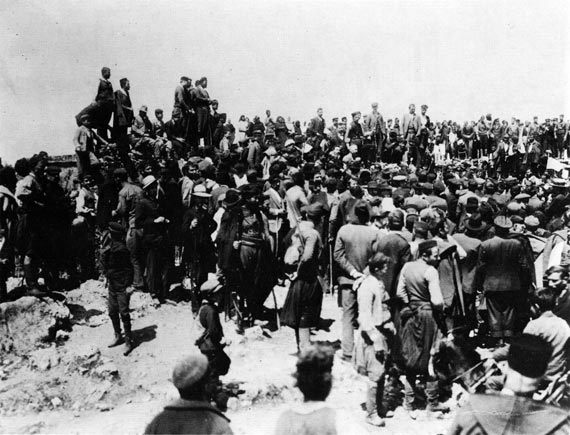
March 23, 1905: General Venizelos attempts a revolution on the island of Crete

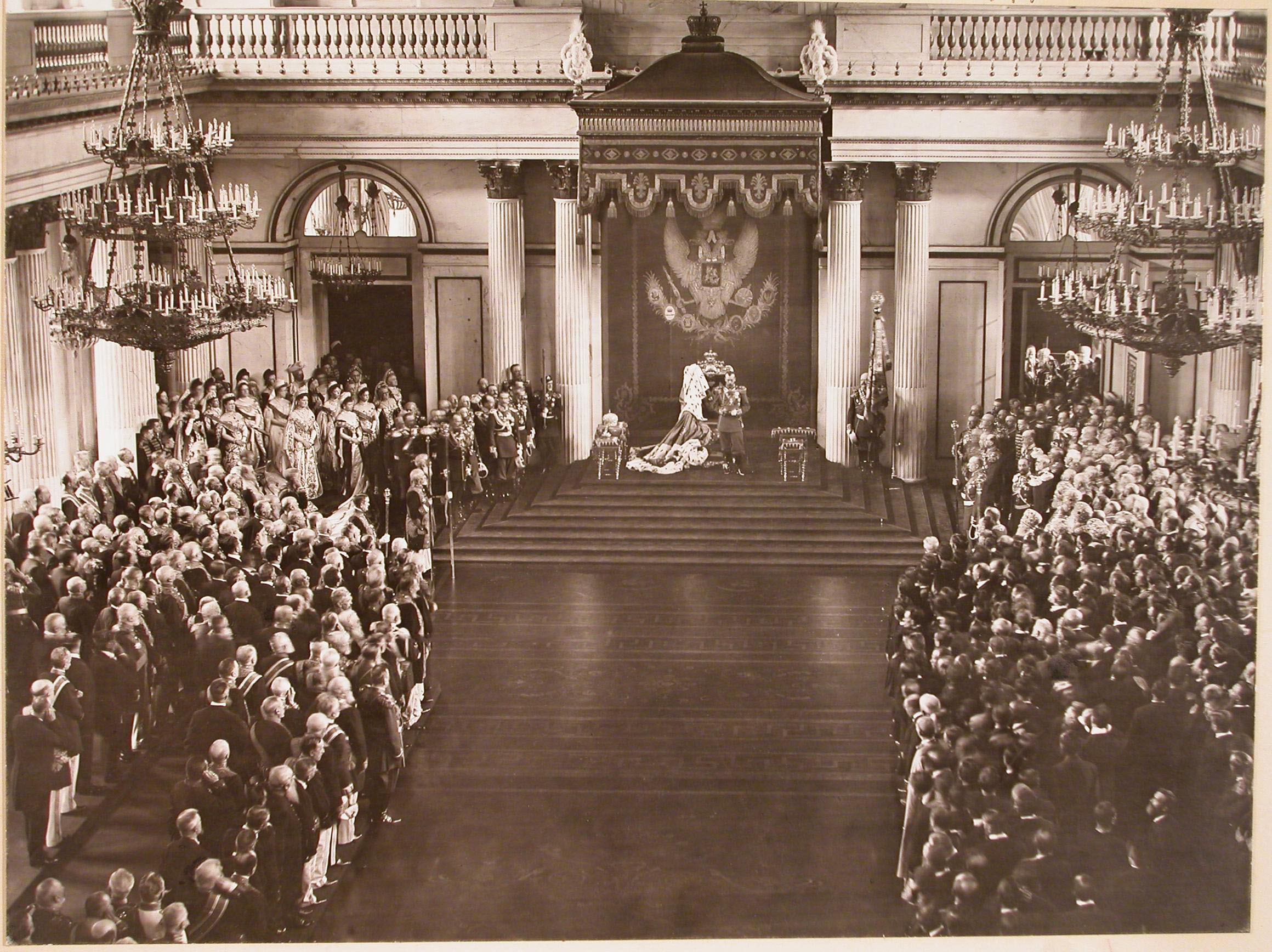
March 3, 1905: Tsar Nicholas II creates the Duma, Russia's first representative assembly

The following events occurred in March 1905:

== March 1, 1905 (Wednesday) ==
- U. S. Secretary of State John Hay gave assurances to the Ambassador from Haiti that the U.S. had no intention of annexing the Dominican Republic.
- Lord Selborne (William Palmer), the British First Lord of the Admiralty, resigned to accept the position of High Commissioner for Southern Africa, to succeed Lord Milner.
- Died: Jean-Baptiste Claude Eugène Guillaume, 83, French sculptor

== March 2, 1905 (Thursday) ==
- Russia's Committee of Ministers voted to grant religious freedom to the residents of the Russian Empire.

== March 3, 1905 (Friday) ==
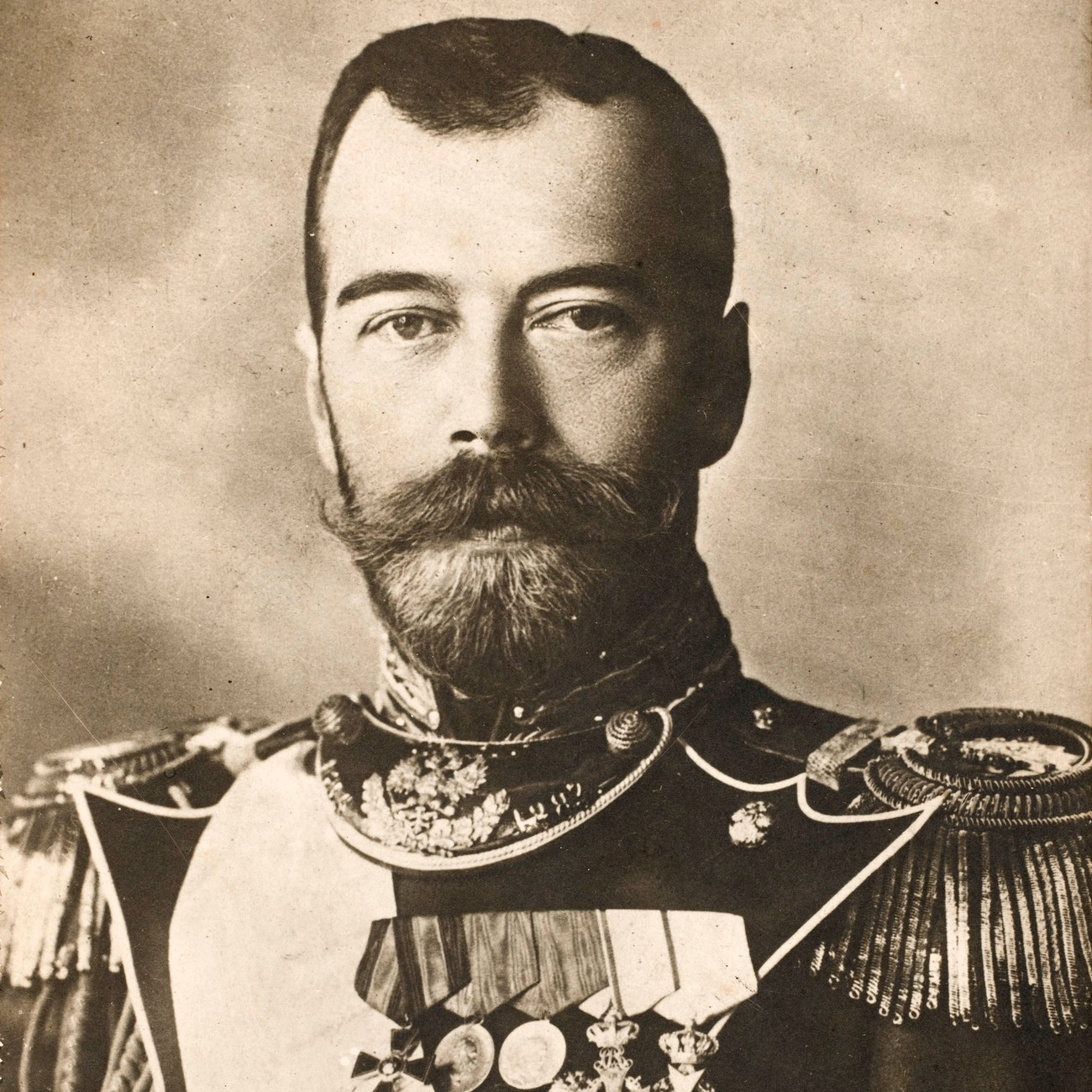
Nicholas II

- Tsar Nicholas II of Russia announced his decision to create an elected assembly, the Imperial State Duma, to represent the people of the Russian Empire in an advisory capacity, although the real power to make laws remained with the Tsar and the cabinet of ministers.
- Born: Marie Glory (stage name for Raymonde Toully), French film actress; in Mortagne-au-Perche, Orne département (d. 2009)
- Died: A. A. Cruana, 74, Maltese archaeologist

== March 4, 1905 (Saturday) ==
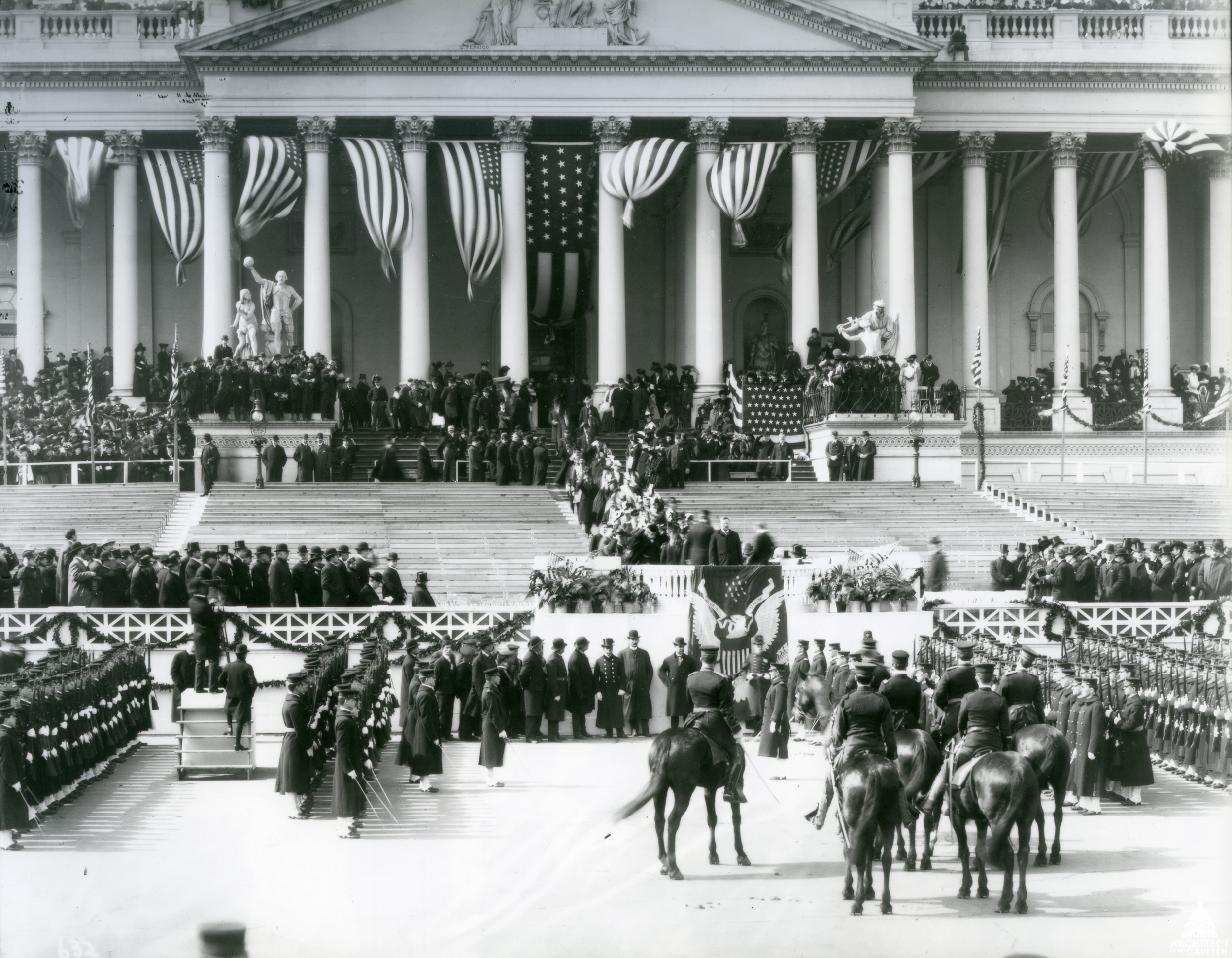
Inauguration day in the U.S.

- The second inauguration of Theodore Roosevelt took place as the incumbent U.S. president, who had taken office in 1901 to fill the remainder of the term of President William McKinley, was sworn in for a full term as 26th President of the United States.
- Newly inaugurated vice president Charles W. Fairbanks called the Fifty-ninth Congress of the United States of America into session.

== March 5, 1905 (Sunday) ==
- In the Russo-Japanese War, the Russian Imperial Army began its retreat from Mukden, after losing 100,000 troops in three days.

== March 6, 1905 (Monday) ==
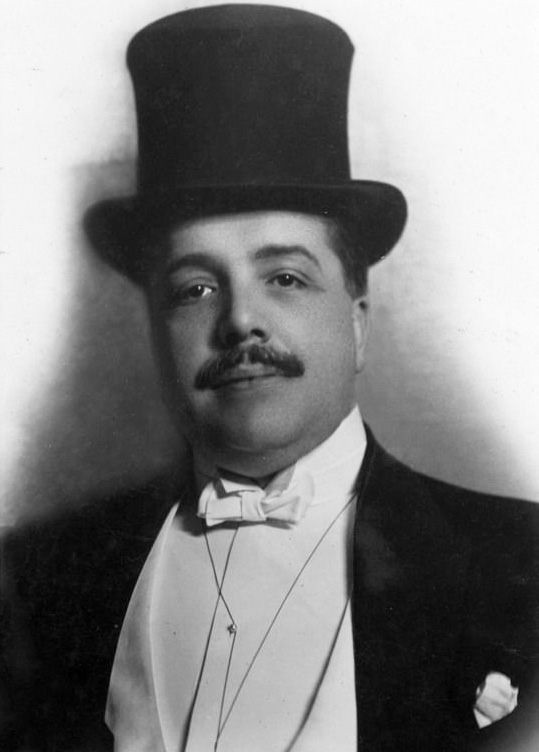
Diaghilev

- Russia's Sergei Diaghilev achieved national fame with the display of over 4,000 paintings at the Tauride Palace in Saint Petersburg. He would go on to worldwide prominence a year later with his touring exhibition in Europe.
- An annular solar eclipse was visible over Australia, with residents of Perth in Western Australia seeing the maximum totality.
- Died:
  - Pierre Boisrond-Canal, 72, President of Haiti 1876-1879, 1888 and 1902
  - John Henninger Reagan, 86, U.S. Representative for Texas who resigned from Congress in 1861 to serve in the government of the Confederate States of America as its Postmaster General during the American Civil War. After the end of the war and the readmission of Texas to the Union, Reagan was re-elected to the U.S. Congress in 1875 and then as a U.S. Senator from 1887 to 1891

== March 7, 1905 (Tuesday) ==
- The UK House of Commons declined to approve remedial measures for evicted Irish tenants in Britain, the legislation receiving 182 votes in favor and 220 against.
- Tsar Nicholas II dissolved a proposed commission to investigate labor disputes in the Russian Empire, after workers organizations refused to send delegates.

== March 8, 1905 (Wednesday) ==
- The U.S. Senate voted to confirm all of the diplomatic and consular appointments made by President Roosevelt.

== March 9, 1905 (Thursday) ==
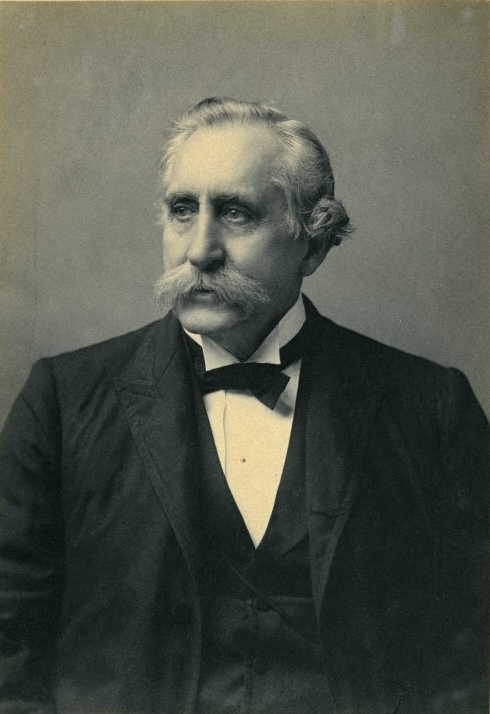
Senator Bate

- U.S. Senator William B. Bate of Tennessee died suddenly from pneumonia, five days after attending the inauguration of the president and the beginning of his fourth term at the opening of the 59th Congress. Bate, who served had three full terms as Senator, had first taken office 18 years and five days earlier, on March 4, 1887. A funeral was held for him the next day in the Senate Chamber of the U.S. Capitol, after which his body was sent back to Nashville.

== March 10, 1905 (Friday) ==
- The Japanese capture of Mukden (modern-day Shenyang) completed the rout of the Russian Imperial Army in Manchuria as the Russo-Japanese War continued. The Russian commander, General Aleksey Kuropatkin, telegraphed the Tsar that his armies would be retreating to avoid further danger.

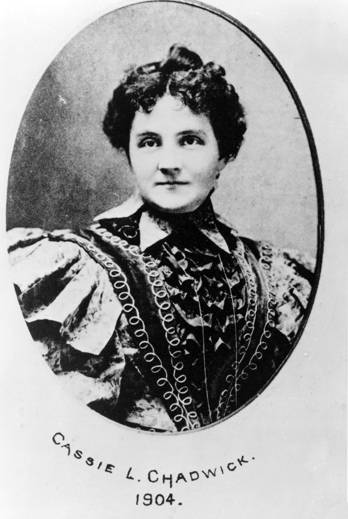
Cassie Chadwick

- Canadian-born swindler Cassie Chadwick, who had claimed to be the daughter and an heiress of multi-millionaire Andrew Carnegie to defraud banks of millions of dollars, was sentenced for 14 years imprisonment after being convicted for fraud against the Citizen's National Bank in Cleveland. She would die in the Ohio State Penitentiary less than three years later, dying on October 10, 1907.
- Born: Richard Haydn (stage name for George Richard Hayden), English-born U.S. actor on stage, film and television; in Camberwell, London (d. 1985)

== March 11, 1905 (Saturday) ==
- Christian Michelsen became the new Prime Minister of Norway, at the time that Norway was part of the United Kingdoms of Sweden and Norway (Förenade Konungarikena Sverige och Norge), with the title of Prime Minister in Christiania. Appointed by King Oscar II of Sweden to succeed Francis Hagerup, Michelsen would become the first Prime Minister of the Kingdom of Norway after the dissolution of the United Kingdoms on October 26.

== March 12, 1905 (Sunday) ==
- Italy's Prime Minister Giovanni Giolitti and his cabinet stepped down, after their resignations and had been announced on March 4 because of Giolitti's illness.
- Born: Takashi Shimura, 76, Japanese film actor who starred in Rashomon, Seven Samurai, and the original Godzilla; in Ikuno, Hyōgo Prefecture (d. 1982)

== March 13, 1905 (Monday) ==
- Entertainer and spy Mata Hari introduced her exotic dance act in the Musée Guimet, Paris.

== March 14, 1905 (Tuesday) ==
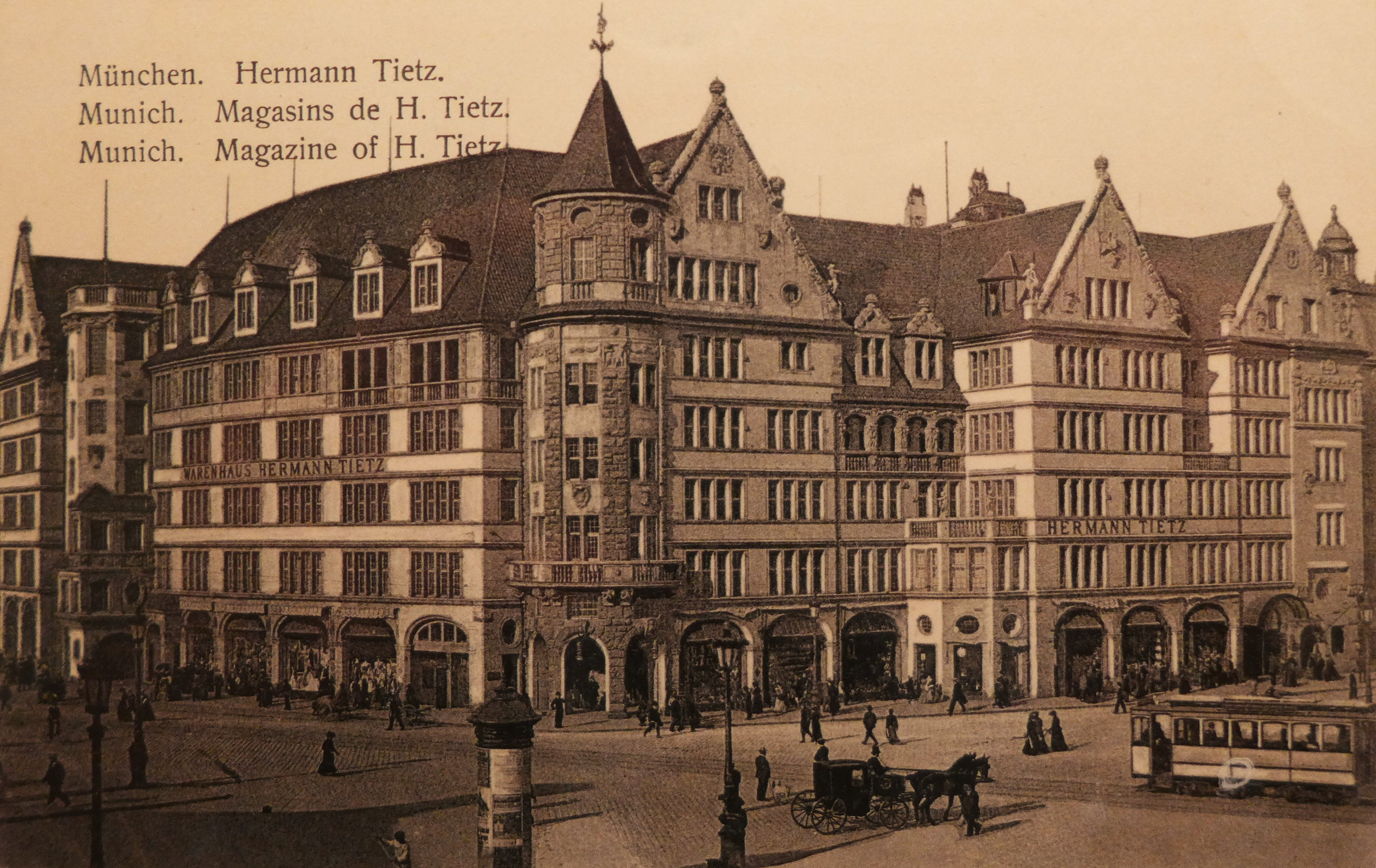
Karstadt Warenhaus

- The massive Karstadt department store, at the time the largest in Germany, opened in the Maxvorstadt borough of Munich, and would remain in operation more than a century later.
- Twenty-three of the 26 crew of the British windjammer ship Kyber died when the ship was wrecked off of the coast of Cornwall and Land's End. Local first responders saved three of the men, and the rest were buried in a mass grave.

== March 15, 1905 (Wednesday) ==
- Oil magnate Zeynalabdin Taghiyev and journalist Alimardan bey Topchubashov held a meeting of Azerbaijani Muslim nationalists who wrote a petition to seek an end to discrimination within the Russian Empire.
- The city of Sparks, Nevada, was incorporated.
- Born: Berthold von Stauffenberg, German aristocrat and lawyer implicated as a conspirator in the 1944 attempt by his brother, Claus von Stauffenberg, to assassinate Adolf Hitler; in Stuttgart (hanged 1944)
- Died:
  - Meyer Guggenheim, 77, Swiss-born American silver mining entrepreneur and patriarch of the Guggenheim family
  - Amalie Skram, 58, Norwegian author and feminist

== March 16, 1905 (Thursday) ==
- James Hamilton Peabody was installed as the governor of the U.S. state Colorado by the Colorado Legislature while the election dispute between himself and Alva Adams was being investigated, on the condition that Peabody resign in favor of Lieutenant Governor J. F. McDonald. Peabody resigned the next day and McDonald became acting governor of Colorado.
- Born: Elisabeth Flickenschildt. German film and television actress; in Hamburg (d. 1977)

== March 17, 1905 (Friday) ==
- Russia's General Aleksey Kuropatkin was relieved of duty from his command of the 1st Manchurian Army, and replaced by General Nikolai Linevich.
- France's Chamber of Deputies voted to reduce the military service requirement for young men to two years.
- U.S. President Theodore Roosevelt, in New York City for the annual St. Patrick's Day celebration, came to the wedding of his 20-year-old niece, Anna Eleanor Roosevelt, to her distant cousin, 23-year old law student Franklin Delano Roosevelt. Theodore, the 26th U.S. President, served the role of "giving the bride away" to Franklin, who would become the 32nd President of the United States in 1933 with Eleanor Roosevelt Roosevelt as his First Lady.

== March 18, 1905 (Saturday) ==
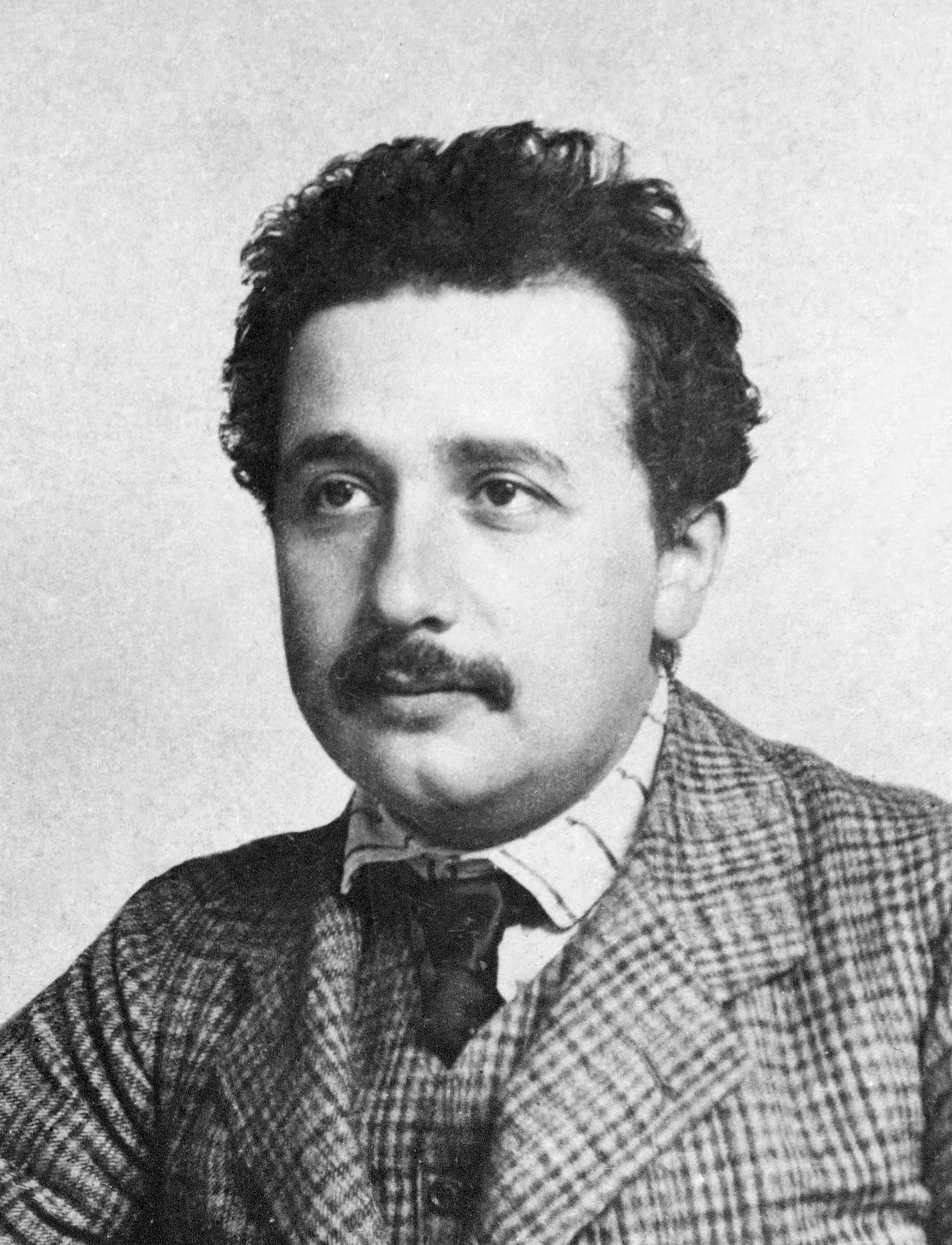
Einstein

- Albert Einstein submitted for publication his paper "On a heuristic viewpoint concerning the production and transformation of light", in which he explained the photoelectric effect using the notion of light quanta. The paper would be published on June 9.
- Born:
  - Robert Donat, English film actor and Academy Award Winner known for Goodbye, Mr. Chips and The 39 Steps; in Withington, Lancashire (d. 1958 from a cerebral thrombosis)
  - Thomas Townsend Brown, American inventor known for his observation of what he called the Biefeld–Brown effect, and for his attempt to build an anti-gravity device; in Zanesville, Ohio (d. 1985)

== March 19, 1905 (Sunday) ==
- Twin explosions killed 24 miners at the Rush Run and Red Ash coal mines near Thurmond, West Virginia.
- Born: Albert Speer, German architect and convicted war criminal who became the Nazi German Minister of Armaments and War Production as a close associate of Adolf Hitler; in Mannheim, Grand Duchy of Baden. Speer served a 20-year prison sentence at Spandau Prison for his use of concentration camp inmates as slave labor in armaments factories, and wrote a best-selling account of the experience after his release. (d. 1981)

== March 20, 1905 (Monday) ==
- The Grover Shoe Factory disaster killed 58 employees in Brockton, Massachusetts, when a boiler exploded and the factory building collapsed.
- Born: Vera Panova, Soviet Russian novelist and playwright; in Rostov-on-Don (d. 1973)

== March 21, 1905 (Tuesday) ==
- "The Treaty of Peace and Friendship" (El tratado de Paz y Amistad) between Chile and Bolivia, signed on October 20, 1904, went into effect, settling the question of the border between the two South American nations. Bolivia ceded the territory of Antofagasta to Chile in return for Chile extending a railroad from the Pacific port of Arica to the Bolivian capital at La Paz.

== March 22, 1905 (Wednesday) ==
- Russia's Committee of Ministers voted to abolish the compulsory use of the Russian language in schools in "Congress Poland" (Tsarstvo Polskoye).

== March 23, 1905 (Thursday) ==
- The Theriso revolt began in Crete as about 1,500 men, led by Eleftherios Venizelos, met at the village of Theriso to challenge the island's authoritarian government and press for its unification with Greece.
- In the U.S. state of Maryland, the state Supreme Court ordered Governor Edwin Warfield to submit a proposed constitutional amendment for disenfranchisement of non-whites to a referendum vote.
- Lord Midleton, Britain's Secretary of State for India, presented a report to the House of Commons that over 346,000 people had died of bubonic plague in India in a single year.
- Kaiser Wilhelm II of Germany signed legislation authorizing the construction of a railway across its colony of Kamerun (now Cameroon) from Jaunde (now Yaounde) to Lake Chad.
- Born:
  - Sir John Randall, British physicist whose improved version of the cavity magnetron made centimetric wavelength radar possible during World War II and was later a key component to the microwave oven; in Newton-le-Willows, Lancashire (d. 1984)
  - Lale Andersen, German singer known for her recording of Lili Marleen, one of the most popular songs in Europe during World War II in the Axis and Allied nations; in Bremerhaven (d. 1972)

== March 24, 1905 (Friday) ==
- "The Toastmasters Club", whose concept would later be used for the 1924 founding of the more successful Toastmasters International, was founded by Ralph C. Smedley in Bloomington, Illinois, an employee of the city's YMCA chapter. With a stated of goal of aiding people in learning how to give public speeches, conduct meetings, plan programs and work on committees, Smedley's first effort failed twice, but he would relaunch the organization on October 22, 1924, in Santa Ana, California.
- The Dow Jones Industrial Average, the measure of average prices on stocks of major industries, reached its highest level since 1890, closing at 79.27 points.

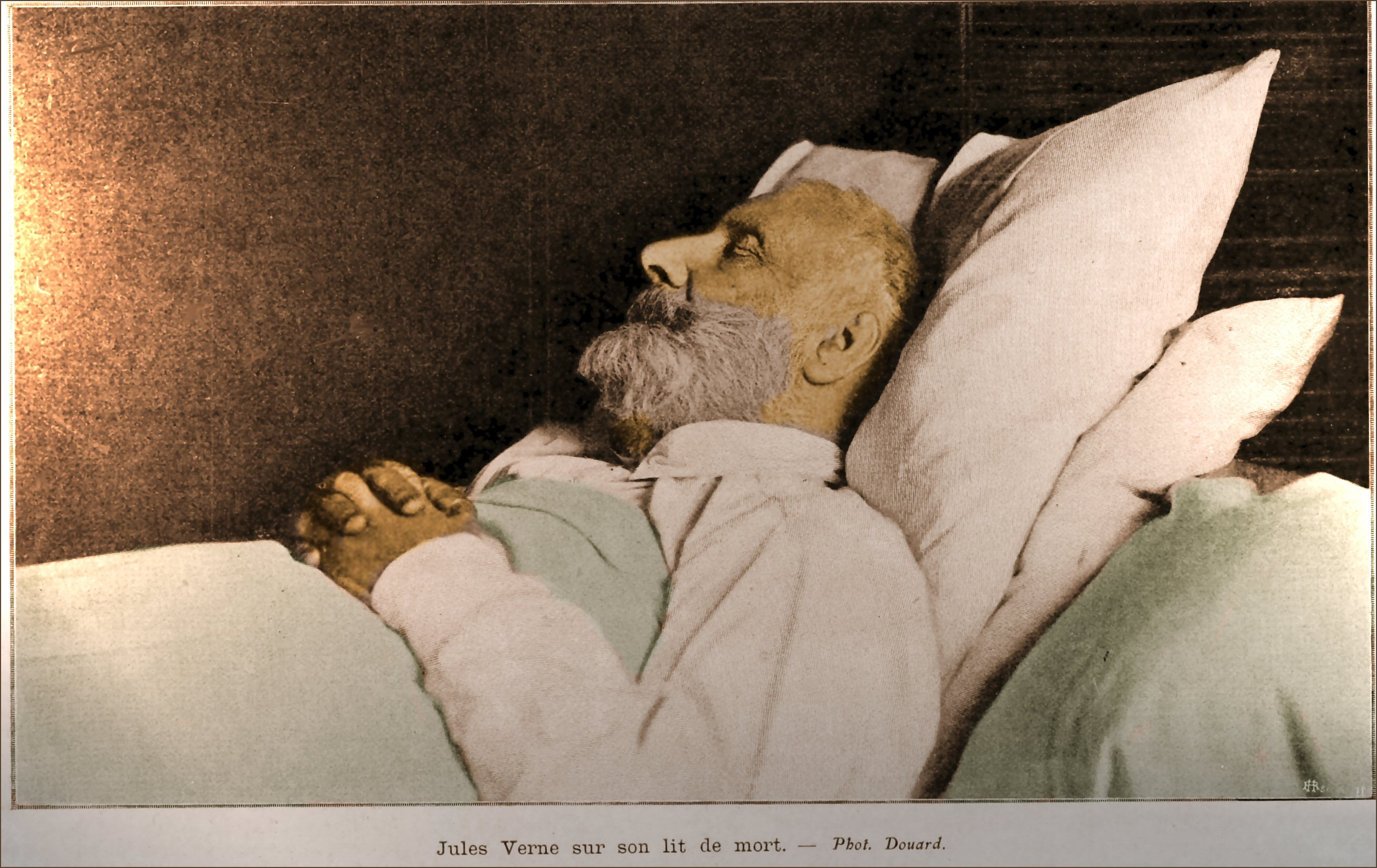
The last photo of Jules Verne

- French science fiction writer Jules Verne, author of Around the World in Eighty Days, Journey to the Center of the Earth and From the Earth to the Moon, died at the age of 77.

== March 25, 1905 (Saturday) ==
- Harvard University and the Massachusetts Institute of Technology both announced a proposal for unification of the two universities. The Harvard-MIT merger would never take place.
- Born: Pote Sarasin, Prime Minister of Thailand 1958 to 1959; in Bangkok, Kingdom of Siam (d. 2000)
- Died: Maurice Barrymore (stage name for Herbert Blythe), 55, Indian-born British stage actor and patriarch of the Barrymore acting family; from complications of syphilis

== March 26, 1905 (Sunday) ==
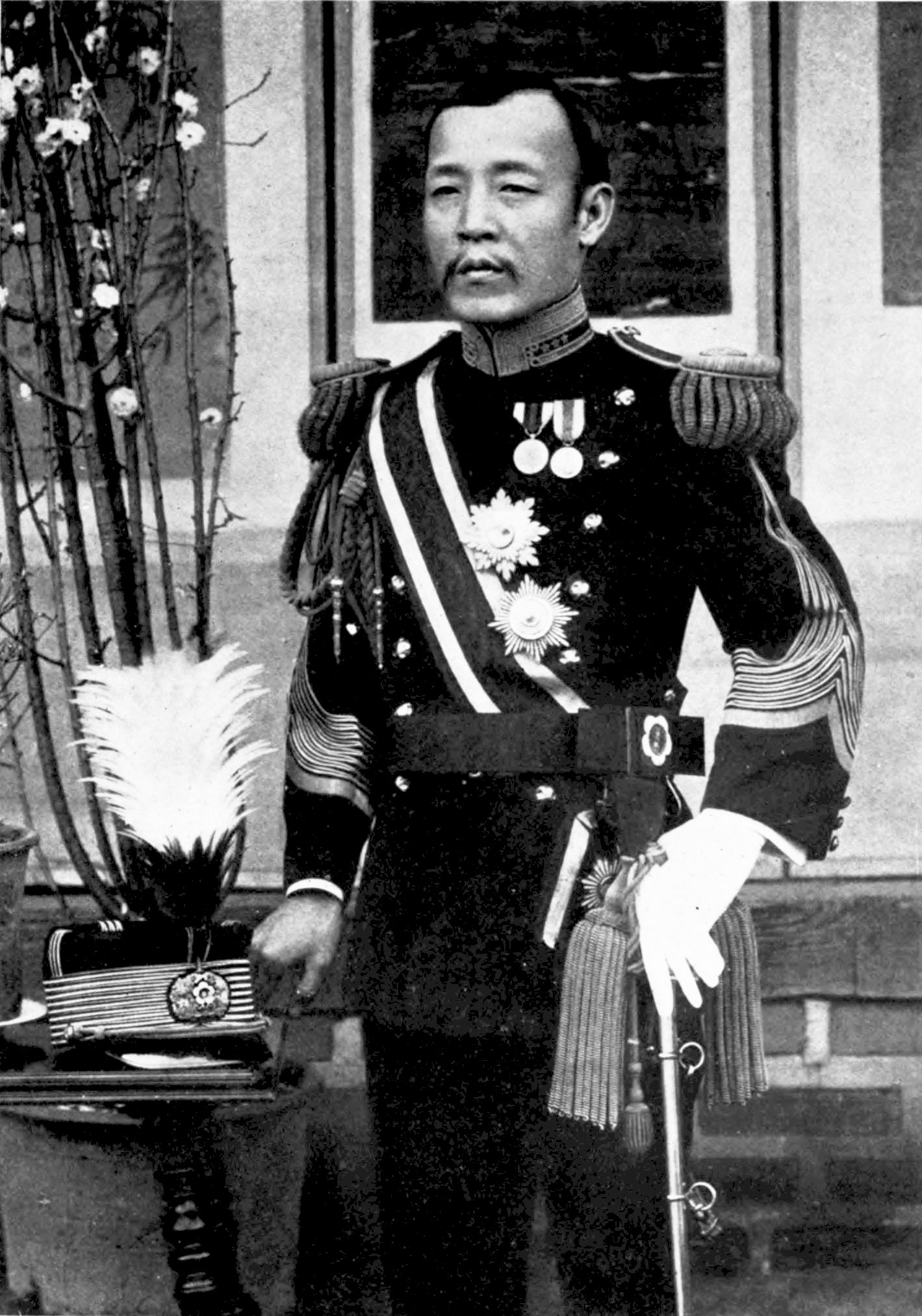
Premier Min

- General Min Young-hwan was appointed as the Prime Minister of the Korean Empire by Emperor Gojong, but was removed 12 days later on April 4. General Min was one of the last premiers of an independent Korea before the Eulsa Treaty of November 17, 1905, made Korea a protectorate of the Japanese Empire, and would commit suicide after the treaty was signed by his successor.

== March 27, 1905 (Monday) ==
- The Battle of Tabanovce was fought between the 27 guerrillas of the Serbian Chetnik Organization and much larger battalion of 112 members of the Ottoman Army at the village of Tabanovce, now part of the Republic of North Macedonia. The Chetniks, led by Vladimir Kovačević. The Ottomans and their Albanian allies lost more than half of their men, but Kovačević was killed in battle.

== March 28, 1905 (Tuesday) ==
- A federal grand jury returned a criminal indictment against the government of the U.S. city of Louisville, Kentucky for alleged violations of federal laws against forced labor.
- Died: Huang Zunxian, 57, Chinese poet and diplomat

== March 29, 1905 (Wednesday) ==
- U.S. President Roosevelt fired all seven members of the Isthmian Canal Commission, including the U.S. Governor of the Panama Canal Zone, Major General George W. Davis.
- Boxer Jimmy Walsh knocked out Monte Attell, in a controversial six-round bout at the National Athletic Club in Philadelphia to win recognition of the World Bantamweight Championship by the National Boxing Association, despite being disqualified by the referee.

== March 30, 1905 (Thursday) ==
- U.S. Navy Rear Admiral Charles J. Train was appointed as the new commander-in-chief of the United States Asiatic Fleet, but his career would be marred in November when he accidentally shot and injured a Chinese woman while hunting pheasants near Nanjing. Admiral Train would die of uremia 16 months later while in China.
- Born:
  - Mikio Oda, Japanese athlete and the first Asian Olympic gold medalist, for the men's triple jump in 1928; in Kaita, Hiroshima Prefecture (d. 1998)
  - Albert Pierrepoint, English hangman who carried out the executions of at least 435 convicted prisoners between 1941 and 1956; in Clayton, West Yorkshire (d. 1992)

== March 31, 1905 (Friday) ==
- Wilhelm II, German Emperor asserted German equality with France in Morocco, triggering the First Moroccan Crisis, also known as the Tangier Crisis.

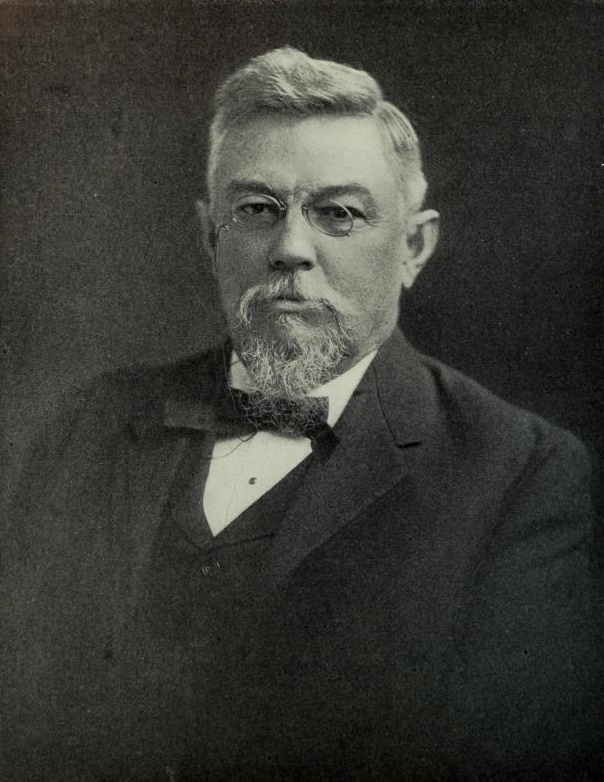
Governor Pennypacker

- Pennsylvania Governor Samuel W. Pennypacker vetoed the first attempt to pass a compulsory sterilization law in the United States as part of a program of eugenics, "An act for the prevention of idiocy", authorizing mental institutions the perform surgery "for the prevention of procreation.". Pennypacker was severe in his criticism of the bill, stating in his veto message, "It is plain that the safest and most effective method of preventing procreation would be to cut the heads off the inmates, and such authority is given by the bill to this staff of scientific experts. It is not probable that they would resort to this means for the prevention of procreation, but it is probable that they would endeavor to destroy some part of the human organism. He added that "Men of high scientific attainments are prone in their love for technique to lose sight of broad principles outside of their domain of thought," and that the bill "violates the principles of ethics." The veto was not overridden. The U.S. state of Indiana would pass the first sterilization bill in 1907.
