= Stojan Koruba =

Vojvoda Stojan Koruba
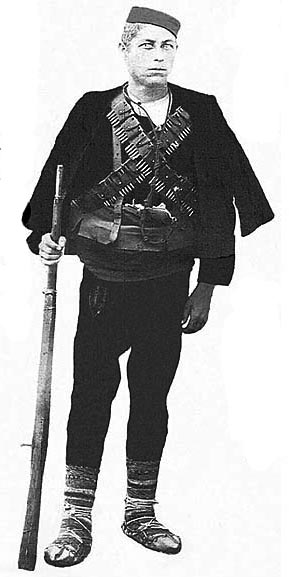
- Stojan Koruba in Chetnik gear.
- Born: Stojan Simonović; 1872; Šaprance, Ottoman Empire (now Serbia)
- Died: 1937 (aged 65); Vranjska Banja, Kingdom of Yugoslavia (now Serbia)
- Burial place: Vranjska Banja
- Military career
- Allegiance: Kingdom of Serbia; Serbian Chetnik Organization
- Service years: 1904–18
- Nicknames: Koruba or Korupče ("manger, trough"); Lisica ("fox")

Stojan Simonović (Serbian Cyrillic: Стојан Симоновић, 1872–1937), known by his nom de guerre Koruba (Коруба), was a Serbian Chetnik.

== Early life ==
Simonović was born into a poor family in Šaprance, at the time part of the Ottoman Empire. In 1878 the Preševo kaza, a frontier district on the Ottoman-Serbian border, was established, which included his village. He did not go to school, and worked as a shepherd. When he got older, the guerilla movement began in the region.

== Serbian Chetnik Organization ==
Stojan crossed the border in night-time and entered the frontier villages, and went to the Monastery of St. Panteleimon in Lepčince where he contacted the Central Board of Vranje, then swore oath. He was initially a jatak, helper, and was entrusted with delivering important letters, then escorted bands in groups of ten across the border into the Preševo kaza and also into Macedonia, none of which died. His knowledge of geography made him a pillar of the organization, and he also delivered armament and participated in many events and fights against Ottoman askeri, cavalry and frontier soldiers.

The Chetnik band heading for Poreč, numbering 27 men, descended at dawn on March 27 into the village of Tabanovce. They carried a load of 101 rifles and 30,000 rounds of ammunition. It was commanded by sergeant Vladimir Kovačević, the vojvoda, and the nephew of Herzegovinian revolutionary Stojan Kovačević. The band included, among others, sergeant Veselin Veselinović, lieutenant Dragomir Protić (Kovačević's deputy), sublieutenant Dragomir Vasiljević, Koruba, and Stojan Ristić-Giljanac. The unit's most experienced were Veselinović, Koruba, and Giljanac. Immediately upon arriving, Kovačević divided the band, sending a group of six under Veselinović to a house at the opposite end of the village, while the others were placed in two neighboring houses. A Turkish informant saw Veselinović's group and informed the Kumanovo garrison, who already in the early afternoon began searching the houses. Vasiljević was seriously wounded, while Vitko Vranjanac was shot dead; Stojan promptly reacted and ran through the yard, killing two soldiers, then took Vasiljević to safety. The Askeri surrounded Veselinović's house, and reformed Ottoman officer Turić informed the besieged that they had been abandoned by their comrades, who had fled before the army, and that he guaranteed them their lives if they surrendered; as resistance in these circumstances would be futile, they surrendered. Around 15:00 Kovačević's groups and the Ottoman army clashed. Protić and Vasiljević were killed right away when they attempted to break out. The Chetniks fought bravely and stopped the onslaught, which lasted until late at night, with the army retreating; the Ottomans most often avoided nightly engagements with the guerillas. The Ottomans had c. 60 dead and wounded, while the Chetniks had 11 dead and two lightly wounded.

The most notable commanders appreciated the boldness, resourcefulness, lively intelligence, mental and physical stamina of Stojan Koruba. When he appeared, the Chief of the Head Staff, the supreme commander, would stand and walk with him. He became respected in the Preševo kaza, especially in the Pčinja region. The Ottoman frontier units organized many ambushes and pursuits, but he always managed to escape. However, he once fell into the trap; crossing the border from Serbia with an important letter from the Executive Board for the Chief of all Chetniks in the Ottoman Empire, he descended through the Pčinja valley and disguised himself in a watermill, then went home to see his family. He had no idea that the Askeri organized a major ambush in the form of a semicircle. He immediately dropped to the ground and swallowed the letter, unseen to the soldiers, who then stripped and beat him with sticks. In a pool of blood, he saw his house set on fire, and heard the cries of his wife and father, and was then taken to prison in Skopje. They did not find the golden coins which he had hid; he bribed the guards and escaped. Arriving at Šaprance, his family was alive, and he took them across the border to Vranjska Banja. He then re-joined the Chetniks, who henceforth nicknamed him "the Fox" (Lisica).

Since 1911 he lived with his family in Vranjska Banja, where he received wages and land.

== Balkan Wars and World War I ==
In 1912, with Serbian soldiers and Chetniks, he participated in breaking the Ottoman border post on the Staračka Kula, and descending into Pčinja and the Monastery of Prohor Pčinjski. From there, he went to the Battle of Kumanovo where he distinguished himself. In World War I he crossed Albania and across Greece and the Salonica front, Vardar valley and Morava valley, in the offensive that liberated Serb lands. He died in 1937 and was buried in Vranjska Banja. His son Vlada, a teacher, had two daughters who married and moved from Vranjska Banja.

== Legacy ==
Stojan Koruba was regarded to have been the most skillful and daring of the Chetnik escorts during the organization's eight years of operations. Milosav Jelić wrote a poem about him, in the work Srbijanski venac (1919).

== Sources ==
- Đorđević, D. (2014-12-27). "Lisica među vojvodama" (in Serbian). Vesti Online. Archived from the original on 2017-02-02.
- Антонијевић, Синиша (2013-12-16). "Стара Србока моли за помоћ" (in Serbian). Vranje: Vranjske.
- Антонијевић, Синиша (2013-12-15). "Задојен српским предањима" (in Serbian). Vranje: Vranjske.
- Антонијевић, Синиша (2014). "КОРУБА - СЛОБОДА ИЛИ СМРТ - СПОМЕНИЦА". Vranje: Vranjske.
- Антонијевић, Синиша (2014-01-14). "Вучији синови Пчиње" (in Serbian). Vranje: Vranjske.
- Krakov, Stanislav (1990) [1930]. Plamen četništva (in Serbian). Belgrade: Hipnos.
- Narodni muzej u Vranju (1992). Vranjski glasnik. Vol. 24–28. Narodni muzej u Vranju. p. 177. "Стојан Симоновић Коруба (1872 — 1937)"
- Trifunović, Ilija Ž. (1933). Trnovitim stazama. Belgrade: GSSZZ. pp. 42–50.
- Љубисављевић, Мих. (1937). "Смрт Стојана Корубе, старог народног борца". Београд: Политика.
