= Battle of Tabanovce =

1905 battle of the Macedonian Struggle

- Part of the Macedonian Struggle
Date	27 March 1905
Location	Tabanovce, Ottoman Empire (modern North Macedonia) 42.214722°N 21.708333°E
Result	Ottoman retreat

Belligerents
Serbian Chetnik Organization	Ottoman Empire Kumanovo garrison

Commanders and leaders
Vladimir Kovačević	(Ottoman Empire) Turić

Strength
27	112

Casualties and losses
11 dead and two lightly wounded	c. 60 dead and wounded
- Location of Tabanovce in North Macedonia

The Battle of Tabanovce (Serbian: Borba na Tabanovcu, Serbian Cyrillic: Борба на Табановцу) was fought between the Serbian Chetnik Organization, a Serbian rebel faction, and an Ottoman garrison from Kumanovo. It took place on 27 March 1905.

== Battle ==
The Chetnik band heading for Poreče, numbering 27 men, descended at dawn on 27 March (O.S. 14 March) into the village of Tabanovce. They carried a load of 101 rifles and 30,000 rounds of ammunition. It was commanded by sergeant Vladimir Kovačević, a nephew of Herzegovinian revolutionary Stojan Kovačević. The band included, among others, sergeant Veselin Veselinović, lieutenant Dragomir Protić (Kovačević's deputy), sublieutenant Dragomir Vasiljević, Stojan Koruba, and Stojan Ristić-Giljanče. The unit's most experienced fighters were Veselin Veselinović, Stojan Koruba, and Stojan Ristić-Giljanče. Immediately upon arriving, Kovačević divided the band, sending a group of six under Veselinović to a house at the opposite end of the village, while the others were placed in two neighboring houses. A Turkish informant saw Veselinović's group and informed the Kumanovo garrison, who already in the early afternoon began searching the houses. Vasiljević was seriously wounded, while Vitko Vranjanac was shot dead; Stojan promptly reacted and ran through the yard, killing two soldiers, then took Vasiljević to safety. The askeri surrounded Veselinović's house, and reformed Ottoman officer Turić informed the besieged that they had been abandoned by their comrades, who had fled before the army, and that he guaranteed them their lives if they surrendered; as resistance in these circumstances would be futile, they surrendered. Around 15:00 Kovačević's groups and the Ottoman army clashed. Protić and Vasiljević were killed right away when they attempted to break out. The battle lasted until late at night, with the Ottoman army eventually retreating as they typically avoided nightly engagements with the guerillas. The Ottomans had c. 60 dead and wounded, while the Chetniks had 11 dead and two lightly wounded. Only one man managed to escape the encirclement -- Stojan Koruba.

== Aftermath ==
After the fights in Tabanovce, Savatije Milošević, Lazar Kujundžić and Aksentije Bacetović–Baceta left their offices as organizers of the action, wanting to feel the Chetnik lifestyle "from within" as voivodes. Baceta was to replace the then Chief of Upper Staff, Ilija Jovanović. Baceta and Savatije, by mid-April, had moved 107 fighters across the border.

== Sources ==
- Đorđević, D. (27 December 2014). "Lisica među vojvodama" (in Serbian). Vesti Online. Archived from the original on 2 February 2017.
