= Vladimir Kovačević =

Vladimir Kovačević may refer to:

- Vladimir Kovačević (military officer) (born 1961), Montenegrin Serb military officer charged with violation of the laws of war
- Vladica Kovačević (Vladimir Kovačević, 1940–2016), Serbian footballer
- Vladimir Kovačević (footballer, born 1992), Serbian footballer
- Vlatko Kovačević (Vladimir Kovačević, born 1942), Croatian and Yugoslavian chess grandmaster
- Vladimir Kovačević (Chetnik) (1871–1905)
