= Vojvoda Dragomir =

Serbian military leader

Dragomir Protić
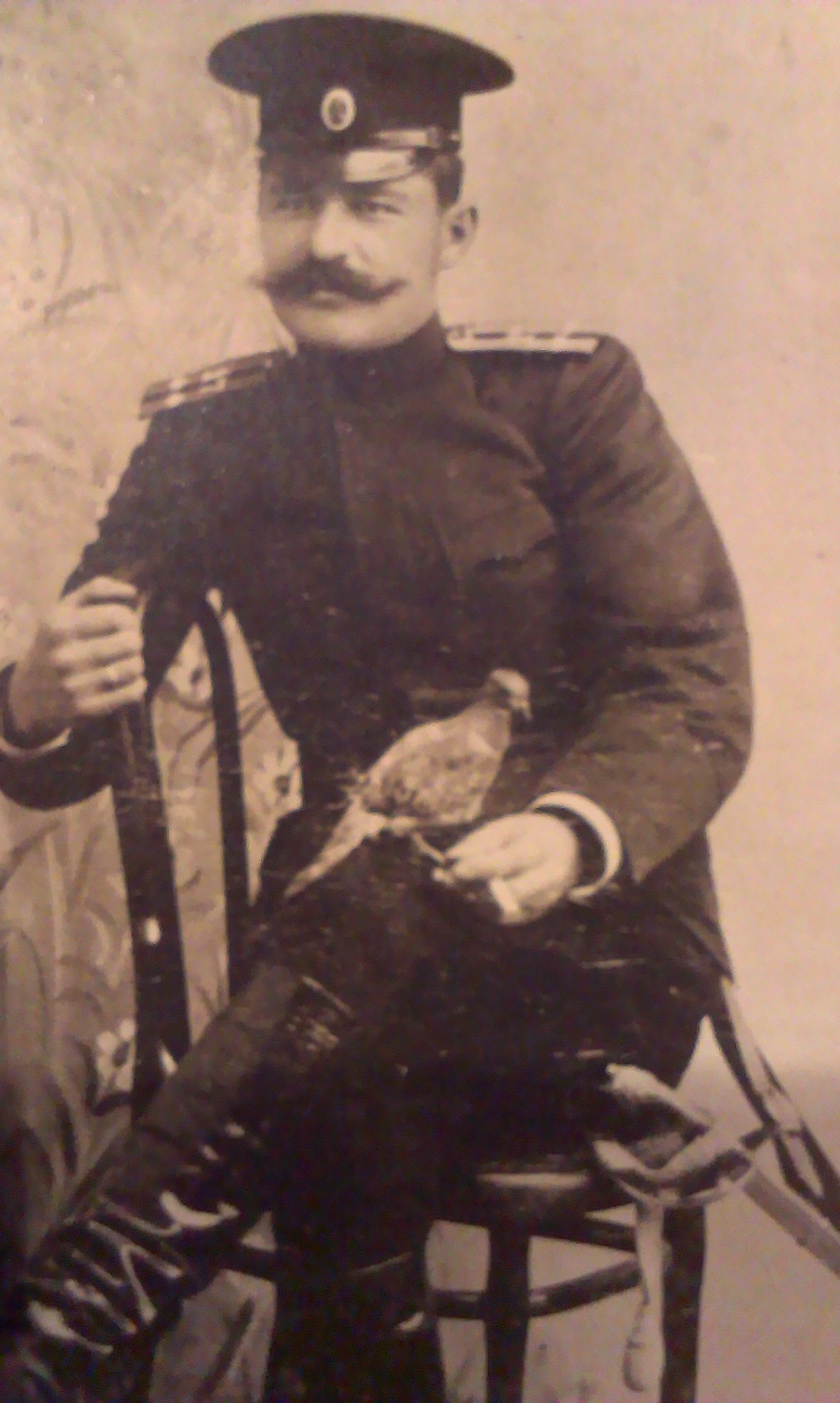
- Born: 1877; Užice, Serbia
- Died: 27 March 1905; Tabanovce, Ottoman Empire

Dragomir Protić or Vojvoda Dragomir (Užice, Serbia, 1877 – Tabanovce, Ottoman Empire, 27 March 1905) was a Serbian voivoda (military leader) who fought in the struggle to liberate Old Serbia and Macedonia from the Turkish yoke. He was killed at the Battle of Tabanovce in 1905 along with all of his men, including the commander of the cheta Vladimir Kovačević.

== Biography ==
Dragomir Protić was born in Užice in 1877. He studied in Osečina and in Šabac. He graduated from the Military Academy in Belgrade. In the spring of 1905, Lieutenant Protić, along with several non-commissioned officers, was given the task to join up with the troop headed by Vladimir Kovačević and breakthrough to Poreč to reinforce the Mountain Headquarters with officers' cadre. The aim was to arm Skopska Crna Gora's base for operations in the Upper Vardar River Basin.

Protić's task included the transfer of a large number of rifles and ammunition to Poreč. After the descent from Kozjak mountain, Protić and his 22 Chetniks were attacked by a unit of the Turkish army near the village of Tabanovce. The next day, Protić and 10 of his men lay dead and two slightly wounded. The Turks lost 60 soldiers in the fight, either dead or wounded.

A street in Belgrade, on Vračar, was named after him.

== See also ==
- Battle of Tabanovce
- Dejan Popović Jekić
