= Živojin Milovanović =

Žika Milovanović
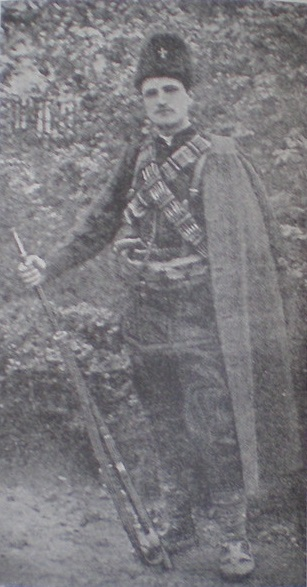
- Žika Milovanović
- Born: January 23, 1884; Kruševac, Kingdom of Serbia (now Serbia)
- Died: May 25, 1905 (aged 21); Velika Hoča, Ottoman Empire (now Kosovo)
- Military career
- Allegiance: Serbian Chetnik Organization (1903–05)
- Service years: 1903–05
- Rank: infantry lieutenant (Serbian Army) vojvoda (duke)
- Nickname: "Žika"

Živojin Milovanović (Serbian Cyrillic: Живојин Миловановић; January 23, 1884 — May 25, 1905), known by his nickname Žika, was a Serbian soldier, member of the Serbian revolutionary Chetnik Organization that fought in Old Serbia and Macedonia (see Macedonian Struggle).

== Life ==
Milovanović was born on January 23, 1884, in Kruševac, in the Kingdom of Serbia (now Serbia). He completed six grades of gymnasium in Kruševac, then finished the 33rd class of the Military Academy in Belgrade in 1903, with the rank of infantry lieutenant. He subsequently joined the Serbian Chetnik Organization, and in 1905, crossed the Serbian-Ottoman border into Old Serbia with a company. He participated in the famous battle at Čelopek (April 1905). Together with Lazar Kujundžić and Savatije Milošević he turned and went for Poreče, through Kosovo and Podgora, in order to bypass Ottoman harassing in the Kumanovo region. Milovanović, as a Serbian officer, was to establish the headquarters of Western Povardarje. The company was betrayed in Velika Hoča on May 25, 1905, by local Albanians who had promised (see besa) their security, thus they were forced to battle the Ottoman Army and neighbouring Albanian kachaks. After a long fight, all of these Chetniks died.

== See also ==
- List of Chetnik voivodes

== Sources ==
- M. Rakić, Konzulska pisma, 1905–1911, Beograd 1985, priredio A. Mitrović, br. 2, 3, 4, 6
- P. Kostić, 'Pogibija naših četnika u Velikoj Hoči', Južni pregled 6–7, Beograd 1930, 272-276
- G. Božović, Savatije i Kolašin, Južni pregled 6–7, Beograd 1930, 278–283.
- Voja Stojanović- Boke (1941). Zaslužni sinovi: biografije zaslužnih ljudi sa teritorije Istočne Srbije i Pomoravlja. Štamparija "Minerva". p. 82.
