= Vladimir Kovačević (Chetnik) =

Vladimir Kovačević (Serbian Cyrillic: Владимир Ковачевић; 1871-1905) was a Serbian voivode during the fight to end Ottoman Empire control of Old Serbia and Macedonia. Kovačević was involved in the Fight in Tabanovce against an enemy force that outnumbered his significantly.

A Serbian Cheta in Poreč, with a strength of 27 men, descended at dawn of 27 March 1905 in the village of Tabanovce. The squad carried a load of 101 rifles and 30,000 rounds of ammunition. The leader was Vladimir Kovačević. At about 3 o'clock in the afternoon, Kovačević's group was ambushed by Turkish troops. From the start of the conflict lieutenant Dragomir Protić was killed along with another fighter (sub-lieutenant Dragomir Vasiljević) while attempting to break out from the Turkish encirclement. Vladimir Kovačević fought bravely throughout the skirmish with the Ottoman Turks. He showed his heroism by throwing several hand grenades at the Turks and their Albanian auxiliaries forcing them to withdraw from the area before nightfall. Turks always avoided entanglements with Serbian Chetas at night. The next day when fighting resumed there but a few Serbs holding their positions until all were decimated, including Vladimir Kovačević. He is commemorated in the Government calendar of the Kingdom of Serbia (Drzavni kalendar Kraljevine Srbije) in 1911. Only one member of the cheta -- Stojan Koruba—managed to extricate himself from the fighting and survive.

== See also ==
- List of Chetnik voivodes
