= April 1905 =

Month of 1905

<<	April 1905					>>
Su	Mo	Tu	We	Th	Fr	Sa
						1
2	3	4	5	6	7	8
9	10	11	12	13	14	15
16	17	18	19	20	21	22
23	24	25	26	27	28	29
30

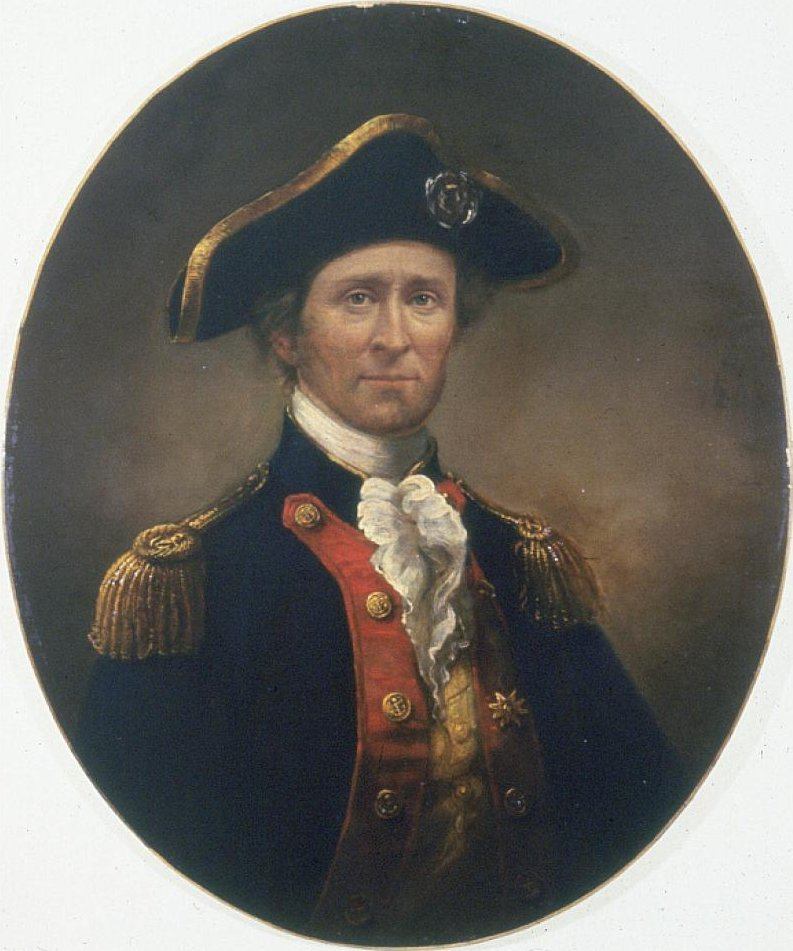
April 5, 1905: Body of John Paul Jones located in Paris almost 113 years after his death

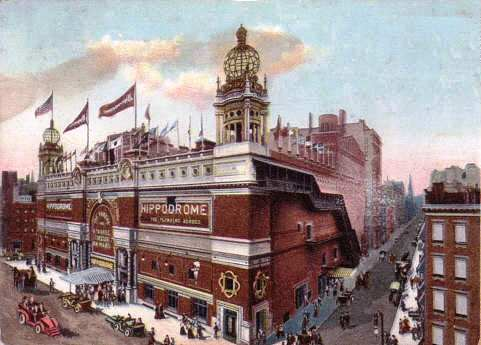
April 12, 1905: The Hippodrome, world's largest theater, opens in New York City with 5,000 seats

The following events occurred in April 1905:

== April 1, 1905 (Saturday) ==
- The British Imperial Penny Post was extended to include Australia.
- Born:
  - Gaston Eyskens, Prime Minister of Belgium, 1949-1950, 1958-1961, 1968-1973; in Lier (d. 1988)
  - Paul Hasluck, Governor-General of Australia, 1969-1974; in Freemantle, Western Australia (d. 1993)

== April 2, 1905 (Sunday) ==
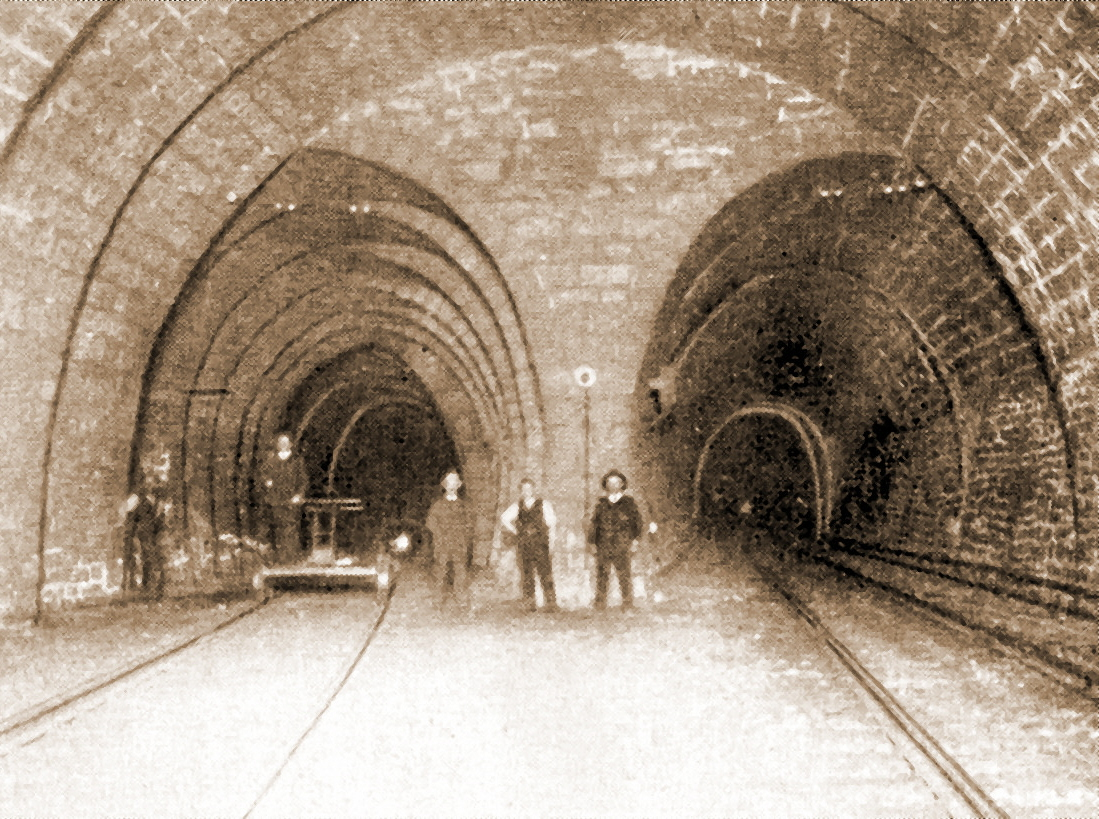
Inside the Simplon Tunnel

- The Simplon Tunnel through the Alps was opened to railway traffic.
- The government of Chile, having recently enlarged its territory by the settlement of its boundary dispute with Bolivia, announced that it wanted to acquire sovereignty over two provinces in Peru, Tacna and Arica.

== April 3, 1905 (Monday) ==
- A coal mine explosion at Zeigler, Illinois, killed 50 miners.
- U.S. President Theodore Roosevelt appointed Charles E. Magoon as the new Governor of the Canal Zone as he replaced all seven members of the Panama Canal Commission.
- The Boca Juniors football club was founded in Buenos Aires, Argentina
- Hal Reid's The Gypsy Girl opened on Broadway at the Star Theatre, with a young Mary Pickford as the boy Freckles.

== April 4, 1905 (Tuesday) ==
- In India, the 1905 Kangra earthquake hit the Kangra Valley, killed 20,000 and destroyed most buildings in Kangra, McLeod Ganj and Dharamshala.
- Born: Tony Manero, American pro golfer and 1936 U.S. Open winner; in New York City (d. 1989)
- Died:
  - Alphonse Favier, 67, French Roman Catholic priest and missionary to the Chinese Empire who protected thousands of Chinese Christians during the Boxer Rebellion
  - Constantin Meunier, 73, Belgian sculptor and modern artist known for his artwork featuring the workingman, including Monument to Labor

== April 5, 1905 (Wednesday) ==
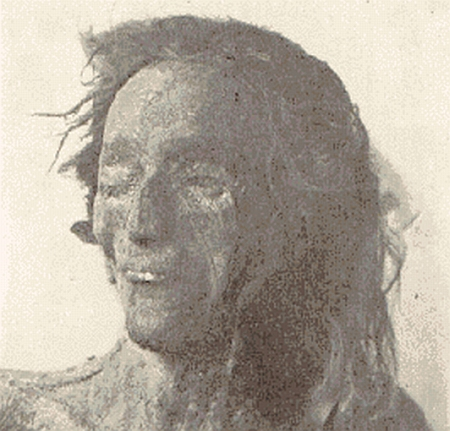
Jones's body after being exhumed

- The body of John Paul Jones, the Revolutionary War hero who was known as "The Father of the American Navy", was located in Paris almost 113 years after his death after a six-year search by U.S. Ambassador to France Horace Porter. On April 20, the casket was located on April 5, and taken to the American Church of the Holy Trinity in Paris "where his coffin rested beneath a draped American flag to await its return to a grateful nation." and the remains were returned to the United States, where they now rest at the U.S. Naval Academy in Annapolis, Maryland.
- Electric streetcar transportation was introduced to the Philippines as the Tranvia system replaced horse-drawn trolleys in Manila.

== April 6, 1905 (Thursday) ==
- A violent strike by the Teamsters' Union began in Chicago as the 10,000 members of the local United Brotherhood of Teamsters walked off the job to join 5,000 members of the 26 locals of the National Tailors' Association. After the Teamsters entered, rioting began on April 7 and would continue through August 1. Before the strike was settled, 21 people had been killed and 416 injured in what was the most deadly labor dispute in 20th century up to that time; it remains second only to the East St. Louis Riot of 1917.

== April 7, 1905 (Friday) ==
- In San Antonio, Texas, U.S. President Roosevelt attended the first reunion since 1898 of the Rough Riders.
- Died: Sister Maria Assunta Pallotta, 26, Italian Roman Catholic nun who set up a charitable mission to China, died of typhus.

== April 8, 1905 (Saturday) ==
- Hundreds of people were killed in Spain in the collapse of a dam holding back a reservoir near Madrid.
- Died: Sarah E. Goode, 49, the second African-American woman to receive a U.S. patent, in 1885 for her invention of a folding bed

== April 9, 1905 (Sunday) ==
- The Swedish Civil Administration's Employees' Union (Civilförvaltningens Personalförbund), the first labor union for government employees and civil servants in Sweden, was founded under the name "State Caretakers' Association" (Statens vaktmästares förening), with 242 members. By 1969, it would have over 9,000; in 1970, the Swedish National Union of State Employees (Statsanställdas förbund) would be created and absorb the private union.
- Born: J. William Fulbright, U.S. Senator for Arkansas 1945-1974 and longtime Chairman of the Foreign Relations Commission, later the creator of the Fulbright scholarship; in Sumner, Missouri (d. 1995)
- Died:
  - Sarah Chauncey Woolsey, 70, American children's author who wrote under the pen name Susan Coolidge
  - Frederic Thesiger, 2nd Baron Chelmsford, 77, British Army General who commanded forces in the Zulu War of 1879

== April 10, 1905 (Monday) ==
- The last legal executions in China by the practice of Lingchi, a method of slow torture called "death by a thousand cuts" because of the gradual severing of parts of the body, were carried out in Beijing on a condemned Mongol prisoner. "Fou-tchou-li", later referred to as Fuzhuli had been convicted of the murder of his master. Photographs were taken by French soldiers at the scene, leading to pressure on the Chinese government to abolish the penalty entirely.
- The Ottoman Empire's governor of the Mutasarrifate of Jerusalem in Ottoman Palestine issued a decree allowing Chechen immigrants, who had fled persecution in the Russian Empire, to own lands that they had settled on, leading to the rapid growth of the city of Zarqa, now located in Jordan.

== April 11, 1905 (Tuesday) ==
- The Gibbes Museum of Art opened in Charleston, South Carolina.

== April 12, 1905 (Wednesday) ==
- The New York Hippodrome, at the time the world's largest theater with 5,300 seats, had its grand opening with an extravagant show called A Yankee Circus on Mars, followed by the drama Andersonville. The theater would be closed on August 16, 1939, to be demolished in order for the real estate to be sold for more than the building was worth.
- The Diatto-Clément automobile company was founded in Italy as part of a partnership between the railway car manufacturer Diatto and the French carmaker Clément-Bayard.
- The cities of Twin Falls, Idaho, and Alachua, Florida were incorporated.

== April 13, 1905 (Thursday) ==
- Albert Libertad first published the journal L'Anarchie to promote the cause of individual anarchism in France. The journal lasted until the outbreak of World War One in August 1914, with the final issue published on July 22, 1914.
- Died: H. T. Craven, 87, English actor and playwright

== April 14, 1905 (Friday) ==
- Erik Gustaf Boström resigned as Prime Minister of Sweden over the issue of the Swedish-Norwegian Union. His Minister without Portfolio, Johan Ramstedt, succeeded him.

== April 15, 1905 (Saturday) ==
- The FA Cup was won by Aston Villa over Newcastle United, 2 to 0, before a crowd of 101,117 people at the Crystal Palace stadium in South London.
- The Norddeutscher Fußball-Verband (NFV), one of the earliest national soccer football leagues in Germany, was formed by the agreement of six regional associations (based in Hamburg, Bremen, Kiel, Hannover, Braunschweig and Mecklenburg) from eight different German kingdoms, principalities and duchies.

== April 16, 1905 (Sunday) ==
- The Battle of Čelopek was fought in the Ottoman Empire (in what is now the Republic of North Macedonia) as a force of 130 Serbian Chetnik fighters killed an entire column of 200 Ottoman Army soldiers and officers, while losing only four of its own men.

== April 17, 1905 (Monday) ==
- Russia's Tsar Nicholas II issued a decree granting religious freedom to his subjects allowing believers outside the Russian Orthodox Church (including Roman Catholics and Muslim) to minister to Russians.
- In the case of Lochner v. New York, the Supreme Court of the United States invalidated New York's 8-hour-day law in a 5 to 4 decision.

== April 18, 1905 (Tuesday) ==
- Real Madrid won its first soccer football title ever, Spain's third Copa del Rey, by defeating Athletic Bilbao, 1 to 0 after having beaten the (now defunct) San Sebastián Recreation Club two days earlier.
- Born: George H. Hitchings, American physician, pharmacologist and 1988 Nobel Prize laureate for his work on chemotherapy for treatment of cancer; in Hoquiam, Washington (d. 1998)
- Died: Juan Valera y Alcalá-Galiano, 80, Spanish novelist and diplomat

== April 19, 1905 (Wednesday) ==
- The United Kingdom and the Republic of Nicaragua signed the Harrison-Altamirano Treaty, recognizing absolute Nicaraguan sovereignty over the Mosquito Coast. The new treaty annulled the 1860 Zeldon-Wyke Treaty that had preserved British authority on the Mosquito Indians reservation.

== April 20, 1905 (Thursday) ==
- The largest ocean liner in the world at the time, the German cruiser SS Amerika was launched from Ireland's Harland and Wolff shipyard in Belfast for the Hamburg America Line. It would go into service on October 11. After World War One, it was taken acquired by the United States Navy, which would rechristen it as USS America.

== April 21, 1905 (Friday) ==
- The deputies of the Assembly of the island of Crete voted to unite with Greece, and swore their allegiance to the Hellenic constitution. The government of Greece announced that it would not recognize the Cretan proclamation.
- Born: Pat Brown, Governor of California 1959-1967; in San Francisco(d. 1996)
- Died: Orville H. Platt, 82, U.S. Senator for Connecticut since 1879, known for the Platt Amendment providing terms for U.S. military withdrawal from, and eventual independence for, Cuba.

== April 22, 1905 (Saturday) ==
- Théophile Delcassé withdrew his resignation as Foreign Minister of France, the day after giving it, after a personal request by President Émile Loubet.

== April 23, 1905 (Sunday) ==
- German General Lothar von Trotha commander of troops in Germany's colony of Südwestafrika (now Namibia), ordered the extermination of the Nama people within the colony's borders, ultimately killing 10,000 of the Africans. Von Trotha's proclamation Aan de oorlogvorende Namastamme, proclaimed that "The Nama who chooses not to surrender and lets himself be seen in German territory will be shot, until all are exterminated." The Nama extermination followed an order by von Trotha on October 2, 1904, to kill the Ovaherero people in the colony.
- Died: Joe Jefferson, 76, American comedian and actor

== April 24, 1905 (Monday) ==
- China's Empress Regent Cixi (Tzu Hsi) abolished further use in executions of the nation's three most cruel torture execution methods, lingchi ("death by a thousand cuts"), gibbeting (similar to crucifixion, hanging until dying of exposure, thirst or starvation), and desecration of a dying person.

== April 25, 1905 (Tuesday) ==
- A revolt broke out in what is now Saudi Arabia against the authority of the Sultan of the Ottoman Empire as leader of the Islamic faith.
- Born: George Nēpia, New Zealand Maori rugby player; in Wairoa (d. 1986)

== April 26, 1905 (Wednesday) ==
- The government of the United States announced that it was abandoning its negotiations with the Chinese Empire for a treaty regarding Chinese immigration to the U.S.
- Born: Raúl Leoni, President of Venezuela 1964-1969; in El Manteco, Bolívar state (d. 1972)

== April 27, 1905 (Thursday) ==
- General Alexander Alexandrovich Kozloff was appointed as the new Governor-General of Moscow, replacing the recently assassinated Grand Duke Sergius.

== April 28, 1905 (Friday) ==
- A tornado struck Laredo, Texas and killed 16 people: nine in Laredo, seven in Nuevo Laredo.
- Herbert W. Bowen, the U.S. Ambassador to Venezuela, was removed from office the Department of State and directed to return to the U.S. to explain charges made against him by the Assistant U.S. Secretary of State Francis B. Loomis (who had been Bowen's predecessor as Ambassador). The State Department replaced with William W. Russell, the U.S. Ambassador to neighboring Colombia.

== April 29, 1905 (Saturday) ==
- Inventor John J. Montgomery made the first public demonstration of his "Montgomery Aeroplane", a glider that he released from a balloon at an altitude of 4,000 feet (1,200 m) above Santa Clara College in California, with Daniel J. Maloney as the pilot.
- The Imperial Russian Navy's submarine fleet, which had been on patrol since February 14, had its first combat in the Russo-Japanese War. An Imperial Japanese Navy torpedo boat fired upon the Russian submarine Som, but was unable to score a hit.
- Born: Sir George Beamish, Royal Air Force Air Marshal for the United Kingdom and former Ireland national rugby union team player; in Dunmanway, County Cork (d. 1967)
- Died: Lord Grimthorpe, 88, British architect and engineer

== April 30, 1905 (Sunday) ==
- Albert Einstein completed his doctoral dissertation, A New Determination of Molecular Dimensions (submitted July 30 to the University of Zurich).
- Born: Sergey Nikolsky, Russian mathematician; in Talitsa, Perm Governorate, Russian Empire (d. 2012)
