= Milosav Jelić =

Serbian journalist (1883–1947)

Milosav Jelić (Skobalj (Smederevo), Kingdom of Serbia, 13 March 1883 – Belgrade, Yugoslavia, 6 July 1947) was a Serbian chetnik active in Old Serbia and Macedonia. He was also a writer, war poet and one of the leading Belgrade journalists at the daily newspaper Politika before World War II.

== Biography ==
Born in Skobalj (Smederevo) to Serbian parents. After he graduated from the Belgrade gymnasium in 1903, he studied military history at the Military Academy in Belgrade. After he graduated, he joined the Serbian Chetnik Organization, participated in the Balkan Wars of 1912 and 1913 and the Great War. Later, he was assigned to a diplomatic legation. In the 1920s he joined the largest daily newspaper in Belgrade – Politika (Politics).

During the Macedonian struggle and the Fight in Velika Hoča in particular, Milosav Jelić, published the poem Kujundžića majka (Kujundžić's Mother) in the collection of Srbijanski venac (Serbian Garland), memorializing voivode Lazar Kujundžić. In the same book, he wrote a poem about Stojan Koruba. He also immortalized volunteer, Podnarednik (Lance sergeant) Mihajlo Jovanović for his acts of bravery at the height of World War I in 1917. That poem and many others garnered him a reputation as a war poet. He also co-wrote the lyrics for Stanislav Binički's popular composition – March on the Drina – with Miloje Popović.

== Works ==
- Letopis Juga: Listine: Zapisi: Dnevnik: Pomenik. Belgrade, 1930
- Srbijanski venac, Novi Sad, 1919, Belgrade, 1931
- Albanija: zapisi o ljudima i dogadjajima, Belgrade, 1933
- Knjiga Stihova, Belgrade, 1937

== See also ==
- List of Chetnik voivodes
- Radoje Pantić
