= Radoje Pantić =

Serbian major

- Born: 10 September 1880; Negotin, Serbia
- Died: 19 September 1916 (aged 36); Siva Stena, Kingdom of Serbia
- Occupation: military officer

Radoje Pantić (10 September 1880 - 19 September 1916) was a Serbian major who fought for the Macedonian Serb Chetniks and then served the national army in the Balkan Wars and during the Serbian Campaign (part of the larger Balkans Campaign) in World War I.

== Biography ==
He graduated from the Military Academy in Belgrade. From 1911 he was the supervising officer of the mountainous headquarters in the Raška border region, next to the Ottoman Empire. He was a liaison officer in touch with other commanders who were operating behind enemy lines. His task was to transfer arms and men across the border to Turkish territory. In August 1912, he joined the Black Hand.

He died at Siva Stena during the Battle of Kaymakchalan while commanding the 2nd Volunteer Battalion. The battle was fought between 12 and 30 September 1916, when the Serbian army managed to capture the peak of Prophet Ilija while pushing the Bulgarians towards the town of Mariovo. His courage was on display when he single-handedly charged a machinegun nest, receiving a bullet wound in the head. After receiving a second wound in the head, he fell unconscious, and as soon as he came to, Pantić urged his men to leave their cover and counterattack by yelling the famous words, "Go! We have to take the position even if we all have to die!" His men overpowered the enemy post and took the high ground.

After Major Pantić's untimely death, war poet Milosav Jelić immortalized him in a poem entitled, "Radoje Pantić", published in Srbianski venac.

Today Radoje Pantić is considered one of the heroes of World War I in Serbia.

== See also ==
- List of Chetnik voivodes
- Milosav Jelić
