= May 1905 =

Month of 1905

<<	May 1905					>>
Su	Mo	Tu	We	Th	Fr	Sa
	1	2	3	4	5	6
7	8	9	10	11	12	13
14	15	16	17	18	19	20
21	22	23	24	25	26	27
28	29	30	31

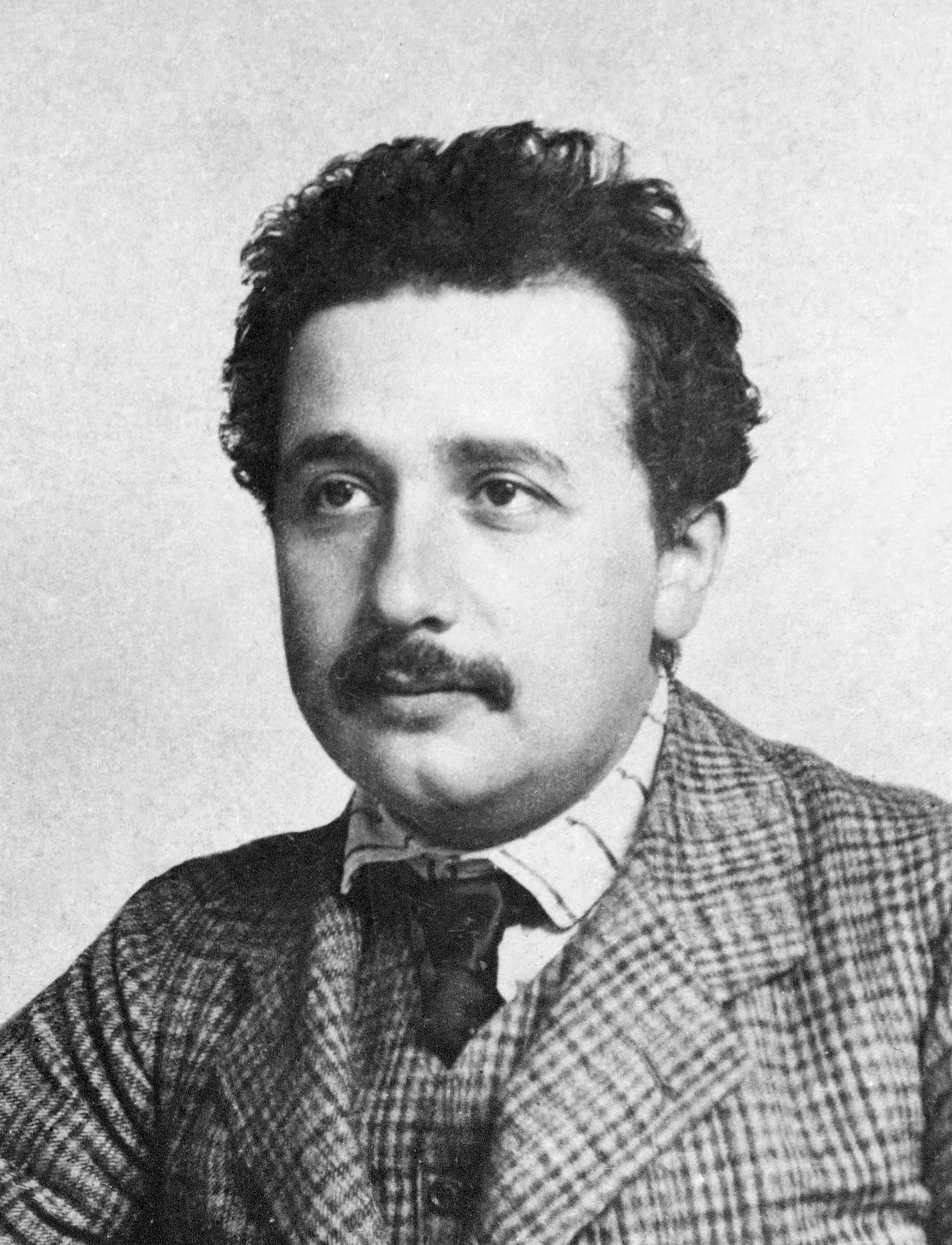
May 11, 1905: Former patent office worker Albert Einstein submits his first of four landmark papers of 1905

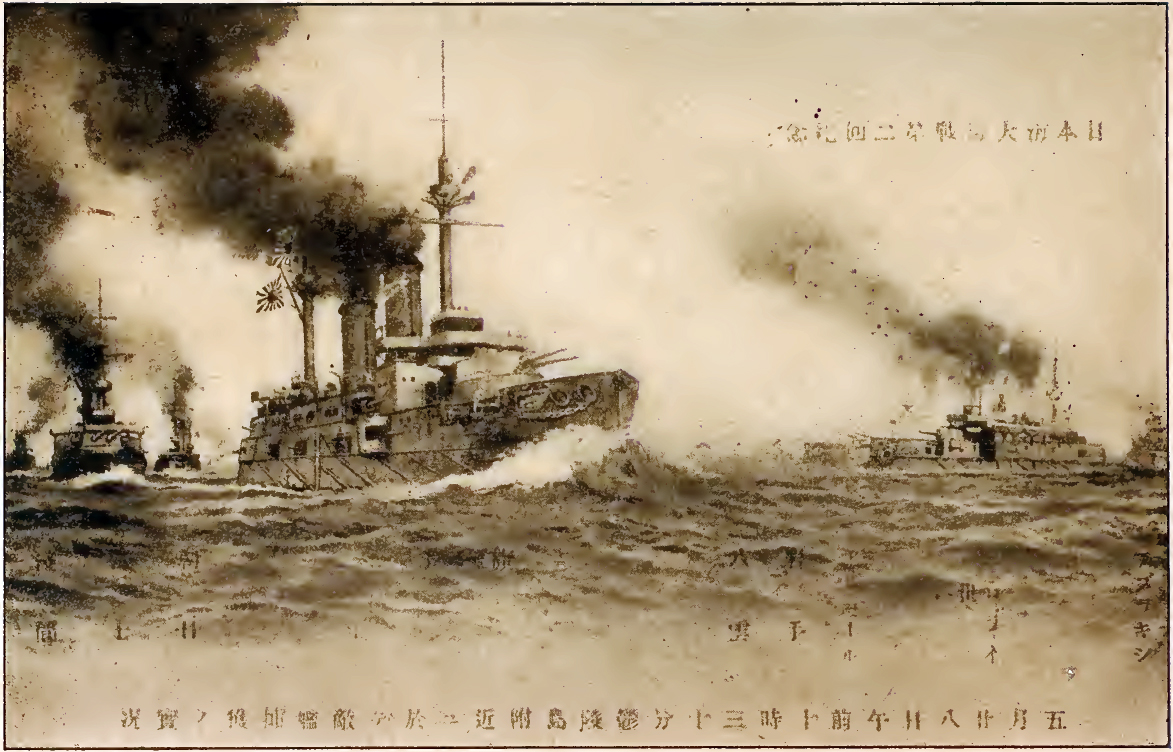
May 27–28, 1905: Japanese fleet destroys most of Russian Imperial Navy ships at the Battle of Tsushima

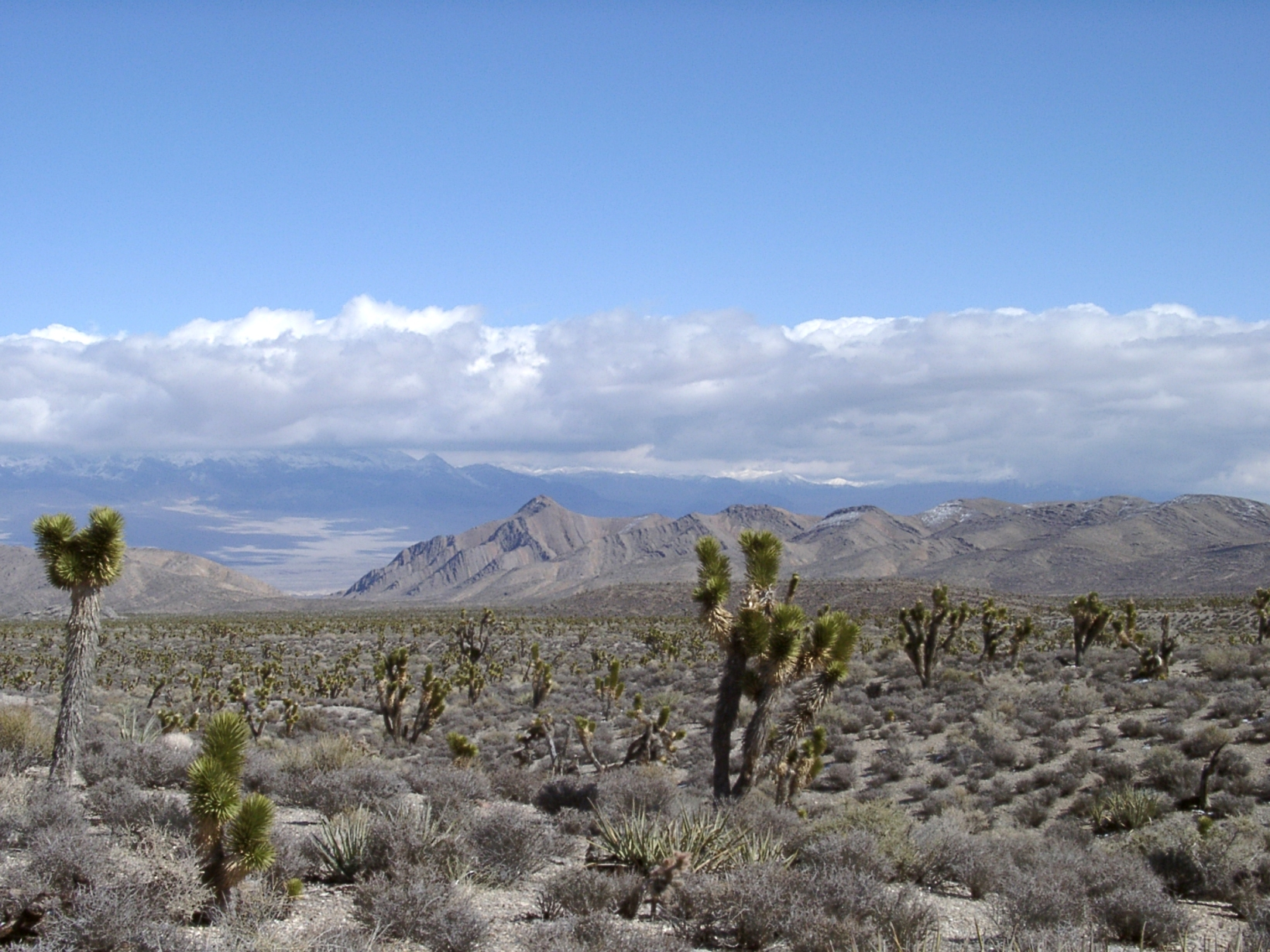
May 15, 1905: Las Vegas is founded with auction of 110 acres (0.45 km^{2}) of the Nevada desert

The following events occurred in May 1905:

== May 1, 1905 (Monday) ==
- As uprisings in Poland continued, Imperial Russian Army soldiers fired into crowds of protesters in Warsaw and in Łódź.

== May 2, 1905 (Tuesday) ==
- The Pennsylvania State Police (PSP) was founded by act of the state legislature, in response to the violence of the coal strike of 1902.
- In Notodden in Norway, the first mass production of synthetic potassium nitrate, using the Birkeland–Eyde process, was carried out.

== May 3, 1905 (Wednesday) ==
- Aleksandr Kuprin's novel The Duel was first published.
- Born: Werner Fenchel, German mathematician known for his convex analysis and nonlinear optimization theory which would later serve as the foundation for nonlinear programming; in Berlin (d. 1988)

== May 4, 1905 (Thursday) ==
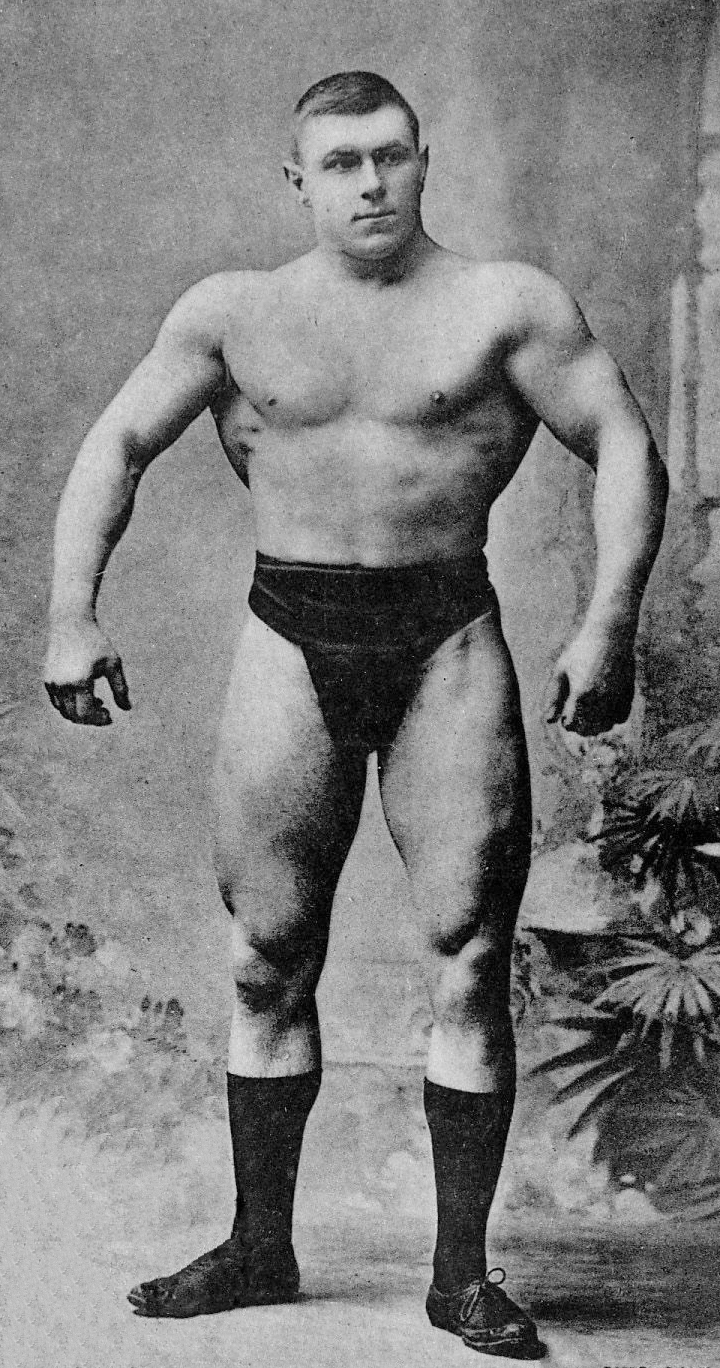
The first pro wrestling champion

- The first world championship of professional wrestling took place at Madison Square Garden in New York City, as Estonian-born strong man George Hackenschmidt defeated U.S. champion Tom Jenkins.
- New York's Belmont Park for horse racing was opened at the Long Island town of Elmont, initially to host the Belmont Stakes

== May 5, 1905 (Friday) ==
- Korea University was founded in Seoul as Bosung College.
- The city of Kelowna, British Columbia, was incorporated.
- Born: Floyd Gottfredson, American cartoonist, primarily known for the Mickey Mouse comic strip; in Kaysville, Utah (d. 1986)

== May 6, 1905 (Saturday) ==
- The Klamath National Forest was founded in California near the town of Yreka and now covers 2,715 square miles (7,030 km^{2}) of protected lands in the California and part of Oregon.

== May 7, 1905 (Sunday) ==
- The Japanese and Korean Exclusion League was launched in San Francisco in California by Americans of European descent, P. H. McCarthy of the San Francisco Building Trades Council labor union, and Andrew Furuseth of the International Seamen's Union to lobby to exclude further immigration to the U.S. from Asia.

== May 8, 1905 (Monday) ==
- The first immigrants to Mexico from Korea arrived on a British cargo ship and landed at the port of Salina Cruz after departing Incheon on April 4. The group, under contract to a plantation, boarded trains to the town of Progreso in the state of Yucatán, but most were not able to save enough money to go home.
- The case of United States v. Ju Toy was decided by the United States Supreme Court, determining that the decision of immigration authorities to deny a person entry into the U.S. was not subject to judicial review and that denial of entry was not a violation of due process.

== May 9, 1905 (Tuesday) ==
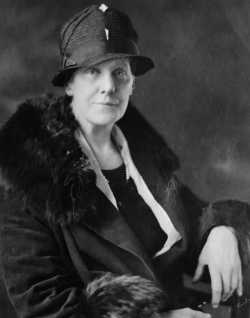
Jarvis

- Upon the death of U.S. social activist Ann Reeves Jarvis In West Virginia, her daughter Anna Jarvis resolved to campaign across the United States for a proposed "Mother's Day", lobbying successfully to get the state of West Virginia to recognize the second Sunday in May as the day for remembrance of mothers both living and dead. Miss Jarvis's campaign would be the inspiration for multiple celebratory days for family members during the year, and provide a new outlet for business for florists and sellers of greeting cards.
- Born: Lilí Álvarez, Spanish tennis player who appeared in the finals at Wimbledon in 1926, 1927, and 1928 and won the French Open mixed doubles in 1929; in Rome to Spanish parents (d. 1998)

== May 10, 1905 (Wednesday) ==
- In the U.S., A tornado destroyed the town of Snyder, Oklahoma and killed 97 people, making it the seventh deadliest storm in U.S. history up to that time.
- The Kentucky Derby was held, with only three horses. Agile, ridden by Jack Martin, won, while Ram's Horn placed and Layson showed.
- Died: Bernhard Samuelson, 84, British politician and engineer

== May 11, 1905 (Thursday) ==
- Albert Einstein submitted for publication the first of four groundbreaking papers in physics for 1905, Über die von der molekularkinetischen Theorie der Wärme geforderte Bewegung von in ruhenden Flüssigkeiten suspendierten Teilchen ("On the Motion of Small Particles Suspended in a Stationary Liquid, as Required by the Molecular Kinetic Theory of Heat"), based on his doctoral research, delineating a stochastic model of Brownian motion. The paper would be published on July 18.
- A dynamite explosion killed 20 passengers and three employees on a Pennsylvania Railroad train, the Cincinnati Express, after a freight train from the same company derailed at Harrisburg, Pennsylvania while carrying 50,000 pounds (23,000 kg) of the explosive.
- Born:
  - Lise de Baissac, Mauritian-born British Special Operations Executive (SOE) agent and war heroine; in Curepipe (d. 2004)
  - Catherine Bauer Wurster, American architect and public housing advocate, author of the influential book Modern Housing; in Elizabeth, New Jersey (killed in accidental fall, 1964)
- Died:
  - Andrzej Jerzy Mniszech, 81, Polish painter and art collector
  - Emerson Bennett, 83, American novelist and short story writer

== May 12, 1905 (Friday) ==
- The recently opened Natural History Museum in London unveiled its centerpiece, and exact replica of the skeleton of the Diplodocus carnegii dinosaur, made from plaster from the original fossilized bones that were still being prepared for display at the Carnegie Museum of Natural History in Pittsburgh. The press soon dubbed the diplodicus with the name "Dippy".
- Yi Han-eung, the Korean Empire's highest-ranking diplomatic representative as charge d'Affaires to the United Kingdom, hanged himself in his private residence in London, after the British Foreign Secretary had refused to meet with him regarding Japan's imminent takeover of Korea.

== May 13, 1905 (Saturday) ==
- The Nippon Club, the first traditional Japanese gentlemen's club in the United States, was founded in Manhattan in New York City by 75 prominent Japanese and Japanese-American business leaders, with renowned chemist Takamine Jōkichi as its first president.
- Born: Fakhruddin Ali Ahmed, President of India from 1974 until his death in 1977; in Delhi, British India (d. 1977)
- Died:
  - Sam S. Shubert, 26, American stage producer and theater operator, died two days after being injured in a railway accident
  - Hiram Cronk, 105, the last surviving veteran of the War of 1812

== May 14, 1905 (Sunday) ==
- Franz Roubaud's massive panorama painting The Siege of Sevastopol was unveiled to the public in the Russian city of Sevastopol in celebration of the 50th anniversary of the Crimean War siege that had ended in 1855. The full-size painting which is 377 feet (115 m) in length and 46 feet (14 m) high.
- Died: Jessie Bartlett Davis, 46, American opera contralto and state actress, died of Bright's disease, a kidney ailment

== May 15, 1905 (Monday) ==
- Las Vegas, Nevada, was founded when 110 acres (45 ha) of land adjacent to the Union Pacific Railroad tracks were auctioned to what is now today Downtown Las Vegas.
- Born: Joseph Cotten, American film and stage actor; in Petersburg, Virginia (d. 1994)
- Died: T. Brigham Bishop, 69, American songwriter who composed "John Brown's Body", "When Johnny Comes Marching Home", and "Shoo Fly, Don't Bother Me"

== May 16, 1905 (Tuesday) ==
- Nikolai Evgenievich Bogdanovich, the Russian Governor-General of the province of Ufa Governorate was shot and killed.
- Born: Henry Fonda, American film and stage actor, winner of a Tony Award (for Mister Roberts) and an Academy Award (for On Golden Pond); in Grand Island, Nebraska (d. 1982)

== May 17, 1905 (Wednesday) ==
- The Kappa Delta Rho fraternity was founded in Room 14 of Old Painter Hall, at Middlebury College in Middlebury, Vermont.

== May 18, 1905 (Thursday) ==
- Fighting broke out during a meeting of the Philadelphia city council after the council approved a 75-year lease to the United Gas Improvement Company of the city's natural gas plant to a private company, despite opposition from Mayor Weaver, for the amount of 25 million dollars, with exclusive control of the energy supply until the year 1980. Five days later, Mayor Weaver fired the Director of Public Works and the Director of Public Safety for negotiating the agreement, an action he was forced to rescind by a court injunction. On May 27, United Gas withdrew its proposition for the 75-year lease.

== May 19, 1905 (Friday) ==
- Harry George Galt, the much-despised British sub-commissioner of the Western Province of Uganda (at the time a British protectorate) was killed with a spear while resting in a government-owned house near the town of Ibanda.

== May 20, 1905 (Saturday) ==
- Burmah Oil acquired the "D'Arcy Concession", the exclusive right, until 1961, to prospect and drill for oil in the kingdom of Persia, now the Islamic Republic of Iran. William Knox D'Arcy had secured a 60-year option in 1901 for £20,000, but the project did not become feasible until the British government agreed to provide protection in the oil fields. The first oil strike would happen in 1908 for the Anglo-Persian Oil Company, owned by D'Arcy and Burmah Oil.
- Born: Gerrit Achterberg, Dutch poet; in Nederlangbroek (d. 1962)

== May 21, 1905 (Sunday) ==
- George Bernard Shaw's play Man and Superman premiered at the Royal Court Theatre in London as produced by the Stage Society. After the first two performances of the four-act play proved to be problematic, the play was performed from May 23 onward without Act III ("Don Juan in Hell").

== May 22, 1905 (Monday) ==
- Abdul Hamid II, the Sultan of the Ottoman Empire established the Ullah millet for the Aromanians of the empire. For this reason, the Aromanian National Day is sometimes celebrated on this day.
- Born: Tom Driberg, British politician who had been a member of the Communist Party of Great Britain before later becoming the Chairman of the Labour Party; in Crowborough, East Sussex (d. 1976)

== May 23, 1905 (Tuesday) ==
- Venezuelan President Cipriano Castro decreed an amnesty to all persons who had been exiled from Venezuela, and ordered the freedom of most political prisoners except for officers above the rank of colonel or navy captain.
- The Ottoman Sultan's decision to create the Ullah millet was publicly announced. This day is the most common date for the celebration of the Aromanian National Day.
- Died:
  - Ivan Kalyayev, 27, assassin of Grand Duke Sergei Alexandrovich of Russia, was hanged
  - Mary Livermore, 84, American journalist, abolitionist and women's rights activist
  - Paul Dubois, 75, French sculptor and portrait artist

== May 24, 1905 (Wednesday) ==
- Physicist and chemist Otto Hahn confirmed his discovery of a new element, "radiothorium", publishing his results in the journal Proceedings of the Royal Society.
- Born: Mikhail Sholokhov, Russian novelist known for And Quiet Flows the Don, recipient of the 1965 Nobel Prize in Literature; in Kruzhilin, Vyoshenskaya, Russian Empire (d. 1984)
- Died: Charles Henry Webb, 71, American humorist and poet, and editor for Mark Twain

== May 25, 1905 (Thursday) ==
- Ljubomir Stojanović formed a government as the new Prime Minister of Serbia, succeeding Nikola Pašić.
- The first meeting of the International Waterways Commission of the United States and Canada took place by agreement between the two nations to work together "to investigate and report upon the conditions and uses of the waters adjacent to the boundary lines... including all waters of the lakes and rivers whose natural outlet is by the St. Lawrence River to the Atlantic Ocean." The commission was composed of three members from the U.S., "and three who shall represent the interests of the Dominion of Canada."
- Died: William Ziegler, 61, American businessman known for his financing of several Arctic expeditions after founding the Royal Baking Powder Company

== May 26, 1905 (Friday) ==
- A newly completed drawbridge for the Pennsylvania Railroad, over the Hackensack River in New Jersey, was destroyed by dynamite.
- Died: Alphonse James de Rothschild, 78, French financier and philanthropist

== May 27, 1905 (Saturday) ==
- In the Russo-Japanese War, the decisive Battle of Tsushima began in the Straits of Korea, as the Japanese fleet under Admiral Heihachiro Togo staged a surprise attack on the Russian fleet under Admiral Zinovi Petrovich Rozhdestvenski.

== May 28, 1905 (Sunday) ==
- Japanese victory in the Battle of Tsushima, the only decisive battle fought between fleets of battleships; Russian personnel losses were 216 officers and 4,614 men killed; with 278 officers and 5,629 men taken as prisoners of war (POWs). Interned in neutral ports were 79 officers and 1,783 men. Escaping to Vladivostok and Diego-Suarez were 62 officers and 1,165 men. Eight battleships and three coastal battleships were either sunk, scuttled or captured. The Japanese lost three torpedo boats and 117 officers and men killed, with 583 officers and men wounded.
- Born: Sada Abe, Japanese Geisha, prostitute and convicted murderer; in Kanda, Tokyo(d. 1970)
- Died: F. Norton Goddard, 44, American anti-poverty activist, died of a brain hemorrhage

== May 29, 1905 (Monday) ==
- Brooklyn Superbas pitcher Elmer Stricklett introduced the "spitball" to major league baseball, according to one baseball historian, after learning the now-illegal technique while in the minor leagues. Eldon L. Ham would write later that Stricklett "unloaded an errant moistened missile that defied baseball physics. With a much nastier break than a normal big league curve, the spitter was born," and that after learning from a former teammate (George Hildebrand) how to use saliva to change the trajectory of a baseball, Stricklett "seems to have introduced the depraved missile at the Major League level."
- The first completely uncensored performance of Frank Wedekind's play Die Büchse der Pandora (Pandora's Box) premiered at the Trianon Theatre in Vienna, by invitation only, in order to avoid prosecution under anti-obscenity laws.
- The Widnes–Runcorn Transporter Bridge, the largest transporter bridge ever built, and the first in Britain, opened to the public. Persons crossing from one side of the bridge to the other boarded a large transporter car that had a capacity to carry up to 300 passengers or up to four horse-drawn wagons, and the transporter car would then travel on cables suspended from the underside of the 1,000 feet (300 m) bridge over the Mersey River.
- Born: Sebastian Shaw, English stage, film and television actor; in Holt, Norfolk (d. 1994)
- Died: Francisco Silvela, 61, Prime Minister of Spain 1902–1903

== May 30, 1905 (Tuesday) ==
- Two days after Japan's overwhelming victory at the Battle of Tsushima, Japan's Prime Minister Katsura Tarō sent a request, by way of the U.S. Embassy in Tokyo, to U.S. President Theodore Roosevelt asking him to bring together representatives of the Japanese and Russian empires to the U.S. as a neutral site for discussions to end the Russo-Japanese War. Within a week, Roosevelt would contact the Russians and peace discussions would take place at the U.S. Navy shipyard in Portsmouth, New Hampshire, starting on August 9, 1905.

== May 31, 1905 (Wednesday) ==
- In Paris, Spain's visiting King Alfonso and France's President Loubet escaped assassination after an anarchist threw a bomb at the carriage in which they were riding. The King and the President were returning from an opera.
