= Lazar Kujundžić =

Serbian Chetnik commander (1880–1905)

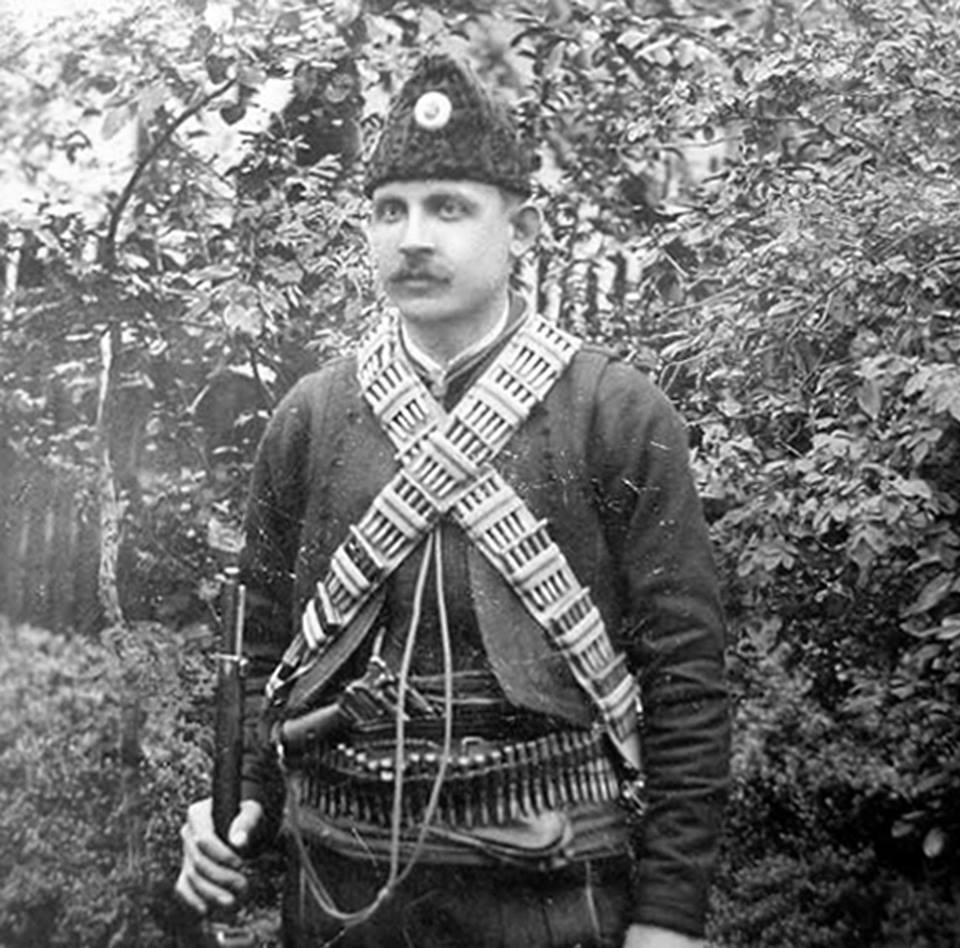
- Lazar Kujundžić, 1904–05
- Born: 1880; Rahofça, Kosovo Vilayet, Ottoman Empire
- Died: May 25, 1905 (25 years); Büyük Hoça, Kosovo Vilayet, Ottoman Empire
- Military career
- Allegiance: Serbian Chetnik Organization (1903–05)
- Service years: 1903–05
- Nickname: Lazar Klempa
- Conflicts: Serbian operation in Macedonia

Lazar Kujundžić-Klempa (Serbian Cyrillic: Лазар Кујунџић: 1880 – May 25, 1905) was a Serbian Chetnik commander (vojvoda) who was active in Old Serbia and Macedonia.

== Biography ==
He was born in Orahovac, Kosovo, near Prizren. He graduated from a teacher's college at the Orthodox seminary in Prizren. He was a teacher in Prizren and Kičevo. He participated in the Fight on Čelopek when the Chetniks destroyed the Turkish forces. After the fight, he did not want to flee into Serbia but continued to operate in Ottoman-occupied Old Serbia with commanders Savatije Milošević and Živojin Milovanović. On the Feast of the Ascension, his band appeared in Velika Hoča. They were received by Albanian Lanja Ukin who had given them his word (besa) that nothing would happen to them in his house, however, he immediately alarmed the Turks in Orahovac who surrounded them. They set the house on fire. The Chetniks shot back and sung Chetnik songs. The Turks brought Lazar's mother to recognize him for them, but she did not, in order to save her village and family.

During the Interwar period, he was hailed as a great hero.

== In Serbian Literature ==
The heroic deaths of Kujundžić and Milošević inspired Milan Rakić to write a poem "At Gazi Mestan", and the stoic comportment of Lazar's mother moved Serbian Catholic Ivo Vojnović to write a play called "The Resurrection of Lazar" (Lazarevo Vaskrsenje) in 1913. Another poet and veteran Chetnik Milosav Jelić dedicated a poem to Lazar Kujunžić's mother -- Majka Kujundžića—in his collection of poems, Srpski vijenac (Serbian Garland).

== See also ==
- List of Chetnik voivodes

== Sources ==
- Trbić, Vasilije (1996). Memoari: 1898-1912 (in Serbian). Kultura. ISBN 9788678010132.
- Nikolajević, Dušan S. (June 1936). "Лазар Кујунџић". Београдске Општинске новине. 54 (6–7): 468–470.
- Ranković, Ž. J. (April 1939). "Четничка акција I". Београдске Општинске новине. 57 (4): 173–184.
- K., S. (7 June 1930). "Јуначка смрт..." Vreme. p. 2.
