= Šaprance =

Šaprance Шапранце
- Village
- Location within Serbia
- Country: Serbia
- Region: Southern and Eastern Serbia
- District: Pčinja
- Municipality: Trgovište

Population (2002)
  - Total: 83
- Time zone: UTC+1 (CET)
  - Summer (DST): UTC+2 (CEST)

Šaprance is a village in the municipality of Trgovište, located in southeastern Serbia. According to the 2002 census, its population was 83.
