= Savatije Milošević =

Serbian Chetnik commander (1876–1905)

- Born: 1876; Pavlica, Raška, Ottoman Empire (now Serbia)
- Died: May 25, 1905 (aged 29 or 30); Velika Hoča, Ottoman Empire (now Kosovo)
- Military career
- Allegiance: Serbian Chetnik Organization (1903–05)
- Service years: 1903–05
- Rank: vojvoda (duke)
- Nickname: Ivan Kosančić

Savatije Milošević (Serbian Cyrillic: Саватије Милошевић; 1876 – 1905), known as Vojvoda Savatije, was a Serbian hajduk and Chetnik commander.

== Life ==
=== Early life ===
Savatije Miličević Milošević (Саватије Миличевић Милошевић) was born in Pavlica, Raška, at the time part of the Ottoman Empire (today Serbia).

At the age of 25, Milošević murdered Pavle Jasnić, a chief of a srez (municipality) in Raška, because of a blood feud, and joined the hajduks (brigands) with whom he was active in the Ottoman Empire. He found refuge in Peć, Kosovo Vilayet, at the house of Albanian kachak Mula Zeka. When the authority started searching for him, he fled to the Principality of Montenegro.

=== Serbian Chetnik Organization ===
He participated in the famous battle at Čelopek (April 1905). Together with Lazar Kujundžić and Živojin Milovanović he turned and went for Poreče, through Kosovo and Metohija and Podgora, in order to bypass Ottoman harassing in the Kumanovo region. Milovanović, as a Serbian officer, was to establish the headquarters of Western Povardarje. The company was betrayed in Velika Hoča on May 25, 1905, by local Albanians who had initially promised (see besa) their security, thus they were forced to battle the Ottoman Army and neighbouring Albanian kachaks where they were killed.

== Legacy ==
A street in the Zvezdara neighbourhood of Belgrade bears his name, as well as a street in the town of Raška.

== See also ==
- List of Chetnik voivodes
