= Hoçë e Madhe =

Hoçë e Madhe: Hoçë e Madhe or Hoça e Madhe (Albanian) Velika Hoča or Велика Хоча (Serbian)
- Village
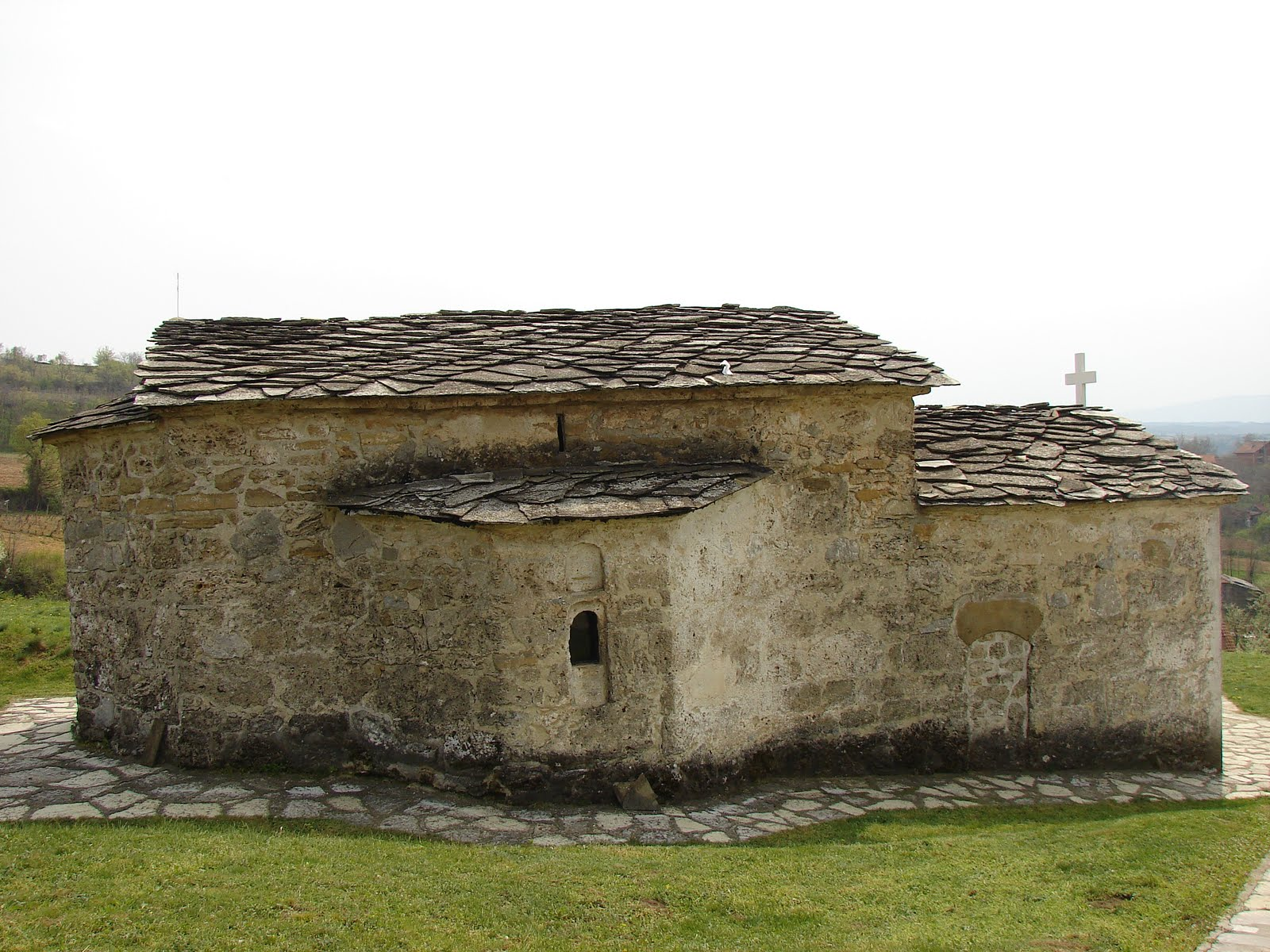
- St Jovan Monastery (overview)

- Location in Kosovo
- Location: Kosovo
- District: Gjakova
- Municipality: Rahovec

Population (2024)
  - Total: 508
- Time zone: UTC+1 (CET)
  - Summer (DST): UTC+2 (CEST)

Hoçë e Madhe (Albanian definite form: Hoça e Madhe) or Velika Hoča (Serbian Cyrillic: Велика Хоча) is a village in the municipality of Rahovec, in Kosovo. As of 2024, the village has 508 inhabitants, of whom 114 are Albanians and 384 are Serbs.

It is situated in the historical region of Metohija (Dukagjin) and is one of the oldest settlements. It was given as metochion by Stefan Nemanja to Hilandar in 1198–99 (Charter of Hilandar).

The main economic activity is viticulture.

== Culture ==
The village is noted for its 13 Serbian Orthodox churches, some dating from the 12th century and reign of Serbian Grand Prince Stefan Nemanja, others from the 14th to 16th centuries.

List of churches

- Church of St. Nicholas, Velika Hoča
- Church of St. John, Velika Hoča
- Church of St. Stephen, Velika Hoča
- Church of the Holy Sunday, Velika Hoča
- Church of Parascheva, Velika Hoča
- Church of St. Luke, Velika Hoča
- Church of St. Anne, Velika Hoča
- Church of St. Basil, Velika Hoča
- Church of the Holy Apostle Peter, Velika Hoča
- Church of the Virgin Mary, Velika Hoča
- Church of the Prophet Elijah, Velika Hoča
- Church of the Holy Archangel Gabriel, Velika Hoča
- Church on Rid
