= Tabanovce =

Tabanovce Табановце Tabanoc
- Village
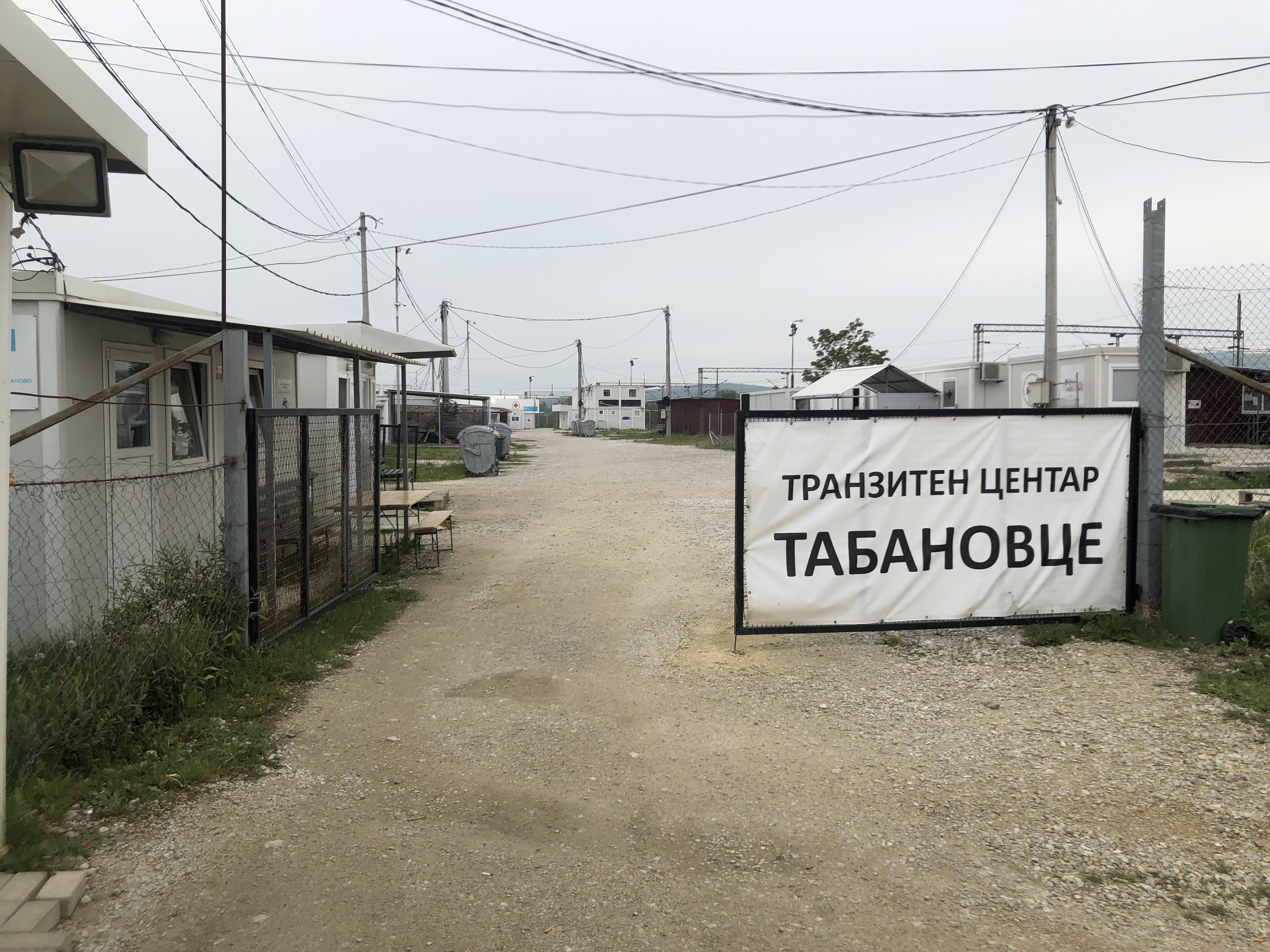
- Transit centre for migrants in Tabanovce

- Location within North Macedonia
- Coordinates: 42°12′53″N 21°42′30″E
- Country: North Macedonia
- Region: Northeastern
- Municipality: Kumanovo

Population (2021)
  - Total: 817
- Time zone: UTC+1 (CET)
  - Summer (DST): UTC+2 (CEST)
- Car plates: KU

Tabanovce (Macedonian: Табановце; Albanian: Tabanoc) is a village located in the north of North Macedonia, at the border with Serbia, situated eight kilometres (5 mi) from the nearest town, Kumanovo.

== Geography ==
It is located in the north of North Macedonia, at the border with Serbia, situated eight kilometres (5 mi) from the nearest town, Kumanovo.

== History ==
- Fight in Tabanovce (1905)

== Demographics ==
Total Resident Population (2021 Census)
| Ethnic Affiliation | Total Count | Percentage | Change (from 2002) |
|---|---|---|---|
| Serbs | 294 | 36.0% | ▼222 |
| Macedonians | 241 | 29.5% | ▲26 |
| Albanians | 211 | 25.8% | ▲34 |
| Unlisted | 67 | 8.2% | --- |
| Other | 4 | 0.5% | ▼8 |
| Totals: | 817 | 100% | ▼93 |

Total Resident Population (2002 Census)
| Ethnic Affiliation | Total Count | Percentage |
|---|---|---|
| Serbs | 516 | 56.7% |
| Macedonians | 205 | 22.5% |
| Albanians | 177 | 19.5% |
| Other | 12 | 1.3% |
| Totals: | 910 | 100% |

== Culture ==
The unusual ending -це (-ce) as opposed to -ци (-ci) (cf. Kavadarci) reflects the local dialect, which is a form of Torlak, similar to what is spoken in Kumanovo, and by the Serb population of Preševo.

- Kodža Mehmet Beg Mosque
