= September 1905 =

Month of 1905

<<	September 1905					>>
Su	Mo	Tu	We	Th	Fr	Sa
					1	2
3	4	5	6	7	8	9
10	11	12	13	14	15	16
17	18	19	20	21	22	23
24	25	26	27	28	29	30

September 5, 1905: Treaty of Portsmouth signed by Russia and Japan to end the Russo-Japanese War.

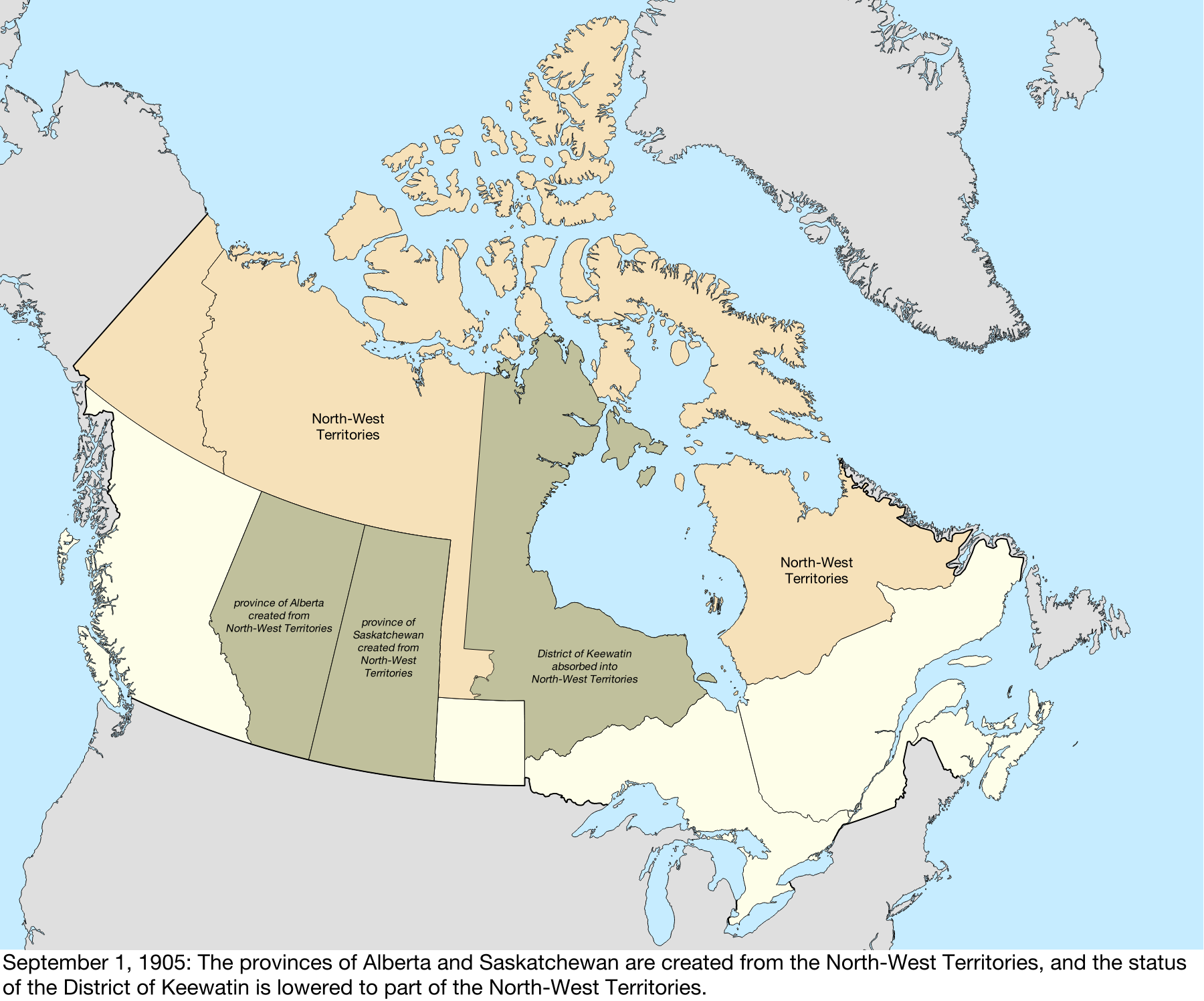
September 1, 1905: Alberta and Saskatchewan established as provinces of Canada.

== September 1, 1905 (Friday) ==
- The Canadian provinces of Alberta and Saskatchewan were established, from the southwestern part of the Northwest Territories.
- At the peace conference in Portsmouth, New Hampshire, the representatives of Russia and Japan agreed to a ceasefire to become operative immediately upon signing of a peace treaty.
- The British Imperial Army Council announced that it would provide free fortifications to the Dominion of Canada to protect the province of Nova Scotia, and that supplies, ammunition and small arms would be provided at cost.
- Navy Secretary Bonaparte announced that he would court-martial the commander of the USS Bennington and an ensign for charges arising from the deadly boiler explosion.
- Born:
  - Chau Sen Cocsal Chhum, Prime Minister of Cambodia in 1962; in Tri Tôn, French Indochina (now in Vietnam) (d. 2009)
  - Father Chrysanthus (Wilhelmus Janssen), Dutch Roman Catholic priest who became an expert on spiders; in Mill, North Brabant (d. 1972) The species Neoscona chrysanthusi and Nasoona chrysanthusi were named in his honor.
  - Elvera Sanchez, Puerto Rican U.S. dancer and mother of Sammy Davis Jr.; in San Juan, Puerto Rico (d. 2000)

== September 2, 1905 (Saturday) ==
- A powerful gale on Lake Superior in North America sank several ships, killing at least 35 people including the 19 crew of the steamer Iosco and the ship Olive Jeanette.
- France sent an ultimatum to the Sultan of Morocco demanding an apology and indemnity for the August 22 arrest of a French Algerian merchant.

== September 3, 1905 (Sunday) ==
- At least 30 people were killed by a terrorist bomb in Barcelona while watching a parade of Spanish Marine Infantry.
- Los Angeles was struck by a major earthquake, but without significant damage.
- Born: Carl David Anderson, American physicist, 1936 Nobel Prize laureate for his discovery of the positron, later the discoverer of the muon; in New York City (d. 1991)

== September 4, 1905 (Monday) ==
- A cause of action began that would lead to the landmark 1908 U.S. Supreme Court decision of Muller v. Oregon when Mrs. Elmer Gotcher, an employee of the Grand Laundry in Portland, Oregon (owned by Curt Muller), was told by foreman Joe Haselbock that she would have to continue working beyond the 10-hour shift that she had spent already. Mrs. Gotcher complained, and Muller was charged with a violation of a 1903 Oregon law that set a maximum work day of 10 hours for female employees of factories and laundries, though the law did not apply to male employees. The Supreme Court ruling set would a precedent that laws that applied separately by gender were not violative of Equal Protection Clause of the U.S. Constitution.
- Amédée E. Forget was sworn in as the first Lieutenant Governor of Saskatchewan, answering to the Governor-General of Canada (there being no office of "Governor") and was tasked with choosing an acting Premier of Saskatchewan until elections could be held. Forget would select Thomas Walter Scott to the position.

== September 5, 1905 (Tuesday) ==
- The Treaty of Portsmouth was signed by representatives of the Empire of Japan and the Russian Empire to end the Russo-Japanese War, following mediation by U.S. President Theodore Roosevelt in Portsmouth, New Hampshire. In return for peace, Russia ceded half of the island of Sakhalin to Japan, together with its seaport and railway rights in Manchuria.
- The Zemstvo Congress at Moscow voted to take an active part in elections for the proposed Duma.
- Born: Arthur Koestler, Hungarian-born novelist and social philosopher; in Budapest (d. 1983)
- Died:
  - Touch the Clouds (Maȟpíya Ičáȟtagya), 67, Chief of the Miniconjou Lakota Indians of South Dakota;
  - Hezekiah Butterworth, 65, American author and poet

== September 6, 1905 (Wednesday) ==
- The patent application for the cotton candy machine was filed by Albert D. Robinson of Lynn, Massachusetts submitted his patent for "Controlling an Electric Candy-Spinning Machine", making the creation of cotton candy (also called "candy floss") safe and practical, with a design that would be used more than a century later. Robinson would be granted U.S. Patent No. 856,424 on June 11, 1907.
- The University of Kansas School of Medicine began its first classes, opening at a campus in Kansas City, Kansas after the merger of an existing two-year program at the main campus at Lawrence with three medical colleges in Kansas City.
- Born: Walther Müller, German-born U.S. physicist, creator of the Geiger-Müller tube; in Hanover (d. 1979)
- Died: Thomas Menees, 82, American physician who served in the Confederate States Congress during the American Civil War, later the dean of the Vanderbilt University college of medicine

== September 7, 1905 (Thursday) ==
- The first "bird strike" in aviation history took place as Orville Wright was piloting the Wright Flyer over a cornfield near Dayton Ohio and his airplane struck a red-winged blackbird. Wright was able to land the plane safely.
- Died: Cardinal Raffaele Pierotti, 69, papal theologian for Pope Leo XIII of the Roman Catholic Church

== September 8, 1905 (Friday) ==
- The 7.2 magnitude Calabria earthquake, rated extreme on the Mercalli intensity scale level XI, struck southern Italy and killed at least 557 people, and perhaps as many as 2,500. The quake destroyed 18 villages outside of the city of Calabria as well as causing hundreds of deaths in Calabria itself.
- Born: Eino Tainio, Finnish politician (d. 1970).
- Died: Henry Slade, 80, American illusionist who claimed to be a spiritualist medium who could talk to the dead

== September 9, 1905 (Saturday) ==
- Denmark-born Oscar Nelson, better known as "Battling Nelson", won the world lightweight boxing championship in a 45-round fight against titleholder Jimmy Britt, held at the Mission Street Arena in the San Francisco suburb of Colma. Nelson, who had lost to Britt on December 20, 1904, knocked Britt out in the 18th round to win a purse of $18,841. Films of the fight were made by the Miles Brothers Company, and the event was replayed to paying viewers at movie theaters across North America.
- A gunpowder explosion killed 19 employees of the Rand Powder Mills in Fairchance, Pennsylvania, and seriously injured nine others.

== September 10, 1905 (Sunday) ==
- An arsenal explosion killed 251 officers and sailors on the Imperial Japanese Navy battleship Mikasa, the flagship of Admiral Togo.
- Tsar Nicholas II issued a ukase placing the government of universities in the hands of the professors.
- Crystal Palace F.C. was founded in London.
- Born: Ibrahim Biçakçiu, Prime Minister of Albania in 1943 and 1944; in Elbasan, Manastir vilayet, Ottoman Empire (d. 1977)

== September 11, 1905 (Monday) ==
- Twelve passengers on an elevated rail car in New York City were killed, and more than 40 injured, when the train car fell to the street because of the wrong setting of a switch on the tracks.
- The execution of a Polish Socialist leader led to a general strike in Warsaw in the Russian-controlled Congress Poland
- Emperor Franz Josef of Austria-Hungary rejected the Hungarian Assembly's proposal for women suffrage.

== September 12, 1905 (Tuesday) ==
- The railway bridge over the Zambezi River was formally opened in southern Africa, reducing the travel time for trains on the Capetown to Cairo Railway.
- Born:
  - Ali Amini, Prime Minister of Iran 1961–1962; in Tehran (d. 1992)
  - Linda Agostini, English-born Australian murder victim; in Forest Hill, London (killed 1934)

== September 13, 1905 (Wednesday) ==
- In Helsinki, at the time part of the Russian-ruled Grand Duchy of Finland, Imperial Army troops with bayonets forcibly broke up the meeting of 800 delegates who had gathered from towns across the Duchy to discuss independence.
- Died: René Goblet, 76, Prime Minister of France 1886 to 1887

== September 14, 1905 (Thursday) ==
- After a meeting of Finnish representatives at Helsingfors, threats were made to kill the Russian Governor-General of Finland.
- The Prime Minister of Hungary and his cabinet of ministers resigned.
- Died: Pierre Savorgnan de Brazza, 53, Italian-born French explorer for whom the Republic of Congo's capital, Brazzaville, was named, died of a tropical illness contracted during his Mission Extraordinaire

== September 15, 1905 (Friday) ==
- As part of the armistice in the Russo-Japanese War, Japan's Marshal Oyama and Russia's General Linevich agreed to set up a demilitarized zone 4 kilometres (2.5 mi) wide between the positions of the two armies.

== September 16, 1905 (Saturday) ==
- A joint announcement was made at Karlstad by the commissioners of Sweden and Norway to assure citizens in the Union that there would be no war between the two countries after separation.

== September 17, 1905 (Sunday) ==
- Several ministers of the Korean Empire agreed to allow Japan to control its foreign relations, with the Japanese Foreign Office having an official in Seoul.

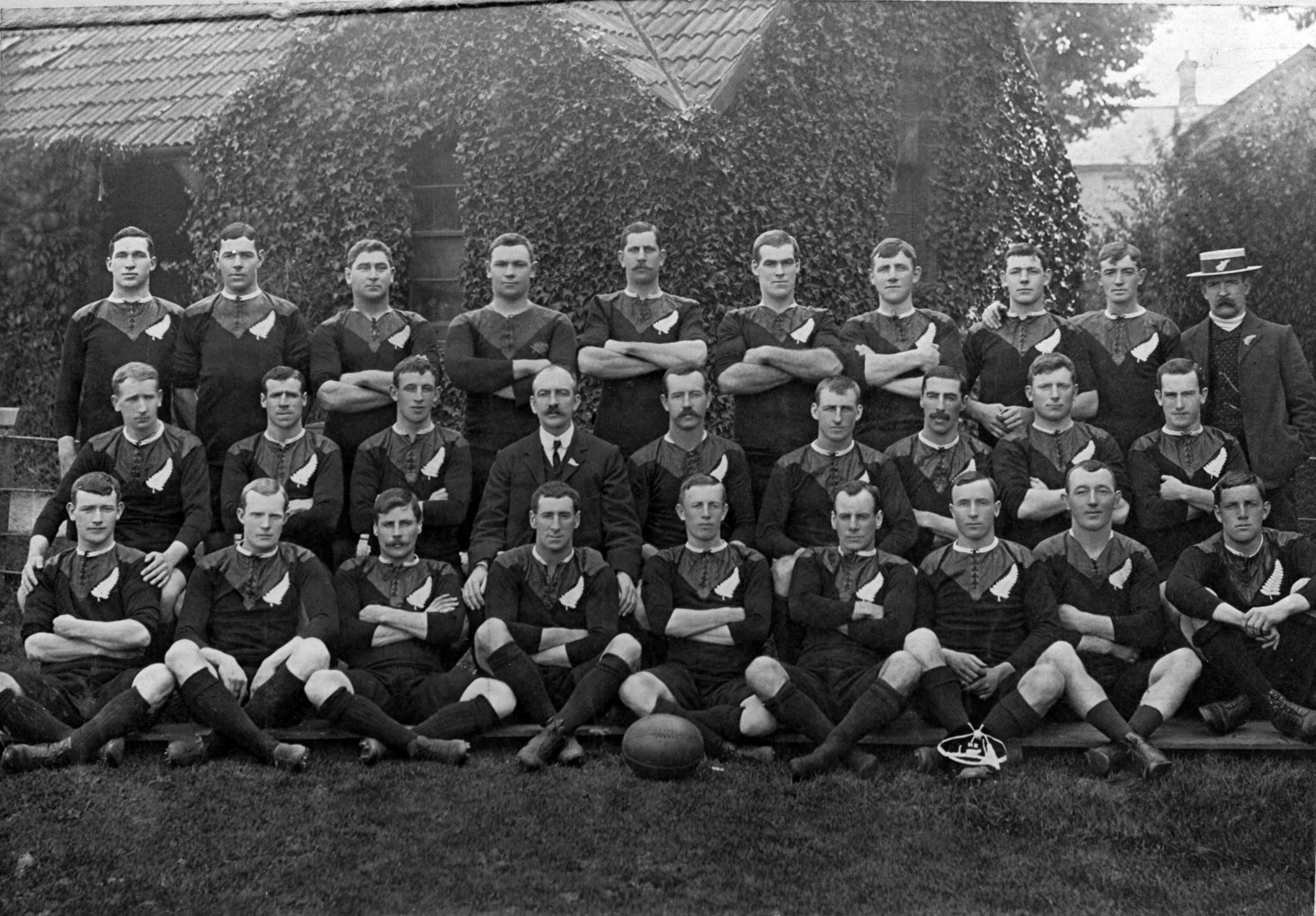
The All Blacks of 1905-06, wearing "their sable and unrelieved costume"

- The earliest recorded use of the name "All Blacks" for the New Zealand national rugby union team came the day after New Zealand's touring team defeated Devon, 55 to 4, at the opening match of the tour in Exeter. A reporter for the Exeter newspaper Express & Echo wrote that the name referred to the team's all black uniforms, commenting that "The All Blacks, as they are styled by reason of their sable and unrelieved costume, were under the guidance of their captain (Mr Gallaher), and their fine physique favorably impressed the spectators."
- Born:
  - Hans Freudenthal, German-born Dutch mathematician known for constructing Lincos, a proposed language for logical communication with extraterrestrial intelligence and for the Freudenthal spectral theorem; in Luckenwalde, Prussia (d. 1990)

== September 18, 1905 (Monday) ==
- Arsenio Cruz Herrera, the first Mayor of Manila, resigned his post after repeated disagreements with the U.S. Governor-General, Luke Wright. Cruz had served more than four years, starting when the position was created in 1901 to provide for Filipino governance of the capital of the Philippine Islands. He was succeeded by Felix Roxas.
- Born:
  - Greta Garbo, Swedish film actress (stage name for Greta Lovisa Gustafsson); in Stockholm (d. 1990)
  - Eddie Anderson, African-American radio and TV actor and comedian who co-starred with Jack Benny and Mary Livingstone on The Jack Benny Program; in Oakland, California (d. 1977)
  - Agnes de Mille, American choreographer; in New York City (d. 1993)
- Died: George MacDonald, 80, Scottish Congregational minister and pioneer writer in fantasy literature

== September 19, 1905 (Tuesday) ==
- A pair of mountain climbers, Rudolf Fehrmann of Germany and Oliver Perry-Smith of the U.S., became the first persons to successfully climb to the top of The Barbarine, a 140 feet (43 m) vertical rock formation in Germany's Elbe Sandstone Mountains
- Born: Judith Auer, Swiss-born German World War II resistance fighter; in Zürich (executed 1944)
- Died: Thomas John Barnardo, 60, Irish-born English philanthropist who founded (in 1866), the Barnardo's charity for vulnerable children

== September 20, 1905 (Wednesday) ==
- Stage magician and escape artist Harry Houdini, and a challenger who styled himself as "Jacques Boudini", participated in a challenge to see which person could get free first from handcuffs, chains and leg irons while underwater. Both men jumped from a tugboat at the same time into the Hudson River at New York City's Battery Park. Houdini escaped his handcuffs in 70 seconds and freed his feet 90 seconds later, while Boudini struggled beneath the surface before being rescued.
- On the Philippine island of Palawan, almost 100 prisoners were able to break out of the brutal Iwahig Penal Colony, with 33 escaping to freedom. Most of the 33 would either be killed or recaptured by a contingent of the Philippine Scouts stationed at Puerto Princesa.
- Died:
  - Adolf Hedin, 71, Swedish newspaper publisher and the oldest member of the Riksdag, with 35 years of service
  - Frederic Lawrence Knowles, 36, American poet, died of typhoid fever.

== September 21, 1905 (Thursday) ==
- The Italian town of Sutena in Italy was buried in an avalanche caused by sulphur mining operations on Mount San Paolino.
- The government of Russia announced that the ban against public meetings would be lifted, in order to allow campaigning for elections for the Duma.
- In the antitrust criminal case against the Chicago meatpackers, four officials of the Schwartzchild & Sulzberger Company pled guilty to charges of conspiracy to accept railroad kickbacks.
- Died:
  - Rudolf Baumbach, 64, popular German poet
  - Francisco García Calderón, 71, President of Peru in 1881 during the War of the Pacific

== September 22, 1905 (Friday) ==
- The leader of the Liberal Party of Cuba, Colonel Dillundas, was killed while on a visit to Cienfuegos, and the city's police chief was wounded.
- U.S. District Attorney Morrison announced that criminal charges would be taken against the railroads for giving rebates to shippers.
- Born:
- Haakon Lie, Norwegian politician who led the Norwegian Labor Party from 1945 to 1969; in Kristiania (now Oslo) (d. 2009)
- Eugen Sänger, Austrian aerospace engineer; in Pressnitz, Bohemia, Austria (now Přísečnice in the Czech Republic) (d. 1964)

== September 23, 1905 (Saturday) ==
- At Karlstad, the Swedish and Norwegian delegates reached a complete agreement on dissolution of the Union of Sweden and Norway. The agreement was published on September 25 in both Stockholm and Christiania (now Oslo)
- In voting in Cuba, President Palma was re-elected and his Moderate party received a majority in the Cuban Congress.
- Coalition leaders in Hungary rejected the ultimatum sent to them by the Emperor/King of Austria-Hungary.

== September 24, 1905 (Sunday) ==
- Representatives of the warring Armenians and Tatars signed a peace treaty at Baku, moderated by Prince Louis Napoleon, Governor-General of the Caucasian Governorate.
- Born: Severo Ochoa, Spanish–American biochemist, 1959 Nobel Prize in Physiology or Medicine laureate for his co-discovery with Arthur Kornberg for the mechanisms of DNA (d. 1993)

== September 25, 1905 (Monday) ==
- Elections were held for the Spanish Senate.
- The meeting of a political congress of 300 delegates from all parts of the Russian Empire was held in a large private house in Moscow, with the consent of the government.
- Health commissioners of Mississippi and Tennessee agreed to waive quarantine requirements against persons who were traveling back from Louisiana. The change was made after President Roosevelt announced his plan to visit New Orleans and then to come back through the neighboring states.
- Died: Godefroy Cavaignac, 52, French Minister of War who discovered evidence that Captain Alfred Dreyfus had been framed, but continued the prosecution anyway

== September 26, 1905 (Tuesday) ==
- Germany and France reached an agreement setting out their spheres of influence in Morocco.
- The six great powers notified the Ottoman Empire that they would assume financial control and jurisdiction over Macedonia and that the decision was inalterable. The Ottoman's entered their formal protest on October 2.
- The British Empire and the Chinese Empire announced that they had agreed to the basic terms for a treaty regarding the status of Tibet.
- The United Kingdom announced the terms of its military alliance with Japan.
- Born:
  - Juliana Koo, Chinese-American diplomat and supercentenarian who lived to age 111; in Tianjin (d. 2017)
  - Emilio Navarro, Puerto Rican U.S. baseball player who was the first Puerto Rican to play in the Negro leagues; in Patillas, Puerto Rico (d. 2011)

== September 27, 1905 (Wednesday) ==
- Albert Einstein submitted his paper "Does the Inertia of a Body Depend Upon Its Energy Content?" for publication, putting forward the idea of mass–energy equivalence and introducing the equation E = mc^{2}. The paper would be published on November 21.
- Died: Wheeler H. Peckham, 72, American lawyer whose 1894 appointment to the U.S. Supreme Court was rejected by the U.S. Senate

== September 28, 1905 (Thursday) ==
- Blockage of the Suez Canal by the sunken steamship Chatham is ended as the ship and its 90 tons of dynamite are exploded.
- The Talla reservoir, providing 2.75 billion gallons of fresh water to Edinburgh, was opened at Peeblesshire.
- Born: Max Schmeling, German boxer and world heavyweight champion from 1930 to 1932; in Klein Luckow (d. 2005)
- Died: T. Edgar Pemberton, 56, English novelist and playwright, died after a long illness

== September 29, 1905 (Friday) ==
- Russia and France reached an agreement on commerce, to take effect on March 1.

== September 30, 1905 (Saturday) ==
- The championship game of Australian rules football took place for the title of the Victorian Football League, with 28,000 spectators watching at Melbourne. Fitzroy defeated Collingwood, 4 goals, 6 points to 2 goals, 5 points. With a goal worth six points, the score was equivalent to a 30 to 17 victory.
- Born:
  - Nevill Francis Mott, English physicist and 1977 Nobel Prize laureate for his work on the electronic structure of amorphous semiconductors; in Leeds (d. 1996)
  - Savitri Devi, French-born Greek writer, National Socialist philosopher and spy; in Lyon (d. 1982)
  - Michael Powell, English filmmaker director; in Bekesbourne, Kent (d. 1990)
- Died: Juliusz Kunitzer, Polish industrialist and Russian collaborator, was shot to death at Łódź by activists of the Polish Socialist Party following the end of the five-day insurrection that ended June 25.
