= June 1905 =

Month of 1905

<<	June 1905					>>
Su	Mo	Tu	We	Th	Fr	Sa
				1	2	3
4	5	6	7	8	9	10
11	12	13	14	15	16	17
18	19	20	21	22	23	24
25	26	27	28	29	30

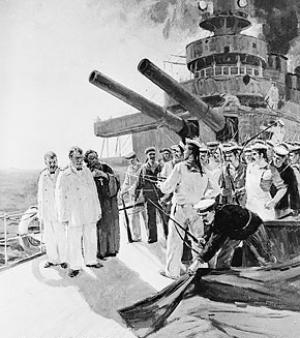
June 27, 1905:Mutineers seize the Russian battleship Potemkin

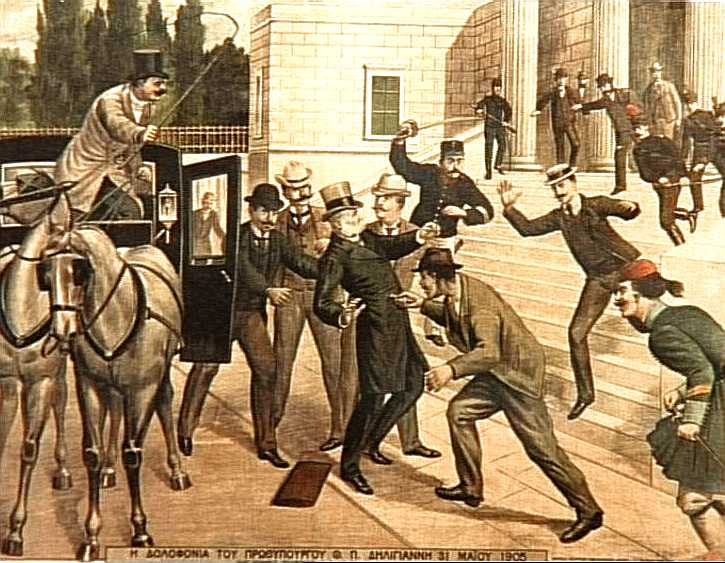
June 13, 1905: Greek Premier Deligiannis assassinated

== June 1, 1905 (Thursday) ==
- The Lewis and Clark Exposition, celebrating the centennial of the two explorers' arrival at the northwest United States, opened in Portland, Oregon.
- The Sultan of Morocco rejected France's demands for a scheme of reforms.
- Born: Robert Newton, English actor and action film star; in Shaftesbury, Dorset, (d. 1956)
- Died:
  - Giovanni Battista Scalabrini, 64, Italian Roman Catholic saint who founded the Missionaries of St. Charles Borromeo, popularly known as the Scalabrinians. He would be canonized on October 9, 2022.
  - Émile Delahaye, 61, French automotive engineer who founded the Delahaye Automotive Company

== June 2, 1905 (Friday) ==
- The palace of Spain's Governor-General of Catalonia in Barcelona was seriously damaged by a bomb.
- Board chairman H. C. Frick and several other directors of the Equitable Life Insurance resigned after a Congressional investigation of the company's scandal was made public. Former U.S. Secretary of the Navy Paul Morton was elected the new chairman of the board on June 9.

== June 3, 1905 (Saturday) ==
- Russia's three surviving cruisers from the Battle of Tsushima-- Oleg, Aurora and Jemchug—limped into Manila Harbor with serious damages.
- Born:
- Tupua Tamasese Meaʻole, Western Samoan paramount chief and joint head of state (O le Ao o le Malo); in Vaimoso (d. 1963)
- Martin Gottfried Weiss, Nazi commandant of the Dachau concentration camp and convicted war criminal; in Weiden in der Oberpfalz (d. 1946)
- Died: Hudson Taylor, 73, British-born Baptist Christian missionary to China and founder of the China Inland Mission

== June 4, 1905 (Sunday) ==
- Morocco's Foreign Minister asked the major powers for an international conference on France's demands. Germany joined in the proposal on June 8.
- Died: Jan Mikulicz-Radecki, 55, Polish and German surgeon and pioneer of the use of antiseptics in surgery, known for Mikulicz's disease and the Mikulicz's drain procedure for treatment of wounds with sterile gauze. died of stomach cancer.

== June 5, 1905 (Monday) ==
- U.S. President Theodore Roosevelt informed Russia that it would have to remove three Imperial Navy cruisers that had fled to Manila Bay to repair damages sustained at the Battle of Tsushima. On June 10, Admiral Enquist of Russia replied that the cruisers would remain anyway.
- The Russian Navy cruiser Terck sank the British steamer Ikhona.
- Venezuela and Colombia resumed diplomatic relations.
- Died: Małgorzata Szewczyk, 76, Polish nun known as Mother Lucja, founder of the Daughters of the Sorrowful Mother of God

== June 6, 1905 (Tuesday) ==
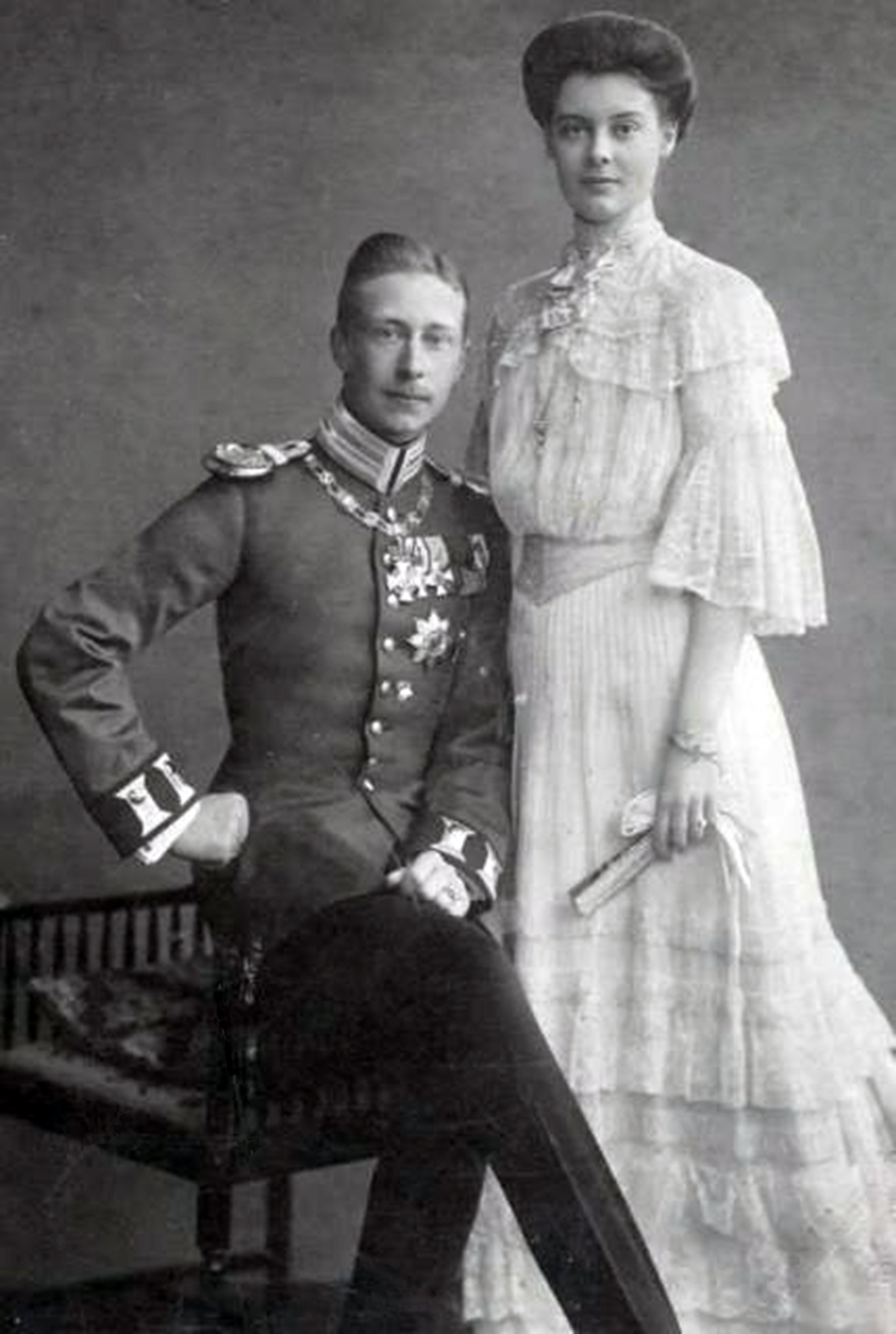
Prince Wilhelm and Duchess Cecilie

- In Germany's last royal wedding, Crown Prince Wilhelm, son of Kaiser Wilhelm II and heir to the throne, was married to Duchess Cecilie of Mecklenburg-Schwerin at Berlin.

== June 7, 1905 (Wednesday) ==
- The Norwegian Parliament, the Storting, declared dissolution of the union between Norway and Sweden, giving Norway full independence. While King Oscar protested the action, there was no disturbance in either nation.
- Born: James J. Braddock, American boxer and world heavyweight champion from 1935 to 1937; in New York City) (d. 1974)
- Died: Carl Kellner, 53, Austrian industrialist, co-inventor of the Castner-Kellner process, later the founder of Ordo Templi Orientis (O.T.O.) Rosicrucrian order, died of an infection.

== June 8, 1905 (Thursday) ==
- The sinking of a Royal Navy torpedo boat during maneuvers killed 14 officers and men.

== June 9, 1905 (Friday) ==
- King Oscar of Sweden declined a request from the Storting to nominate a king for Norway.
- Charlton Athletic F.C. was founded in London, England.

== June 10, 1905 (Saturday) ==
- Russia and Japan both accepted U.S. President Roosevelt's invitation to have a peace conference to end the Russo-Japanese War. On June 15, the event was tentatively scheduled for Washington, D.C. to begin by August 10.
- Norway's government lowered the flag of the Union of Sweden and Norway from all offices, and substituted the Norse tricolor flag.

== June 11, 1905 (Sunday) ==
- The Pennsylvania Railroad inaugurated express service that allowed travel between New York City and Chicago in only 18 hours.
- Sweden's government said that it would not recognize the secession of Norway from the Union of Sweden and Norway. The Storting replied on June 19 that it intended to proceed with secession anyway.

== June 12, 1905 (Monday) ==
- The Servants of India Society was founded by Gopal Krishna Gokhale, pledging "to train men for the work of political education and agitation, and to promote by all constitutional means the natural interests of the Indian people."
- The fastest speed ever set for a steam powered locomotive, 127.1 miles per hour (204.5 km/h) by the Pennsylvania Railroad's 4-4-2 7002.
- Born: Ray Barbuti, American sprint runner and Olympic gold medalist; in Brooklyn, New York (d. 1988)

== June 13, 1905 (Tuesday) ==
- Theodoros Deligiannis, Prime Minister of Greece since December 29, was stabbed to death by a professional gambler, Antony Gherakaris, as he was entering the Hellenic Parliament house. Deligiannis had recently led the government in outlawing gambling houses in Greece.
- Born: Franco Riccardi, Italian fencer and Olympic gold medalist 1928 and 1936; in Milan (d. 1968)

== June 14, 1905 (Wednesday) ==
- A gun explosion on the British battleship HMS Magnificent killed 18 sailors.

== June 15, 1905 (Thursday) ==
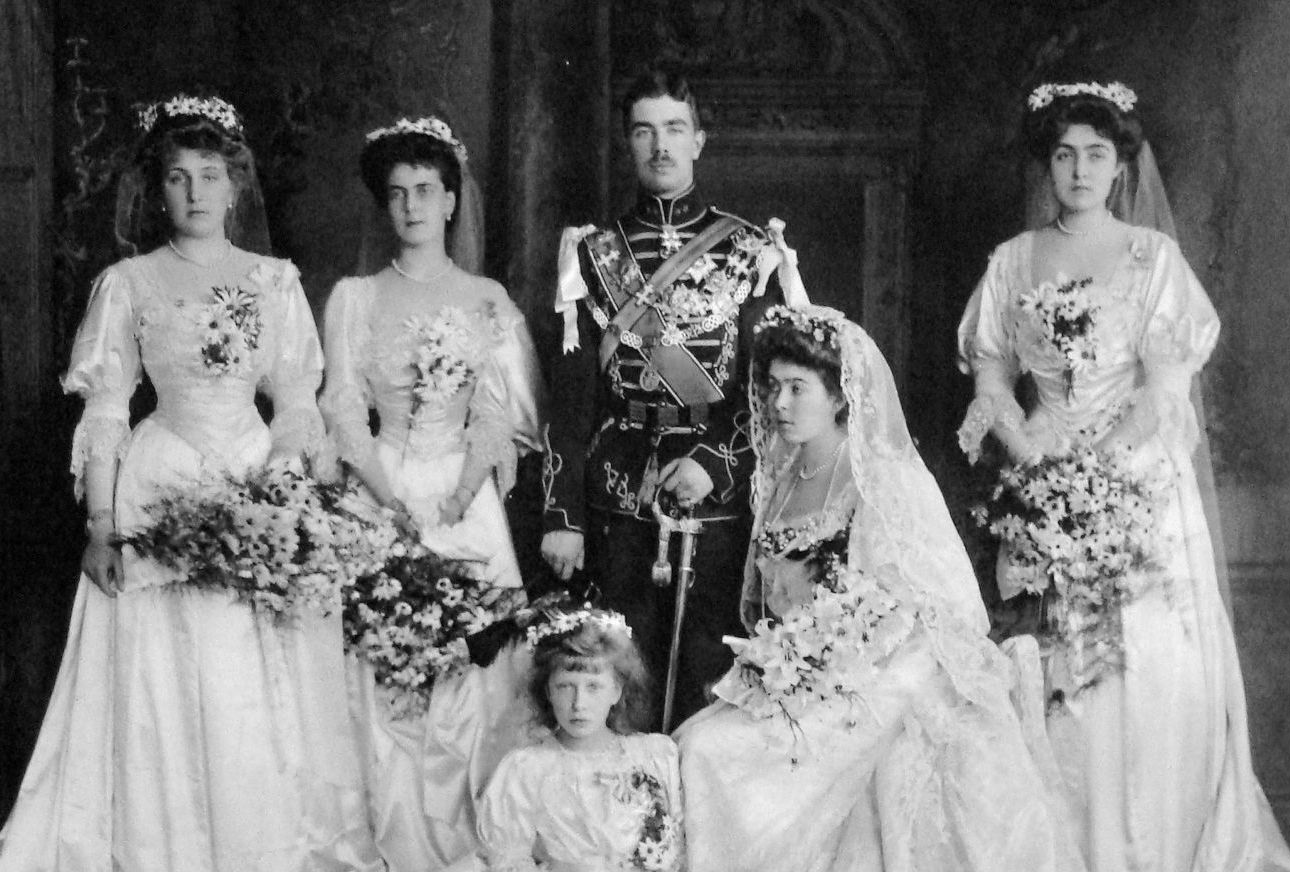
Prince Gustaf and Princess Margaret

- Princess Margaret of Connaught, the niece of King Edward VII of the United Kingdom, married Prince Gustaf Adolf of Sweden, Duke of Skåne, the future King Gustaf VI Adolf, in a ceremony in Britain at Windsor Castle.

== June 16, 1905 (Friday) ==
- As the Russo-Japanese War continued, Japan's Field Marshal Ōyama Iwao routed 3,000 Russian troops led by General Mistchenko in a battle at Liaoyang in Manchuria.

== June 17, 1905 (Saturday) ==
- The crash of a Western Maryland Railroad train at Ransen, Maryland, killed 23 people.
- France's prime minister and Germany's ambassador in Paris began conferences on the Moroccan situation.
- Died: Generalissimo Máximo Gómez, 68, Dominican-born Cuban independence fighter known for his brutal attacks on Spanish soldiers and sympathizers during the Cuban War of Independence

== June 18, 1905 (Sunday) ==
- A coal mine explosion in Russia killed 500 employees at the Ivan Colliery at Kharsisk.
- Géza Fejérváry took office as the new prime minister of the Kingdom of Hungary, after being appointed by Austro-Hungarian Emperor Franz Joseph (King Ferenc József). The Hungarian parliament voted to declare the Fejérváry ministry unconstitutional.
- Died:
  - Per Teodor Cleve, 65, Swedish chemist who discovered the elements holmium and thulium, as well as the aminonaphthalenesulfonic acids, also known as the Cleve's acids
  - Carmine Crocco, 75, Italian guerrilla leader

== June 19, 1905 (Monday) ==
- The U.S. signed postal treaties with Australia and Panama.
- Born: Mildred Natwick, American stage, film and TV actress; in Baltimore (d. 1994)

== June 20, 1905 (Tuesday) ==
- Dr. Ernest Henry Starling introduced the word "hormone" into the English language by coining the term in his paper "The Chemical Correlation of the Functions of the Body" in a lecture to the Royal College of Physicians in London.

== June 21, 1905 (Wednesday) ==
- The New York Central Railroad's flagship passenger train, the 20th Century Limited, was derailed in an apparent act of sabotage, by the leaving open of a switch in Mentor, Ohio, killing 21 people.
- King Oscar II of Sweden and Norway opened the Riksdag's new session and endorsed the recommendation of the Swedish government to negotiate with Norway's Storting for a peaceful dissolution of the union of the two nations.
- Born:
  - Jean-Paul Sartre, French existentialist and philosopher; in Paris (d. 1980)
  - Zeng Xueming, Chinese midwife and the first wife of Hồ Chí Minh; in Canton (d. 1991)

== June 22, 1905 (Thursday) ==
- Grand Duke Nicholas of Russia was appointed by the Tsar Nicholas II to be the new president of the Council of National Defense.
- Died: Francis Lubbock, 89, Confederate governor of Texas from 1861 to 1863

== June 23, 1905 (Friday) ==
- Eighteen months after their first powered flight, the Wright Brothers tested their new Wright Flyer III airplane.
- Russian troops killed 50 Polish independence demonstrators and wounded another 200 in the city of Lodz.
- Eugenio Montero Rios was sworn in as the new Prime Minister of Spain.

== June 24, 1905 (Saturday) ==
- Prime Minister Dimitrios Rallis of Greece formed a new cabinet of ministers.

== June 25, 1905 (Sunday) ==
- The Danish Navy training ship Georg Stage was accidentally sunk after a collision with the English steamship Ancona, killing 22 young recruits ranging in age from 14 to 17.
- Born:
- Mary Livingstone (stage name for Sadya Marcowitz), American comedienne, actress and radio co-star with her husband Jack Benny; in Seattle (d. 1983)
- Arthur Rabenalt, Austrian film director; in Vienna, Austria-Hungary (d. 1993)
- Jun'ichi Yoda, Japanese poet and author of children's books; in Fukuoka (d. 1997)

== June 26, 1905 (Monday) ==
- The House of Commons rejected a motion of no confidence in the government of British prime minister Arthur Balfour, after revelations of corruption in the British Army.

== June 27, 1905 (Tuesday) ==
- Mutiny broke out on the Russian ironclad Potemkin. The principal officers were killed as the mutineers seized the ship on the Black Sea and steered it into the harbor of Odessa, where a riot had broken out (The event was June 14 on Russia's "old style" calendar at the time). The Russian Navy's Black Sea squadron was dispatched from Sevastopol to either capture or sink the rebel battleship. By June 29, over 1,000 people had been killed in street fighting and the Potemkin began shelling of the city.
- Born: Kwan Tak-hing, Hong Kong actor; in Guangzhou, Chinese Empire (d. 1996)
- Died: Grigory Vakulenchuk, 27, Ukrainian sailor in the Imperial Russian Navy who instigated the mutiny on the Potemkin, was shot and killed by officers in the early moments of the uprising

== June 28, 1905 (Wednesday) ==
- A portion of the "Pomp And Circumstance March No. 1 In D", subtitled "Land of Hope and Glory", composed by Sir Edward Elgar and simply referred to in North America as "Pomp and Circumstance", was first played as a graduation march, after Yale University music professor Samuel Sanford invited Elgar to receive an honorary degree.
- Born: Ashley Montagu, British-born American anthropologist; in London (d. 1999)

== June 29, 1905 (Thursday) ==
- The Automobile Association was founded in the United Kingdom.
- Imperial Russian Navy sailors at Libau (now Liepāja in Latvia) mutinied.

== June 30, 1905 (Friday) ==
- Albert Einstein submitted for publication his paper "On the Electrodynamics of Moving Bodies", establishing his theory of special relativity. It would be published on September 26.
- Born:
- John Van Ryn, American tennis champion, Grand Slam doubles champion at Wimbledon (1929-1931), the French Open (1931) and the U.S. Open (1931, 1935); in Newport News, Virginia (d. 1999)
- Nestor Paiva, American TV and film actor; in Fresno, California (d. 1966)
