= October 1905 =

Month of 1905

| << | October 1905 | | | | | >> |
| Su | Mo | Tu | We | Th | Fr | Sa |
| 1 | 2 | 3 | 4 | 5 | 6 | 7 |
| 8 | 9 | 10 | 11 | 12 | 13 | 14 |
| 15 | 16 | 17 | 18 | 19 | 20 | 21 |
| 22 | 23 | 24 | 25 | 26 | 27 | 28 |
| 29 | 30 | 31 |

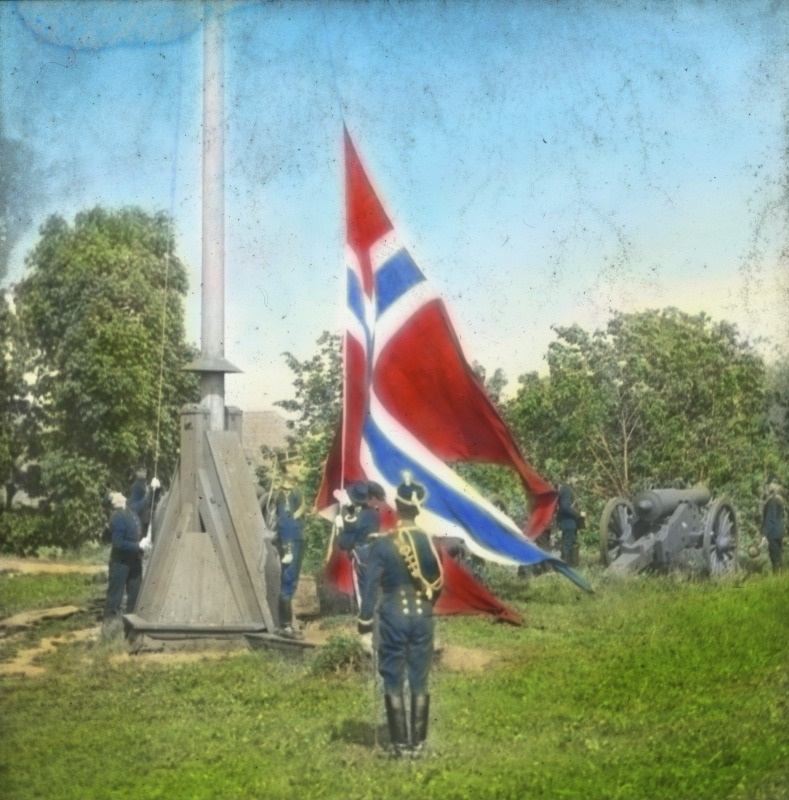
October 26, 1905: The Kingdom of Norway becomes a separate nation as Union of Sweden and Norway is dissolved

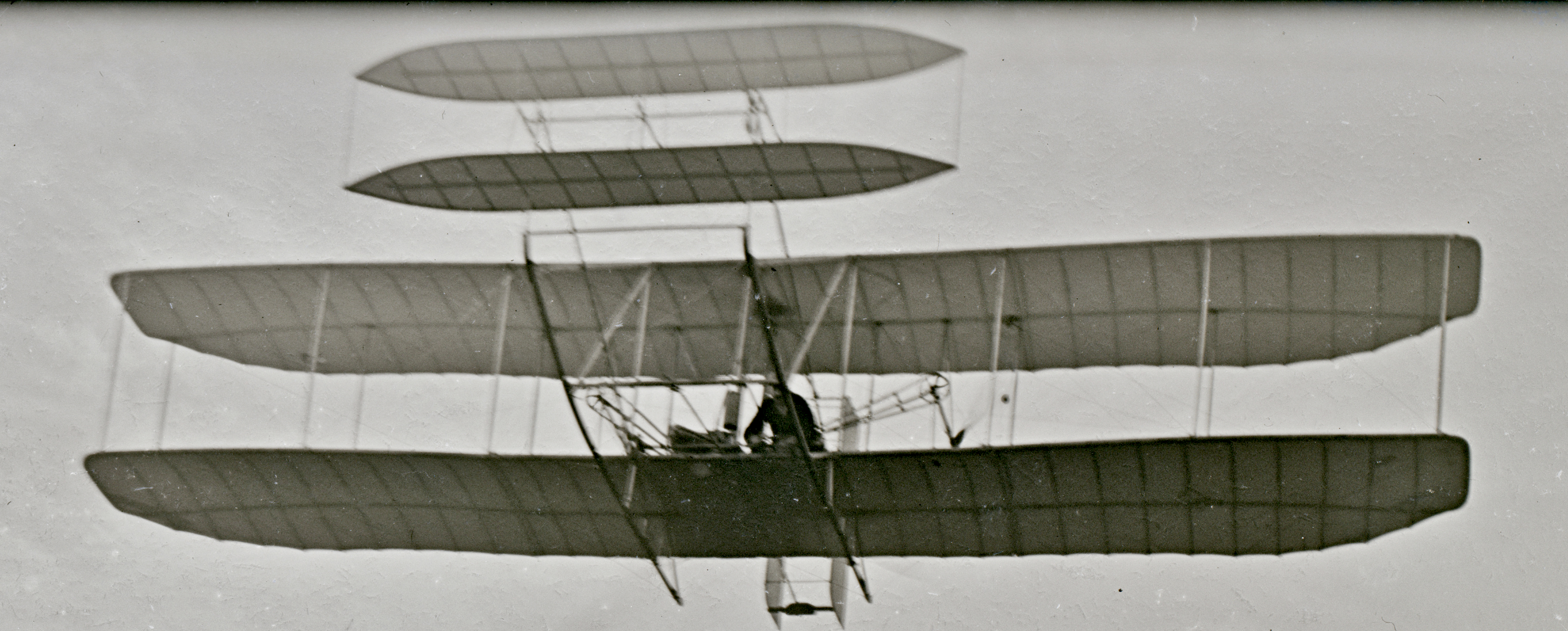
October 5, 1905: Wilbur Wright pilots the improved Wright Flyer III to an unprecedented 30 minute heavier-than-air flight

The following events occurred in October 1905:

== October 1, 1905 (Sunday) ==
- Lieutenant Commander Pyotr Schmidt of the Imperial Russian Navy incited a crowd of people in Sevastopol to march toward the city's prison and to demand the freedom of political prisoners there. Police fired in the crowd and killed and wounded an undetermined number of people.
- The luxurious Gotham Hotel, with 400 guestrooms, was opened on the corner of Fifth Avenue and 55th Street in Manhattan in New York City. The original owners would be forced to sell less than three years later, after repeated rejections for a liquor license. More than a century later, it operates (as of 2023) as "The Peninsula".
- Died: Donald W. Stewart, 45, British Army officer and Commissioner of the British East Africa protectorate (now Kenya) since 1904, died of pneumonia in Nairobi.

== October 2, 1905 (Monday) ==
- U.S. Secretary of State William H. Taft returned to his job as Secretary of War, and Elihu Root took permanent charge of the State Department.
- The Garfinckel's department store chain was started by the opening of a luxury store at Washington D.C. by Julius Garfinkle. After growing to a conglomerate of 190 stores in seven chains, Garfinckel's would file bankruptcy in 1990.
- Canada allowed the extradition of two fugitives, Gaynor and Greene, to the U.S. to face criminal charges.
- Born:
  - A. Felix du Pont Jr., U.S. aviator, co-founder of US Airways, and philanthropist; in Wilmington, Delaware (d. 1996)
  - Mary Marvin Breckinridge, American photojournalist, documentary maker and philanthropist; in New York City (d. 2002)
- Died: Louis William Desanges, 83, British painter

== October 3, 1905 (Tuesday) ==
- Several members of the Hungarian cabinet met in Vienna to discuss universal suffrage with Franz Josef I, Emperor of Austria and King of Hungary, as well as demanding why the Austrian premier was interfering with Hungarian electoral reforms.
- The G-Lader, a scroll-type supercharger to increase engine power, was patented by Leon Creux of France, who received U.S. Patent No. 801,182 for the invention, although production of the device would not become feasible until more than 75 years later.

== October 4, 1905 (Wednesday) ==
- Japan and Russia agreed to the exchange of prisoners of war from the Russo-Japanese War.
- The Alamo was conveyed to the Daughters of the Republic of Texas (DRT) in return for their agreement to provide maintenance and upkeep for the historic San Antonio mission and fortress. The DRT ownership of The Alamo would last almost 110 years, until the landmark's return to the Texas General Land Office in 2015.
- Grace Coolidge and Calvin Coolidge in the Married.
- Died: Henry Wilberforce Clarke, 65, British translator of Persian literature

== October 5, 1905 (Thursday) ==
- Wilbur Wright made a breakthrough in aviation by keeping an airplane aloft for more than half an hour, piloting the Wright Flyer III for 39 minutes and 23 seconds over Huffman Prairie near Fairborn, Ohio, traveling 24 miles (39 km) in a circular course. The longest time aloft in an airplane before the creation of the Wright Flyer III had been five minutes. Orville and Wilbur Wright disassembled the revolutionary airplane on November 5 to prevent the technology from being duplicated by competitors.
- More than three years after the deadly eruption of the Mount Pelée volcano on the Caribbean island of Martinique, all volcanic activity ceased. On April 23, 1902, the explosive blast had killed more than 29,000 people.

== October 6, 1905 (Friday) ==
- Japanese and Russian commanders in northern Korea were unable to agree on terms of an armistice.
- The first issue of the popular children's magazine Fame and Fortune Weekly (subtitled "Stories of Boys Who Make Money") was published by the Frank Tousey Company. It would continue as a weekly until 1928, and cease publication after the Wall Street Crash in 1929.
- Born:
  - Helen Wills, American tennis player; 8-time winner of Wimbledon, 7-time winner of the U.S. Open and 4-time winner of the French Open women's singles between 1923 and 1938; in Centerville, California (d. 1998)
  - Jarvis Catoe, American serial killer known as the "D.C. Strangler" for his murders of at least eight women in Washington D.C.; in South Carolina (executed, 1943)
- Died: Ferdinand von Richthofen, 72, German geographer and scientist, and uncle of World War One Manfred von Richthofen, "the Red Baron"

== October 7, 1905 (Saturday) ==
- Adventures of Sherlock Holmes; or, Held for Ransom, the first dramatic film using Sherlock Holmes as a character, was released by Vitagraph Studios.
- The Philadelphia Athletics completed the American League season with a record of 92 wins and 56 losses, finishing two games ahead of the Chicago White Sox (92-60) and qualified for the World Series against the New York Giants, who had easily won the National League pennant with a 105-48 record.
- Born: Andy Devine, American TV and film character actor in Westerns; in Flagstaff, Arizona (d. 1977)

Américo's most famous work

- Died: Pedro Américo, 62, Brazilian painter known for his detail in his history painting works, including the 1888 Independência ou Morte

== October 8, 1905 (Sunday) ==
- Argentina's National Congress voted to declare 90 days of martial law throughout the South American nation after the Argentine Workmen's Federation called a general strike.
- Born:
  - Raul Roulien, Brazilian-born film star in U.S. movies; in Rio de Janeiro (d. 2000)
  - René Cardona, Cuban-born Mexican film maker; in Havana (d. 1988)
- Died:
  - Josephine Shaw Lowell, 61, American social reform leader and co-creator of the National Consumers League, died of cancer.
  - Lord Inverclyde, 44, British shipping magnate and Chairman of the Cunard Steamship Company, died of pneumonia.

== October 9, 1905 (Monday) ==
- U.S. President Roosevelt convened a meeting at the White House with representatives for the teams of Harvard University, Yale University and Princeton University to demand reforms in the sport of American football in order to prevent serious injury and death. Roosevelt held a luncheon and gathered Walter Camp of Yale University and John B. Fine of Princeton University, both of whom were members of the Rules Committee of the Intercollegiate Football Association, as well as the football coaches of Harvard (Bill Reid), Princeton (Art Hillebrand) and Yale (Jack Owsley).
- Sergei Witte attended a meeting with Russia's Tsar Nicholas II at the Winter Palace in Saint Petersburg to warn the monarch that the Russian Empire was on the verge of a revolution, and advised that major reforms should be made or that a military dictator should rule the nation.
- By a vote of 101 to 16, Norway's Parliament, the Storting, agreed to accept the terms of dissolution of the Swedish-Norwegian Union in order to become a separate nation. On the same day, 10 Storting members from the Liberal Party proposed that Norway become a republic, with a president, rather than a monarchy.
- Born: Jack Parker British motorcycle speedway rider honored as the British Riders' Champion in 1947, and winner of the National Trophy 1946, 1947, and 1949; in Birmingham (d. 1989)

== October 10, 1905 (Tuesday) ==
- The Pacific Gas and Electric Company (PG&E), one of the largest electricity and natural gas utility companies in the United States, was created in California by the merger of the San Francisco Gas and Electric Company and the California Gas and Electric Corporation.
- In his role as King of Hungary, Franz Joseph dissolved the Hungarian parliament.
- The Privy Council of Japan ratified the Treaty of Portsmouth, ending the state of war between Russia and Japan.
- Galatasaray S.K., the most successful team in Turkish soccer football, was founded in Istanbul by Ali Sami Yen and friends meeting in a classroom at the Galatasaray High School.
- Born: Barrows Dunham, American philosophy professor and author; in Mount Holly, New Jersey (d. 1995)

== October 11, 1905 (Wednesday) ==
- The popular weekly Brazilian children's magazine, O Tico-Tico, published its first issue. It would operate until 1957, until being driven out of circulation by competing magazines.
- Born:
  - Cardinal Jean-Marie Villot, French Roman Catholic priest, Vatican Secretary of State from 1969 to 1979 and administrator of the Vatican's political and diplomatic affairs; in Saint-Amant-Tallende, Puy-de-Dôme département (d. 1979)
  - Victor Kravchenko, Soviet Ukrainian defector to the U.S. and author of the bestseller I Chose Freedom; in Ekaterinoslav, Russian Empire (now Dnipro, Ukraine) (committed suicide 1966)
  - Fred Trump, American real estate developer, father of U.S. President Donald J. Trump; in New York City (d. 1999)

== October 12, 1905 (Thursday) ==
- The National Library of Thailand, created from an acquisition by the Vajirañāṇa Library of the Mandira Dharma Library and the Buddhasasana Sangaha Library, was opened in Bangkok by order of King Rama V of Siam, Chulalongkorn .
- After recovering the battleship Potemkin following its abandonment by mutineers, the Imperial Russian Navy renamed the ship the Panteleimon, in honor of the Eastern Orthodox Saint Pantaleon.
- Born: Norman Banks, Australian sports broadcaster and radio commentator; in Sandringham, Victoria (d. 1985)

== October 13, 1905 (Friday) ==
- Sir Henry Irving, prominent in England as both a stage actor and the manager of the manager of the Lyceum Theatre on London's West End, suffered a fatal stroke shortly after returning to the Midland Hotel in Bradford/ Earlier in the evening, he had performed in the title role of Tennyson's play Becket. A fanciful, but invented, story would later be told by Thomas Anstey Guthrie that Irving had been stricken on stage while reciting Becket's dying words, "Into thy hands, O Lord, into thy hands" when he was stricken.
- Died: Lyman Bloomingdale, 64, U.S. businessman, philanthropist, and co-founder of the Bloomingdale's luxury department store in New York City.

== October 14, 1905 (Saturday) ==
- The Fédération Aéronautique Internationale (FAI), the world's governing body for air sports, was founded in Lausanne in Switzerland, to set standards for aeronautical activities, including certification of speed and altitude records.
- Both Tsar Nicholas II of Russia and Emperor Meiji of Japan signed the instruments of ratification of the Treaty of Portsmouth in their respective capitals. The U.S. Department of State was informed later in the day by the Russian Ambassador, Roman Rosen, and the Japanese Minister, Takahira Kogorō.
- Oregon U.S. Congressman John N. Williamson was found guilty of subornation of perjury (persuading or another person to give false testimony under oath) in connection with testimony concerning charges regarding land fraud, and sentenced to 10 months in prison. Williamson's conviction would be overturned by the U.S. Supreme Court in 1908, after he was no longer in office.
- The New York Giants won baseball's World Series, defeating the Philadelphia Athletics, 2 to 0 in Game 5 of the best 4-of-7 series.

== October 15, 1905 (Sunday) ==
- Claude Debussy's La mer ("The Sea"), a set of three symphonic sketches, was performed for the first time, with a concert in Paris by the Orchestre Lamoureux under the direction of conductor Camille Chevillard. Although it would later be considered one of Debussy's most popular works, it was poorly received at the time by the audience and by critics.
- The classic Sunday comic strip Little Nemo in Slumberland, written by cartoonist Winsor McKay, was introduced in the New York Herald.
- Russian Communist agitator Leon Trotsky sneaked into Saint Petersburg after having been in hiding in Finland, and addressed the Soviet Council of Workers Deputies there, while another 200,000 people were gathered outside to hear the speeches.
- The first railroad in what is now Israel, the Jezreel Valley railway, was inaugurated at the port of Haifa in Ottoman Palestine to allow shipping eastward to the Hejaz railway, a north-south line between Damascus and Medina.
- Born:
  - C. P. Snow, English novelist; in Leicester, Leicestershire (d. 1980)
  - Edna Deane, English ballroom dancer and instructor to celebrities; in Witsieshoek, Orange River Colony (now Phuthaditjhaba in South Africa) (d. 1995)
- Died: G. T. Fulford, 53, Canadian pharmaceutical manufacturer known for his worldwide marketing of Dr. Williams' Pink Pills for Pale People, Canadian Senator since 1900, was killed in an automobile accident while on a U.S. visit to Newton, Massachusetts.

== October 16, 1905 (Monday) ==
- The Partition of Bengal into an eastern Muslim section and a western Hindu section was decreed by the Viceroy of British India, Lord Curzon. The new province of Eastern Bengal and Assam had a Muslim majority province, with Dacca as its capital and Sir Bampfylde Fuller as its first governor, while the remainder of the Bengal Presidency was predominantly Hindu. The partition order would be reversed on December 12, 1911.
- Died: Nevins Armstrong, 70, Hawaiian-born American lawyer, Attorney General for the Kingdom of Hawaii for King Kalakaua during the King's world tour

== October 17, 1905 (Tuesday) ==
- U.S. President Theodore Roosevelt issued an Executive Order allowing heads of government departments to fire civil service employees without filing a charge or providing a hearing.
- Baron Géza Fejérváry was appointed again to serve as Prime Minister of Hungary in the Dual Kingdom of Austria and Hungary.
- Born: Leopoldo Benites, Ecuadorian ambassador to the United Nations who served as President of the UN General Assembly in 1973 and 1974; in Guayaquil (d. 1996)
- Died: John Rooney, 25, convicted murderer became the last person to be executed in the U.S. state of North Dakota, and the first and only prisoner to be legally executed privately, rather than in public. All previous hangings had been open to the public, and North Dakota abolished the death penalty 10 years after Rooney's hanging.

== October 18, 1905 (Wednesday) ==
- The Catholic Church Extension Society was established by Father Francis Kelley of Lapeer, Michigan, as a missionary organization to support the growth of the Roman Catholic religion in rural dioceses in the United States.
- Born: Félix Houphouët-Boigny, the first President of Côte d'Ivoire, from 1960 until his death, previously hereditary Chief of the Akoué tribe; as Dia Houphouët in Yamoussoukro, French West Africa (d. 1993)

== October 19, 1905 (Thursday) ==
- Through treachery, British Army intelligence officer Richard Meinertzhagen assassinated Koitalel Arap Samoei, leader of the Nandi people of Kenya. On the pretext of negotiating terms of a settlement between British colonial authorities and the Nandi kingdom to end the Nandi Resistance against British rule, Meinertzhagen came to a meeting at Koitalel's home, reached forward to shake hands with the Nandi leader, and then shot him at point-blank range. At the same time, Meinhartzhagen's men shot and killed all of the advisers who had accompanied Koitalel to the meeting.
- The only concerto of Finnish composer Jean Sibelius, the revised version of "Violin Concerto in D minor, Opus 47", was premiered by the Staatskapelle Berlin orchestra, and conducted by Richard Strauss. An earlier version, performed on February 8, 1904, was so complex that its performance was a failure.
- Born: Mary Clem, American mathematician credited with inventing the "zero check" technique for verifying accuracy on calculations; in Nevada, Iowa (d. 1979)
- Died:
  - Virgil Earp, 62, U.S. law enforcement officer who had led the confrontation that became the gunfight at the O.K. Corral in Tombstone, Arizona, in 1881, died of pneumonia.
  - Philip Mennell, 54, English-born journalist who created The Dictionary of Australasian Biography in 1892.

== October 20, 1905 (Friday) ==
- Alexander Kroesen, the colonial governor of the Celebes island in the Dutch East Indies (now Sulawesi in Indonesia) sent troops of the Royal Netherlands East Indies Army to attack the Sultanate of Gowa. Hari (2007). The attack on Gowa came after the Sultan, Husain Makkulau Karaeng Lembagaparang ignored an ultimatum from Governor Kroesen.
- All nine people aboard the Canadian schooner Minnedosa died when the four-masted schooner sank in a storm in Lake Huron. The ship was being towed by another ship, the Melrose, when the tow cable broke and the Minnedosa "abruptly disappeared."

== October 21, 1905 (Saturday) ==
- A nationwide railway strike tied up all rail lines that were entering and leaving Moscow, and spread to the rest of the Empire within a few days, extending closures as far west as Warsaw.
- U.S. President Theodore Roosevelt, making a tour of the Deep South, took the unprecedented step of addressing a gathering of African-Americans while he was in Jacksonville, Florida. Roosevelt insisted on the meeting at the Third Baptist Church Academy after the local organizing committee had refused to grant a request by black leaders for a public event. In part, Roosevelt said, "If we do our duties faithfully in spite of the difficulties that come, then sooner or later the rights will take care of themselves. What I say to this body of my colored fellow-citizens is just exactly what I would say to any body of my white fellow-citizens."

== October 22, 1905 (Sunday) ==
- Police in Santiago fired into a crowd of more than 25,000 protesters in Chile who had marched to the presidential office building, La Moneda and were demanding to see President Germán Riesco. The crowd, which was demonstrating against the high prices, caused by government tariffs on cattle imports from Argentina, was unaware that the president was unwell and was at his residence in another part of the city. After the protesters grew impatient over waiting, some tried to storm the building. The police response led to the "Meat Riot" (la huelga de la carne) that killed 230 civilians and 20 soldiers in over the next three days.
- The Battle of the Malalag River took place in the Philippines between U.S. troops and Moro rebels of the Sultanate of Maguindanao. The Moros sustained 12 deaths, including their commander, Datu Ali, while one U.S. soldier was killed, and 43 Moro prisoners of war were captured.
- Alexander Bulygin was dismissed from his position as Minister of the Interior of the Russian Empire by Tsar Nicholas II. As Interior Minister, Bulygin had been in charge of state security.

== October 23, 1905 (Monday) ==
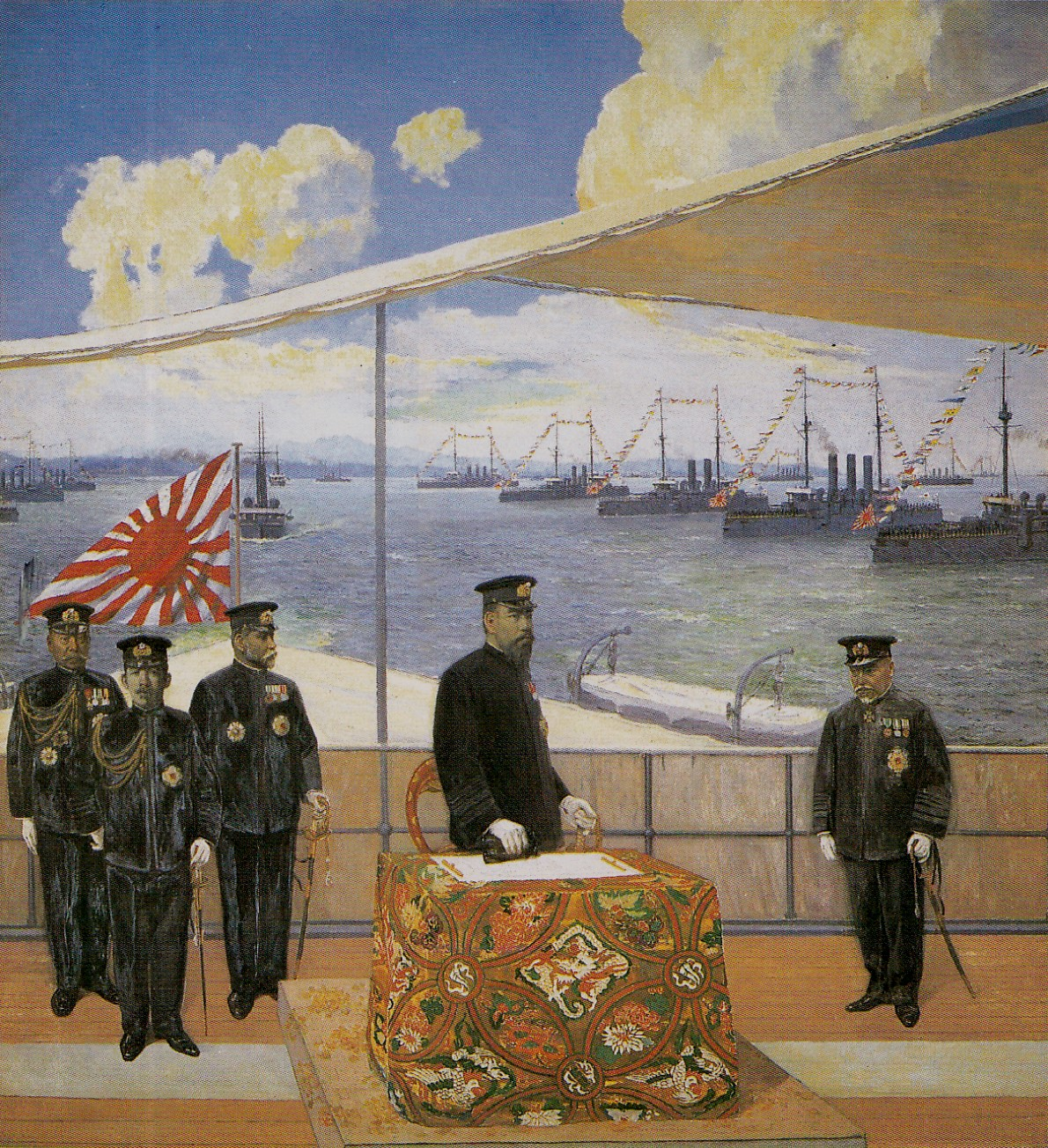
1929 painting by Tōjō Shōtarō of the review

- With Admiral Tōgō Heihachirō, Japan's Emperor Meiji reviewed 308 warships, mostly of the Imperial Japanese Navy but some Russian Navy ships captured in the Russo-Japanese War. The emperor and the admiral sailed between the lines of the docked vessels.
- Edwin Milton Royle's stage play, The Squaw Man, premiered on Broadway at Wallack's Theatre for the first of 222 performances.
- Born:
  - Felix Bloch, Swiss-born American physicist, 1952 Nobel Prize laureate and the first Director-General of CERN (d. 1983)
  - Yen Chia-kan (C. K. Yen), President of the Republic of China (Taiwan) from 1975 to 1978, Prime Minister 1963-1972; in Suzhou, Jiangsu province, Chinese Empire (d. 1993)
- Died:
  - Marcello Massarenti, 88, Italian art collector and former aide to Pope Pius IX
  - Florent Willems, 82, Belgian painter and art restorer

== October 24, 1905 (Tuesday) ==
- The U.S. Board of Ordnance and Fortification, a division of the U.S. War Department, rejected an October 19 offer by Wilbur Wright and Orville Wright to sell the technology of the Wright Flyer III airplane to the government, despite the airplane's proven ability to stay airborne for substantial periods of time. The government reply stated that the Board would take no further action "until a machine is produced which by actual operation is shown to be able to produce horizontal flight and to carry an operator."

== October 25, 1905 (Wednesday) ==
- The Staten Island Ferry was officially opened in New York City.
- The Protestant Federation of France was created by representatives of several regional unions of Lutheran, Reformed, Evangelical and Pentecostal churches.
- Count Leopold of Lippe-Biesterfeld was awarded the throne of the Principality of Lippe in Germany, after a German arbitration commission ruled in his favor on the question of a successor to Leopold's father, Prince Alexander, who had died on January 13. At the capital at Detmold, the Count took the regnal name of Prince Leopold IV for the tiny 470 square miles (1,200 km^{2}) principality, which would be abolished in 1918 after Germany's defeat in World War One.

== October 26, 1905 (Thursday) ==
The former Sweden-Norway naval flag

- The dissolution of the union between Norway and Sweden was completed with the signing of multiple treaties at Stockholm by representatives of the governments of both Sweden and of Norway, and by King Oscar II, who renounced all claims to the Norwegian throne on behalf of himself and his descendants.
- (October 13, O.S.) The Saint Petersburg Soviet held its first meeting, the first elected workers' Soviet (council) in Russia.
- Born: Louisette Bertholle, French cooking teacher and co-author (with Julia Child and Simone Beck) of Mastering the Art of French Cooking; in Paris (d. 1999)

== October 27, 1905 (Friday) ==
- Greek guerrillas burned down the buildings in the village of Avdella in the Pindus mountains, at the time under Ottoman Empire control, with a large settlement of Aromanians.
- Died:
  - Ralph Copeland, 68, Astronomer Royal for Scotland since 1889
  - Frederick Hutton, 68, English-born New Zealand biologist, author of catalogs of the birds, fish and mollusks of that nation's islands, died onboard the SS Rimutaka while on his way home from a visit to England. He was buried at sea off of the coast of South Africa.
  - Rudolf Lehmann, 86, German-English portrait painter and author

== October 28, 1905 (Saturday) ==
- After more than seven years of fighting in the Philippines at the island of Mindanao, the chief of the Moro insurgents, Datto Ali, was killed by a U.S. attack on his headquarters.
- The Prime Minister Christian Lundeberg of Sweden and his cabinet resigned after having concluded the settlement with Norway dissolving the union between the two nations.
- Died: General Mikhail Dragomirov, 74, Russian Governor-General of Kiev

== October 29, 1905 (Sunday) ==
- Elections were held in Switzerland for all 167 seats of the Federal Council. The Free Democratic Party won 104 seats, and the Catholic People's Party finished a distant second with 35.
- Born:
  - Albert E. Brumley, American hymn author known for composing "I'll Fly Away"; near Spiro, Oklahoma (d. 1977)
  - Giuseppe Alessi, Italian politician and president of the Sicilian Regional government 1947-1949 and 1955-1956, known for his co-operation with the Sicilian Mafia during the Cold War; in San Cataldo (d. 2009)
  - Reg Bunn, English comic book artist known for creating "The Spider" (d. 1971)
  - Berthold Wolpe, German-born British calligrapher, typographer and illustrator; in Offenbach am Main (d. 1989)
  - Frank Bompensiero, American Mafia hitman in the Los Angeles mob, known for carrying out at least five "hits"; in Milwaukee (murdered, 1977)
- Died: Hendrik Witbooi, 75, chief of the Khowesin clan of the Namibian Oorlam people, was killed in battle while leading the native resistance to German colonial rule in what is now Namibia. He would be celebrated as a Namibian national hero a century after his death, with his image on Namibia's currency.

== October 30, 1905 (Monday) ==
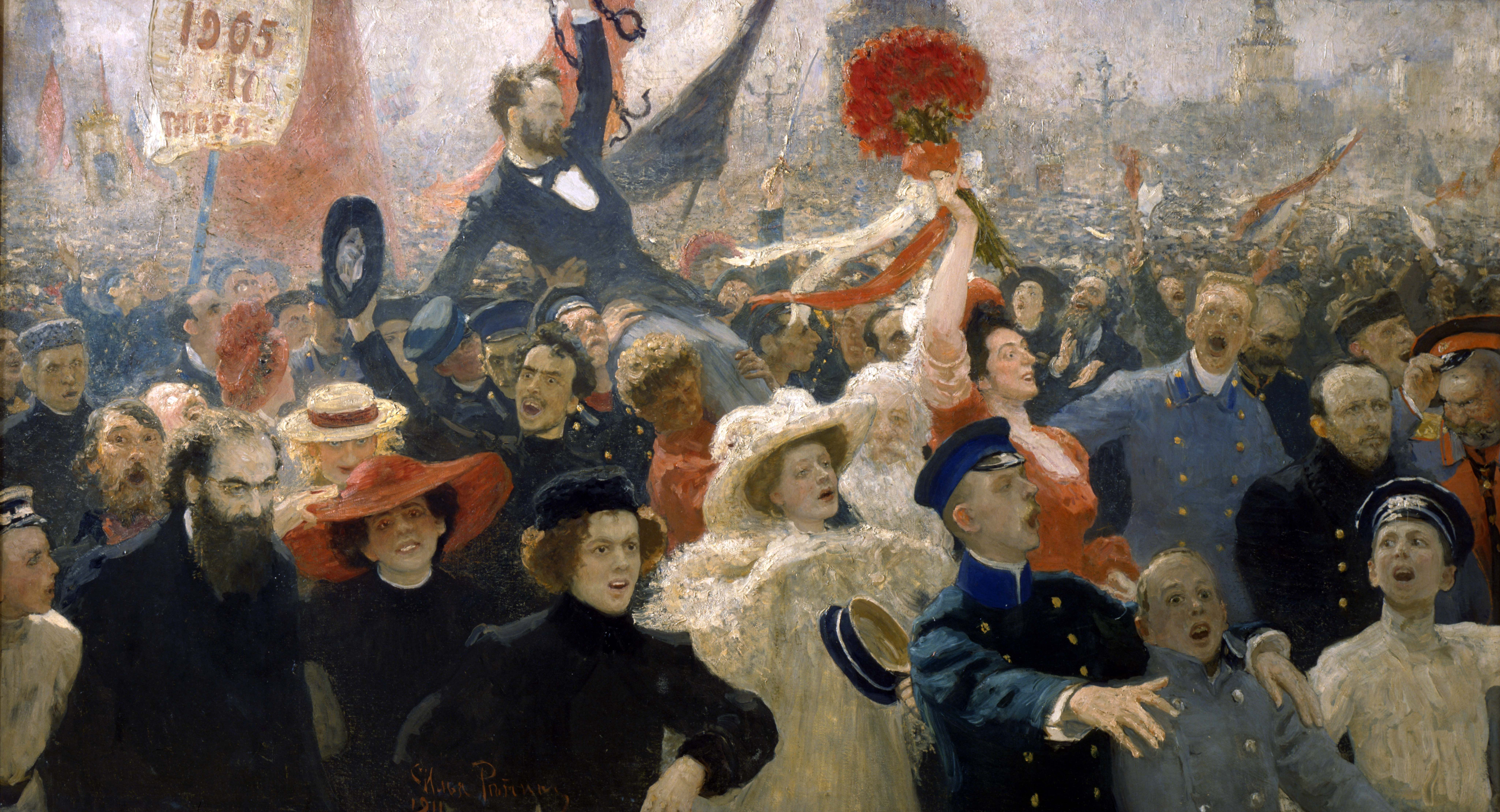
Ilya Repin's painting "17 October 1905"

- Tsar Nicholas II of Russia issued the October Manifesto, also referred to as the "Manifest 17 October" because the Julian calendar still in use at Russia had the "old style" date of October 17. The decree guaranteed civil liberties, extending voting rights, and providing more power to the Duma to have a say in the enforcement of royal decrees. Referring to himself in the plural, the Tsar began, "We, Nicholas the Second, by the Grace of God Emperor and Autocrat of All the Russias... declare to all our faithful subjects that the troubles and agitations in our capitals and in numerous other places fill our heart with excessive pain and sorrow," and then added, "The supreme duty imposed upon us by our sovereign office requires us to efface ourself and to use all the force and reason at our command... to assure the success of measures for pacification in all circles of public life, which are essential to the well being of our people. We, therefore, direct our government to carry out our inflexible will in the following manner..." the Tsar went on to guarantee "freedom of conscience, speech, union and association", to invite participation in the Duma to "those classes of the population now completely deprived of electoral rights", and finally "to establish as an unchangeable rule that no law shall be enforceable with out the approval of the State Duma."

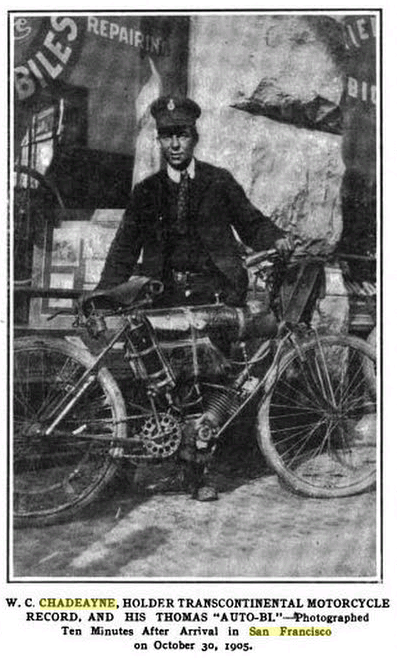
William Chadeayne at his arrival

- American motorcyclist William Chadeayne arrived in San Francisco, 47 days after his September 13 departure from New York City, setting a record by crossing North America by motor vehicle, four days faster than George A. Wyman's trip in 1903. At the time, most of the roads in the United States were difficult to traverse, with some described by Chadeayne later as "unspeakably vile seas of mud or oceans of sand."
- Twelve people were killed and 35 injured in the wreck of an Atchison, Topeka & Santa Fe Railway train.

== October 31, 1905 (Tuesday) ==
- Prince Nikola of Montenegro, faced with a potential uprising in his kingdom, announced that he would change the absolute monarchy and provide a constitution for his principality.
- Ali Pasha ibn Abd Allah, Emir of the Hejaz in what is now Saudi Arabia, was appointed as the Sharif of Mecca, spiritual leader of Islam.
- A second New York performance of George Bernard Shaw's play, Mrs. Warren's Profession, was canceled by order of the New York City Police Department. NYPD Commissioner William McAdoo had watched the New York premiere at the Garrick Theatre the night before and pronounced the play to be "revolting, indecent, and nauseating where it was not boring." Theater manager Samuel W. Gumperts was arrested, and warrants were issued for the actors and actresses.
- The short-lived Markovo Republic was proclaimed by peasants who had taken control of the Volokolamsky District 80 miles (130 km) northwest of Moscow.
- Born:
  - Elizabeth Jenkins, English novelist and biographer; in Hitchin, Hertfordshire (d. 2010)
  - Harry Harlow, American psychologist known for his controversial experiments with study of rhesus monkeys; in Fairfield, Iowa (d. 1981)
  - Ellsworth "Bumpy" Johnson, African-American crime boss of the mob in New York City's Harlem section; in Charleston, South Carolina (d. of a heart attack, 1968)
