= July 1905 =

Month of 1905

<<	July 1905					>>
Su	Mo	Tu	We	Th	Fr	Sa
						1
2	3	4	5	6	7	8
9	10	11	12	13	14	15
16	17	18	19	20	21	22
23	24	25	26	27	28	29
30	31

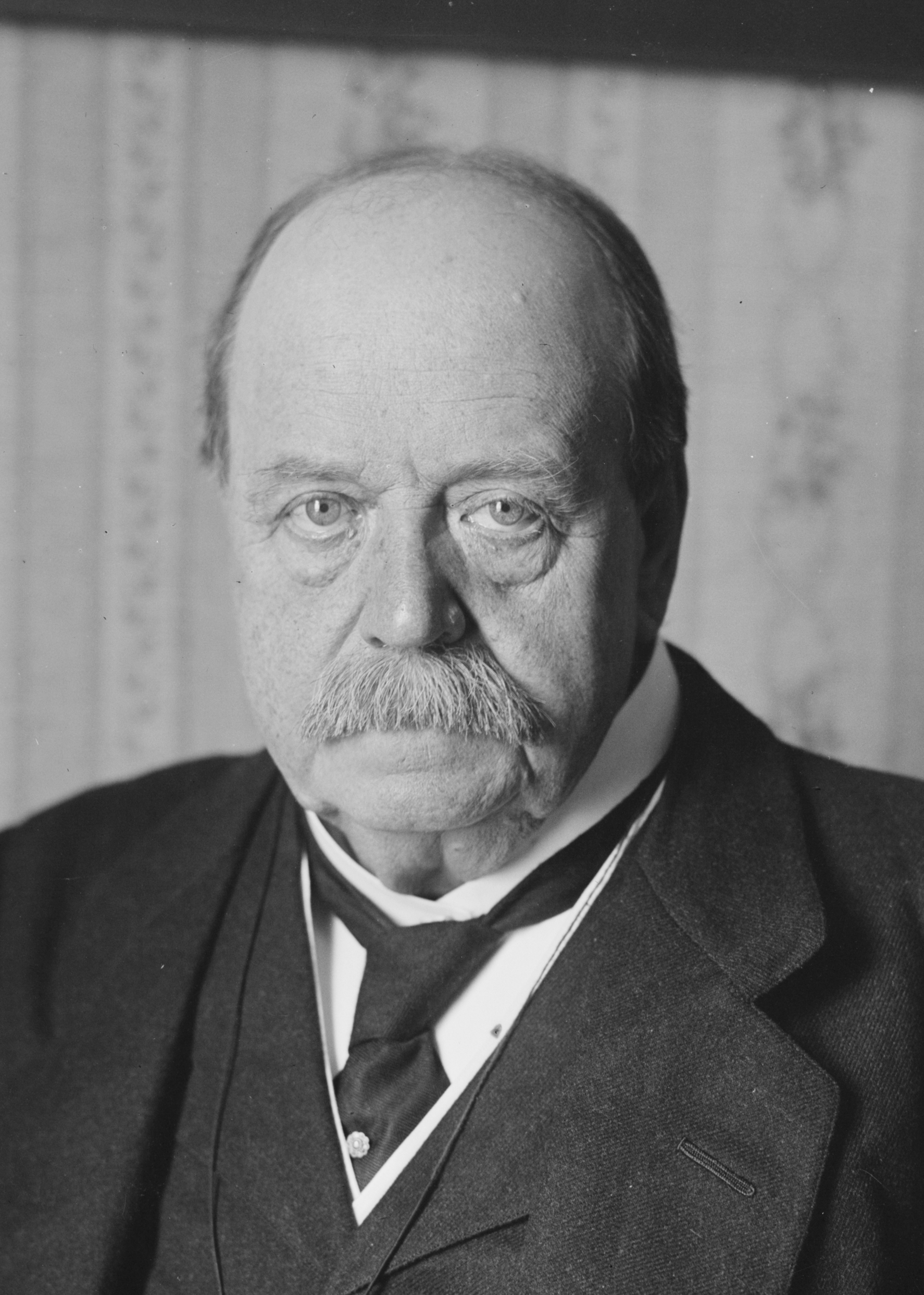
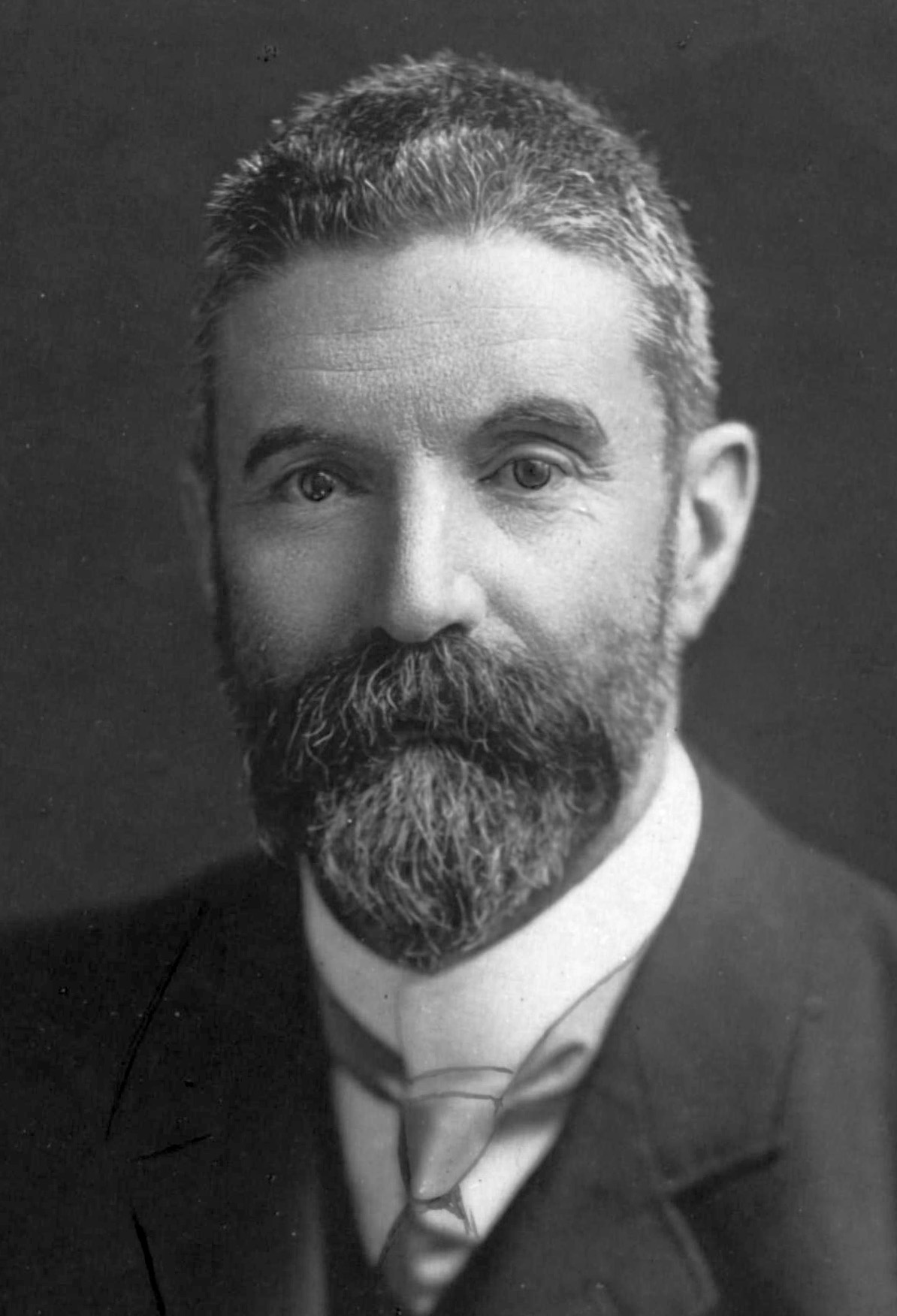
July 5, 1905: Australian PM George Reid replaced by Alfred Deakin
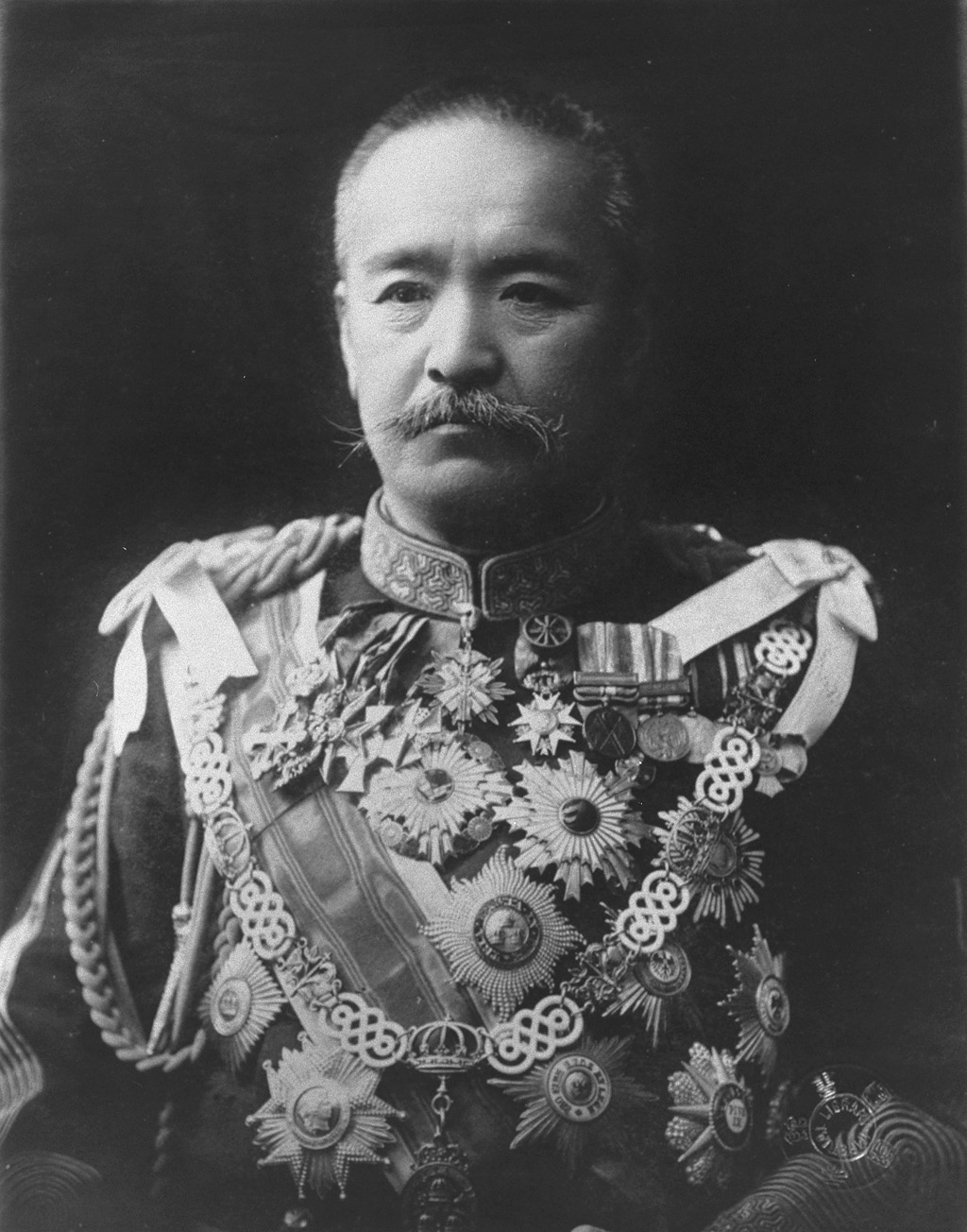
July 27, 1905: U.S. Secretary Taft and Japan's Prime Minister Katsura reach agreement

== July 1, 1905 (Saturday) ==
- Hundreds of people died in the flooding of the Mexican state of Guanajuato.
- A federal grand jury in Chicago indicted five corporations and 17 people for violations of the Sherman Act after charges were brought by the U.S. Department of Justice in an antitrust prosecution.
- China's government ordered all provincial governors and viceroys to put a stop to anti-American protests.
- Charles J. Bonaparte (the great-nephew of Napoleon Bonaparte) became the new U.S. Secretary of the Navy.
- Died: U.S. Secretary of State John Hay died suddenly. Funeral services were conducted on July 5 with President Theodore Roosevelt and Vice President Charles Fairbanks attending. To succeed Hay, Roosevelt appointed Elihu Root, who was confirmed and took office on July 19.

== July 2, 1905 (Sunday) ==
- The Imperial Russian Navy's Black Sea Fleet returned to Sevastopol after having been unable to capture or sink the battleship Potemkin, and the ships were disabled.
- Philadelphia police arrested almost 2,000 people in a raid on gambling houses and "disorderly resorts".

== July 3, 1905 (Monday) ==
- France's Chamber of Deputies passed the bill for separation of church and state, 341 to 233.
- Born: Clorinda Málaga de Prado, First Lady of Peru from 1958 to 1962; in Lima (d. 1993)

== July 4, 1905 (Tuesday) ==
- The Abgeordnetenhaus, lower house of Austria's parliament voted down a motion to prepare for a separation of Hungary from the Austro-Hungarian Empire.
- The U.S. Department of Agriculture announced more than 1,200 civil lawsuits against American railroad companies for violation of federal laws regarding transportation of livestock.
- Born:
  - Lionel Trilling, American literary critic, short story writer, essayist and teacher; in Queens, New York (d. 1975)
  - Clorinda Málaga de Prado, First Lady of Peru from 1958 to 1962; in Lima (d. 1993)
- Died: Élisée Reclus, 75, French geographer and anarchist

== July 5, 1905 (Wednesday) ==
- Alfred Deakin of the Protectionist Party returned to office as the Prime Minister of Australia after the resignation of George Reid of the Free Trade Party and his coalition government.
- Born: Horace "Jock" Cameron, South African cricketer and wicket-keeper; in Port Elizabeth, Cape Colony (died of typhoid, 1935)

== July 6, 1905 (Thursday) ==
- The remains of John Paul Jones were turned over to U.S. Navy officials in Paris, and a special squadron departed from Cherbourg on July 8 to send the remains to the U.S.
- Born: Leonid Pavlovich Potapov, Russian ethnographer specializing in the study of peoples of southern Siberia; in Barnaul, Tomsk Governorate, Russian Empire (d. 2000)

== July 7, 1905 (Friday) ==
- U.S. President Theodore Roosevelt delivered a speech to 60,000 people at the National Educational Association convention at Asbury Park, New Jersey.

== July 8, 1905 (Saturday) ==
- U.S. President Roosevelt sent his 21-year-old daughter, Alice Roosevelt Longworth, and her party on a diplomatic journey to Japan, the Philippines, Hong Kong, China and Korea.
- France accepted Germany's terms for a conference at Tangier to resolve their dispute in Morocco.
- Born: Leonid Amalrik, Russian film studio animator; in Moscow (d. 1997)
- Died:
  - Guy Bradley, 35, American game warden and deputy sheriff, was shot and killed by two suspected poachers near Flamingo, Monroe County, Florida.
  - Walter Kittredge, 70, American musician and songwriter known for the military song "Tenting on the Old Camp Ground"

== July 9, 1905 (Sunday) ==
- Romania returned the battleship Potemkin to the Imperial Russian Navy the day after the mutineering crew had been granted asylum at the Black Sea port of Constanța.

== July 10, 1905 (Monday) ==
- A Japanese expedition took control of the Russian island of Sakhalin after a short battle. Before retreating, the Russian Navy commander burned the government buildings and destroyed the coast defense guns, as well as destroying much of the Russian administrative buildings at Korsakov.
- Field Marshal Lord Roberts declared in a speech at the House of Lords that the British Army was totally unfit for war and called for conscription of additional young men into the service.
- Portsmouth, New Hampshire was agreed upon by the U.S., Japan and Russia to negotiate the terms of the treaty to end the Russo-Japanese War.
- Born: Thomas Gomez (Sabino Tomás Gómez, Jr.), American stage and film actor known for Ride the Pink Horse; in New York City (d. 1971)

== July 11, 1905 (Tuesday) ==
- Major General Pavel Pavlovich Shuvalov, chief of police operations in Moscow, was assassinated.
- An explosion killed 119 coal miners at the United National Colliers Company at Wattstown in Wales.
- Born:
  - Kikutaro Baba, Japanese expert on mollusks who identified over 100 species and for whom at least 11 species are named, including Cyerce kikutarobabai; in Fukuoka (d. 2001)
  - Betty Allan, Australian statistician and biometrician; in St Kilda, Victoria (d. 1952)
- Died: Muhammad Abduh, 56, Islamic scholar and the Grand Mufti of Egypt since 1899

== July 12, 1905 (Wednesday) ==
- The University of Sheffield, an amalgamation of Firth College, the Medical Institution and the Technical School, was officially opened by King Edward VII in England.
- The first World Congress of the Baptist Church ended with the founding of the Baptist World Alliance.
- Born: Prince John of the United Kingdom, youngest child of King George V; at Sandringham, Norfolk (died of epileptic seizure, 1919)

== July 13, 1905 (Thursday) ==
- Britain's Prime Minister Balfour declared that he was opposed to using the draft to increase the strength of the British Army.
- Born:
  - General Alfredo M. Santos, Chief of Staff of the Armed Forces of the Philippines from 1962 to 1965; in Santa Cruz (d. 1990)
  - Magda Foy, American child actress known as "The Solax Kid" for her many films for the Solax Studio; in New York City (d. 2000)

== July 14, 1905 (Friday) ==
- The government of France instituted France's first government assistance program for elderly and disabled persons.
- Orville Wright suffered minor injuries in a test-flight of the Wright Brothers' new Wright Flyer III airplane, prompting them to begin a major redesign of the aircraft.
- The first known suicide attack by a civilian (as opposed to sacrifices made in military combat) took place when a New Zealand farmer, Joseph Sewell, walked into a courtroom in Murchison (where he was the defendant in a civil lawsuit) and announced that he intended to detonate dynamite sticks strapped to his body. Sewell was ushered from the courtroom to the street and set off the dynamite after a police officer (who survived the blast) attempted to arrest him.
- Born: Laurence Chisholm Young, German-born British mathematician known for the Young measure in mathematical analysis; in Göttingen (d. 2000)

== July 15, 1905 (Saturday) ==
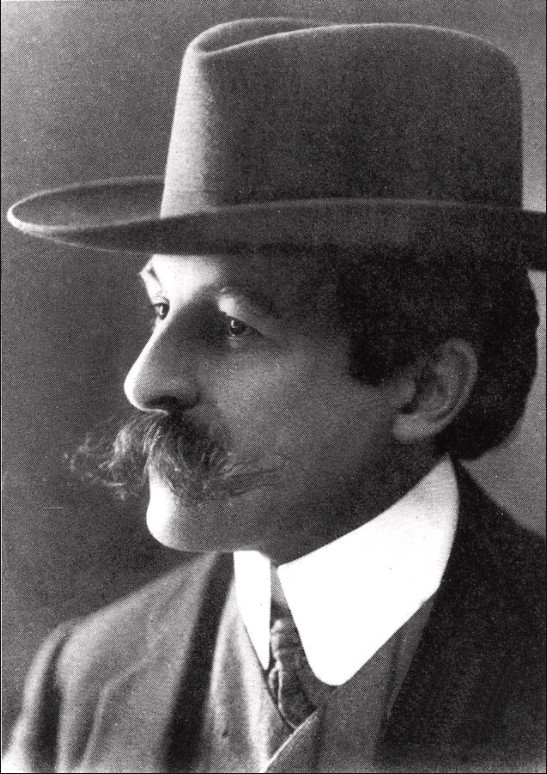
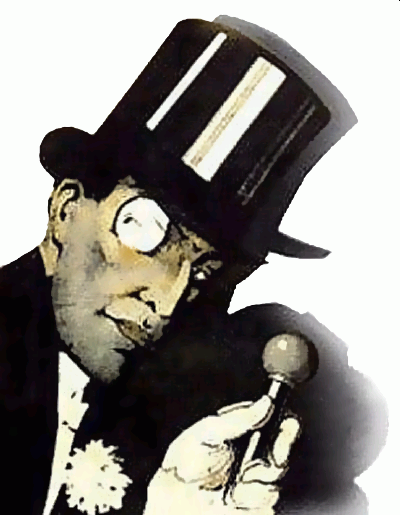
Leblanc and his popular character, Lupin
- The popular fictional character Arsène Lupin, the gentleman thief, was introduced in France. Created by French writer Maurice Leblanc, the first Lupin story appeared in the magazine Je sais tout, with the publication of the story ""The Arrest of Arsène Lupin" ("L'Arrestation d'Arsène Lupin"). Lupin went on to be featured in 17 novels and 39 short novels, and has been featured in plays, films and several television series.
- Born: Dorothy Fields, American songwriter known for "Big Spender"; in Allenhurst, New Jersey (d. 1988)
- Died: Raimundo Fernández-Villaverde, 57, Prime Minister of Spain in 1903 and in 1905

== July 16, 1905 (Sunday) ==
- Ottoman Empire forces, led by General Ahmed Fayzi Pasha, began a three-pronged attack on Yemen, capturing Sana'a on August 30.

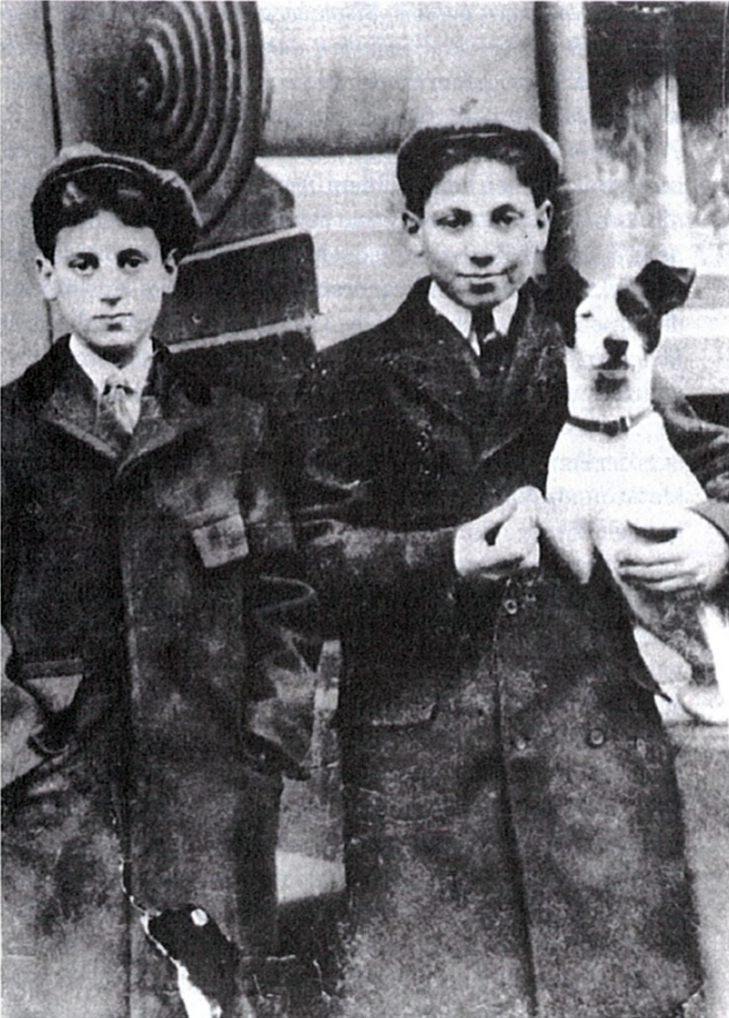
Julius Marx (left) at age 12

- Aged 14, Julius Henry Marx made his show business debut, appearing as a boy singer with the Gene Leroy Trio at the Ramona Theater in Grand Rapids, Michigan as part of a vaudeville act. He would later become famous as comedian Groucho Marx.

== July 17, 1905 (Monday) ==
- Ali Pasha ibn Abd Allah became the new Emir of the Hejaz in what is now Saudi Arabia, upon the death of his uncle, Sharif Awn ar-Rafiq. Ali Pasha would be appointed Sharif of Mecca on October 31, 1905.
- Born: William Gargan, American radio and TV actor who starred on the series Martin Kane, Private Eye; in Brooklyn (d. 1979)

== July 18, 1905 (Tuesday) ==
- The Liberal Party of Hungary, the opposition party in the Képviselőház, Hungary's lower house of parliament, voted to issue a manifesto urging Hungarians to refuse to obey orders of the incumbent government.
- Died: Daniel J. Maloney, 26, American aviator, was killed while demonstrating John J. Montgomery's Montgomery Glider in the skies over Santa Clara College in San Jose, California. After the glider was released from a balloon, Maloney was guiding it when the aircraft began falling apart, and both he and the aircraft plummeted from an altitude of 2,000 feet (610 m).

== July 19, 1905 (Wednesday) ==
- The Congress of Russian Zemstvos opened at Moscow, to make plans for setting the form of the Duma, Russia's first national assembly.

== July 20, 1905 (Thursday) ==
- The British House of Commons narrowly voted a resolution of no confidence in the government of Prime Minister Balfour, by a majority of three votes. Balfour announced on July 24 that he would not resign.

== July 21, 1905 (Friday) ==
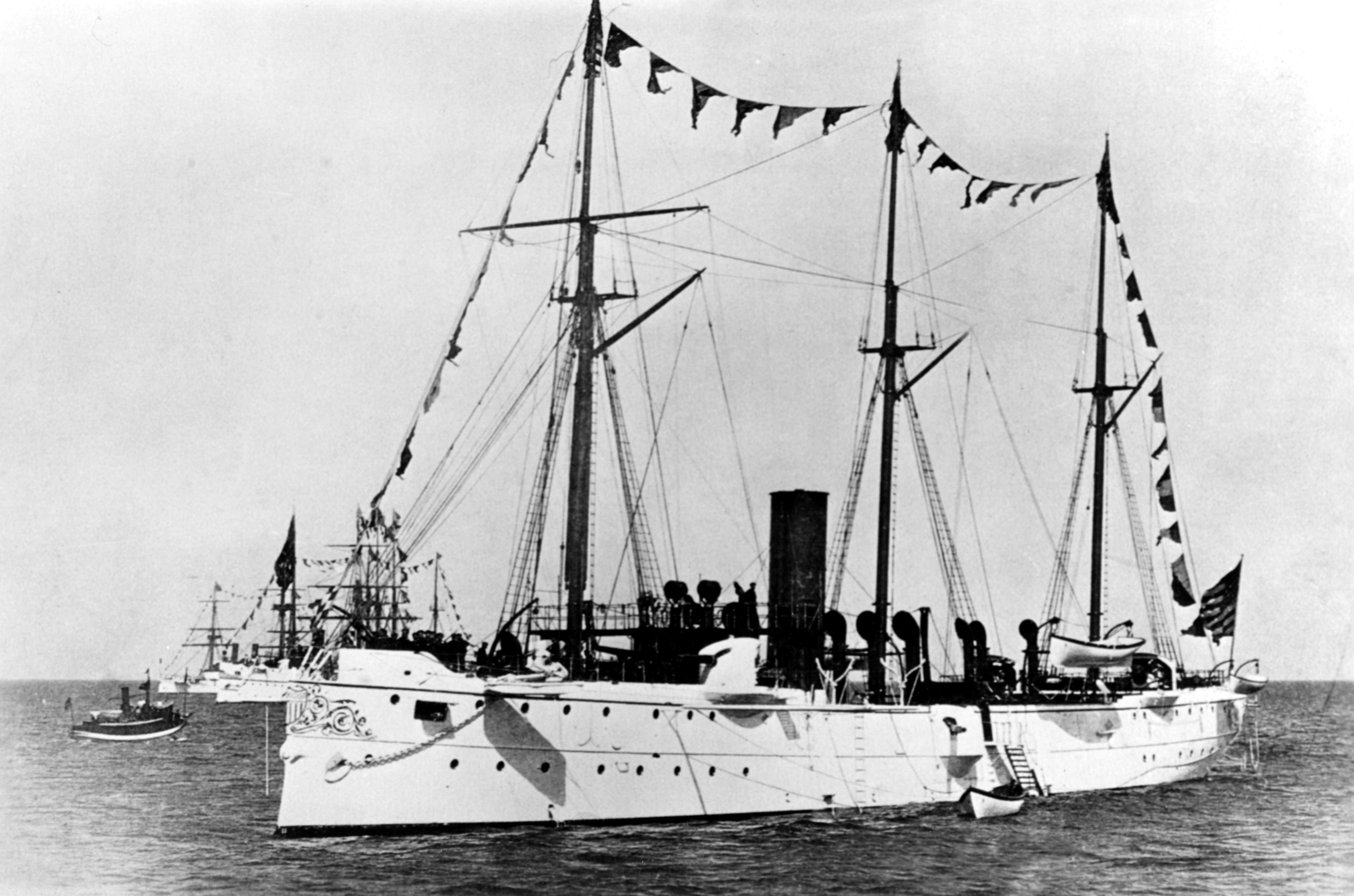
USS Bennington

- Sixty-six members of the crew of the USS Bennington were killed in an explosion of the U.S. Navy gunboat in the harbor at San Diego.
- An attempt to assassinate Abdul Hamid II, Sultan of the Ottoman Empire, was unsuccessful after a bomb was thrown at him and he escaped, uninjured.
- The Russian chief of police forces in Russia's Grand Duchy of Finland was assassinated in Helsingfors.
- Born: Diana Trilling, American literary critic, author (d. 1996)

== July 22, 1905 (Saturday) ==
- Florence Kelly delivered a landmark speech about child labor before the convention of the National American Woman Suffrage Association in Philadelphia.

== July 23, 1905 (Sunday) ==
- Tsar Nicholas II of Russia and Kaiser Wilhelm II of Germany met for a conference in Finland in the city of Borgå.
- Born: Leopold Engleitner, Austrian holocaust survivor (d. 2013)

== July 24, 1905 (Monday) ==
- An 8.3 magnitude earthquake struck Mongolia, the second-largest on record there, but caused no significant damage.

== July 25, 1905 (Tuesday) ==
- Johan Ramstedt, Prime Minister of Sweden, resigned along with his cabinet of ministers resigned after the rejection of a bill to negotiate the terms of dissolution of the United Kingdoms of Sweden and Norway.
- Born:
  - Elias Canetti, Bulgarian-born British writer; in Ruse (d. 1994)
  - Masazō Nonaka, Japanese supercentenarian who was the oldest man in the world in the year before his death aged 113; on Hokkaido (d. 2019)
  - Denys Watkins-Pitchford, British writer of children's books; in Lamport, Northamptonshire (d. 1990)

== July 26, 1905 (Wednesday) ==
- The British House of Commons rejected a bill that would have limited the length of parliament to no more than five years.
- Born: Alex Radcliffe, American baseball player and Negro American League star; in Mobile, Alabama (d. 1983)

== July 27, 1905 (Thursday) ==
- The Taft–Katsura agreement was reached in Tokyo between U.S. Secretary of State (and future U.S. president) William Howard Taft, and Japan's Prime Minister, Count Katsura Tarō, to discuss their respective positions regarding Korea and the Philippines. Though no formal agreement was signed, the U.S. agreed to Korea becoming a protectorate of Japan, in return for Japan's recognition of U.S. jurisdiction over the Philippines.
- Japan's new ambassador to the U.S., Baron Komura Jutarō, along with Foreign Minister Takahira Kogorō, met with U.S. President Roosevelt at Sagamore Hill, his home in Oyster Bay on Long Island in New York.
- Russian security police seized all documents relating to the recently ended Congress of Zemstvos.
- Twenty people were killed in the derailment of a Lancashire and Yorkshire Railway train near Liverpool.

== July 28, 1905 (Friday) ==
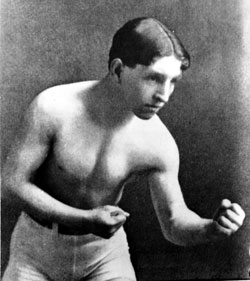
Frankie Neil

- Frankie Neil became the new world bantamweight boxing champion by defeating title holder Harry Tenny in a 25-round bout at Colma, California.
- Died: María Cabrales, Cuban activist, revolutionary and nurse

== July 29, 1905 (Saturday) ==
- In California, the government of the City of Los Angeles announced plans to build an aqueduct to bring water from the Owens River to adequately supply the city's residents. The Los Angeles Aqueduct would become operational in 1913 and transform the city into the second largest metropolis into the United States within less than a century.
- Born:
  - Clara Bow, American film actress known as "The 'It' Girl"; in Brooklyn (d. 1965)
  - Dag Hammarskjöld, Swedish diplomat and Secretary-General of the United Nations from 1953 until his death (killed in plane crash, 1961)

== July 30, 1905 (Sunday) ==
- At Basel in Switzerland, the World Zionist Congress delegates voted to reject the British offer of land in Uganda for a Jewish homeland in Africa.

== July 31, 1905 (Monday) ==
- Japan completed its conquest of Russia's island of Sakhalin with the surrender of the remaining Russian garrison of 3,200 men and 70 officers commanded by Governor Mikhail Lyapunov. The two nations would later agree to divide Sakhalin as part of the Portsmouth treaty.
- Japan secured a commitment from the Korean Empire to open the three Korean ports to international trade.
