= August 1905 =

Month of 1905

<<	August 1905					>>
Su	Mo	Tu	We	Th	Fr	Sa
		1	2	3	4	5
6	7	8	9	10	11	12
13	14	15	16	17	18	19
20	21	22	23	24	25	26
27	28	29	30	31

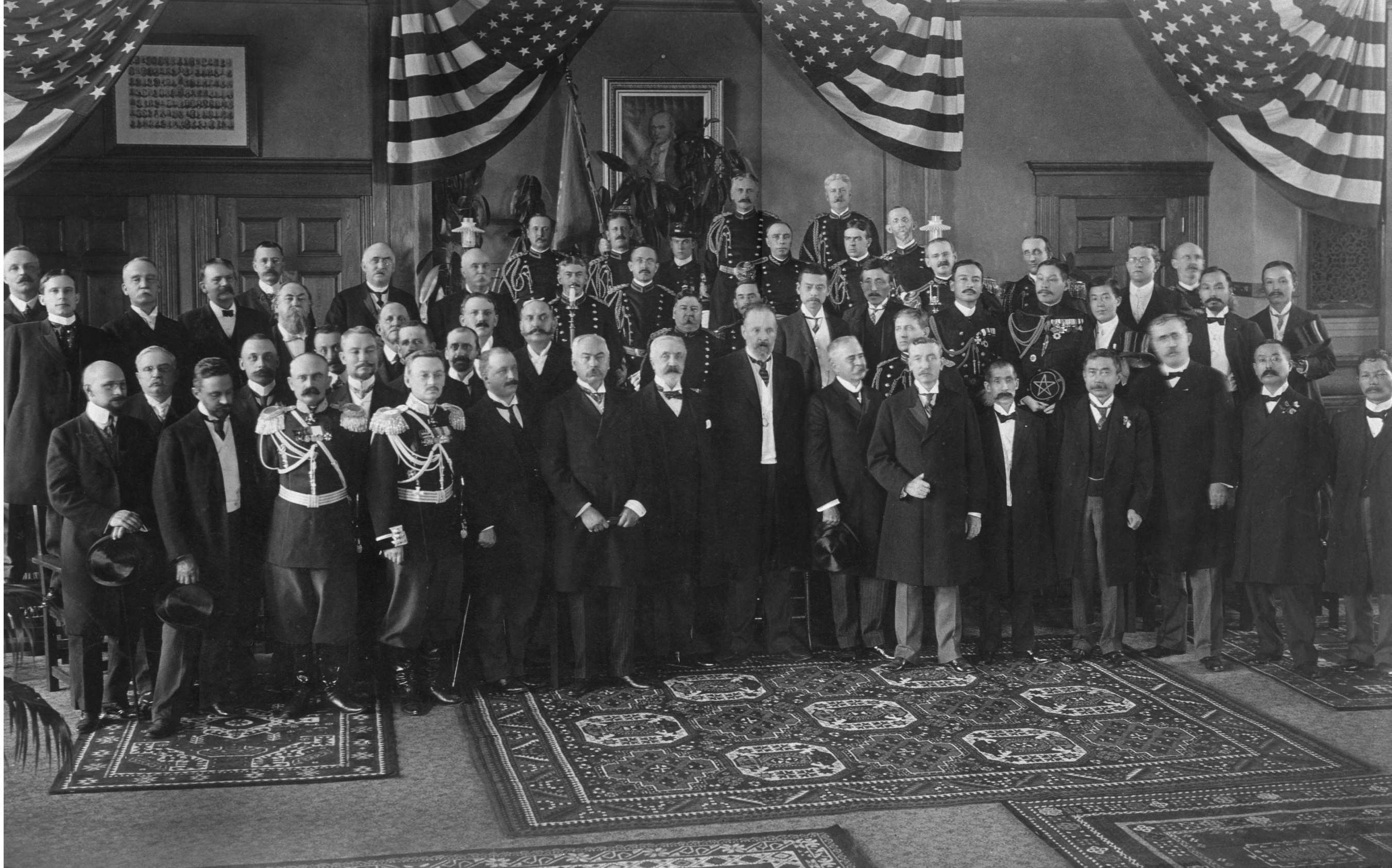
August 9, 1905: Russian and Japanese delegates open peace negotiations in U.S. at Portsmouth, New Hampshire

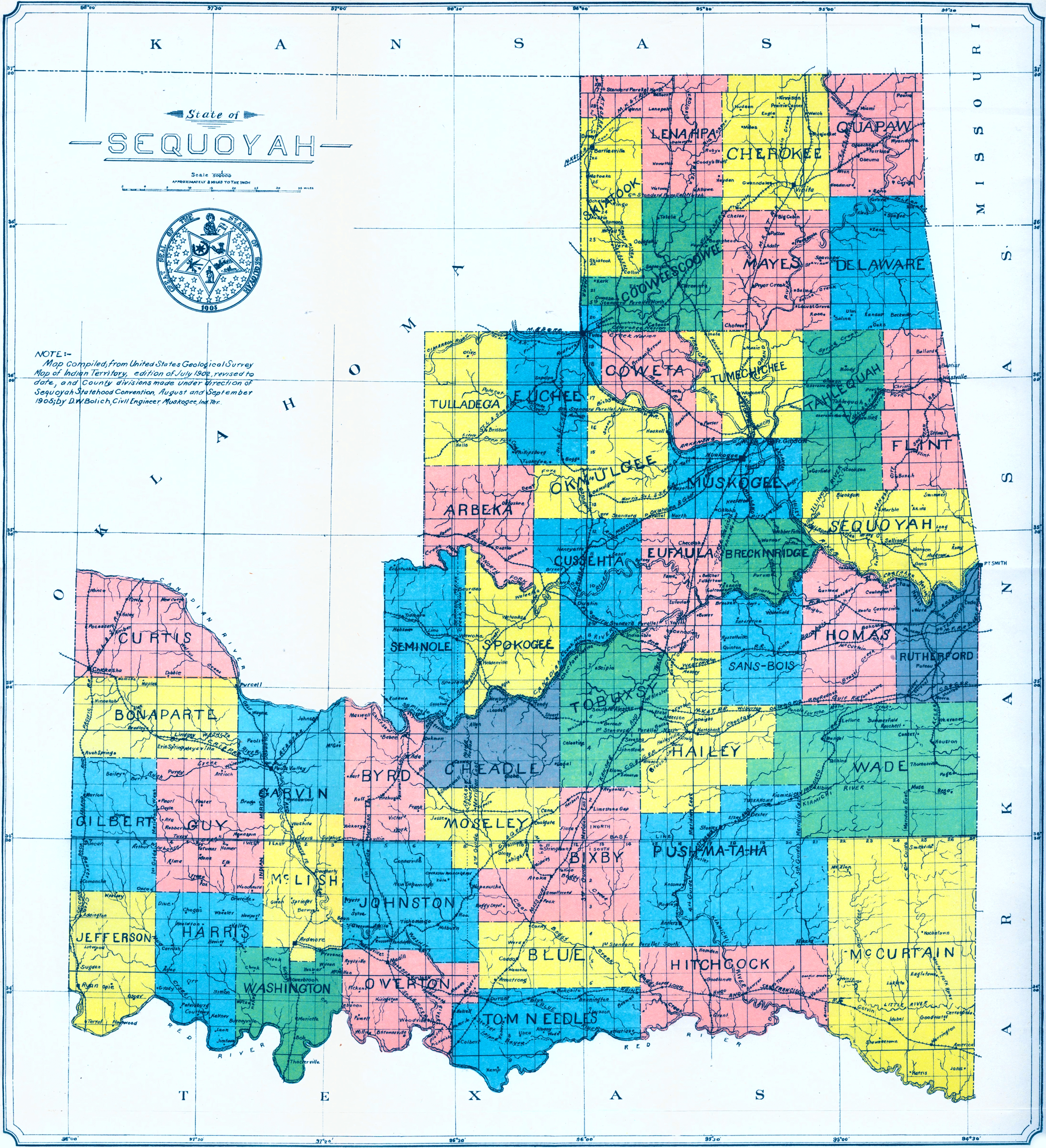
Indian tribal delegates approve constitution for proposed 46th U.S. state, Sequoyah

== August 1, 1905 (Tuesday) ==
- Japan established its own government on the recently captured Russian island of Sakhalin.
- Tsar Nicholas II of Russia held a council of the grand dukes, cabinet ministers, and other officials to make plans to create the Duma, Russia's first representative legislature.

== August 2, 1905 (Wednesday) ==
- Businessman and right-wing politician Christian Lundeberg became Prime Minister of Sweden.
- The Ancient Order of Druids initiated neo-Druidic rituals at Stonehenge in England.
- Born:
  - Myrna Loy, American film, television and stage actress known for portraying Nora Charles in the series of The Thin Man films; as Myrna Adele Williams in Helena, Montana (d. 1993)
  - Ruth Nelson, American stage and film actress; in Saginaw, Michigan (d. 1992)

== August 3, 1905 (Thursday) ==
- The Governor of Louisiana ordered the state naval reserve to seize two U.S. Coast Guard cutters outside of New Orleans. The ships had been directed to enforce a quarantine against people leaving the state during a yellow fever epidemic. One cutter was seized the next day, while the other sailed away.

== August 4, 1905 (Friday) ==
- Japanese warships appeared off of the coast of the Russian Empire's easternmost city, Vladivostok.
- Born: Abeid Karume, President of Zanzibar who overthrow the Sultan in 1964 and then united his nation with Tanganyika to form Tanzania; in Mwera on the island of Zanzibar (assassinated 1972)
- Died:
  - Walther Flemming, 62, German biologist and founder of cytogenetics
  - Kinjikitile Ngwale, Tanganyikan Matumbi spiritual medium who led a rebellion against the German administration for German East Africa, was hanged for treason

== August 5, 1905 (Saturday) ==
- The peace conference representatives of Russia and Japan met for the first time as the guests of U.S. President Theodore Roosevelt at his home in Oyster Bay, New York. From there, they sailed on U.S. Navy ships for the meeting site at Portsmouth, New Hampshire. The peace envoys of Russia and Japan arrived on August 8, where they were welcomed by the Governor of New Hampshire.

== August 6, 1905 (Sunday) ==
- In a gunbattle in New York City's Chinatown section, three Chinese residents were shot dead and several others severely injured.

== August 7, 1905 (Monday) ==
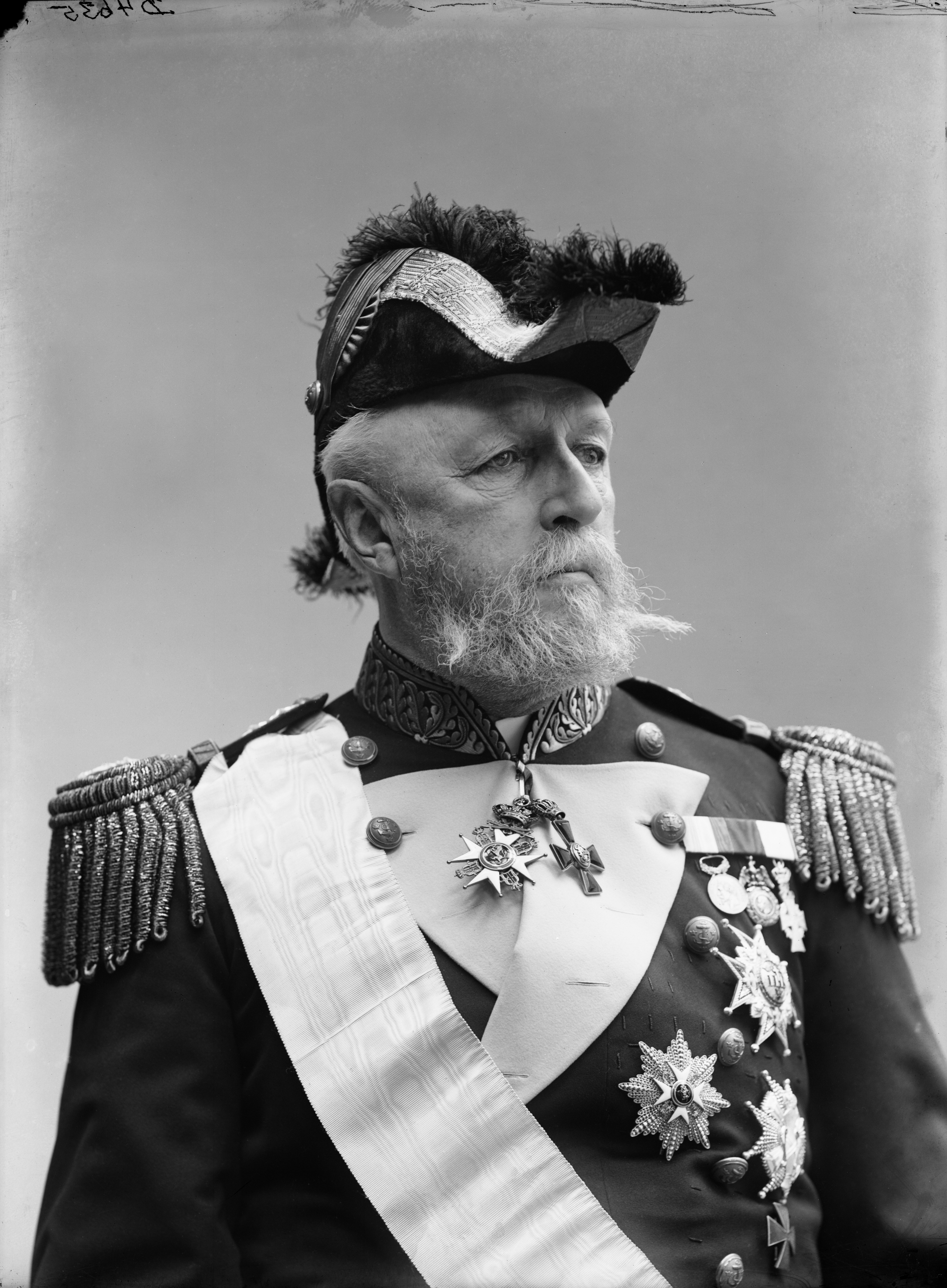
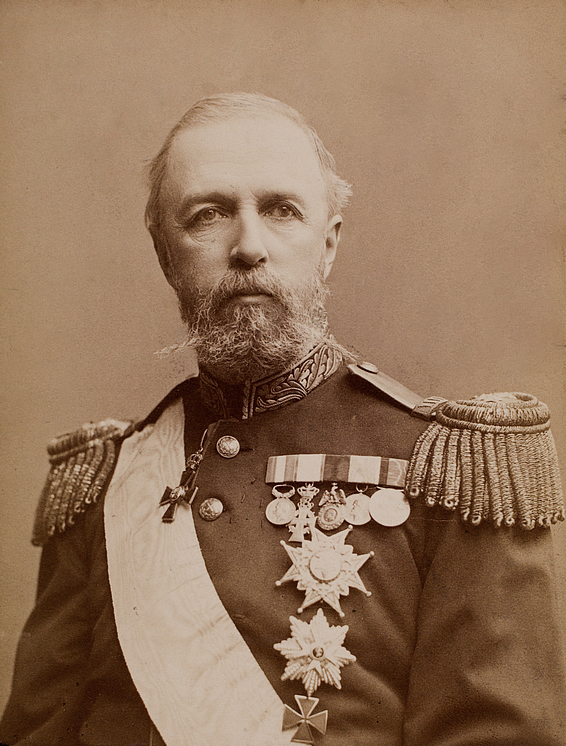
King Oscar and Crown Prince Gustaf
- King Oscar II of Sweden appointed Gustaf V to serve as his regent.
- Surgeons with the U.S. Marine Hospital Service entered New Orleans to take charge of preventing the spread of yellow fever.
- A crowd of 20,000 Finnish people under the administration of the Russian Empire gathered at Helsingfors (Helsinki) to demand sweeping changes in the Grand Duchy of Finland.
- Died: Alexander Melville Bell, 86, Scottish-born American linguist and elocutionist who developed the "Visible Speech" system in 1867 to aid persons born deaf to in speaking; father of Alexander Graham Bell

== August 8, 1905 (Tuesday) ==
- Fourteen employees of a department store in Albany, New York were killed when the building collapsed suddenly.
- Born: André Jolivet, French composer; in Paris (d. 1974)

== August 9, 1905 (Wednesday) ==
- The peace conference between Russia and Japan began at Portsmouth. The next day, Japan presented its terms for peace and the Russian representatives telegraphed the information to Tsar Nicholas.
- Born: Leo Genn, English stage, film, TV and radio actor; in London (d. 1978)

== August 10, 1905 (Thursday) ==
- U.S. President Roosevelt addressed a large crowd of mining union members at Wilkes-Barre, Pennsylvania.

== August 11, 1905 (Friday) ==
- The Russian Council appointed by Tsar Nicholas II met at Peterhoff and approved a plan for a national Duma, the first representative assembly in the Empire.

== August 12, 1905 (Saturday) ==
- Russia's Tsar sent his counterproposal to Japan regarding peace conditions, and the conference began to consider the 12-point agenda. The Russians agreed to three of the 12 conditions on August 14, and two more on August 15.
- Leopold II of Belgium opened the Antwerpen-Central railway station.
- The first running took place of the Shelsley Walsh Speed Hill Climb in England, the world's oldest motorsport event to be staged continuously on its original course.

== August 13, 1905 (Sunday) ==
- At a referendum in Norway, voters opted almost unanimously for dissolution of the union with Sweden.
- In Canada, an Indian village near Ashcroft, British Columbia, was swept away by a flash flood of the Thompson River caused by a landslide.
- A train collision on the New York City and St. Louis Railroad killed 12 people near Vermillion, Ohio.
- Born: Gareth Jones, Welsh journalist and foreign correspondent; in Barry, Vale of Glamorgan (d. 1935)

== August 14, 1905 (Monday) ==
- Judge Frank Plumley, the American arbitrator of France's claims against Venezuela, allowed $636,212 of more than eight million dollars' worth of demands.
- Polish novelist Henryk Sienkiewicz was sentenced to house arrest indefinitely after being convicted of signing and publishing a manifesto protesting the Russification of schools within the Governorate of Warsaw.
- Died: Simeon Solomon, 64, controversial British painter who achieved posthumous fame

== August 15, 1905 (Tuesday) ==
- Mexican-American prospector Pablo Valencia got lost in the Sonoran Desert of Arizona with no water. Enduring almost eight days of dehydration, Valencia wandered until he was discovered on August 23 by anthropologist William J. McGee and McGee's Papago Indian assistant, Jose. McGee would later recount Valencia's ordeal in a paper, "Desert Thirst as Disease".
- Japanese troops landed on Russian soil, coming ashore at Siberia after crossing the Strait of Tartary.

== August 16, 1905 (Wednesday) ==
- The Sultan of Morocco refused the French ministers demands for the release of an Algerian chief, as well as for indemnity for French financial losses.
- Born: Marian Rejewski, Polish mathematician and cryptologist who reconstructed Germany's Enigma machine during World War II (d. 1980)
- Died: Lyman Hall, 46, President of Georgia Tech since 1896

== August 17, 1905 (Thursday) ==
- Negotiations between Russia and Japan broke down over disagreements with the remaining seven Japanese conditions for peace. The conference adjourned the next day, but agreed to meet again on August 22.

== August 18, 1905 (Friday) ==
- Russian Tsar Nicholas II proclaimed the creation of the Russia's first representative assembly, to be selected by indirect vote.

== August 19, 1905 (Saturday) ==
- President Roosevelt invited one of the Russian peace envoys, Baron Rosen, to discuss with him the necessity to make peace.

== August 20, 1905 (Sunday) ==
- Chinese revolutionary leader Sun Yat-sen formed the first chapter of Tongmenghui, a union of all secret societies determined to bringing down the Manchu dynasty.
- Lord Curzon resigned as Viceroy of India, and the Earl of Minto was appointed as his successor.
- Born:
  - Jean Gebser, German-born Swiss philosopher; in Posen, German Empire (now Poznan in Poland) (d. 1973)
  - Mikio Naruse, Japanese filmmaker; in Tokyo (d. 1969)
- Died: Canadian Senator David Wark, 101, the longest-lived legislator in the world, Senator for the province of New Brunswick for 38 years since the founding of the Dominion of Canada in 1867

== August 21, 1905 (Monday) ==
- The Sequoyah Constitutional Convention took place in Muskogee in the U.S. Indian Territory and approved a constitution for the proposed State of Sequoyah, seeking admission as the only Native American majority state in the U.S. Delegates from the Creek, Cherokee, Chickasaw, Choctaw and Seminole nations drafted the document, which was approved overwhelmingly in a November 7 referendum. Instead, President Roosevelt proposed the joining of the Indian Territory with the white-ruled Oklahoma Territory, and the Oklahoma Enabling Act would unify the two territories effective June 16, 1906, with Oklahoma admitted as the 46th U.S. state on November 16, 1907.
- Died: Mary Mapes Dodge, 74, American children's author known for the novel Hans Brinker, or The Silver Skates

== August 22, 1905 (Tuesday) ==
- The sinking of the Japanese ferry Kinjo Maru killed 160 people after the British ship HMS Baralong collided with it in the Sea of Japan off of the coast of Shimishima.
- Born: Johan Lyng, Norwegian politician who briefly served as Prime Minister of Norway in 1963; in Trondheim (d. 1978)

== August 23, 1905 (Wednesday) ==
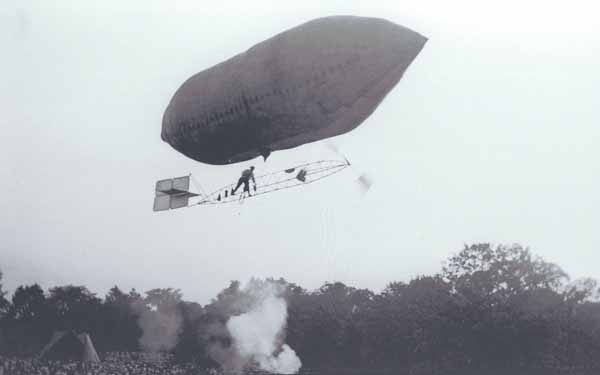
Knabenshue on his dirigible (in Toledo, Ohio)

- A. Roy Knabenshue introduced the dirigible to the skies of New York City, piloting the lighter-than-air vehicle within view of hundreds of hundreds of thousands of spectators. The airship lifted off from Central Park at 2:12 in the afternoon and, flying at an altitude of 5,000 feet (1,500 m) passed over East 23rd Street ten minutes later, traveling over 59th Street before turning around 11 minutes later, and landed at 2:44.
- Born: Constant Lambert, British composer, co-founder and music director of the Royal Ballet; in Fulham, London (d. 1951 from pneumonia and diabetes)

== August 24, 1905 (Thursday) ==
- Frederick D. White became the first Commissioner of the Northwest Territories in Canada, and would serve until his death in 1918.
- Born: Siaka Stevens, Prime Minister of Sierra Leone 1968–1971 and the African nation's first President (1971 to 1985); in Moyamba (d. 1985)

== August 25, 1905 (Friday) ==
- Theodore Roosevelt became the first U.S. President to travel underwater, after boarding the Navy submarine USS Plunger.
- A flash flood killed 18 people in the mining towns of Tabasco and Berwind, Colorado .
- Born: Saint Faustina Kowalska, Polish Roman Catholic nun, canonized in 2000; in Glogowiec (d. 1938)

== August 26, 1905 (Saturday) ==
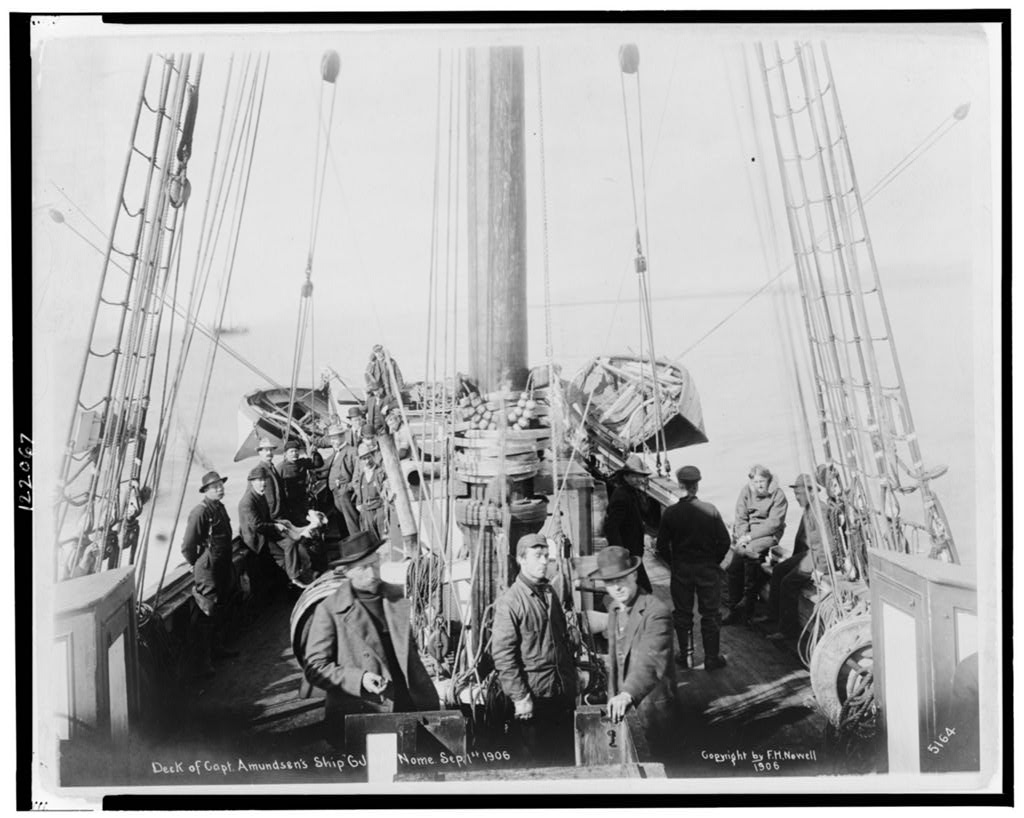
Amundsen with the crew of the Gjøa

- Near Point Barrow at the U.S. Territory of Alaska, the crew of the Norwegian ship Gjøa, led by Roald Amundsen, made the breakthrough of finding the long-sought "Northwest Passage" from the Atlantic Ocean to the Pacific Ocean. Amundsen would write later, "The North-West Passage had been accomplished-- my dream from childhood. This very moment it was fulfilled. I had a peculiar sensation in my throat; I was somewhat overworked and tired, and I suppose it was weakness on my part, but I could feel tears coming to my eyes."

== August 27, 1905 (Sunday) ==
- Influenced by educator Sergei Trubetskoy, Tsar Nicholas II issued a decree restoring autonomy to Russia's universities, restoring the autonomy that had been taken away from them in 1884. As part of the reform, students were allowed to hold meetings on university grounds for the first time in more than 20 years.
- Han Kyu-seol was appointed as the new Prime Minister of the Korean Empire, and the last before Korea would be turned into a protectorate of Japan. He would be fired on November 17, shortly after Korea and Japan signed the treaty of protection.

== August 28, 1905 (Monday) ==
- The sinking of the American steamship Peronic killed 28 of the crew off the coast of Florida.
- Born: Sam Levene, Russian-born American stage and film actor; as Scholem Lewin (d. 2000)

== August 29, 1905 (Tuesday) ==
- The largest steamship in the world was launched from the then-German port of Stettin (now Szeczin in Poland), with Kaiser Wilhelm II presiding.
- Born:
  - Dhyan Chand, Indian field hockey player who led the national team to three consecutive Olympic championships (1928, 1932 and 1936); in Allahabad, United Provinces of Agra and Oudh, British India (now Prayagraj, Uttar Pradesh, India)(d. 1979)
  - Al Taliaferro, American cartoonist who produced the Donald Duck newspaper comic strip; in Montrose, Colorado (d. 1969)

== August 30, 1905 (Wednesday) ==
- A solar eclipse took place, with greatest visibility in North Africa.
- Baseball star Ty Cobb made his major league debut at the age of 18, appearing for the Detroit Tigers after being called up from the Augusta (Georgia) Tourists in the South Atlantic League.

== August 31, 1905 (Thursday) ==
- The imperial government of China issued an order restoring commercial relations with the U.S. and prohibiting Chinese citizens from further participation in the boycott of American goods that had started on December 22, 1904.
- Born: Isadore "Dore" Schary, American playwright and screenwriter, later president of MGM Pictures; in Newark, New Jersey (d. 1980)
- Died: Francesco Tamagno, 54, Italian operatic tenor, died of a heart attack.
