= February 1905 =

Month of 1905

| << | February 1905 | | | | | >> |
| Su | Mo | Tu | We | Th | Fr | Sa |
| | | | 1 | 2 | 3 | 4 |
| 5 | 6 | 7 | 8 | 9 | 10 | 11 |
| 12 | 13 | 14 | 15 | 16 | 17 | 18 |
| 19 | 20 | 21 | 22 | 23 | 24 | 25 |
| 26 | 27 | 28 |

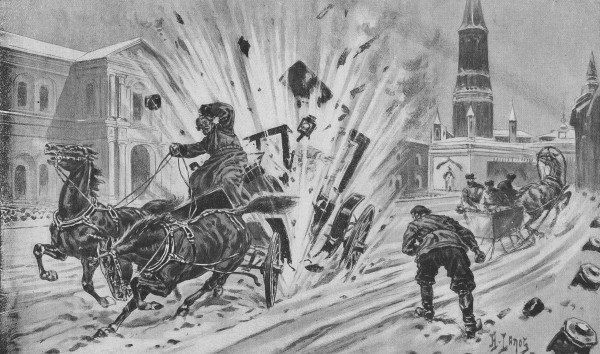
February 17, 1905: Grand Duke Sergius, Moscow's Governor-General, assassinated when a bomb is thrown into his horse-drawn carriage

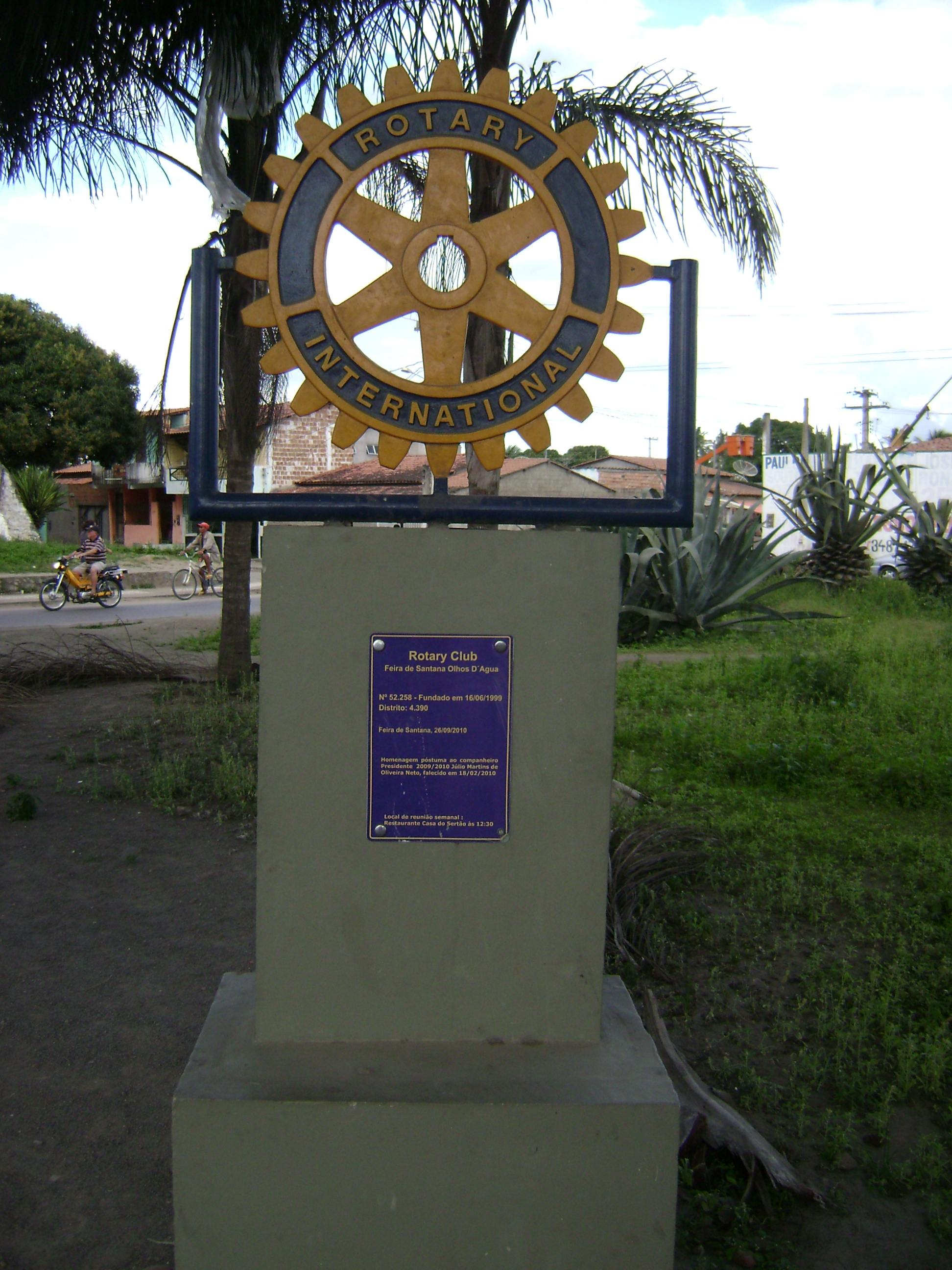
February 23, 1905: Rotary Club, now Rotary International, founded

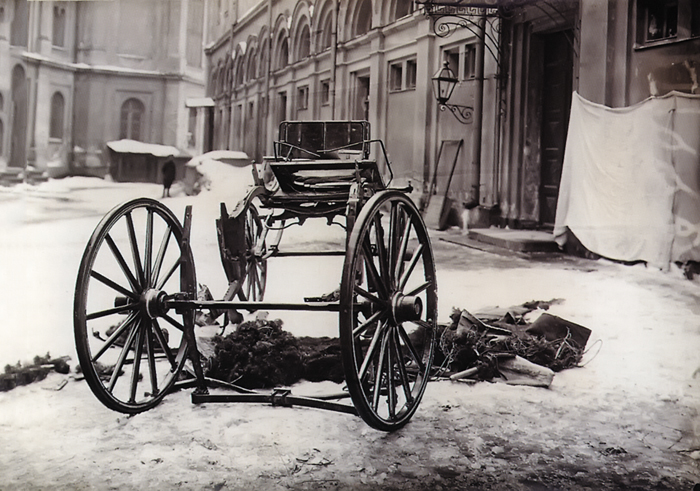
The remains of the Grand Duke's carriage

The following events occurred in February 1905:

== February 1, 1905 (Wednesday) ==
- U.S. Senator John H. Mitchell of Oregon was indicted by a federal grand jury on charges arising from a scandal involving land grants in the state and illegally using his influence for private clients. On July 3, he would be found guilty of receiving compensation illegally for representation against the federal government but would die before an appeal of his conviction could be decided.
- Pyotr Sviatopolk-Mirsky, referred to in the press as "Prince Mirsky", resigned as the Russian Interior Minister.
- Russia and Germany signed a treaty, with the Russians accepting the 1902 Brussels Sugar Convention and promising that no restrictions would be place on Jewish salesmen.
- Born: Emilio Segrè, Italian physicist, 1959 Nobel Prize in Physics laureate (with Owen Chamberlain) for his discovery of the subatomic antiproton, as well as the elements technetium and astatine; in Tivoli (d. 1989)

== February 2, 1905 (Thursday) ==
- Russia's cabinet of ministers recommended to Tsar Nicholas II that an elected legislature should be created to allow a public voice in the nation's government.

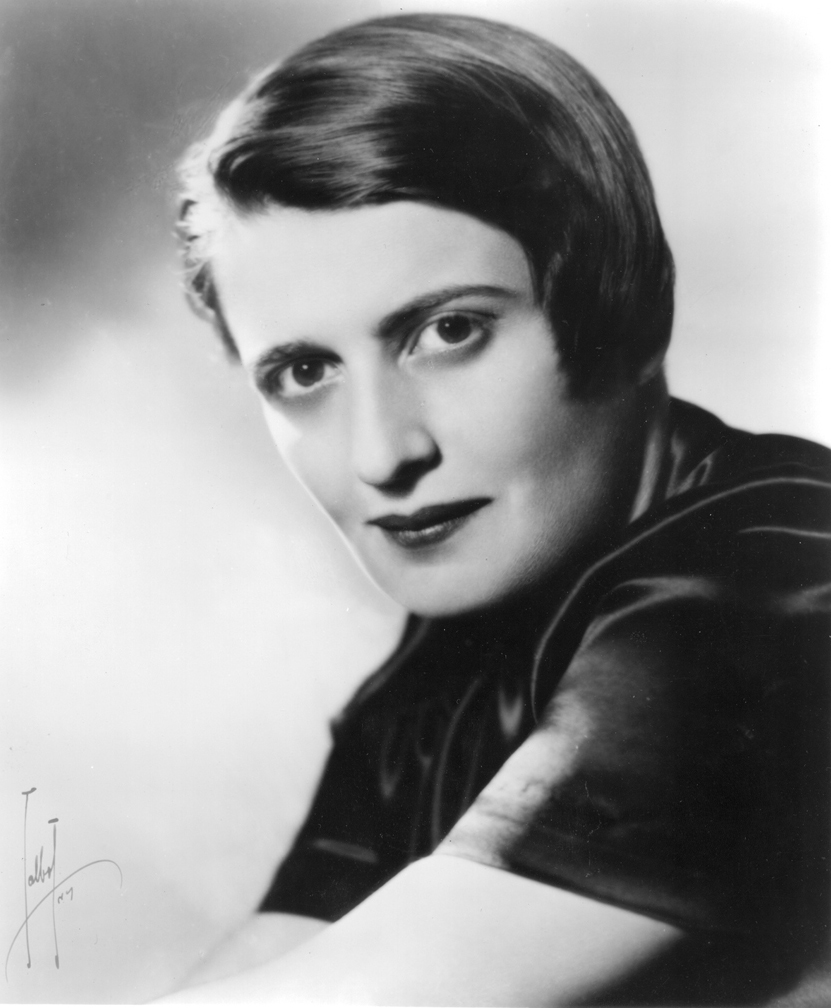
Rand

- Born: Ayn Rand (pen name for Alice O'Connor), Russian-born American novelist, playwright, and philosopher known for Atlas Shrugged and The Fountainhead; as Alisa Zinovyevna Rosenbaum in Saint Petersburg (d. 1982)

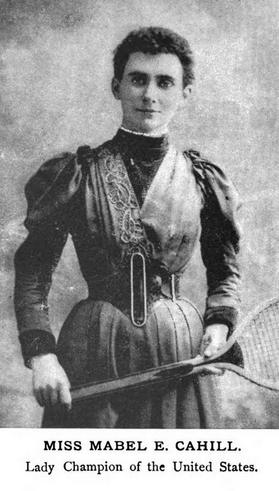
Cahill

- Died: Mabel Cahill, 41, Irish tennis champion and the first woman to win another nation's title in tennis, died of tuberculosis of the larynx. Starting with the 1891 U.S. national tennis championship for women, in singles and doubles and mixed doubles, she repeated the feat in 1892.

== February 3, 1905 (Friday) ==
- The first performance of A Shropshire Lad, the setting to music of the 1896 set of 63 poems of A. E. Housman by Arthur Somervell as a song-cycle, took place at Aeolian Hall in London.
- Died: Adolf Bastian, 78, German anthropologist known for his contributions to the development of anthropology as a discipline and of ethnography

== February 4, 1905 (Saturday) ==
- A simultaneous uprising began at six cities in Argentina against the government of President Manuel Quintana. Led by Hipólito Yrigoyen, the Unión Cívica Radical (UCR). Fighting broke out in Buenos Aires, Campo de Mayo, Bahía Blanca, Mendoza, Cordoba and Santa Fe, but the government had been alerted to Yrigoyen's plans and prepared a swift response that crushed the attempt within four days.
- Died: Louis-Ernest Barrias, 63, French sculptor

== February 5, 1905 (Sunday) ==
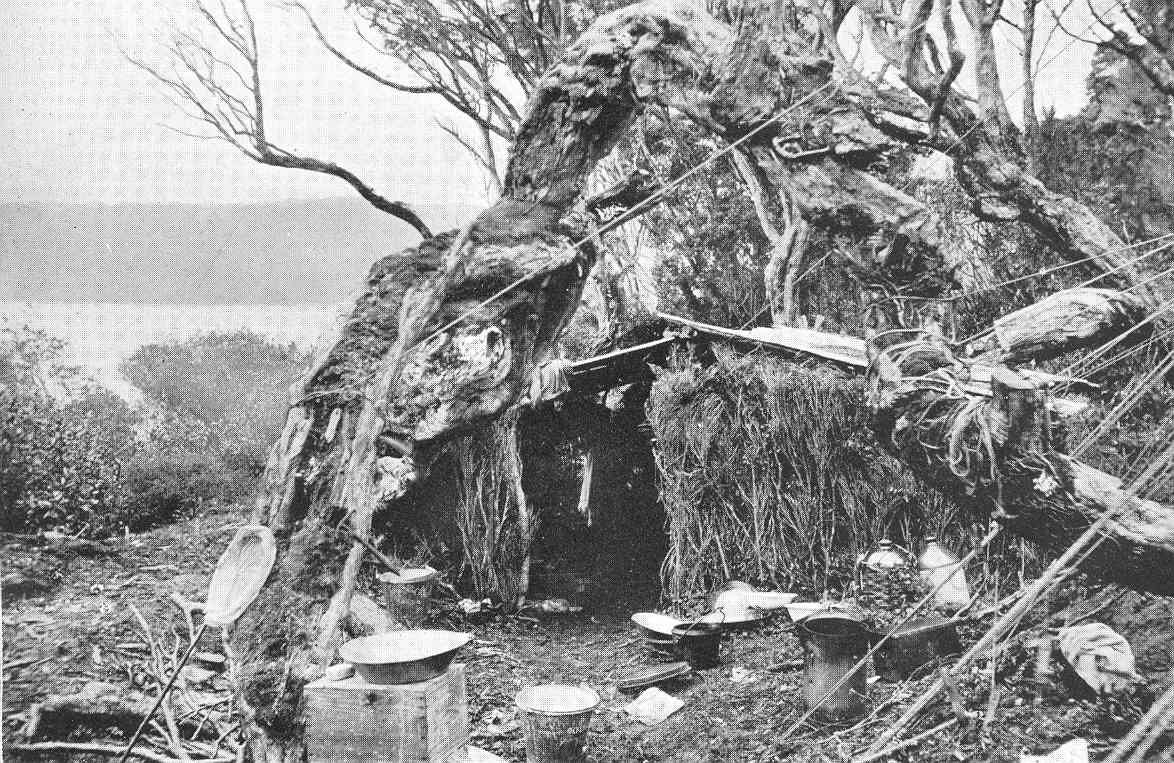
A hut built by one of the castaways from the Anjou

- The French ship Anjou was wrecked off of the coast of the uninhabited Auckland Island, located 290 miles (470 km) from the nearest inhabited land in New Zealand, the South Island. While Captain Raphaël Le Tallec and the crew of 22 men was able to reach shore, the castaways lived on the isle for more than three months until being rescued on May 7 by the government steamer NZGSS Hinemoa.

== February 6, 1905 (Monday) ==
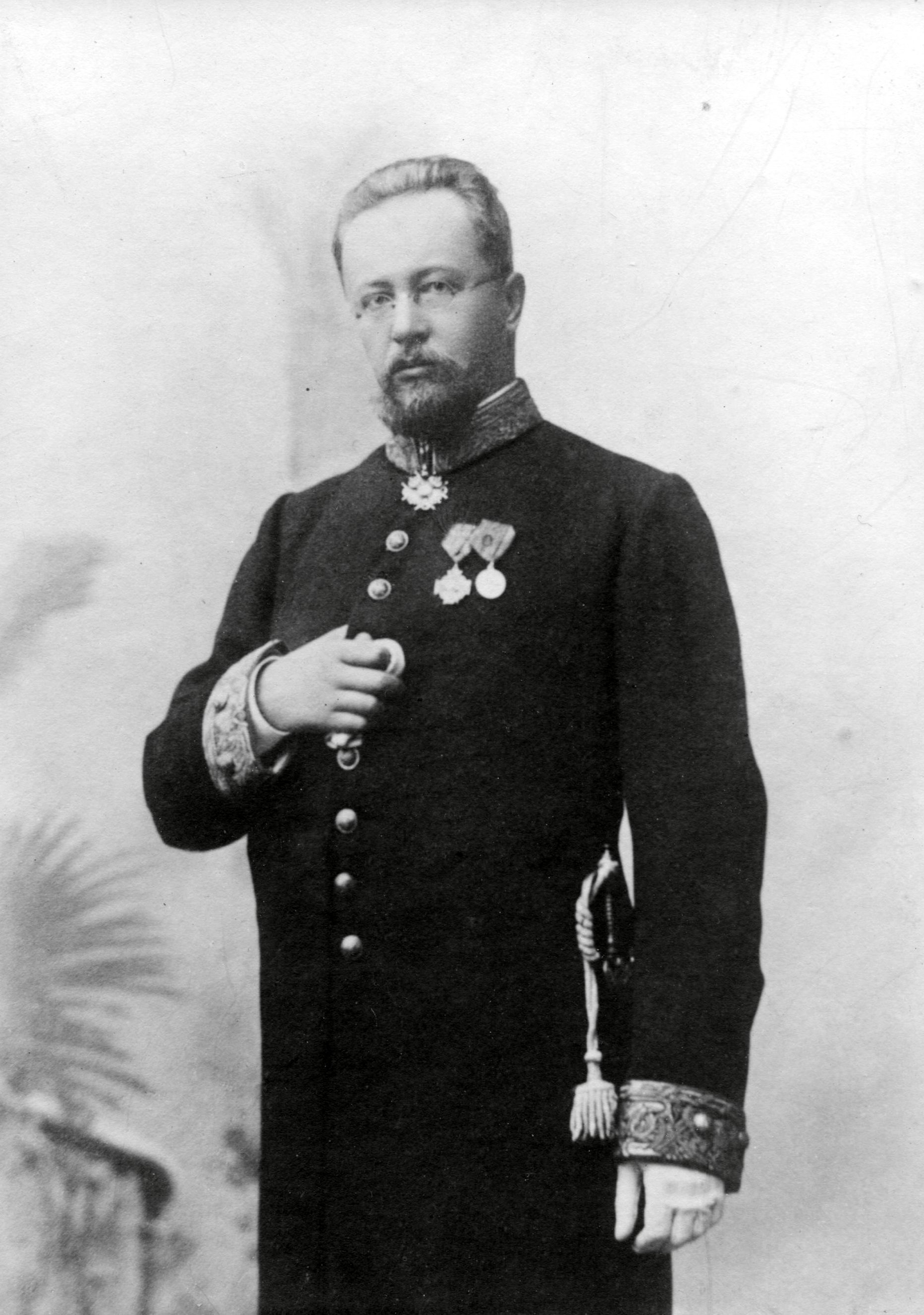
Chancellor Soisalon

- Eliel Soisalon-Soininen, the Chancellor of Justice of the Grand Duchy of Finland (at the time part of the Russian Empire) was assassinated at Helsingfors (Helsinki). Lennart Hohenthal, who had dressed as a Russian Army officer, walked past police and was guided by the Chancellor's bodyguard into the office. Hohenthal fired eight shots at Soisalon, two of which struck the Chancellor and killed him.
- U.S. President Theodore Roosevelt signed into law a measure providing for construction of railroads in the Philippines.
- Born: Irmgard Keun, German novelist, in Charlottenburg (d. 1982)

== February 7, 1905 (Tuesday) ==
- The U.S. Senate passed a bill providing for the admission for statehood of the Indian Territory (as Oklahoma) and for what are now New Mexico and Arizona as a single "State of New Mexico".
- Born:
  - Ulf von Euler, Swedish physiologist and pharmacologist, 1970 Nobel Prize laureate for his work on neurotransmitters; in Stockholm (d. 1983)
  - Paul Nizan, French author; in Tours, Indre-et-Loire département (killed in battle during World War II, 1940)

== February 8, 1905 (Wednesday) ==
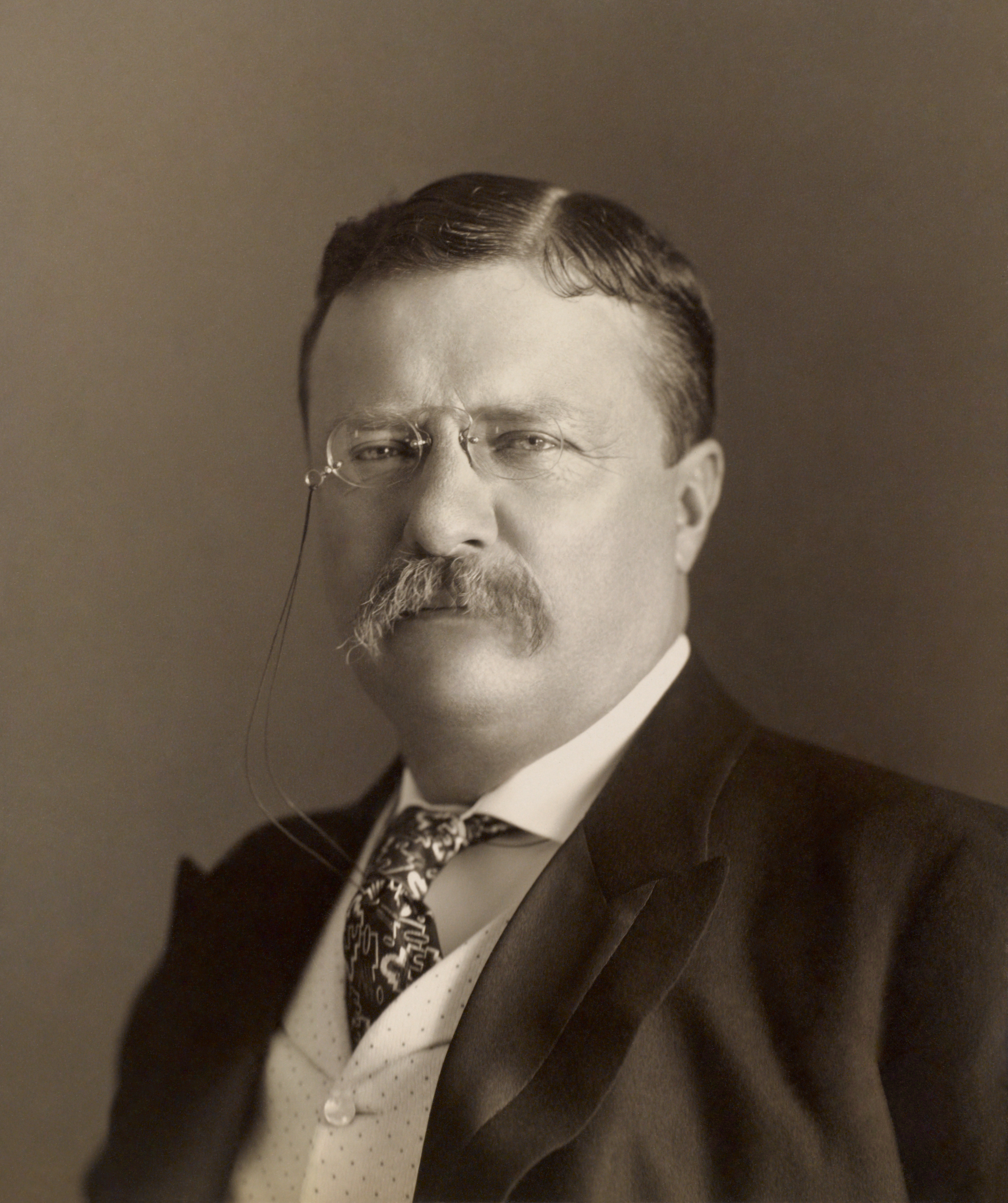
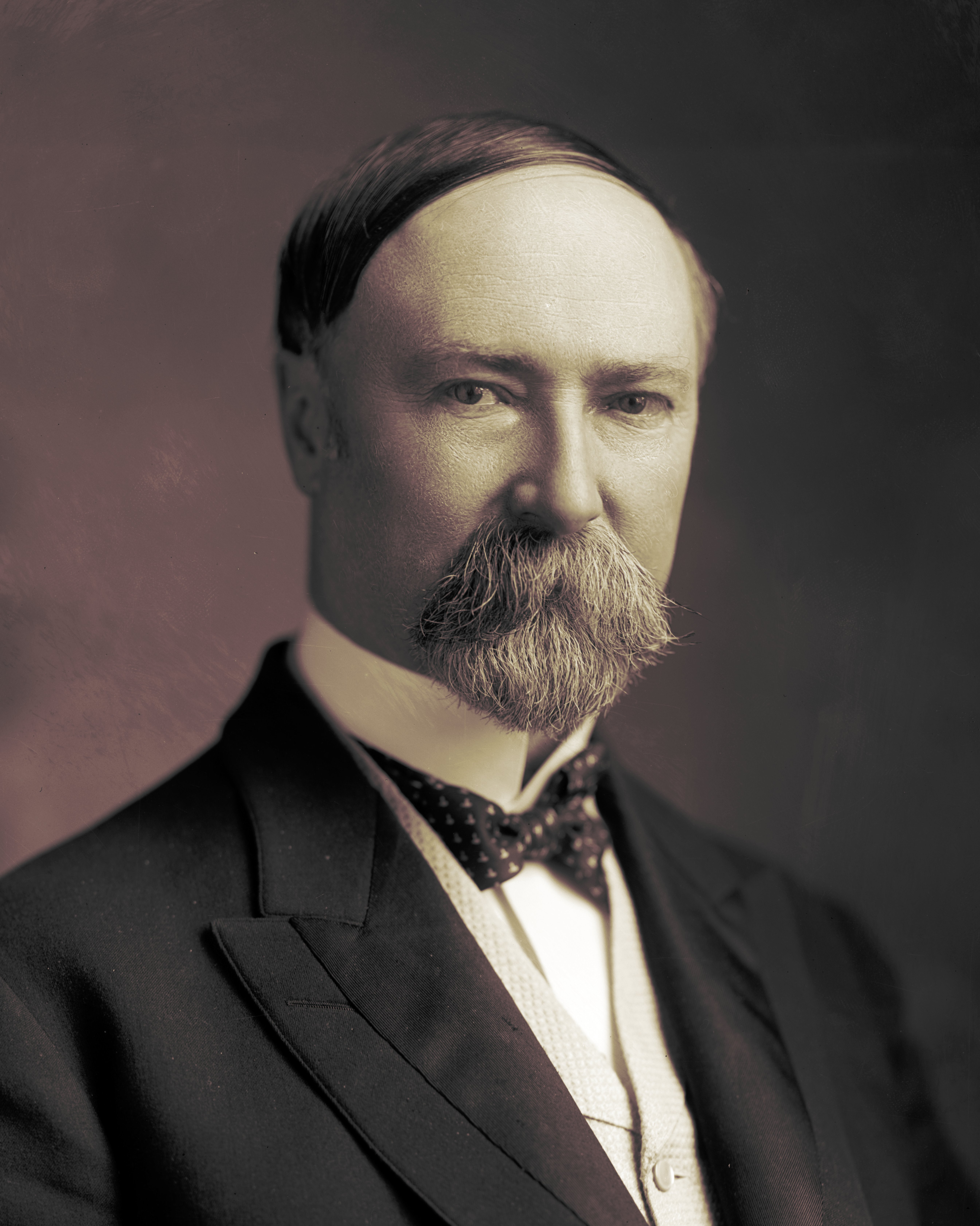
Roosevelt and Fairbanks
- The results of the electoral vote in the 1904 U.S. presidential election were certified, by U.S. Senator William P. Frye of Maine, in his capacity as president pro tempore of the Senate, in that the office of Vice President of the United States was vacant. Frye declared that 336 electoral votes had been cast for the Republican nominees, U.S. President Roosevelt and Charles W. Fairbanks for president and vice president, and 140 for Democratic nominees Alton Brooks Parker and Henry Gassaway Davis.
- France announced that it would provide no further loans to Turkey.

== February 9, 1905 (Thursday) ==
- In New York City, Dr. Prince A. Morrow, a dermatologist and hygienist, began the movement in the U.S. for sex education, with the founding of the first "social hygiene" organization, the Society of Sanitary and Moral Prophylaxis. The Society would merge with other organizations in 1910 to become the American Federation for Sex Hygiene, with Morrow as president.
- In Persia, the Ayatollah Mirza Sayyed Mohammad Tabatabai and Nazim al-Islam Kirmani organized the Anjuman-i-Makhfi ("Secret Society") to plan what would become the Iranian Constitutional Revolution that would force the ouster of the totalitarian regime of the Shah, Mozaffar ad-Din Shah Qajar.
- Died: Adolph von Menzel, 89, German painter and Realist

== February 10, 1905 (Friday) ==
- The impeachment trial of U.S. District Judge Charles Swayne of Florida opened in the U.S. Senate.
- Born: Walter A. Brown, American sports executive; in Hopkinton, Massachusetts. Brown is the only person inducted into both the Hockey Hall of Fame (in 1962) and the Basketball Hall of Fame (in 1965), having founded basketball's Boston Celtics, owning ice hockey's Boston Bruins, and coaching the U.S. ice hockey team and serving as president of the International Ice Hockey Federation (d. 1964)
- Died: James S. McCue, 44, former mayor of Charlottesville, Virginia, was executed by hanging for the September 1904 murder of his wife, Fannie Crawford McCue.

== February 11, 1905 (Saturday) ==
- J. N. Williamson, one of the two U.S. representatives for Oregon, was indicted on charges arising from the Oregon land fraud scandal. He would be convicted of political corruption and the illegal acquisition of public lands, but the conviction would be overturned in 1908 by the United States Supreme Court in Williamson v. United States.

== February 12, 1905 (Sunday) ==
- Switzerland's national soccer football team played its first international game, traveling to Paris to play the France national football team at the Parc des Princes. France won the match, 1 to 0.
- Greek guerrillas attacked the Albanian village of Negovani in the Ottoman Empire, and killed Father Kristo, his brother and three other people, triggering a response by Albanian guerrilla leader Bajo Topulli to organize the Secret Committee for the Liberation of Albania.
- Died: Marcel Schwob, 37, influential French symbolist short-story writer, died of pneumonia.

== February 13, 1905 (Monday) ==
- Oregon's other U.S. Representative, Binger Hermann, was indicted for collusion of a land deal in the Blue Mountain Forest Reserve and for destroying public documents. He would not be convicted of either charge.
- Born: Ra'ana Liaquat Ali Khan, Pakistani stateswoman known as "The Mother of Pakistan" ("Māder-e-Pakistan"); in Almora, United Provinces of Agra and Oudh, British India. In addition to being the wife of Pakistan's first Prime Minister, Liaquat Ali Khan, she served as Governor of the Pakistani province of Sindh (1973-1976), the first Chancellor of the University of Karachi, and Pakistan's ambassador at different times to the Netherlands, Italy and Tunisia. (d. 1990)

== February 14, 1905 (Tuesday) ==
- King Edward VII opened Parliament in the United Kingdom.

== February 15, 1905 (Wednesday) ==
- Alexander Glazunov's Violin Concerto in A minor was given its first performance, as the Russian Musical Society held a concert at Saint Petersburg.
- Terrorists of Russia's Combat Organization called off a planned assassination of Moscow's Governor General, Grand Duke Sergei, who was taking his family to a concert at the Bolshoi Theatre, after seeing that Sergei and his wife were accompanied by two children.
- The Ohio Department of Transportation was founded.
- Born: Harold Arlen (pen name for Hyman Arluck), American popular music composer of the melodies of over 500 songs, including "Over the Rainbow" for 1939's The Wizard of Oz (d. 1986)

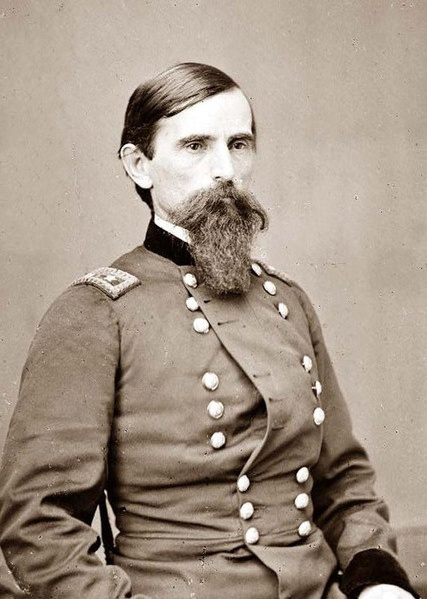
General Wallace

- Died: U.S. Army General Lew Wallace, 77, American officer, civil servant, diplomat and writer known for the bestselling novel Ben-Hur: A Tale of the Christ (b. 1827). He also served as Governor of the New Mexico Territory (1878-1881) and the U.S. Minister to the Ottoman Empire (1881-1885), and is the only novelist whose statue is displayed in the U.S. Capitol.

== February 16, 1905 (Thursday) ==
- Six of the 11 crew of the Royal Navy submarine HMS A5 were killed by a pair of explosions caused by gasoline fumes, after the sub stopped at the Haulbowline Base in Ireland.
- Died: Jay Cooke, 83, American financier whose Jay Cooke & Company helped finance the Union war effort during the American Civil War and the postwar development of the Northern Pacific Railway in the northwestern United States

== February 17, 1905 (Friday) ==
- Grand Duke Sergei Alexandrovich of Russia, the Governor-General of Moscow and uncle of Tsar Nicholas II, was assassinated when a nitroglycerin bomb was thrown into the carriage in which he was riding. As the carriage was being driven by Andrei Rudinkin through the gate of Nikolskaya Tower of the Kremlin, anarchist Ivan Kalyayev stepped forward and threw the bomb directly into Sergei's lap. The explosion blast disintegrated the carriage and the Grand Duke. Driver Rudinkin and assassin Kalyayev were both injured, with Rudinkin dying three days later.
- The first public demonstration of judo in the United States was given at Princeton University as Japanese judokas Tsunejiro Tomita and Mitsuyo Maeda threw two challengers, Princeton Tigers football player N. B. Tooker, and Princeton instructor Samuel Feagles. Baltimore Sun, February 18, 1905. A second demonstration took place four days later at the U.S. Military Academy at West Point.
- At Fremantle, Australia, the RMS Orizaba was wrecked, but all 160 passengers and the mail were saved.
- Born: Frans Piët, Dutch comic strip artist known for Sjors en Sjimmie; in Haarlem (d. 1997)

== February 18, 1905 (Saturday) ==
- The UK, France, Italy and Russia all declined to support a proposal by Prince George of Greece to allow for the annexation of Crete.

== February 19, 1905 (Sunday) ==
- Peru lodged a protest against the treaty between Chile and Bolivia.

== February 20, 1905 (Monday) ==
- In the Russo-Japanese War, the Battle of Mukden began in Manchuria.
- The Saint Petersburg Imperial University closed early by vote of the students, professors and directors, due to the unrest within the Russian capital. The closure resolution included a demand for a constituent assembly.

== February 21, 1905 (Tuesday) ==
- Sir Wilfrid Laurier introduced a resolution in the Canadian parliament proposing that two new provinces, Alberta and Saskatchewan, be created out of the Northwest Territories.
- The United Kingdom House of Commons voted against passing the proposed resolution by MP John Redmond of Ireland to declare that he British government was opposed to the will of the Irish people. The with the amendment failing, 236 to 286.

== February 22, 1905 (Wednesday) ==
- In the Russian-ruled Viceroyalty of the Caucasus, a provisional government was reported established by Georgian secessionists in the Kutaisi Governorate and the Batum Oblast.

== February 23, 1905 (Thursday) ==
- The Rotary International service club was founded in the U.S. by Chicago attorney Paul P. Harris, who brought three other businessmen (mining engineer Gustave Loehr coal merchant Silvester Schiele, and tailor Hiram E. Shorey) to a meeting at Loehr's office in the Unity Building at 127 North Dearborn Street, with the original idea that " professionals with diverse backgrounds could exchange ideas."
- Born: D. H. Lehmer, American mathematician known for the Lucas–Lehmer primality test for Mersenne prime numbers; in Berkeley, California (d. 1991)

== February 24, 1905 (Friday) ==
- An assassin attempted to kill the President of the Dominican Republic, Carlos Morales.

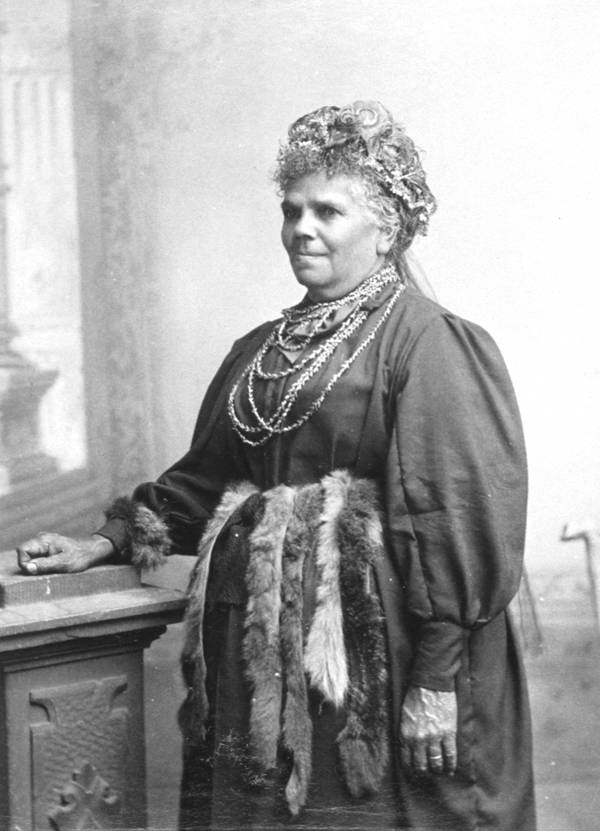
Mrs. Smith of the Palawas

- Died: Fanny Cochrane Smith, 70, Aboriginal Tasmanian (or Palawa) who was the last fluent speaker of Palawan language used by the natives of Flinders Island, located off the coast of the Australian state of Tasmania

== February 25, 1905 (Saturday) ==
- Alcide Laurin became the first known ice hockey player to be killed during a game. Laurine, a 24-year-old player playing for the Alexandria Crescents was beaten to death with a hockey stick during a game at Maxville, Ontario by Maxville's Allan Loney. Loney became the first ice hockey player to be charged with murdering another player during a game, but was tried for manslaughter and was acquitted.

== February 26, 1905 (Sunday) ==
- The Panama Canal Commission of the U.S. unanimously recommended construction of a sea-level canal across the Isthmus of Panama, and estimated that it could be completed within 12 years at a cost of $230,500,000.
- In the Russo-Japanese War, the Russians sustained a severe defeat in Manchuria at Tsen-ho-Cheng.
- More than 20 miners were killed in a coal mine explosion at Wilcoe, West Virginia.

== February 27, 1905 (Monday) ==
- Judge Swayne was acquitted of all charges in his impeachment trial.
- The Senate of the U.S. state of California voted to expel four state Senators who had been charged with accepting bribes.
- Born: Franchot Tone, American stage, film and television actor known for the 1935 film Mutiny on the Bounty and the 1930 play Green Grow the Lilacs; in Niagara Falls, New York (d. 1968)

== February 28, 1905 (Tuesday) ==
- Jane Stanford, the co-founder with her husband Leland of Stanford University, was fatally poisoned while visiting the Moana Hotel in Hawaii. Although a coroner's jury determined that she had been murdered after having strychnine introduced to her in a bicarbonate of soda, but no charges were brought. A historian would conclude later that Mrs. Stanford had been poisoned by her personal secretary, Bertha Berner, who had been present at an earlier incident of poisoning on January 14.
