= Violence in ice hockey =

Illegal actions in ice hockey

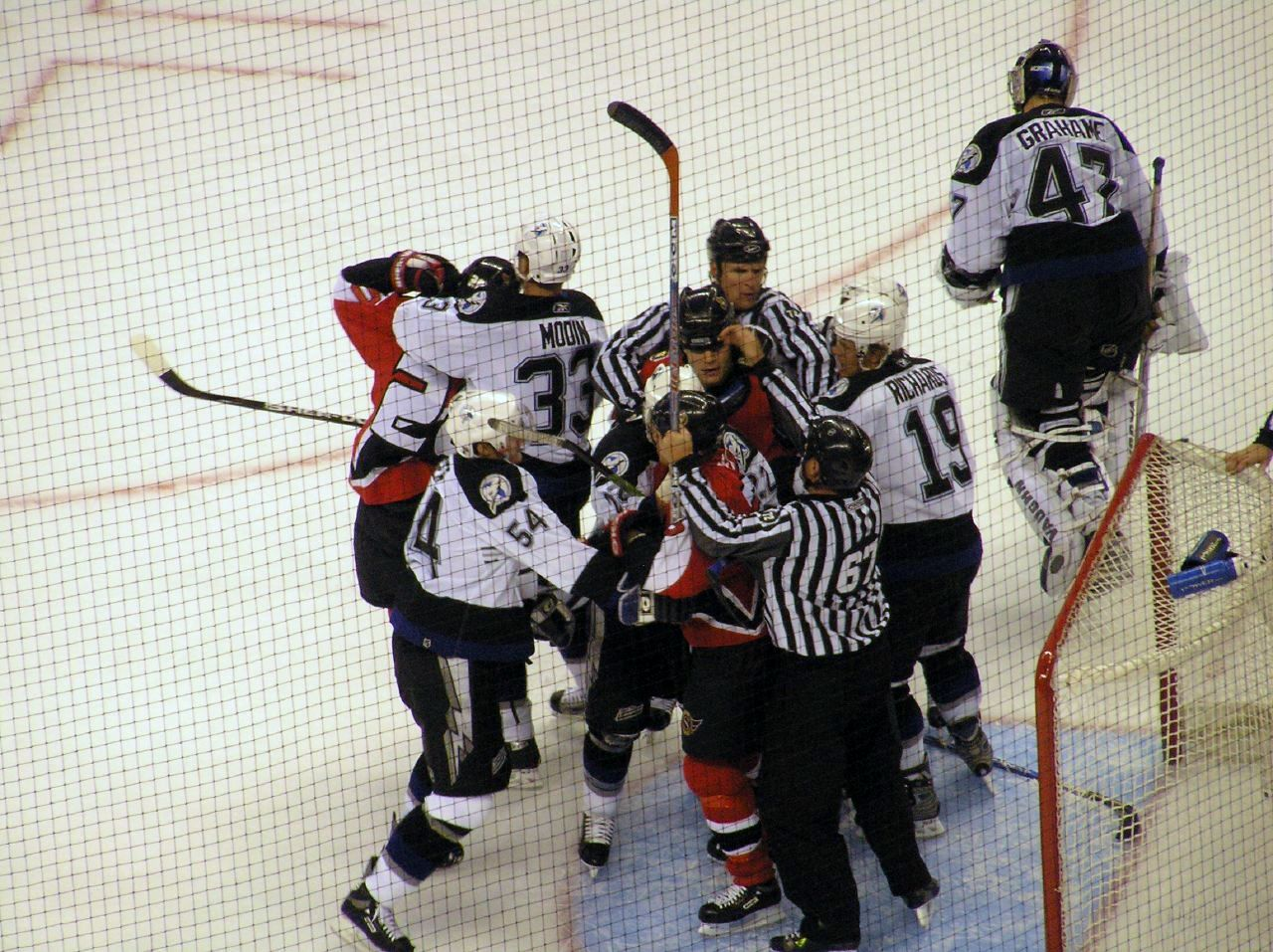
Linesmen attempt to break up a fight around the Tampa Bay goal during the first ice hockey playoff game between the Ottawa Senators and the Tampa Bay Lightning.

Violence has been a part of ice hockey since at least the early 1900s. According to the book Hockey: A People's History, in 1904 alone, four players were killed during hockey games from the frequent brawls and violent stickwork.

More modern examples of violence include brawls, bench-clearing brawls, fighting, fan involvement, physical abuse of officials and deliberately injuring opponents. Violent actions such as kicking, hitting from behind and prohibited stickwork, are penalized with suspensions or fines. Fighting, or fisticuffs, is also penalized but is considered by many hockey enthusiasts, particularly in North America, to be quite distinct from stick-swinging or other violent acts. They regard fighting as an entrenched, acceptable and integral part of the game.

On the ice, referees may impose penalties for prohibited activities. Off the ice, the National Hockey League (NHL) sometimes fines, suspends or expels players. The criminal justice system has also occasionally charged and convicted players. As a result, hockey has become much more regulated and the violent element much more controlled. This has been aided, in no small part, by dramatic increases in disciplinary processes and technology allowing for a high level of scrutiny of any event which occurs.

== History ==
Early hockey in particular was noted for its extreme violence, to the point where two players were killed in three years during brawls. In both cases, the accused assailants were acquitted, but these and other bloody incidents led to calls for the sport to clean up its act or be banned along with the likes of cockfighting. The worst of the violence waned, particularly with the advent of regulations for quasi-legal fisticuffs, though incidents continue to occur from time to time.

Cully Wilson, right winger with the Seattle Metropolitans, slashed Vancouver Millionaires center Mickey MacKay over the mouth during the 1919 PCHA season. MacKay suffered a fractured jaw and missed the rest of the season. When the season was over PCHA chief disciplinarian Frank Patrick banned Wilson from the league, and Wilson never played in the PCHA again.

Billy Coutu was the first, and to date only, player banned from the NHL for life for violence in 1927; he assaulted referee Jerry Laflamme and tackled referee Billy Bell before starting a bench-clearing brawl during a Stanley Cup game between the Boston Bruins and Ottawa Senators, apparently on the orders of Bruins Head Coach Art Ross. The NHL's first president, Frank Calder, expelled Coutu from the NHL for life; the ban was lifted after two-and-a-half years, but Coutu never played in the NHL again.

Other incidents include the December 12, 1933, event when Eddie Shore rammed Toronto Maple Leafs star Ace Bailey from behind, causing Bailey to strike his head on the ice; Bailey never played hockey again. More recently, controversy and criminal charges have resulted from violent attacks by Marty McSorley, Todd Bertuzzi and Chris Simon.

Players who are banned in the American Hockey League (AHL) for violence are not permitted in the ECHL, and vice versa, because of their agreements with the Professional Hockey Players' Association.

In January 2012, David Johnston, the Governor General of Canada, said that violence such as headshots, high-sticking and fighting should not be part of the sport.

== Reports investigating violence ==
There have been two major Canadian reports on violence in hockey. In 1974, William McMurtry provided a report for the Government of Ontario entitled Investigation and Inquiry into Violence in Amateur Hockey. In 2000, Bernie Pascall prepared a report for the Government of British Columbia entitled Eliminating Violence in Hockey.

== On-ice incidents resulting in charges ==
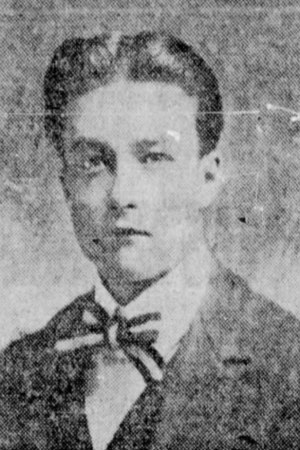
Alcide Laurin.

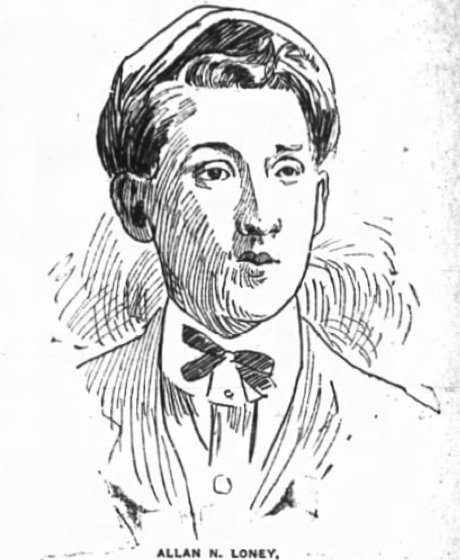
Allan Loney.

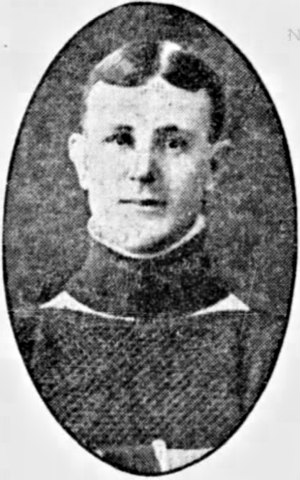
Owen "Bud" McCourt.

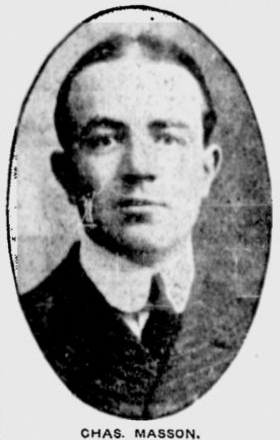
Charles Masson.

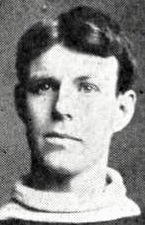
Edgar Dey.

- 1905 – Allan Loney was charged with manslaughter in the on-ice clubbing death of Alcide Laurin. Loney claimed self-defence, and was found not guilty.
- 1907 – Ottawa Hockey Club players Harry Smith, Alf Smith and Charles Spittal were charged with assault after beating Montreal Wanderers players Hod Stuart, Ernie "Moose" Johnson and Cecil Blachford with their sticks. Harry Smith was acquitted while Spittal and Alf Smith were each fined $20.
- 1907 – Ottawa Victorias player Charles Masson was charged with manslaughter after Cornwall player Owen McCourt died of a head wound sustained in a brawl. Masson was found not guilty on the grounds that there was no way to know which blow had killed McCourt.
- 1908 – Charles Spittal (of Renfrew Riversides) arrested for knocking out Oren Frood of Pembroke (UOVHL) on January 17, 1908. Charge was withdrawn on January 20, 1908.
- 1910 – Rusty Crawford, while a member of the Prince Albert Mintos, assaulted Reginald Brehaut of the Saskatoon Strathconas in a game in Saskatoon on January 11, 1910. Crawford was later found guilty of assault on January 19 in a Saskatoon city police court and fined $5 and costs.
- 1912 – Edgar Dey was fined $50 by Halifax magistrate's court in Nova Scotia for assaulting Patsy Séguin in a January 5 MPHL game between the Halifax Socials and Halifax Crescents. Dey himself died the following month on February 13 from chest injuries thought to stem partly from his tussle with Séguin.
- 1912 – Sprague Cleghorn of the Montreal Wanderers pleaded guilty in a Toronto court of assaulting Newsy Lalonde of the Montreal Canadiens with his stick in a pre-season exhibition game at the Arena Gardens in Toronto on December 21, 1912. Cleghorn was fined $50 by Judge Morgan on December 28.
- 1915 – A riot broke out at the end of a game on January 2, 1915 between Ottawa College and the Cleveland Athletic Club at the Elysium Arena in Cleveland, and Ottawa College goaltender Vincent Doran was arrested on a charge for assaulting Cleveland player Elmer Irving. Irving refused to prosecute and the case was dropped in a Cleveland police court on January 4.
- 1915 – Roy McGiffin of the Toronto Blueshirts and Art Ross of the Ottawa Senators were involved in a fist fight with each other in a NHA game between the two clubs on February 17, 1915 which had both players arrested. They were released on $100 bail each, and later appeared in court where they were fined $1 and costs. McGiffin and Ross tossed a coin to determine who would pay the $8 bill, with McGiffin ending up paying for both.
- 1916 – Skene Ronan of the Montreal Canadiens assaulted Alf Skinner of the Toronto Blueshirts in a NHA game between the two clubs on January 22, 1916 which had him arrested by police and taken to the Agnes Street station in Toronto, although he was later released on $200 bail. The incident went to trial and Ronan was acquitted of the charge on January 31 before Judge Winchester in Toronto, with Canadiens manager George Kennedy acting as a witness for the defense.
- 1918 – Joe Hall of the Montreal Canadiens and Alf Skinner of the Toronto Arenas were both arrested after an NHL game on January 28, 1918 after they had hit each other violently with their sticks. Hall and Skinner appeared in a Toronto court together on January 29 and both were released after being handed a suspended sentence.
- 1922 – Sprague Cleghorn of the Montreal Canadiens injured three Ottawa Senators players (Frank Nighbor, Eddie Gerard and Cy Denneny) in a game on February 1, leading Ottawa police to offer to arrest him.
- 1969 – In a pre-season game held in Ottawa, Ted Green of the Boston Bruins and Wayne Maki of the St. Louis Blues engaged in a violent, stick-swinging brawl. A fractured skull and brain damage caused Green to miss the entire 1969–70 season. The NHL suspended Maki for 30 days and Green for 13 games. Both men were acquitted in court.
- 1972 – St. Louis Blues head coach Al Arbour and players John Arbour, Phil Roberto, and Floyd Thomson were charged with disorderly conduct and assault and battery on police officers following a brawl with fans and the police during a game against the Philadelphia Flyers. All charges were later dropped.
- 1975 – Dan Maloney of the Detroit Red Wings was charged with assault causing bodily harm after he attacked Brian Glennie of the Toronto Maple Leafs from behind. In exchange for a no-contest plea, Maloney did community service work and was banned from playing in Toronto for two seasons. Ironically, after he served his ban, he joined the Maple Leafs as a player and coached for them after his playing career was over.
- 1975 – Police charged Boston Bruins player Dave Forbes with aggravated assault after a fight with Henry Boucha of the Minnesota North Stars. After a nine-day trial ended with a hung jury, charges against Forbes were dropped. Boucha suffered blurred vision from the incident and never fully recovered.
- 1976 – Philadelphia Flyers players Joe Watson, Mel Bridgman, Don Saleski and Bob "Hound" Kelly were charged with assault after using their hockey sticks as weapons in a violent playoff game between the Flyers and the Toronto Maple Leafs in which fans had been taunting the Flyers players and spitting at them. Bridgman was acquitted, but the other three Flyers were found guilty of simple assault.
- 1976 – Calgary Cowboys forward Rick Jodzio plead guilty to a charge of assault following a cross-check to the head of Quebec Nordiques player Marc Tardif during the World Hockey Association (WHA) playoffs. The hit led to a 20-minute bench-clearing brawl.
- 1977 – Dave "Tiger" Williams of the Toronto Maple Leafs hit the Pittsburgh Penguins' Dennis Owchar with his stick. He was charged with assault, but acquitted.
- 1980 – Jimmy Mann of the Winnipeg Jets left the bench and sucker-punched Pittsburgh Penguin Paul Gardner, breaking Gardner's jaw in two places. Mann was fined $500 and given a suspended sentence in Winnipeg.
- 1988 – Dino Ciccarelli hit Maple Leafs defenceman Luke Richardson with his stick. Charged and convicted of assault, he was sentenced to one day in jail and fined $1,000.
- 1992 – Enrico Ciccone of the IHL's Kalamazoo Wings was arrested on a battery charge after San Diego Gulls photographer Essy Ghavameddini was cut and received a deep bruise below his left eye that required stitches. Ciccone assaulted him after entering the penalty box from where Ghavameddini was photographing the game.
- 1998 – Jesse Boulerice of the Plymouth Whalers was suspended for the rest of the playoffs after violently swinging his stick at Guelph Storm forward Andrew Long. Boulerice was charged with assault as a result of the incident.
- 1999 – Dean Trboyevich of the Anchorage Aces (West Coast Hockey League) cross-checked Jacques Mailhot of the Fresno Falcons in the face and was arrested at his hotel after the game, and was later released on a $20,000 bail.
- 2000 – Marty McSorley of the Boston Bruins hit Vancouver Canucks player Donald Brashear in the head with his stick in the waning moments of the game, after losing a fight to Brashear earlier in the game. McSorley was convicted of assault with a weapon and given an 18-month conditional discharge.
- 2004 – In the Todd Bertuzzi–Steve Moore incident, Bertuzzi of the Vancouver Canucks sucker-punched Moore of the Colorado Avalanche in the back of the head, knocking him unconscious. The pair then fell to the ice with Bertuzzi's weight crushing Moore face-first into the ice, followed by several players from both teams further piling onto the mêlée. Moore sustained three fractured vertebrae, a grade three concussion, vertebral ligament damage, stretching of the brachial plexus nerves and facial lacerations. Bertuzzi was charged by police and given a conditional discharge after pleading guilty to assault causing bodily harm. His suspension resulted in a loss of $500,000 in pay and the Canucks were fined $250,000. Bertuzzi was re-instated in 2005, after a 20 game suspension and an international ban during the 2004-05 lockout season. A civil suit filed by Moore, seeking CAD$68 million in damages and loss of income, was settled on August 19, 2014. The terms of this settlement are confidential.
- 2015 – During the warm up before a qualifier to the SHL, André Deveaux from Rögle BK assaulted Västerås IK's unsuspecting Per Helmersson. Deveaux swung his stick and slashed Helmersson twice. The attack was retaliation for a hit from behind by Helmersson in the game before, which Deveaux claimed caused him a minor concussion. Both players could complete both games, and Deveaux was only disciplined after the game. Deveaux was charged for the attack, but the charges were later dropped.
- 2015 – During an Allsvenskan (Sweden's second tier league) game on March 5, 2015 Rögle BK forward Jakob Lilja cross-checked Malmö Redhawks defenceman Jens Olsson from behind in the neck area. Lilja received a 10-game suspension, with four of the games converted into a monetary fine as per custom. Over three years later, on July 10, 2018 the Supreme Court of Sweden, after the case had first gone through the lower District Court of Malmö, handed Lilja a one-month probation sentence while removing the earlier imposed monetary fine because Lilja had already been imposed a fine by the ice hockey Disciplinary Committee.
- 2023 - Adam Johnson of the Nottingham Panthers in the Elite Ice Hockey League died on October 28 as a result of skate slash to his neck by Matt Petgrave during a game. Petgrave was later arrested on suspicion of manslaughter on November 14, and released on bail. The incident renewed a debate about the safety of the sport and the International Ice Hockey Federation and multiple national associations made neck guards mandatory to be worn at all levels.

== Longest suspensions ==
All of these incidents are in the NHL of the United States and Canada, unless noted otherwise.

Name	Team	Length	Date	Offense
Slava Voynov	Los Angeles Kings	1 1/2 years	April 2019	Unacceptable off ice conduct (Voynov was arrested for misdemeanor domestic violence in October 2014 and was originally banned indefinitely following his arrest; he was suspended for the entire 2019–20 NHL season. The neutral arbitrator upheld his suspension, but he was credited for serving 41 games. Therefore, he became eligible for reinstatement in January 2020.)
Billy Coutu	Boston Bruins	Permanent (commuted)	April 1927	Assaulted referee Jerry Laflamme, tackled referee Billy Bell and started a Stanley Cup bench-clearing brawl, apparently on the orders of coach Art Ross (Originally banned for life, but penalty was commuted after two-and-a-half years, but Coutu never played in the NHL again.)
Dan Maloney	Detroit Red Wings	2 years	November 1975	Mentioned above (Banned from playing in Toronto only)
Damir Ryspayev	Barys Astana (KHL)	1 1/2 years	August 2016	Initiated a violent bench-clearing brawl against Tomáš Marcinko and other players from Red Star Kunlun during a preseason game (Originally banned for life; penalty was commuted after 1 year and 5 months.)
Alexander Perezhogin	Hamilton Bulldogs (AHL)	89 games	April 2004	Slashed Garrett Stafford in the head (Perezhogin was suspended for five 2004 playoff games plus all 80 regular season games and four playoff games of the 2004–05 season, but the Russian Superleague did not honor his suspension unlike Todd Bertuzzi's suspension, so he was able to play in that league's 2004-05 season.)
Todd Bertuzzi	Vancouver Canucks	17 months (20 games—13 regular season games plus seven playoff games)	March 2004	Mentioned above (Since there was a labour dispute in the NHL the ensuing year, and the NHL is an IIHF member, the suspension was good for all IIHF member leagues in the ensuing season. Reinstated by the NHL Commissioner on August 8, 2005.)
André Deveaux	Rögle BK (SHL Qualifier)	10 1/2 months	March 2015	Assaulted unsuspecting Per Helmersson during a warmup (Deveaux subsequently agreed to terminate his contract.)
Michael Liambas	Erie Otters (OHL)	68 games (64 regular season, 4 playoffs)	October 2009	Check to the head of the Kitchener Rangers' Ben Fanelli, giving him a fractured skull. Suspension ended Liambas' OHL career. Fanelli eventually recovered.
Dragusica Luke	Brampton Steelheads (OHL)	49 games	November 2025	Slashed the head of Oshawa Generals defenceman Brady Blaseg, followed by cross checking him whilst down on the ice, resulting in injury. Dragusica was subsequently suspended for the remainder of the season.
Raffi Torres	San Jose Sharks	41 games	October 2015	Illegal check to the head on Jakob Silfverberg and interference (longest non-lifetime suspension in NHL history; suspension length was issued because Torres had nine previous instances of NHL rule violations which required supplemental discipline rather than the check itself)
Shane Pinto	Ottawa Senators	41 games	October 2023	Violated NHL's gambling rules
Chris Simon	New York Islanders	30 games	December 2007	Stomped on Jarkko Ruutu's ankle during a timeout
Ari Lähteenmäki	HIFK (SM-liiga)	27 games	November 1986	Cross-checked Petri Lampinen in the face (with enough force to break the stick), and struck his head into the ice repeatedly. Longest suspension in SM-liiga's history.
Austin Watson	Nashville Predators	27 games	September 2018	Unacceptable off-ice conduct (Watson was arrested for domestic assault in June 2018; suspension was reduced to 18 games upon appeal)
Chris Simon	New York Islanders	25 games	March 2007	Slashed Ryan Hollweg in the head
Jesse Boulerice	Philadelphia Flyers	25 games	October 2007	Cross-checked Ryan Kesler in the face
Marty McSorley	Boston Bruins	23 games	February 2000	Mentioned above (After his assault conviction, his NHL suspension was extended to one full year from the time of the incident, through February 21, 2001; however, McSorley did not sign a new contract before the next season, and never played in the NHL again.)
Gordie Dwyer	Tampa Bay Lightning	23 games	September 2000	Left the penalty box to try and engage in a fight and verbally and physically abused officials during a preseason game (Dwyer was suspended for remainder of preseason and 21 regular season games; he was also fined $10,000.)
Jan-Axel Alavaara	MoDo Hockey (SHL)	22 games	1998	Intentionally skated into an official
Dale Hunter	Washington Capitals	21 games	April 1993	Deliberately hit and injured Pierre Turgeon after Turgeon had scored (incident occurred in Capitals' final playoff game; suspension carried over to first 21 games of next regular season)
Raffi Torres	Phoenix Coyotes	21 games	April 2012	Illegal check of Marián Hossa in the head (originally 25 games, reduced to 21 games on appeal)
Evander Kane	San Jose Sharks	21 games	October 2021	Violated The NHL's COVID-19 Protocols
Matt Nickerson	Milton Keynes Lightning (EIHL)	20 games	January 2018	Abusing an official and striking a fan
Tom Lysiak	Chicago Black Hawks	20 games	October 1983	Automatic suspension for intentionally tripping linesman Ron Foyt with his stick
Brad May	Phoenix Coyotes	20 games	November 2000	Slashed Steve Heinze in the nose
Steve Downie	Philadelphia Flyers	20 games	September 2007	Threw himself at Dean McAmmond behind the net
Dennis Wideman	Calgary Flames	20 games	January 2016	Cross-checked linesman Don Henderson from behind (reduced to 10 games on appeal in March 2016)
Tom Kühnhackl	Niagara IceDogs (OHL)	20 games	November 2011	Charging and elbowing Ryan Murphy
Patrice Cormier	Rouyn-Noranda Huskies (QMJHL)	20 games	January 2010	Elbowing Mikael Tam
Didrik Nøkleby Svendsen	Sparta Warriors (GET-ligaen)	20 games	November 2017	Forcefully and repeatedly punching a defenseless opponent in the head during a post-game brawl.
Tom Wilson	Washington Capitals	20 games	October 2018	Illegal check to the head on Oskar Sundqvist during a preseason game (reduced to 14 games on appeal in November 2018)
Sergei Belokon	Vityaz Chekhov (KHL)	18 games	December 2010	Deliberately hit and injured Roman Červenka and Martin Škoula
Semir Ben-Amor	Jokerit (then SM-liiga)	18 games	September 2012	Assaulted Ville Peltonen by illegally checking him and beating him while he was down; the team was also fined €40,000.
Matt Cooke	Pittsburgh Penguins	17 games	March 2011	Elbowed Ryan McDonagh in the head. Cooke was suspended for remainder of regular season and round one of 2011 playoffs.
Tomas Javeblad	Luleå HF (SHL)	17 games	1990	Attacked a referee over a goal that Javeblad disagreed with
Eddie Shore	Boston Bruins	16 games	December 1933	Sucker punched Ace Bailey from behind
Rafael Rotter	Vienna Capitals (EBHL)	16 games	December 2010	Attacked the referee after a high stick infraction was not called.
Maurice Richard	Montreal Canadiens	15 games	March 1955	Knocked out linesman Cliff Thompson during a fight with Hal Laycoe; this incident led to the Richard Riot. Richard was suspended for the rest of the 1954–55 season including playoffs.
Wilf Paiement	Colorado Rockies	15 games	October 1978	Caused deliberate facial injuries to Dennis Polonich
Dave Brown	Philadelphia Flyers	15 games	November 1987	Cross-checked and injured Tomas Sandström. Brown was suspended for 13 regular season games and 2 games against the New York Rangers.
Tony Granato	Los Angeles Kings	15 games	February 1994	Slashed Neil Wilkinson in the head.
Shawn Thornton	Boston Bruins	15 games	December 2013	Punched Brooks Orpik in the head while he was on his back on the ice.
Steffen Thoresen	Vålerenga Ishockey (GET-ligaen)	15 games	March 2011	Knocking Lørenskog player Eerikki Koivu down to the ice, then repeatedly punching his head as he was down.
Josh Gratton	Vityaz Chekhov (KHL)	15 games	December 2010	Participating in a mass brawl.
Ivan Larin	Vityaz Chekhov (KHL)	14 games	December 2010	Deliberately hit and injured Roman Červenka and Martin Škoula
Sebastian Karlsson	Linköpings HC (SHL)	14 games	November 2011	Illegal check to the head on Magnus Kahnberg that caused a concussion requiring hospitalization. Karlsson was suspended for 11 SHL games plus 3 national team games.
Tom Wilson	Washington Capitals	14 games	September 2018	Illegal check to the head on Oskar Sundqvist during a preseason game (reduced to 14 games on appeal in November 2018).
Wayne Maki	St. Louis Blues	30 days	September 1969	Mentioned above
Ted Green	Boston Bruins	13 games	September 1969	Mentioned above
André Roy	Tampa Bay Lightning	13 games	April 2002	Left the penalty box and physically abused a linesman while trying to start a fight with players in the New York Rangers penalty box.
Matti Lamberg	Ässät (Liiga)	13 games	September 2017	Charged Valtteri Hietanen with a check to the head
David Shaw	New York Rangers	12 games	October 1988	Slashed Mario Lemieux in the throat
Ron Hextall	Philadelphia Flyers	12 games	May 1989	Attacked Chris Chelios
Matt Johnson	Los Angeles Kings	12 games	November 1998	Sucker punched Jeff Beukeboom in the back of the head
Brantt Myhres	San Jose Sharks	12 games	February 1999	Left the bench to attack Mattias Norström
Darcy Verot	Vityaz Chekhov (KHL)	12 games	December 2010	Deliberately hit and injured Roman Červenka and Martin Škoula
Owen Nolan	San Jose Sharks	11 games	February 2001	Hit Grant Marshall in the face with his stick
Tie Domi	Toronto Maple Leafs	11 games	May 2001	Elbowed Scott Niedermayer in the face. Domi was suspended for the remainder of the 2001 playoffs (3 playoff games plus 8 regular season games).
Jimmy Mann	Winnipeg Jets	10 games	October 1980	Mentioned above
Peter Lindmark	Malmö IF (SHL)	10 games	1996	Swung his stick at the referee's head
Ruslan Salei	Mighty Ducks of Anaheim	10 games	October 1999	Checked Mike Modano face-first into the boards from behind
Scott Niedermayer	New Jersey Devils	10 games	March 2000	Slashed Peter Worrell in the head
Kip Brennan	Los Angeles Kings	10 games	December 2003	Automatic suspension for returning to the ice to engage in a brawl after being ejected for roughing an opponent.
Eric Godard	Pittsburgh Penguins	10 games	February 2011	Automatic suspension for leaving the bench to fight Micheal Haley after Haley had challenged Pittsburgh goalie, Brent Johnson during the Penguins-Islanders brawl.
Trevor Gillies	New York Islanders	10 games	March 2011	Dangerous hit on Cal Clutterbuck in first game back from a nine-game suspension as a result of the Penguins–Islanders brawl.
David Clarkson	Toronto Maple Leafs	10 games	September 2013	Automatic suspension for leaving the bench to engage in a fight
Paul Bissonnette	Phoenix Coyotes	10 games	September 2013	Automatic suspension for leaving the bench to fight a Los Angeles Kings player on an illegal ice change
Patrick Kaleta	Buffalo Sabres	10 games	October 2013	Delivered illegal check to the head of Jack Johnson
Antoine Vermette	Anaheim Ducks	10 games	February 2017	Automatic suspension for slashing linesman Shandor Alphonso
Luke Witkowski	Detroit Red Wings	10 games	November 2017	Automatic suspension for returning to the ice to engage in an altercation with Matthew Tkachuk after being ejected by the officials
Radko Gudas	Philadelphia Flyers	10 games	November 2017	Slashed Mathieu Perreault in the neck
Ryan Hartman	Minnesota Wild	10 games	February 2025	Roughed Tim Stützle by intentionally his driving head into the ice surface while contesting a face-off.

== See also ==
- Battle of the Hockey Enforcers
- Fighting in ice hockey
