= January 1905 =

Month of 1905

<<	January 1905					>>
Su	Mo	Tu	We	Th	Fr	Sa
1	2	3	4	5	6	7
8	9	10	11	12	13	14
15	16	17	18	19	20	21
22	23	24	25	26	27	28
29	30	31

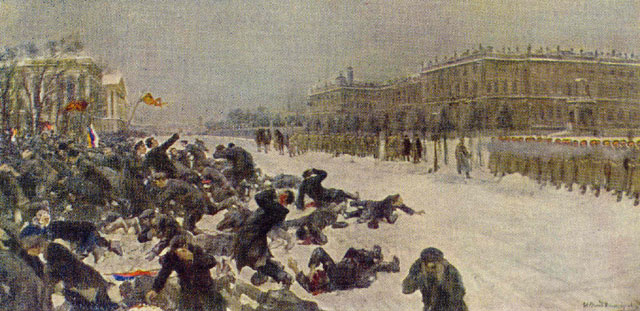
January 22, 1905: Over 140 Russian protesters killed by police outside the Winter Palace in Saint Petersburg (painting by Ivan Vladimirov)

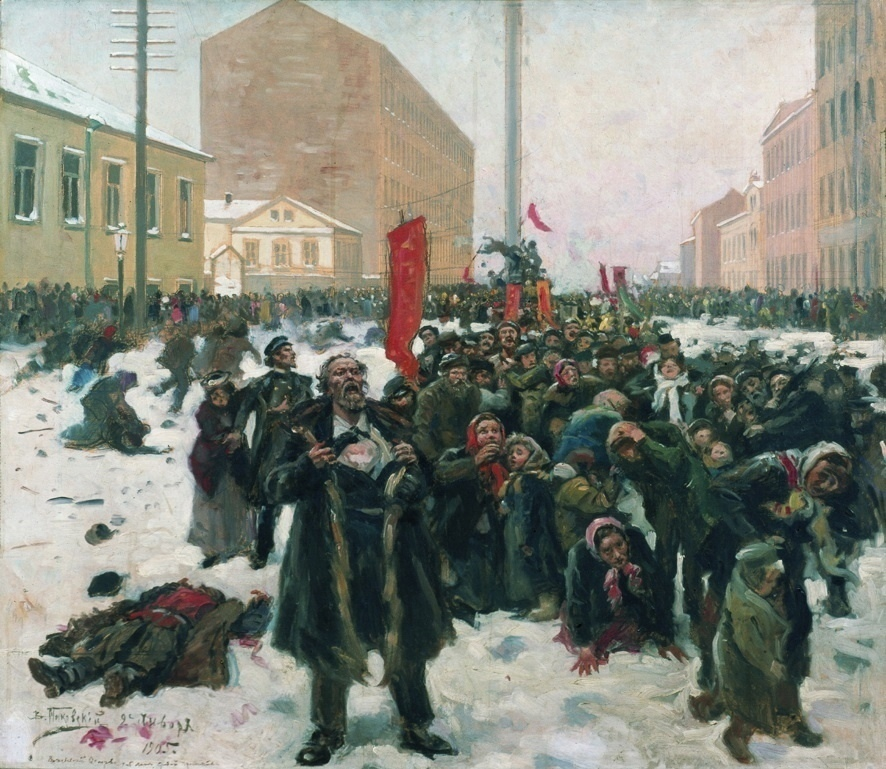
A contemporary painting in 1905 by Vladimir Makovsky

The following events occurred in January 1905:

== January 1, 1905 (Sunday) ==
- In a major defeat in the Russo-Japanese War, General Anatoly Stessel of the Russian Army surrendered Port Arthur, located in mainland China, to the Japanese.
- Born: Malek Bennabi, Algerian philosopher; in Constantine, French Algeria (d. 1973)

== January 2, 1905 (Monday) ==
- As terms of surrender were drawn up for Russia, the Russian squadron of five battleships and three cruisers put into anchor at Sainte-Marie Island (now Nosy Boraha) off the coast of Africa and Madagascar.
- Born:
  - Michael Tippett, English composer; in Wetherden, Suffolk (d. 1998)
  - Anna May Wong (stage name for Wong Liu Tsong), American actress and the first Chinese-American film star in the U.S.; in Los Angeles (d. 1961)
- Died: Clara Augusta Jones Trask, 65, American dime novelist who wrote hundreds of books under the pen names "Hero Strong" and "Clara Augusta"

== January 3, 1905 (Tuesday) ==
- Japan took former possession of Port Arthur and renamed it Ryojun, holding it for 40 years. The area would revert in 1945 to China and is now the Lushunkou District.
- Born: Nobuhito, Prince Takamatsu, Japanese philanthropist, younger brother of Emperor Hirohito; in at the Aoyama Palace in Tokyo (d. 1987)

== January 4, 1905 (Wednesday) ==
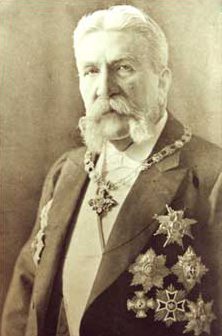
Cantacuzino

- Gheorghe Grigore Cantacuzino became Prime Minister of Romania for the second time, having previously served from 1899 to 1900, and remains in office for more than two years.
- The city of Bend, Oregon, plotted out in 1900 by Alexander Drake, was incorporated as a town for local logging companies, and would have a population of 536 in 1910. By the year 2020, it would have almost 100,000 residents.

== January 5, 1905 (Thursday) ==
- Baroness Emma Orczy's play The Scarlet Pimpernel, the forerunner of her novel, opened at the New Theatre in London, beginning a run of 122 performances and numerous revivals.

== January 6, 1905 (Friday) ==
- The Lick Observatory announced the discovery of a sixth moon of Jupiter, made by their astronomer Charles D. Perrine. Unlike the first five Jovian satellites discovered, the sixth one would be referred to as "Jupiter VI" until 1975, and is now called Himalia.
- The U.S. Senate confirmed the nomination of William D. Crum, an African-American, to the office of collector of customs at Charleston, South Carolina after Crum's nomination by President Theodore Roosevelt.
- Danish prime minister Johan Henrik Deuntzer and his cabinet resigned over a disagreement regarding Denmark's military.
- Died: José María Gabriel y Galán, 34, Spanish poet, died of pneumonia

== January 7, 1905 (Saturday) ==
- The Colorado State Legislature entered an agreement with Alva Adams to allow him to take office as Governor of Colorado while a challenge by Republican candidate James Peabody was being investigated. Under the arrangement, Adams took office on January 10 on condition that he was to step down voluntarily if the legislature concluded that Peabody had won the popular vote. Adams resigned on March 17 after the investigation concluded that Peabody had won.

== January 8, 1905 (Sunday) ==
- At the excavation site in Egypt near Saqqara, where British archaeologist Howard Carter was an inspector for the Egyptian Antiquities Service, the Egyptian guards of the site were in a fist fight with 15 tourists from France, many of whom were intoxicated. The government of France filed a formal protest with Egyptian authorities, and Carter took the side of his workers. To appease the French in the "Saqqara Affair", Carter was fired from his job and without formal employment for the next three years. In 1923, he would gain worldwide fame in finding the tomb of Tutankhamen.

== January 9, 1905 (Monday) ==
- U.S. Secretary of the Navy Paul Morton and Admiral of the Navy George Dewey reviewed the largest concentration of American warships up to that time, as 40 ships, "including six of the most powerful battleships afloat", were brought into port at Hampton Roads, Virginia.
- Died: Louise Michel, 74, French anarchist known as "the French grand dame of anarchy"

== January 10, 1905 (Tuesday) ==
- Chile and Bolivia signed a treaty of peace and amity.

== January 11, 1905 (Wednesday) ==
- Under the supervision of five editors, work began on the comprehensive Catholic Encyclopedia, subtitled "An International Work of Reference on the Constitution, Doctrine, Discipline, and History of the Catholic Church" and published by the Robert Appleton Company. The first volume would appear in 1907.
- Died: Yehudah Aryeh Leib Alter, 57, Polish Talmudic scholar Hasidic rabbi

== January 12, 1905 (Thursday) ==
- Marie Walcker, the last victim of German-born American serial killer and bigamist Johann Otto Hoch, died of poisoning in Chicago a month after her their marriage. On January 30, Hoch was arrested in New York City, initially for having married and deserted multiple women (one estimate is 45 women in ten states from 1888 to 1905), but soon was charged with Marie Walcker's murder, for which he would be convicted. Hoch was suspected of perhaps as many as 50 murders, but only charged with Walcker's death. He would be hanged on February 23, 1906.
- Born: Tex Ritter (stage name for Woodward Maurice Ritter), American actor and singer; in Murvaul, Texas (d. 1974)

== January 13, 1905 (Friday) ==
- Alexander, Prince of Lippe, the last sovereign monarch of the German principality of Lippe, died after a nominal reign of 10 years, leaving no children to succeed him and ending the Lippe-Detmold line. Prince Alexander's power had been exercised by regents because of his mental illness, and the question of a successor would not be resolved until October until the last regent, Alexander's cousin Leopold IV, Count of Lippe-Biesterfeld. After World War One, the principality would be abolished and would exist as a "Free State" until the end of World War Two; it is now part of the German state of North Rhine-Westphalia.
- Born: Kay Francis, American stage and film actress and Warner Brothers leading lady; in Oklahoma City, Oklahoma Territory (d. 1968)

== January 14, 1905 (Saturday) ==
- Jens Christian Christensen took office as the new Prime Minister of Denmark.
- Born:
  - Takeo Fukuda, Prime Minister of Japan from 1976 to 1978; in Gunma, Gunma Prefecture (d. 1995)
  - Sterling Holloway, American character actor and voice actor known for providing the distinct sound of Winnie the Pooh for Disney films; in Cedartown, Georgia (d. 1992)
- Died: Ernst Abbe, 64, German optical instruments developer who created the Abbe refractometer and the "Abbe number measure of wave dispersion

== January 15, 1905 (Sunday) ==
- A series of three 133 feet (41 m) high tsunamis killed 61 people in the Norway in the villages of Ytre Nesdal and Bødal, after a rockslide swept down Mount Ramnefjell and crashed into Lake Lovatnet.
- Born: Torin Thatcher, English stage and film actor known for his portrayal of villains; in Bombay, British India (now Mumbai) (d. 1981)

== January 16, 1905 (Monday) ==
- The Ottawa Hockey Club retained the Stanley Cup, winning the best-2-of-3 series in the second and deciding game against the Dawson City Nuggets, who had traveled 4,000 miles (6,400 km) from Canada's Yukon Territory by dog sled, ship, and train over more than three weeks to challenge Ottawa for the Cup. After prevailing in the first game, 9 to 2 over the Nuggets on January 13, the day after the exhausted Nugget players arrived in the capital, the champions easily won Game 2, with a final score of Ottawa Hockey Club 23, Dawson City Nuggets 2.

== January 17, 1905 (Tuesday) ==
- In France, Prime Minister Émile Combes and his cabinet announced their resignations after being implicated in the Affair of the Cards (L'Affaire des Fiches), a system set up by the War Ministry to purge the French Army officers corps of Jesuits.
- Born:
  - D. R. Kaprekar, Indian recreational mathematician; in Dahanu, Bombay province, British India (d. 1986) "Kaprekar numbers", where the square of the number can be divided into two parts that add up to the original number (such as 45 or 99) are named in his honor.
  - Guillermo Stábile, Argentine soccer football ? centre forward who was the top scorer in the 1930 World Cup while playing for the Argentina national team; later the manager for the Argentina team from 1939 to 1960; in Buenos Aires (d. 1966)
  - Saeb Salam, Prime Minister of Lebanon in 1952, 1953, 1960-1961 and 1970-1973; in Beirut, Ottoman Empire (d. 2000)

== January 18, 1905 (Wednesday) ==
- U.S. District Judge Charles Swayne of Florida was impeached by the U.S. House of Representatives.
- Born: Joseph Bonanno, Italian-born American gangster nicknamed "Joe Bananas", and crime boss for the Bonanno crime family from 1931 to 1968; as Giuseppe Carlo Bonnano in Castellammare del Golfo, Sicily (d. 2002)
- Nahoko Takada, Japanese educator, trade unionist, politician, socialist and peace activist in Fukushima, Empire of Japan (d. 1991)

== January 19, 1905 (Thursday) ==
- Tsar Nicholas II of the Russian Empire narrowly escaped injury during the "blessing of the waters" of the Neva River near Saint Petersburg. One of the guns firing a salute malfunctioned and sent grapeshot down into the crowd of dignitaries, narrowly missing the Tsar.
- Died: Debendranath Tagore, 87, Indian philosopher who led the Brahmoism religious movement (in 1848) (b. 1817)

== January 20, 1905 (Friday) ==
- An arbitration treaty was signed at Washington between the United States, Sweden, and Norway.
- Lobbyists from the U.S. territory of New Mexico presented their arguments against being consolidated with the Arizona Territory for admission as a single state.
- Died: Gyula Szapáry, 72, Prime Minister of the Kingdom of Hungary 1890 to 1892

== January 21, 1905 (Saturday) ==
- The Dominican Republic signed an agreement with the United States to allow the U.S. to administer the collection of customs taxes for Santo Domingo for 50 years, with the U.S. to assume responsibility for payment of the Republic's debts to foreign nations from Dominican income. The agreement was done as an exercise of the "Roosevelt Corollary" to the Monroe Doctrine.
- Born: Christian Dior, French fashion designer and founder of the Christian Dior SE line; in Granville, Manche département (died of heart attack, 1957)

== January 22, 1905 (Sunday) ==
- The Bloody Sunday massacre of peaceful Russian demonstrators at the Winter Palace in Saint Petersburg took place, leading to an unsuccessful uprising. (On the Old Style calendar used at the time in Russia, the date was January 9).
- Died:
  - General Ștefan Fălcoianu, 69, Chief of the Romanian General Staff 1886 to 1894 and Romania's Minister of War 1884 to 1886
  - Clara Harrison Stranahan, 73, American philanthropist and the founder of Barnard College, the women's counterpart to Columbia University

== January 23, 1905 (Monday) ==
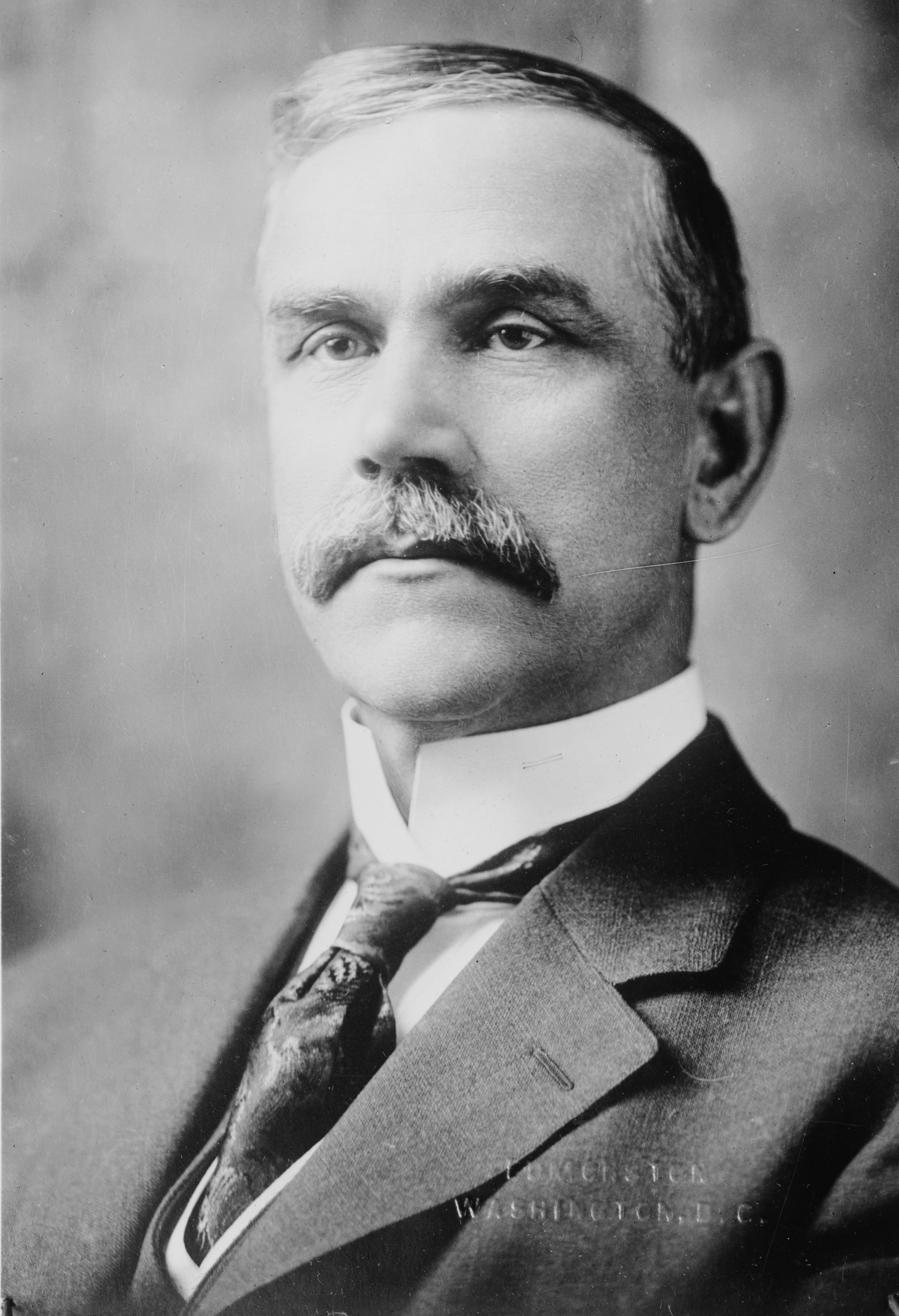
Senator Smoot

- U.S. Senator Reed Smoot of Utah, who also served at the time as one of the Quorum of the Twelve in the governing body of the Church of Jesus Christ of Latter-day Saints, refused to testify before a Senate committee about the secret endowment ceremony of church members.

== January 24, 1905 (Tuesday) ==
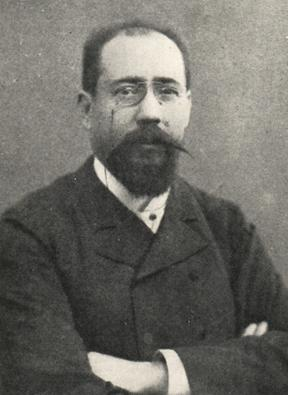
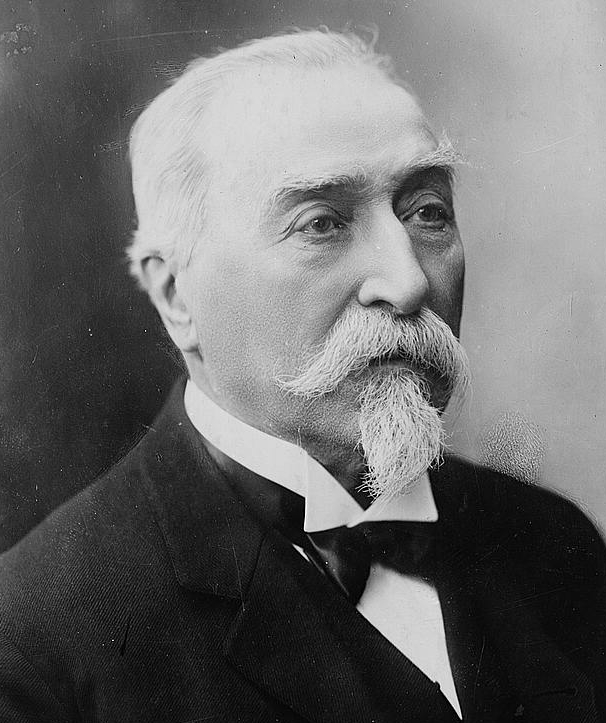
Maurice Rouvier and Émile Combes
- Maurice Rouvier formed a government as the new Prime Minister of France, succeeding Émile Combes.
- Born: J. Howard Marshall, American oil billionaire; in Philadelphia (d. 1995)

== January 25, 1905 (Wednesday) ==
- Tsar Nicholas II appointed General Dmitri Trepov to be the Governor-General of Saint Petersburg, with absolute power to issue regulations to keep order.

== January 26, 1905 (Thursday) ==
- The Cullinan Diamond, at 1.37 pounds (0.62 kg) the largest diamond in ever discovered, was unearthed at the Premier No. 2 mine in Cullinan in the Transvaal Province.
- The Imperial Russian Army opened fire on demonstrators in Riga, Governorate of Livonia, killing 73 people and injuring 200 in the Russian Revolution of 1905
- Elections were held in Hungary for the 413 seats in the Országgyűlés, the Kingdom's parliament within Austria-Hungary. Voters overwhelmingly rejected the Liberal Party, led by Prime Minister István Tisza, that had ruled Hungary since 1875, and the Liberals lost 118 of their 277 seats, but Emperor Franz Joseph I of Austria-Hungary (in his capacity as King Ferenc József) ignored the results and kept Tisza in power.
- Born:
  - Charles Lane, American character actor for 72 years on film and television; in San Francisco (d. 2007)
  - Maria von Trapp, Austrian-born singer and leader of the Trapp Family Singers, whose life was dramatized in The Sound of Music; as Maria Augusta Kutschera, in Vienna, Austria-Hungary (d. 1987)

== January 27, 1905 (Friday) ==
- The Nelson Act was passed into law in the United States, providing for racial segregation of schools in the Alaska Territory. While providing for establishment of a school district in any unincorporated community with a population of at least 20 "white children and children of mixed blood who lead a civilized life", the Act also required that "the education of Eskimos and Indians in Alaska shall remain under the direction and control of the Secretary of the Interior, and school for and among the Eskimos and Indians of Alaska shall have the same right to be admitted to any Indian boarding school as the Indian children in the States or Territories of the United States."
- Died: Watson Heston, 58, American editorial cartoonist and author of The Bible Comically Illustrated

== January 28, 1905 (Saturday) ==
- Two disasters in the Russo-Japanese War took place in different battles. In Manchuria, near Linchinpu, a group of 200 Japanese soldiers armed only with rifles was thrown into battle against Russian Army defenders who had two machine guns available. When the Japanese got within 900 feet (270 m) of the Russians, the firing of 1,000 cartridges began with most of the soldiers killed or wounded within two minutes. At the village of Sandepu, 36 miles (58 km) south of Mukden, General Oskar Gripenberg ordered the Russian Army to attack, but the Japanese repelled the attackers with a bayonet charge. Most of the Russian soldiers were killed or wounded, and those who didn't die immediately were left behind in the retreat and froze to death overnight.

== January 29, 1905 (Sunday) ==
- Rioting broke out in Warsaw, at the time under Russian Imperial rule with a Russian Governor-General.
- Born: Barnett Newman, American abstract expressionist painter; in New York City (d. 1970)

== January 30, 1905 (Monday) ==
- The U.S. Supreme Court rendered its unanimous decision in the landmark case of Swift & Co. v. United States, upholding as constitutional the right of the federal government to use antitrust laws to regulate monopolies based on the Commerce Clause of Article I, Section 8, of the U.S. Constitution ("Congress... shall have power to regulate Commerce... among the several States")

== January 31, 1905 (Tuesday) ==
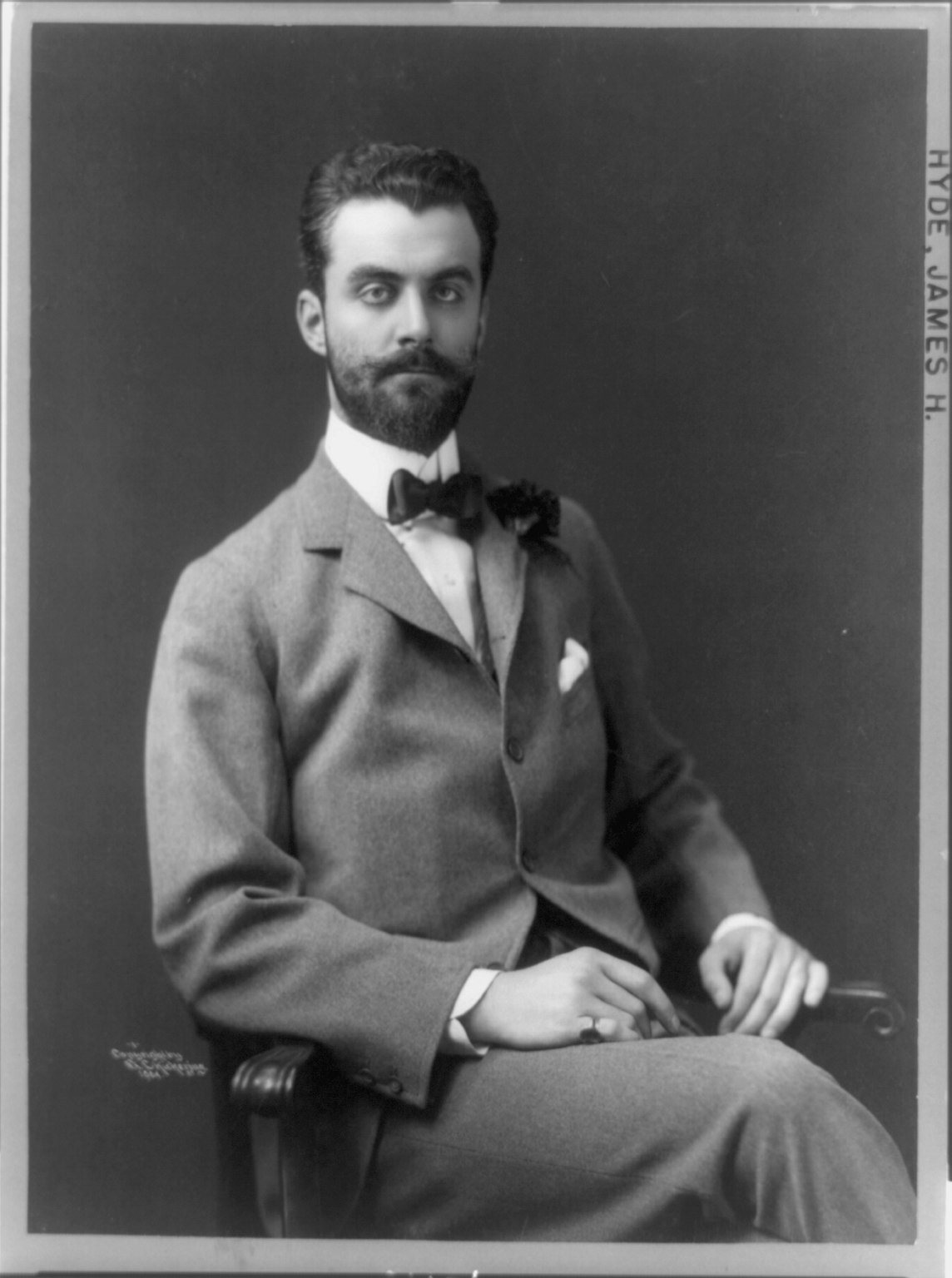
J. Hazen Hyde

- What has been called "the greatest ball of the Gilded Age" was held by James Hazen Hyde, the 28-year-old heir to the fortune of the founder of the Equitable Life Assurance Association" at New York City's Sherry Hotel, who spent $200,000 for a "Louis XV costume ball" for invited guests. Based on purchasing power at the time, the cost of the party would have been equivalent to more than 6.7 million dollars in 2022.
- Born: John O'Hara, American novelist and short-story writer; in Pottsville, Pennsylvania (d. 1970)
- Died: Konstantin Savitsky, 60, Russian painter
