= Allan Loney =

Canadian ice hockey player

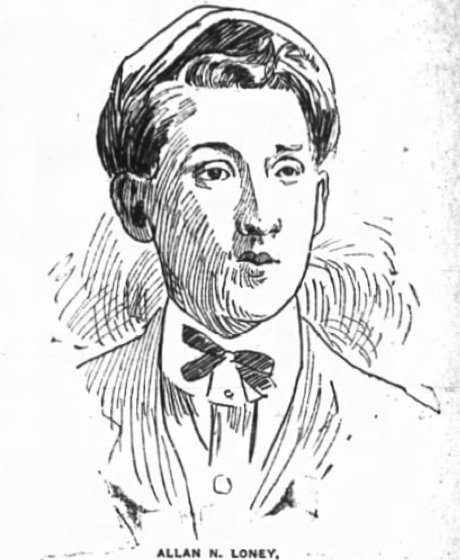
- Born: May 3, 1885; Parry Sound, Ontario, Canada
- Died: March 2, 1965 (aged 79); Edmonton, Alberta, Canada
- Position: Cover point
- Played for: Maxville Hockey Club

Allan Nelson Loney (May 3, 1885 – March 2, 1965) was a Canadian ice hockey player from the Ontario town of Maxville. He was the only son of Ephram Allen Loney and Jerusha Ann Adams of Maxville.

Loney was the first hockey player to be charged with murder for the death of another player, after he clubbed Alcide Laurin to death during a game on February 24, 1905. Loney claimed self-defence. The charges were reduced to manslaughter, and he was subsequently acquitted. He died on March 2, 1965, in Edmonton, Alberta, where he had worked as a Canadian National Railway employee.

== See also ==
- Violence in ice hockey
