= Unity Building (Chicago) =

Office building in Chicago, Illinois (1892-1989)

Coordinates: 41°53′2″N 87°37′45″W

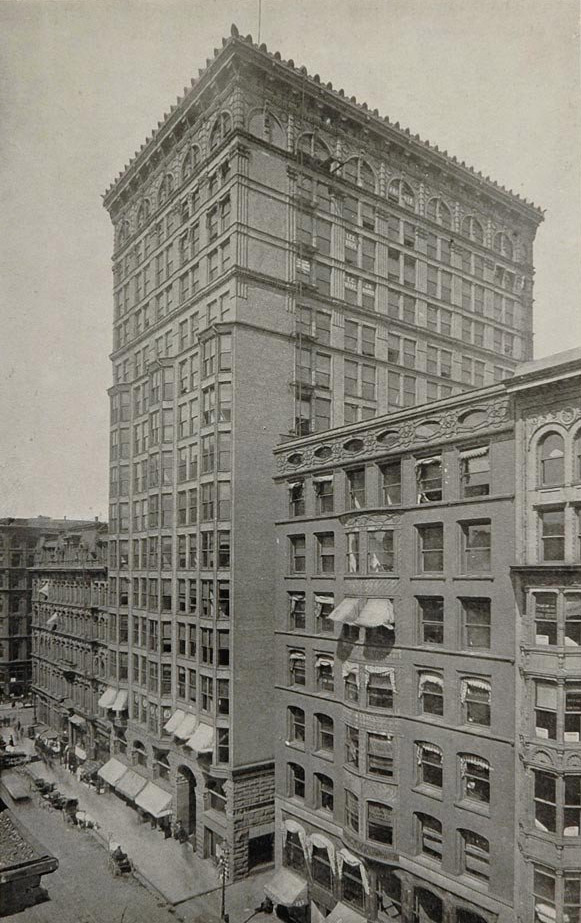
Unity Building, 1902

The Unity Building in Chicago, Illinois, at 127 North Dearborn Street in the Chicago Loop, was a 17-story building that was once the tallest skyscraper in Chicago. Gustave Loehr had an office in this building, and it was in his office that the Rotary Club of Chicago held its first club meeting, on February 23, 1905.

The Unity Building was built between 1890 and 1892 by John Peter Altgeld, who became the 20th Governor of Illinois. It was listed on the National Register of Historic Places for its historical significance. It was demolished in 1989, and the NRHP designation was later rescinded.

== See also ==
- National Register of Historic Places listings in Central Chicago: Former listings
