= Gustave Loehr =

Rotary International leader (1864–1918)

Gustave Loehr (1864–1918) was one of the four founders of Rotary International, one of the premier service organizations of the world. He was also the host of the first-ever Rotary meeting in Chicago in 1905.

Born in Carlinville, Illinois, Loehr moved to Chicago in 1886 and briefly attended Lake Forest College before embarking on a career as a mining engineer. His office was located in Room 711 of the Unity Building on North Dearborn Street in the Chicago Loop, where he made many acquaintances, including Paul P. Harris, an attorney. He also became a member of a Masonic lodge.

On the evening of February 23, 1905, Harris and another friend, coal dealer Sylvester Schiele, met Loehr and merchant tailor Hiram Shorey in Loehr's office. There, Harris presented an idea—the formation of a businessman's club for social purposes. The other three men shared Harris' enthusiasm for the idea, and agreed to meet again two weeks later, when they would bring other friends.

The February 23 gathering is credited by Rotary historians as the first-ever Rotary Club meeting, and Loehr, like the others, holds a valued place in Rotary history.

Prior to the Unity Building's demolition in 1989, Rotarians painstakingly removed all fixtures from Loehr's old office and placed them in storage. The office was later reconstructed on the sixteenth floor of Rotary International headquarters in Evanston, Illinois, where it remains a memorial to the legacy of the first Rotary meeting.

Loehr died of Bright's Disease on May 23, 1918 in Chicago and is buried in Carlinville City Cemetery. On July 21, 2004, members of the Carlinville Rotary Club dedicated a new graveside memorial at Loehr's burial site to honor his contributions as an original founder of Rotary International.
