= Alcide Laurin =

Canadian ice hockey player (1880–1905)

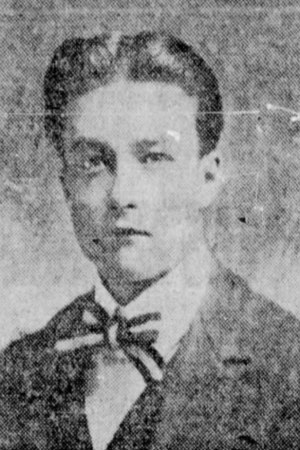
- Laurin pictured in the Montreal Daily Star on March 1, 1905
- Born: November 21, 1880 Sainte-Marthe, Quebec, Canada
- Died: February 24, 1905 (aged 24) Maxville, Ontario, Canada
- Played for: Alexandria Crescents
- Playing career: unknown–1905

Joseph Onésime Maxime "Alcide" Laurin (November 21, 1880 – February 24, 1905) was a Canadian ice hockey player who played for an Ontario-based team in Alexandria, and is the second recorded player, after Archie Hooper, to die as a result of an on-ice incident in ice hockey.

== Biography ==
On February 24, 1905, Laurin was beaten to death by 19-year-old Allan Loney, a player on a rival team from Maxville, Ontario. Laurin took a shot in the chin, followed by a blow to the left temple from Loney's stick. Soon after the incident, Laurin, 24 at the time, was pronounced dead on the ice. Loney, a player who was infamous for his brutal on-ice violence, was charged with murder, which was later changed to manslaughter.

On March 29, after five hours of deliberation, the jury acquitted Loney after defense witnesses testified and claimed the blow to Laurin was either instinctive or was in self-defense. All charges were dropped and the case was dismissed.

The Maxville-Alexandria rivalry was based around opposing religious beliefs held by both sides. The Alexandria side of the rivalry was made up of Catholic French Canadians, contrary to the anglophone and Protestant beliefs of the Maxville population.
